= Camping Unlimited: Camp Krem =

Camp for the Developmentally Disabled in California, US

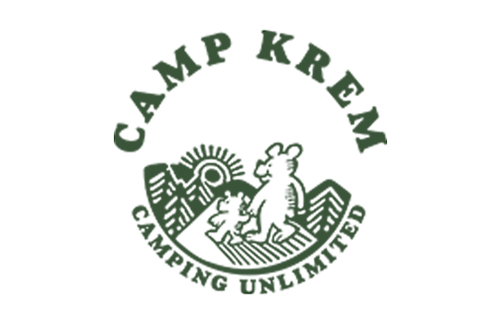
- Founded: May 1, 1957; 68 years ago Boulder Creek, California, US
- Type: 501(c)(3), charitable organization
- Location: Ahwahnee, California, US
- Coordinates: 37.3688°N 119.7196°E
- Region served: California
- Website: https://campingunlimited.org

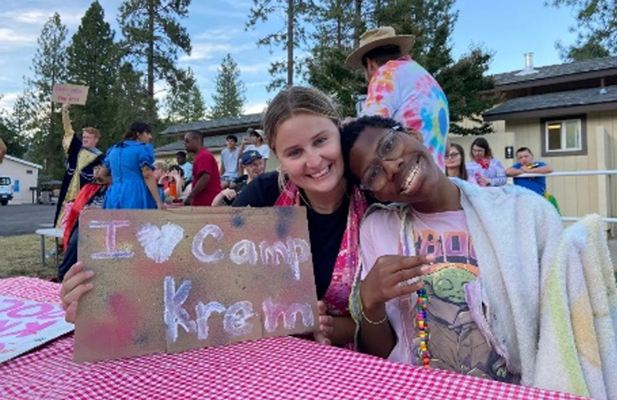
I love Camp Krem

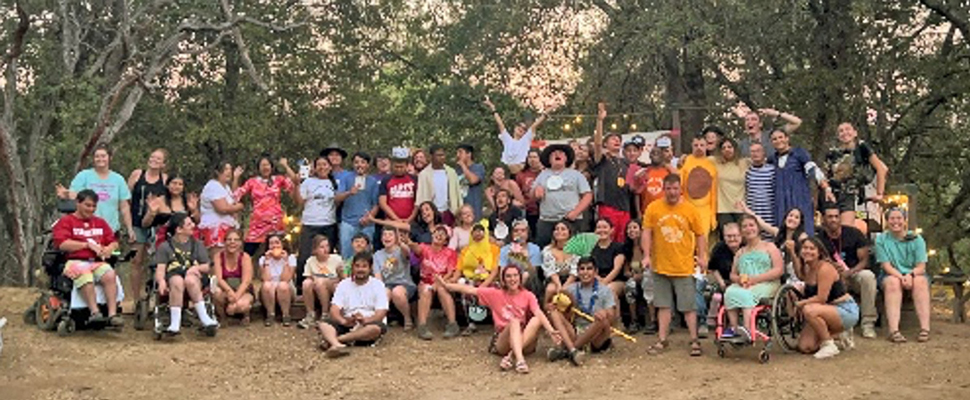
Summer Camp

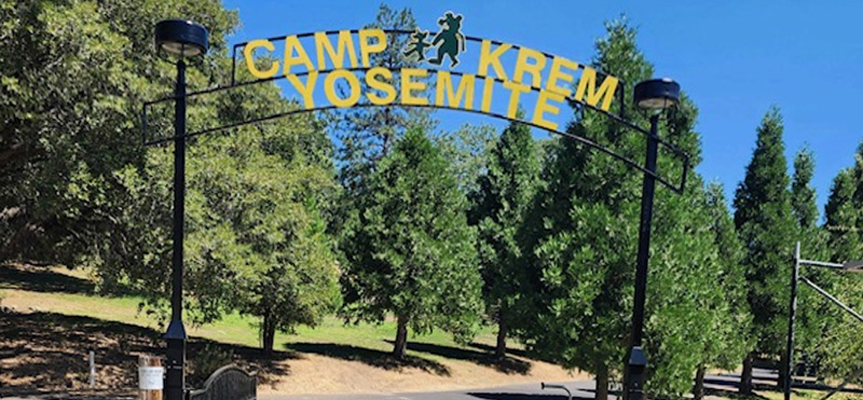
Camp Krem in Yosemite

Camping Unlimited for the Developmentally Disabled is a non-profit public benefit corporation that operates Camp Krem, a camp serving children, teens, and adults with developmental and physical disabilities. Founded in 1957 and incorporated in 1961, the organization offers year-round recreational and respite programs and maintains a 501(c)(3) federal tax exemption.

Since its founding, the organization has hosted an estimated 200,000 days and nights of independence-building recreation, serving thousands of individuals with special needs while providing vital respite for their families and caregivers. It is accredited by the American Camp Association and maintains a Platinum rating from GuideStar for transparency.

== Background and History ==
Camping Unlimited was founded in 1957 by Alexander Angel Krem, a Bulgarian-born educator who immigrated to the United States in 1928 to study recreation at George Williams College in Chicago. Inspired by his belief that recreation means “re-creation,” he became a special education teacher in San Leandro, California, where he advocated for the mainstreaming of students with developmental disabilities. Discovering that many of his students had never been camping, Krem began taking them on overnight trips — initially in his backyard on Ordway Street in Berkeley, California.

In 1961, the organization was formally incorporated, and by 1965 it had acquired 45 acres of redwood forest land in Boulder Creek, California, in the Santa Cruz Mountains. Volunteers, including parents, teachers, and local service organizations, helped build the camp’s early facilities. Over time, Camp Krem developed into a flagship program offering year-round recreational opportunities and summer camps focused on independence, inclusion, and community.

By 2019, Camp Krem hosted approximately 1,200 campers with special needs for more than 7,000 days and nights of programming.

== Wildfire and Destruction ==
For more than 50 years, Camp Krem’s 97-acre campus in the Santa Cruz Mountains served as Camping Unlimited’s primary site. In August 2020, the CZU Lightning Complex Fire ravaged the property, destroying most of its buildings, including the Jon Lucchese Center (a multipurpose building with kitchen, dining hall, and offices), the arts & crafts center, cabins, the health center, and amphitheater. Spared were the pool and playground area, featuring an 85,000-gallon solar-heated, wheelchair-accessible swimming pool, and parts of the lower camp area.

Despite significant investments of time and money, the rebuilding process remains delayed due to FEMA and Santa Cruz County permitting challenges.

Following the fire, the vacant property was subject to vandalism and theft, including the destruction of vehicles and the theft of equipment, further hindering recovery efforts.

== Rebuilding and Recovery ==
Camping Unlimited acquired another camp facility in 2021 — Camp Krem Yosemite, located off Highway 49 between Oakhurst and Mariposa, California. This new site has hosted four summer sessions, accommodating more than 650 campers annually.

Meanwhile, plans for rebuilding Camp Krem Boulder Creek are under review by Santa Cruz County planning authorities. The organization continues to seek community and governmental support to restore its historic home while maintaining its active programs at the Yosemite location.

Camping Unlimited also runs year-round programs, including day trips to zoos, aquariums, athletic events, and cultural attractions, as well as movie nights, bowling, hiking, and online activities.

== Accreditation and Recognition ==
Camp Krem is accredited by the American Camp Association, holds a Platinum Seal of Transparency from GuideStar, and has long been recognized for its inclusive year-round programs serving individuals with a wide range of developmental disabilities.

== Programs and Activities ==
Camp Krem offers a variety of programs and activities designed to foster independence and social engagement, including:

- Summer Camp
- Travel Camp (throughout California and beyond)
- Outdoor Adventure Camp
- Year-Round Respite Programs
- Day Trips and Virtual Camps
- Arts & Crafts, Drama, Dance, Music, Sports, Hiking, Gardening, and Swimming

== Legacy and Leadership ==
Alexander Krem remained involved with Camping Unlimited until his death in 1988. His family continues to be active in the organization: his son Alex Krem Jr. serves on the board of directors, and his granddaughter Christina Krem is the current Camp Director, overseeing day-to-day operations.

The board of directors comprises individuals with decades-long connections to the program.
