= Nipinnawasee, California =

Nipinnawasee
- Census-designated place
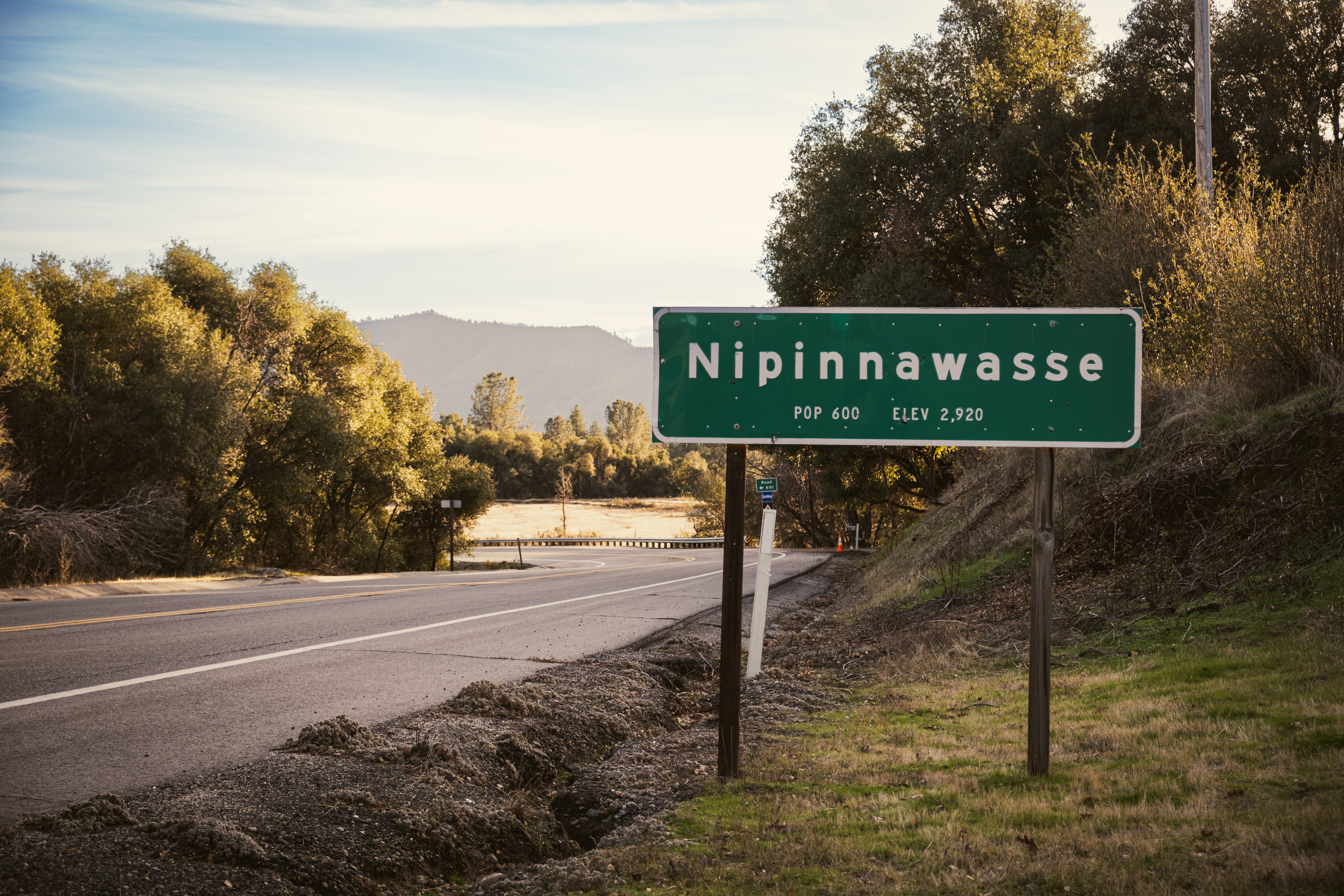

- Location within California Location within the United States
- Coordinates: 37°24′15″N 119°43′59″W
- Country: United States
- State: California
- County: Madera

Area
  - Total: 3.09 sq mi (8.0 km^{2})
  - Land: 3.09 sq mi (8.0 km^{2})
  - Water: 0 sq mi (0 km^{2})
- Elevation: 2,930 ft (893 m)

Population (2020)
  - Total: 434
  - Density: 140/sq mi (54.2/km^{2})
- Time zone: UTC-8 (Pacific (PST))
  - Summer (DST): UTC-7 (PDT)
- ZIP Code: 93601 (Ahwahnee)
- GNIS feature IDs: 1656190; 2628765
- FIPS Code: 06-51470

Nipinnawasee (formerly Nipinnawassee, Nippinnawasee, and Nippinnawassee) is a census-designated place in Madera County, California, United States. It is located 1 mile (1.6 km) southeast of Miami Mountain in the Sierra Nevada, 14 miles (22.5 km) southeast of Mariposa, at an elevation of 2,930 feet (890 m). The population was 434 at the 2020 census.

== History ==
The town was named about 1908 by Edgar B. Landon who brought the name from Michigan, where, according to the Native Americans of his native district, it means "plenty of deer". The name was accepted by the Post Office in 1915.

A post office operated at Nipinnawasee from 1912 to 1961. In July 1961, the Harlow Fire—a 43,000-acre (17,000 ha) wildfire—destroyed much of the town, as well as neighboring Ahwahnee, where two people died. Nipinnawasee "never revived", according to a Madera Tribune report written six years after the fire.

== Geography ==
The community is along the northwestern edge of Madera County, bordered by Ahwahnee to the southeast and Mariposa County to the northwest. California State Route 49 is the main road through the community.

According to the United States Census Bureau, the CDP has a total area of 3.1 square miles (8.0 km^{2}), all land. The community drains to Peterson Creek, a south-flowing tributary of the Fresno River.

== Demographics ==
Historical population
Census	Pop.	Note	%±
2010	475		—
2020	434		−8.6%
U.S. Decennial Census; 1850–1870 1880-1890; 1900 1910 1920; 1930 1940 1950; 1960 1970 1980; 1990 2000 2010 2020

Nipinnawasee first appeared as a census designated place in the 2010 U.S. census.

=== 2020 census ===
Nipinnawasee CDP, California – Racial and ethnic composition Note: the US Census treats Hispanic/Latino as an ethnic category. This table excludes Latinos from the racial categories and assigns them to a separate category. Hispanics/Latinos may be of any race.
Race / Ethnicity (NH = Non-Hispanic)	Pop 2010	Pop 2020	% 2010	% 2020
White alone (NH)	383	358	80.63%	82.49%
Black or African American alone (NH)	0	1	0.00%	0.23%
Native American or Alaska Native alone (NH)	4	4	0.84%	0.92%
Asian alone (NH)	0	1	0.00%	0.23%
Pacific Islander alone (NH)	0	0	0.00%	0.00%
Some Other Race alone (NH)	0	0	0.00%	0.00%
Mixed Race or Multi-Racial (NH)	38	22	8.00%	5.07%
Hispanic or Latino (any race)	50	48	10.53%	11.06%
Total	475	434	100.00%	100.00%

=== 2010 census ===
The 2010 United States census reported that Nipinnawasee had a population of 475. The population density was 155.1 inhabitants per square mile (59.9/km^{2}). The racial makeup of Nipinnawasee was 422 (88.8%) White, 2 (0.4%) African American, 9 (1.9%) Native American, 0 (0.0%) Asian, 0 (0.0%) Pacific Islander, 3 (0.6%) from other races, and 39 (8.2%) from two or more races. Hispanic or Latino of any race were 50 persons (10.5%).

The Census reported that 475 people (100% of the population) lived in households, 0 (0%) lived in non-institutionalized group quarters, and 0 (0%) were institutionalized.

There were 192 households, out of which 47 (24.5%) had children under the age of 18 living in them, 126 (65.6%) were opposite-sex married couples living together, 15 (7.8%) had a female householder with no husband present, 9 (4.7%) had a male householder with no wife present. There were 9 (4.7%) unmarried opposite-sex partnerships, and 0 (0%) same-sex married couples or partnerships. 33 households (17.2%) were made up of individuals, and 11 (5.7%) had someone living alone who was 65 years of age or older. The average household size was 2.47. There were 150 families (78.1% of all households); the average family size was 2.68.

The population was spread out, with 90 people (18.9%) under the age of 18, 35 people (7.4%) aged 18 to 24, 74 people (15.6%) aged 25 to 44, 177 people (37.3%) aged 45 to 64, and 99 people (20.8%) who were 65 years of age or older. The median age was 49.5 years. For every 100 females, there were 93.1 males. For every 100 females age 18 and over, there were 90.6 males.

There were 217 housing units at an average density of 70.9 per square mile (27.4/km^{2}), of which 144 (75.0%) were owner-occupied, and 48 (25.0%) were occupied by renters. The homeowner vacancy rate was 1.4%; the rental vacancy rate was 11.1%. 337 people (70.9% of the population) lived in owner-occupied housing units and 138 people (29.1%) lived in rental housing units.
