= Cole Popovich =

American football player and coach (born 1985)

Houston Texans
- Title: Offensive line coach, Offensive run game coordinator

Personal information
- Born: February 15, 1985 (age 41); Monterey Park, California, U.S.

Career information
- Position: Left guard
- High school: Yosemite (Oakhurst, California)
- College: Fresno State (2004-2007)

Career history
- Los Angeles Valley College (2011) Offensive line coach; Fresno City College (2012–2013) Offensive line coach; Utah State (2013–2014) Graduate assistant; Minot State (2014–2015) Offensive line coach & Co-offensive coordinator; New England Patriots (2016–2020); Coaching assistant (2016–2018); Assistant running backs coach (2019); Co-offensive line coach (2020); Franklin High School (2021) Offensive line coach; Troy (2022) Offensive line coach; Houston Texans (2023–present); Assistant offensive line coach (2023–2024); Offensive line coach/offensive run game coordinator (2025–present)

Awards and highlights
- 2× Super Bowl champion (LI, LIII); Paul Shechter Courage Award (2007); Unanimous All-American (2004)

Cole Popovich (born February 15, 1985) is an American professional football coach who is the offensive line coach and offensive run game coordinator for the Houston Texans of the National Football League (NFL).

== College career ==
Popovich was a four-year starter as left guard on the Fresno State Bulldogs football team from 2004 to 2007. He was also named a unanimous Freshman All-American in 2005.

== Coaching career ==
Popovich coached at the collegiate level for 5 seasons, working in various colleges such as Los Angeles Valley, Fresno City, Utah State, and Minot State before joining the Patriots' staff in 2016. He was part of the Patriots coaching staff that won Super Bowl LI. In the game, the Patriots defeated the Atlanta Falcons by a score of 34–28 in overtime. Popovich won his second Super Bowl title when the Patriots defeated the Los Angeles Rams in Super Bowl LIII. In 2020 it was announced that he and Carmen Bricillo would become co-offensive line coaches after the retirement of Dante Scarnecchia.

On July 23, 2021, despite Bill Belichick desiring to keep Popovich on his offensive staff, it was reported that Popovich would not be coaching for the Patriots in 2021 due to reasons relating to the COVID-19 vaccine. Upon departing from the Patriots, Popovich instead spent the 2021 season as the offensive line coach for Franklin High School in nearby Franklin, MA.

Popovich was hired by Jon Sumrall at Troy in January, 2022 to be the offensive line coach for the Trojans.

On February 23, 2023, Popovich was hired by the Houston Texans to be their assistant offensive line coach. He was promoted as offensive line coach and run game coordinator on February 4, 2025.

== Personal life ==
Popovich is married to his wife Jessica, and they have two sons. He is distantly related to NBA coaching legend Gregg Popovich.
