= Harlow Fire =

1961 wildfire in Central California

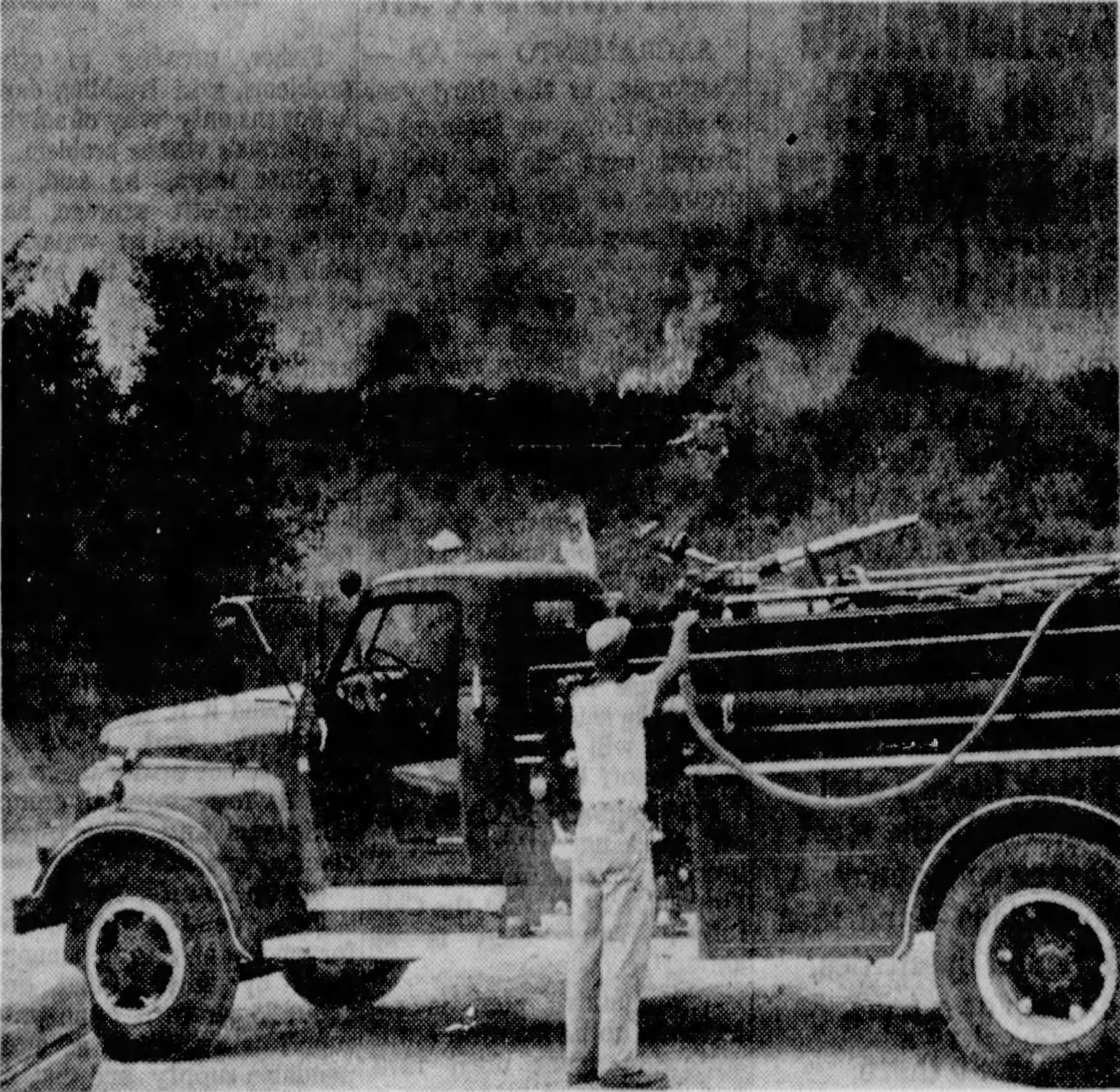
- A tanker truck and a firefighter standing against the Harlow Fire
- Date: July 10 – July 15, 1961; (6 days)
- Location: Mariposa County and; Madera County, California, United States
- Coordinates: 37.366°N 119.726°W

Statistics
- Burned area: 43,329 acres (17,535 ha; 68 sq mi; 175 km^{2})

Impacts
- Deaths: 2
- Injuries: 22
- Structures lost: 106 (20 damaged)
- Cost: $2 million; (equivalent to about $16 million in 2024)

Ignition
- Cause: Arson

Map
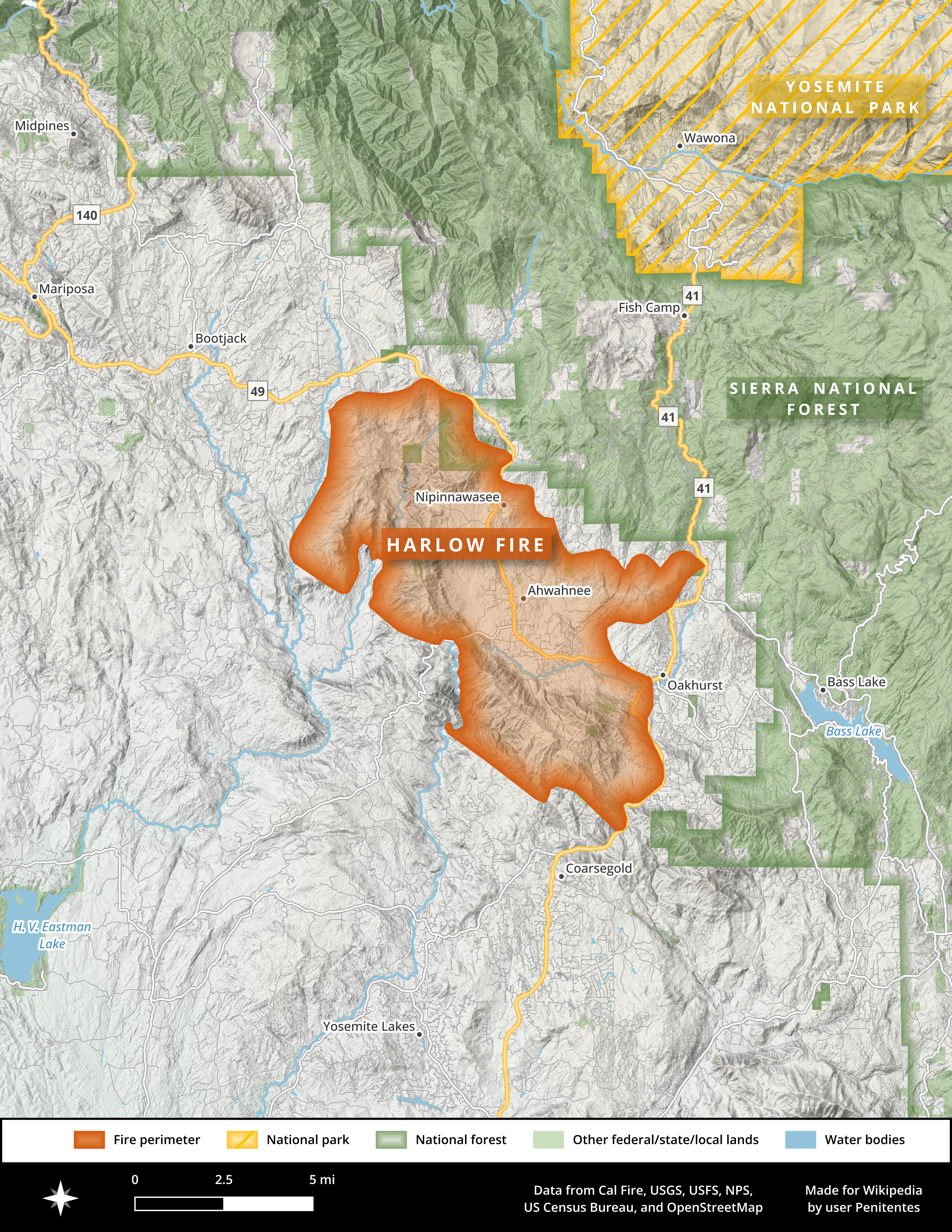
- The extent of the Harlow Fire

- The general location of the fire, in Central California's Mariposa and Madera counties

The Harlow Fire was a large wildfire in Central California's Mariposa and Madera counties in mid-July 1961. The fire ignited on July 10 and burned rapidly, spreading to 43,329 acres (17,535 hectares) before it was fully surrounded by containment lines on July 13 and fully controlled on July 15. During those six days the Harlow Fire destroyed more than one hundred buildings, devastating the rural communities of Ahwahnee and Nipinnawasee in the foothills of the Sierra Nevada to the west of Yosemite National Park and the Sierra National Forest. The latter town never recovered. Two residents of Ahwahnee died fleeing the fire in their car and twenty-two injuries occurred among civilians and firefighters. A law enforcement investigation determined the fire was intentionally set by a local teenager who claimed to be trying to clear away brush; he was charged with arson but found innocent by a jury.

== Background ==
Between 1959 and 1962, California faced a large-scale drought. At the time, it was one of the worst in the state's recorded history, and fire officials anticipated the resulting wildfire risk. They readied 6,000 personnel, 60 air tankers, and dozens of helicopters in advance of the 1961 fire season. Lookouts operated by California's State Division of Forestry (CDF) were staffed beginning on April 15, and the state declared the beginning of the fire season in late April.

== Progression ==
The Harlow Fire began at 10:20 a.m. the morning of July 10, 1961, on Usona Road in the Chowchilla River drainage near Stumpfield Mountain in Mariposa County, near the community of Bootjack. It was first reported by either the Green Mountain fire lookout, who called CDF to relay a smoke sighting, or by the Miami Mountain fire lookout with the Forest Service. Responding CDF personnel discovered a fire that had spread to 2.5 acres (1.0 ha) near Indian Peak, and according to The Fresno Bee "within minutes it was out of control".

By 11:00 a.m. on July 11, the fire had crossed the East Fork Chowchilla River, outflanking firefighters on Miami Mountain and burning along Metcalf Gap Road. By that point it had burned about 8,200 acres (3,300 ha) in total. By noon, 600 personnel—a combination of Forest Service, CDF, and inmate firefighters—were engaged on the fire, led by Forest Service District Ranger Frank Crossfield.

In the afternoon on July 11, the fire began to move with unprecedented rapidity. Winds near the surface were calm, but 1,500 feet (460 m) up they were blowing vigorously out of the northwest, towards the southeast. At some point the Harlow Fire entered an area of thick, dry vegetation near Metcalf Gap and intensified, generating a large convective smoke column. When the column met the prevailing winds it scattered embers and firebrands to the southeast, starting spot fires ahead of the main fire front that themselves grew and intensified. A Forest Service meteorologist described the result as "a full-scale, moving firestorm".

Three distinct fire fronts pushed southeast: one burned directly through Nipinnawasee before diminishing as it entered open oak woodlands less conducive to fire growth; another burned through Ahwahnee before doing the same. The third pushed through the drainages of Cook Creek and the upper Fresno River before turning south up Deadwood Peak. Evacuation plans for Ahwahnee and Nipinnawasee were still being developed by county authorities when the blow-up occurred, destroying all telephone communications lines in the area. Residents and others in the area were dependent on the mobile radios in emergency responders' vehicles to spread the word. The fire burned 18,000 to 23,000 acres (7,300 to 9,300 ha) in two hours, with activity abating by 6:00 p.m. This roughly 31-square-mile (80 km^{2}) expansion marked the fastest fire growth ever recorded in California.

By Wednesday, July 12, seven aircraft had been assigned to the Harlow Fire, flying 30 sorties on the 12th alone to drop borate-based fire retardant on and in front of the fire's flaming front. They included two B-17 Flying Fortress bombers, two PBY Catalina flying boats, two TBM Avenger torpedo bombers, and an "AJ3 Tiger" bomber. That same day, officials ordered the evacuation of campgrounds at Bass Lake. At 12:30 pm, authorities closed California State Route 41 northbound of Coarsegold to traffic. Now 10 miles (16 km) south of Yosemite, the Harlow Fire had by this point burned approximately 37,000 acres (15,000 ha) and its perimeter was 30 percent contained.

The Harlow Fire was declared fully contained on Thursday, July 13. That same day, California governor Pat Brown declared a state of disaster for Madera County at the request of several members of the state legislature. By this time the forces brought to bear on the fire included—in addition to the seven aircraft—67 fire engines and 16 bulldozers, operated by and in concert with 1,820 personnel from several different agencies, including CDF and the Forest Service. The number of personnel peaked at 2,181 on July 14.

Late on the 14th the Harlow Fire escaped its containment lines again in two places, starting spot fires on Thornberry Mountain between Oakhurst and Coarsegold and on Deadwood Mountain. Aircraft, bulldozers, and ground crews all joined forces and managed to subdue the spot fires by 6:00 pm. The fire was declared fully controlled at 10:00 p.m. on July 15. The fire burned 43,329 acres (17,535 ha) in total. Most of the burned area lay on land under Cal Fire's firefighting responsibility, adjacent to the Sierra National Forest. A 1,200-acre (490 ha) portion of the national forest burned.

Many residents who had lost property in the Harlow Fire expressed discontent with the way Cal Fire had fought it, leveling charges that firefighters had either let structures burn while they idled, or not adequately protected them through the use of back-burning or firebreaks. Cecil E. Metcalf, a deputy state forester with Cal Fire who had led the fire suppression effort, denied the claims and argued that the prioritization of life (including that of the firefighters) over property, as well as the speed of the fire, were responsible for the manner in which firefighting had been conducted. The California State Assembly held a hearing on the fire and the firefighting effort in Fresno on October 30, 1961, attended by more than 200 fire area residents and featuring testimony by more than 20 of them.

== Effects ==
Hundreds of people, largely children at various summer camps, were forced to evacuate from the Bass Lake area. The Fresno Bee reported minor incidents of looting in evacuated areas in Oakhurst. The Red Cross chapter in Madera County helped organize emergency relief efforts for those displaced by the fire, distributing supplies (such as tubs, soap, water, and food) and information alike from a post set up in the Aragon Hotel in the city of Madera. The American Red Cross later provided a further $71,000 (about $568,907 in 2024) in grants to fire victims.

Two people died in the Harlow Fire. Ahwahnee residents George and Edna Kipp were killed on Road 628 (or Roundhouse Road), two miles (3.2 km) north of Ahwahnee, when their car became stuck on the unpaved road. George Kipp was found deceased at the scene inside the vehicle; Edna Kipp died later that day at the Madera County Hospital. Their causes of death were listed as burns and asphyxiation respectively. Twenty-two other people were injured in the fire. At least one firefighter was injured after cutting their foot with an axe.

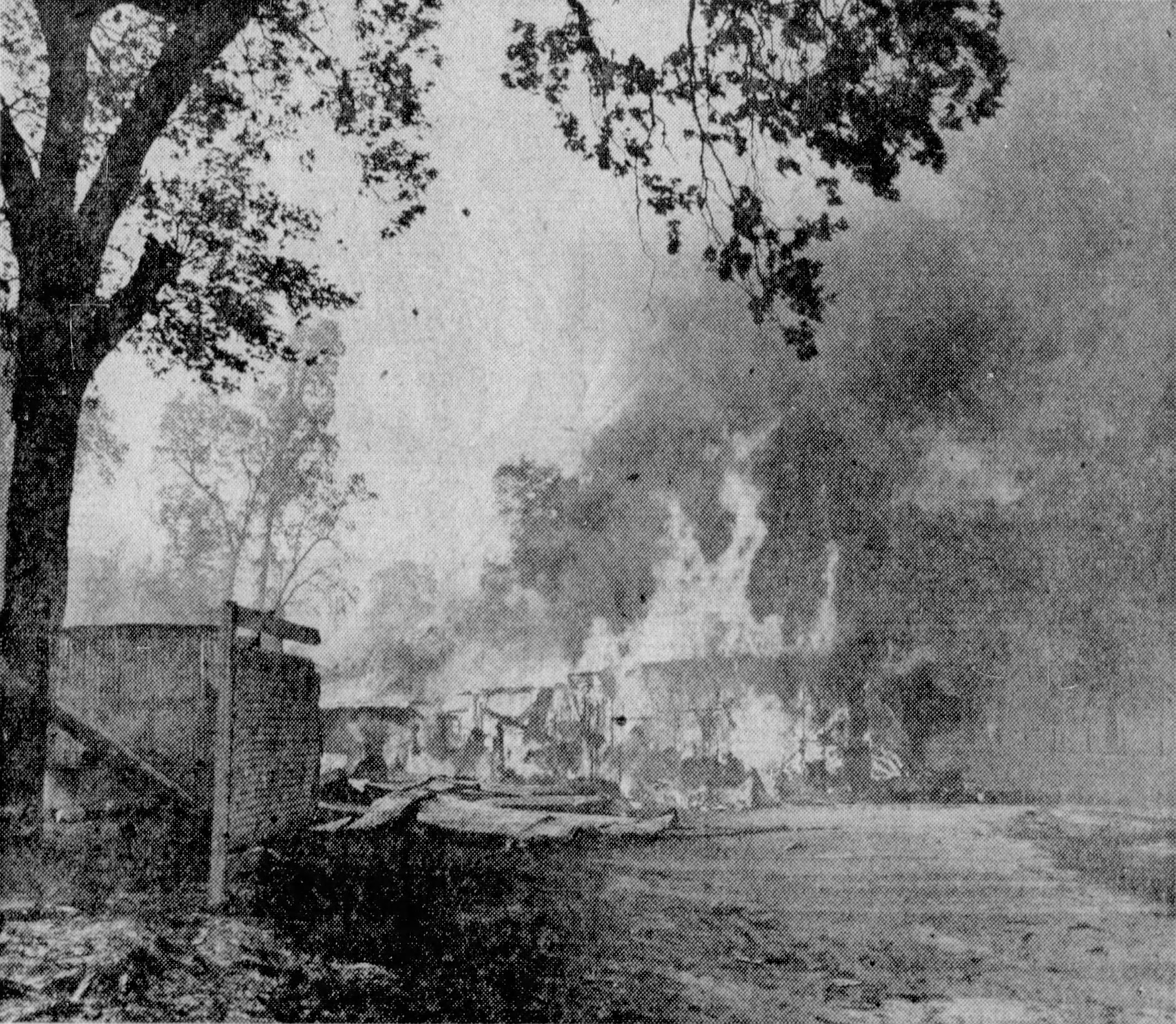
The post office building in Ahwahnee as it burned in the fire

The fire destroyed 106 structures and consequently numbered among California's twenty most destructive recorded wildfires for at least 40 years before being supplanted by others. At least 78 of the burned structures were homes or outbuildings, though stores, taverns, three sawmills, and other various establishments also burned. Another 20 dwellings were damaged. Only 35 of the damaged or destroyed homes had insurance. In Nipinnawasee, along with many homes the fire also destroyed the town's post office, grocery store, gas station, and the Nipinnawasee Hotel. In Ahwahnee the toll included the post office, gas station, the Sierra Grocery, and the Ahwahnee Inn. Fifty of Ahwahnee's 60 buildings were destroyed, as were 10 of Nipinnawasee's 12. Losses amounted to $2 million, roughly equivalent to $16 million in 2024. Ahwahnee, benefiting from the help of Red Cross donations and Small Business Administration loans, rebuilt and largely recovered in the following years. Nipinnawasee "never revived", according to a Madera Tribune report six years after the fire.

The fire destroyed several thousand acres of commercial timber stands, including a large reforestation project begun in the wake of the Nelson Cove Fire in 1959. More than 5,000 acres (2,000 ha) of the burn area were re-seeded in early November by aircraft that dropped more than 22 short tons (20,000 kg) of rye grass seed. The effort was organized by the Madera County Farm Advisors and several local figures.

The 2021 River Fire and the 2022 Oak Fire both reburned portions of the Harlow Fire's footprint.

== Cause ==
An investigator with the Madera County District attorney's office and an officer with Cal Fire spent several days in the Harlow Fire area questioning residents. They eventually narrowed down their inquiries to Fredrick E. Litke, a teenager who had been one of the first people at the scene of the fire and had helped fight it, suffering a burned ear. The investigators took Litke in for questioning in Madera on July 25. After eight hours of questioning and a failed polygraph test, he allegedly confessed the following day. He had been employed at the nearby Harlow Ranch and, according to his version of events, had set the fire alight on July 10—his 18th birthday—with matches after hearing another employee muse that it would be easier to round up the ranch's horses if some brush were burned. Litke claimed he had counted on the fire burning out once it reached a horse trail on the ridgetop above the point of ignition.

The following day, Litke was charged with one count of arson and two counts of murder. When the case went before the Madera County grand jury on August 23, the jury dropped the murder charges and reduced the count of arson to one count of "starting a forest fire". The matter then entered Madera County Superior Court, going to trial on December 18. Two days of testimony followed, during which Litke's defense counsel maintained that his confession had been made under duress. On December 20, 1961, after two hours of deliberation, the twelve-member Superior Court jury unanimously found Litke innocent. The jury indicated that their decision was made partly because they felt malice did not figure into Litke's alleged decision to set the fire, having heard a doctor testify that Litke was emotionally immature and insecure.

Cal Fire officially records the cause of the Harlow Fire as arson.

== See also ==
- List of California wildfires
