= Wassama Round House State Historic Park =

California State Historic Park

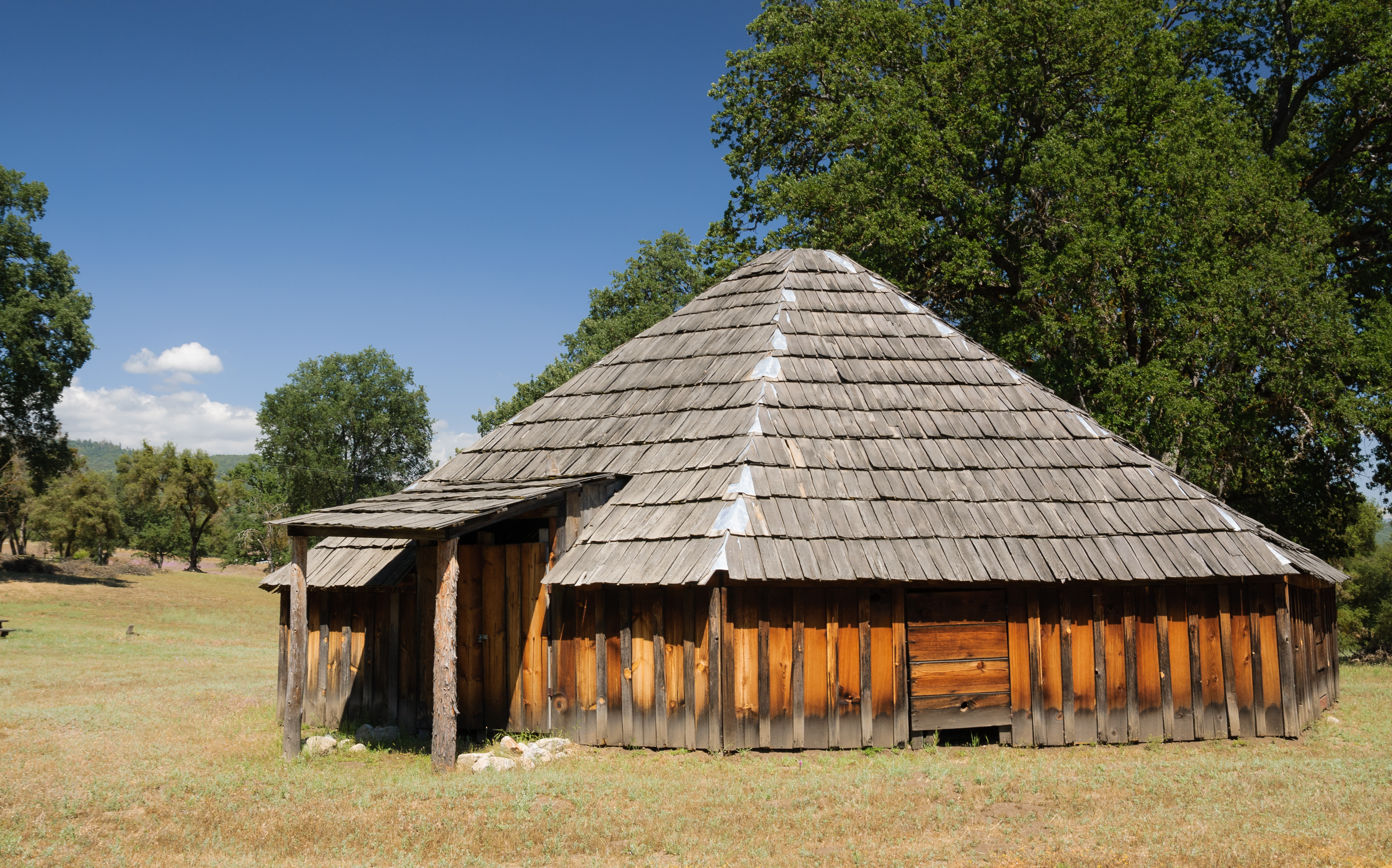
- Wassama Round House

- Location within California
- Location: Madera County, California
- Nearest city: Ahwahnee
- Coordinates: 37°22′28″N 119°43′19″W
- Governing body: State of California

California Historical Landmark
- Official name: Wassama Roundhouse
- Reference no.: 1001

The Wassama Round House State Historic Park is in the Sierra Nevada foothills, in Madera County of central California.

== Californian Native Americans ==
The park and Round House is used by local Native Americans as a ceremonial meeting place. Gathering Day, held the third Saturday of October, includes demonstrations of dancing, crafts and basket weaving.

The Wassama Roundhouse is a reconstruction built in 1985 upon the location of four previous such houses. Originally dating prior to the 1860s, the roundhouses served as the focal point of spiritual and ceremonial life for many Native Californians. In 1903, the third roundhouse was built using portions of the center pole from the two earlier houses. It is California Historical Landmark #1001.

== Access ==
Wassama Round House State Historic Park is off California State Route 49, five miles northwest of Oakhurst, California. The park features special events and tours.

=== Proposed for closure ===
The park was one of the 48 California state parks proposed for closure in January 2008 by California's Governor Arnold Schwarzenegger as part of a deficit reduction program. The Wassama Round House State Historic Park remains open.

== See also ==
- Miwok
- Mono people
- Indigenous peoples of California
