= List of California State Historic Parks =

List of California State Historic Parks — a division of the California Department of Parks and Recreation, for historic sites in California.

== List ==
- Anderson Marsh State Historic Park
- Antelope Valley Indian Museum State Historic Park
- Bale Grist Mill State Historic Park
- Benicia Capitol State Historic Park
- Bidwell Mansion State Historic Park
- Bodie State Historic Park
- California Citrus State Historic Park
- Chumash Painted Cave State Historic Park
- Colonel Allensworth State Historic Park
- Columbia State Historic Park
- El Presidio de Santa Barbara State Historic Park
- Empire Mine State Historic Park
- Folsom Powerhouse State Historic Park
- Fort Humboldt State Historic Park
- Fort Ross State Historic Park
- Fort Tejon State Historic Park
- Governor's Mansion State Historic Park
- Hearst San Simeon State Historical Monument
- Indian Grinding Rock State Historic Park
- Jack London State Historic Park
- La Purísima Mission State Historic Park
- Leland Stanford Mansion State Historic Park
- Los Angeles State Historic Park
- Los Encinos State Historic Park
- Malakoff Diggins State Historic Park
- Marconi Conference Center State Historic Park
- Marshall Gold Discovery State Historic Park
- Monterey State Historic Park
- Old Sacramento State Historic Park
- Old Town San Diego State Historic Park
- Olompali State Historic Park
- Petaluma Adobe State Historic Park
- Pigeon Point Light Station State Historic Park
- Pío Pico State Historic Park
- Point Sur State Historic Park
- Railtown 1897 State Historic Park
- Robert Louis Stevenson State Park
- San Juan Bautista State Historic Park
- San Pasqual Battlefield State Historic Park
- Santa Cruz Mission State Historic Park
- Santa Susana Pass State Historic Park
- Shasta State Historic Park
- Sonoma State Historic Park
- State Indian Museum State Historic Park
- Sutter's Fort State Historic Park
- Tomo-Kahni State Historic Park
- Wassama Round House State Historic Park
- Watts Towers of Simon Rodia State Historic Park
- Weaverville Joss House State Historic Park
- Will Rogers State Historic Park
- William B. Ide Adobe State Historic Park
- Woodland Opera House State Historic Park

== See also ==
- List of California state parks, which includes this list
- List of National Historic Landmarks in California, which overlaps with this list
- List of Registered Historic Places in California, which overlaps with this list
- List of state beaches in California
