= Jay Spurgeon =

American baseball player (born 1976)

- Pitcher
- Born: July 5, 1976 (age 49); West Covina, California, U.S.
- Batted: Right Threw: Right

MLB debut
- August 15, 2000, for the Baltimore Orioles

Last MLB appearance
- September 28, 2000, for the Baltimore Orioles

MLB statistics
- Win–loss record: 1–1
- Earned run average: 6.00
- Strikeouts: 11
- Stats at Baseball Reference

Teams
- Baltimore Orioles (2000)

Jay Spurgeon (born July 5, 1976) is an American former professional baseball pitcher who appeared in seven games for the Baltimore Orioles during the 2000 Major League Baseball season.

== Career ==
A native of West Covina, California, Spurgeon attended Yosemite High School. He was selected by the Houston Astros in the 46th round of the 1994 MLB draft but opted to play college baseball at the University of Hawaiʻi. In 1996, he played collegiate summer baseball with the Brewster Whitecaps of the Cape Cod Baseball League. Spurgeon was selected by the Orioles in the 8th round of the 1997 Major League Baseball draft, and played briefly at the major league level in 2000.
