= Yosemite High School =

Public high school in Oakhurst, California, US

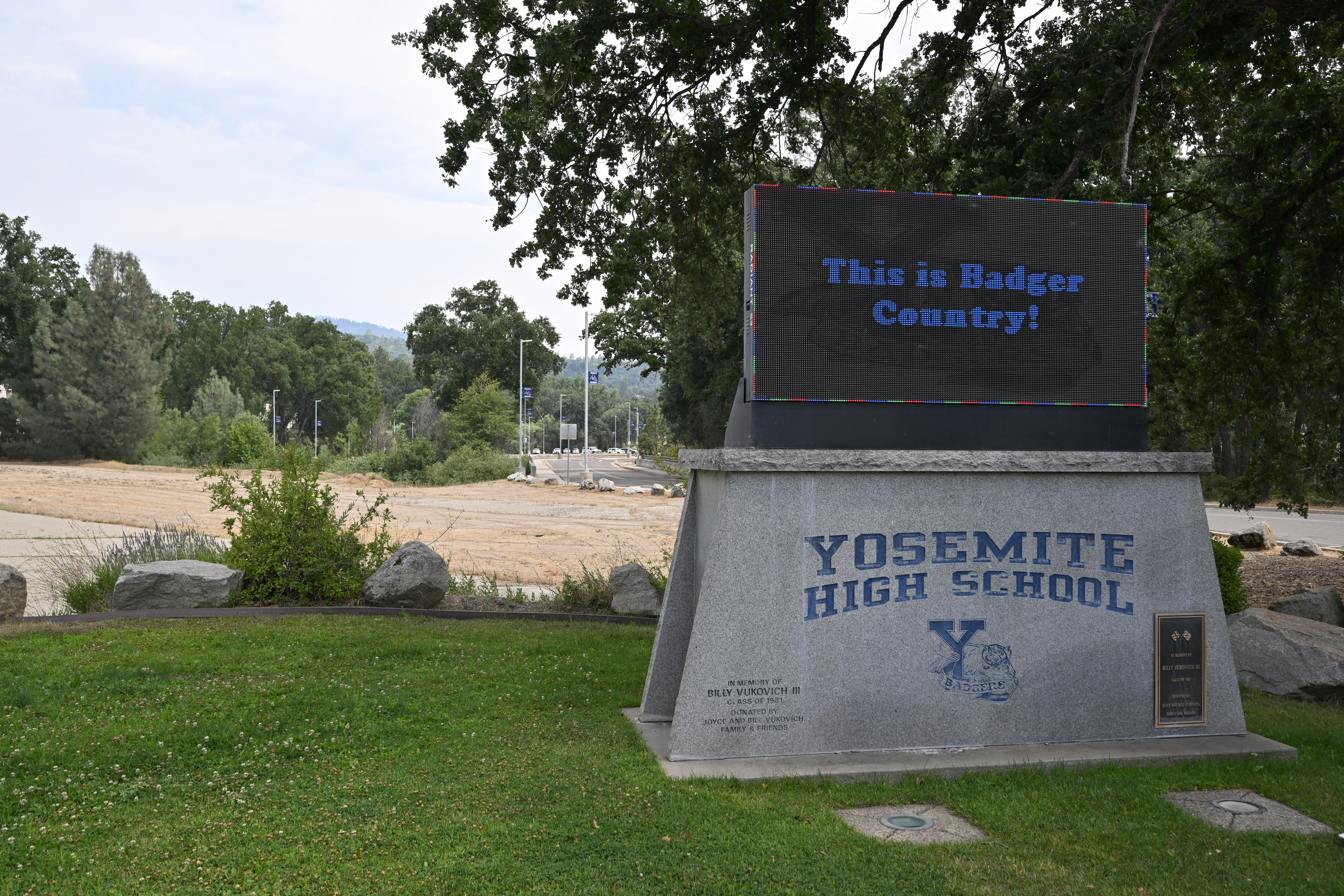

Location
- 50200 Rd 427; Oakhurst, CA 93644; United States
- 37.329048°N 119.632257°W

Information
- Type: Comprehensive Public High School
- Established: September 1976
- School district: Yosemite Unified School District
- NCES District ID: 0600160
- NCES School ID: 060016007023
- Principal: Jessica Fairbanks
- Teaching staff: 23.90 (FTE)
- Grades: 9-12
- Enrollment: 553 (2022-2023)
- Student to teacher ratio: 23.14
- Campus size: 100 acres
- Campus type: Rural
- Colors: Navy, white, and light blue
- Team name: Badgers
- Communities served: Oakhurst, California
- Feeder schools: Coarsegold Elementary; Raymond-Knowles Elementary; Rivergold Elementary; Wasuma Elementary; Oak Creek Intermediate
- Website: www.yosemiteusd.com/Yosemite/
- Last updated: 30 April 2024

Yosemite High School (YHS) is a secondary school in the Yosemite Unified School District in Oakhurst, California. YHS occupies 100 acres (0.40 km^{2}) of rolling, wooded hills and is located within the foothills of California's Sierra Nevada. Yosemite High School was recognized as a California Distinguished School in 2001 and 2005. The school opened in September 1976 and enrollment in 2020-2021 was 537 students.

== Campus ==
Yosemite High School is located in the Sierra Nevada foothills in the rural community of Oakhurst, 12 miles (19 km) from the south entrance to Yosemite National Park in Central California. The campus is on a 100-acre (40 ha) site with pines, oaks, and seasonal streams with views of the High Sierra.

== Academics ==
Yosemite High School features an International Baccalaureate (IB) program and also offers Advanced Placement courses and a dual credit program with the State Center Community College District (SCCCD). In addition to a rigorous academic program, YHS also provides a comprehensive vocational program. Title I programs, Math and Language Labs provide students with assistance in passing proficiency exams.

The school received a Western Association of Schools and Colleges six-year accreditation during the 2014-2015 school year. In addition, YHS was recognized by the Campaign for Business and Education Excellence as a 2018-2019 Educational Results Partnership Honor Roll School.

=== Controversial teaching methods ===
When the school originally opened, its unorthodox education methods raised concerns. Students (referred to as “learners”) chose their own classes, handled their own attendance, and gave themselves their grades. Teachers (referred to as “learning facilitators”) were also given free rein with the classes they taught, resulting in such classes as skateboarding and rock climbing. They taught in a single large building with simultaneous classes operating without walls, leading to a good deal of confusion and distraction. Although 6-foot (1.8 m) tall partitions were soon set up, they did little to reduce the noise.

In recent years, YHS has returned to more traditional academic practices, including fixed schedules, standard classrooms, state-mandated coursework and grading criteria, and referring to "teachers" and "students."

== Extracurricular activities ==
=== Academic competitions ===
Yosemite High School's Mock Trial (MT) team has competed for all 39 years of competition in Madera County and has won 32 times. Most recently in 2023.

YHS teams often excel in the Academic Decathlon (AD) competition, having won sixteen consecutive Madera County titles as of 2009, in addition to having taken first place twice in 2000 and 2001 and second place at the state level multiple times, most recently in 2006 and 2007.

=== Music ===
Yosemite High School's Music department currently offers a concert choir, a concert band, a wind ensemble, a marching band, and a jazz band as well as instruction in music appreciation. During football season the marching band performs as a pep band.

=== California Cadet Corps ===
Yosemite is the home to a distinguished unit in the California Cadet Corps, the 66th Battalion (Badger Battalion). YHS is also the site of Headquarters, 5th Brigade. The 5th Brigade encompasses Fresno and the surrounding area.

=== Athletics ===
Yosemite fields interscholastic teams in fifteen sports. It is a member of the Northwest Sequoia League in the Central Section of the California Interscholastic Federation (CIF).

== Student demographics ==
As of 2020-2021, the ethnic breakdown of the student population at YHS was 17.8% White, 80.9% Hispanic, 6.5% Two or More Races, 3.0% American Indian or Alaska Native, 1.3% Asian/Pacific Islander, and 0.2% Filipino (0.2% not reported).

== Notable alumni ==
- Chynna Clugston Flores – comic book editor, penciler, writer, inker, colorist, letterer and cover artist
- Ted Lilly – former Major League Baseball pitcher
- Lee Newton – actress
- Cole Popovich – National Football League offensive line coach
- Jay Spurgeon – former Major League Baseball pitcher
- Eric Demeusy - director of the film Proximity
