= Tomo-Kahni State Historic Park =

Historic site in california

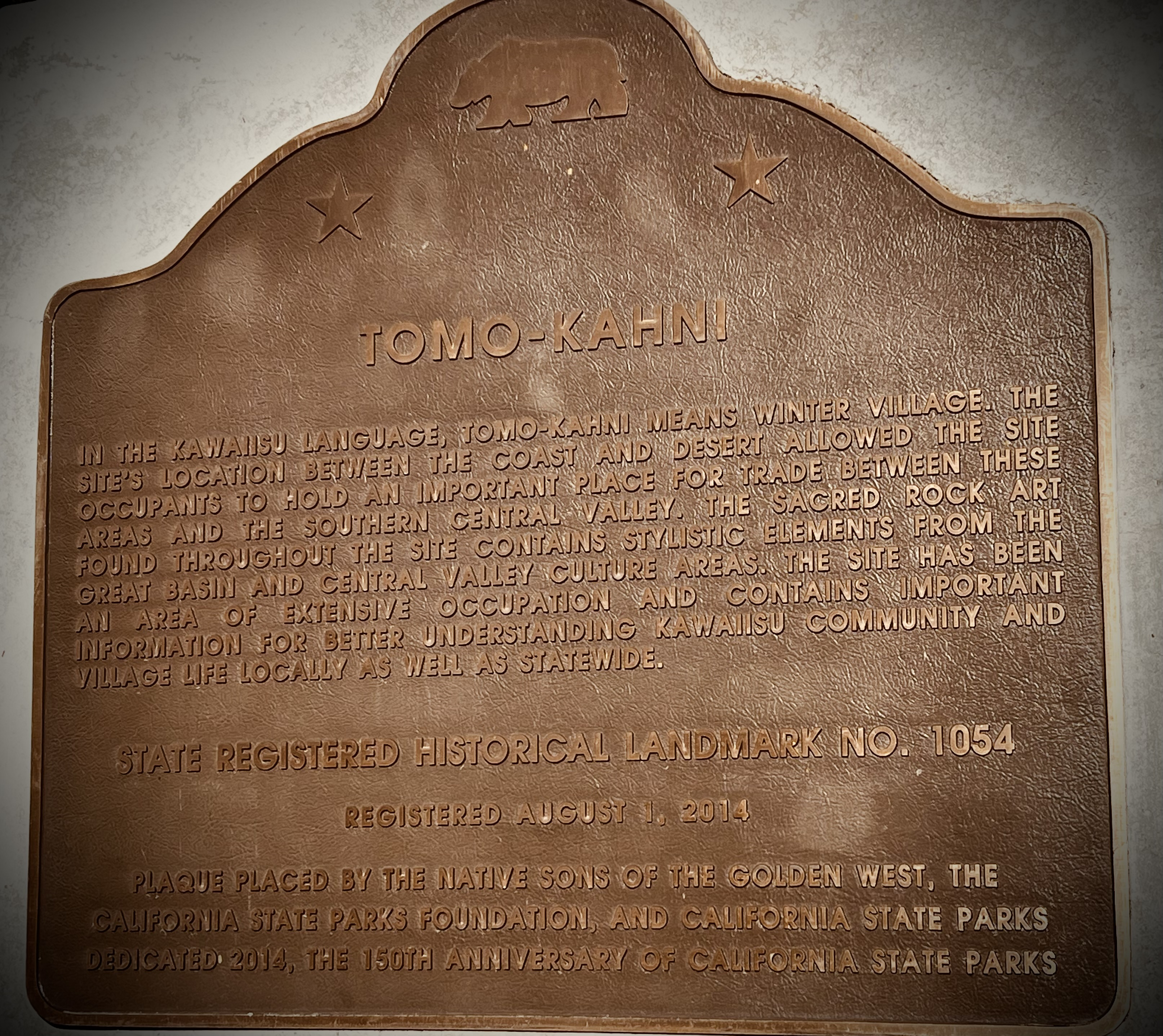
- Plaque erected August 2014

- Location within California Location within the United States
- Location: Kern County, California, United States
- Nearest city: Tehachapi, California
- Coordinates: 35°14′8″N 118°35′00″W
- Area: 571.69 acres (231.35 ha)
- Established: 1993
- Governing body: California Department of Parks and Recreation

Tomo-Kahni State Historic Park is a state historic park located in Tehachapi, Kern County, California. Designated as a state park in 1993 by California, with the agreement of elderly members of the native tribe, the land encompassing Tomo-Kahni was a settlement established by the Kawaiisu people. The area was not short of resources, making it a fine place to settle for the Kawaiisu. The park is home to many rock art artifacts by the native tribe that lived there. Utilized to protect the people from winter weather, the settlement's name comes from the language of the Kawaiisu, meaning "winter home". Many bedrock mortars remain at the site, acting as evidence for the Kawaiisu peoples' Tomo-Kahni settlement.

== See also ==
List of California State Historic Parks
