= William B. Ide Adobe State Historic Park =

Historic site in California, United States

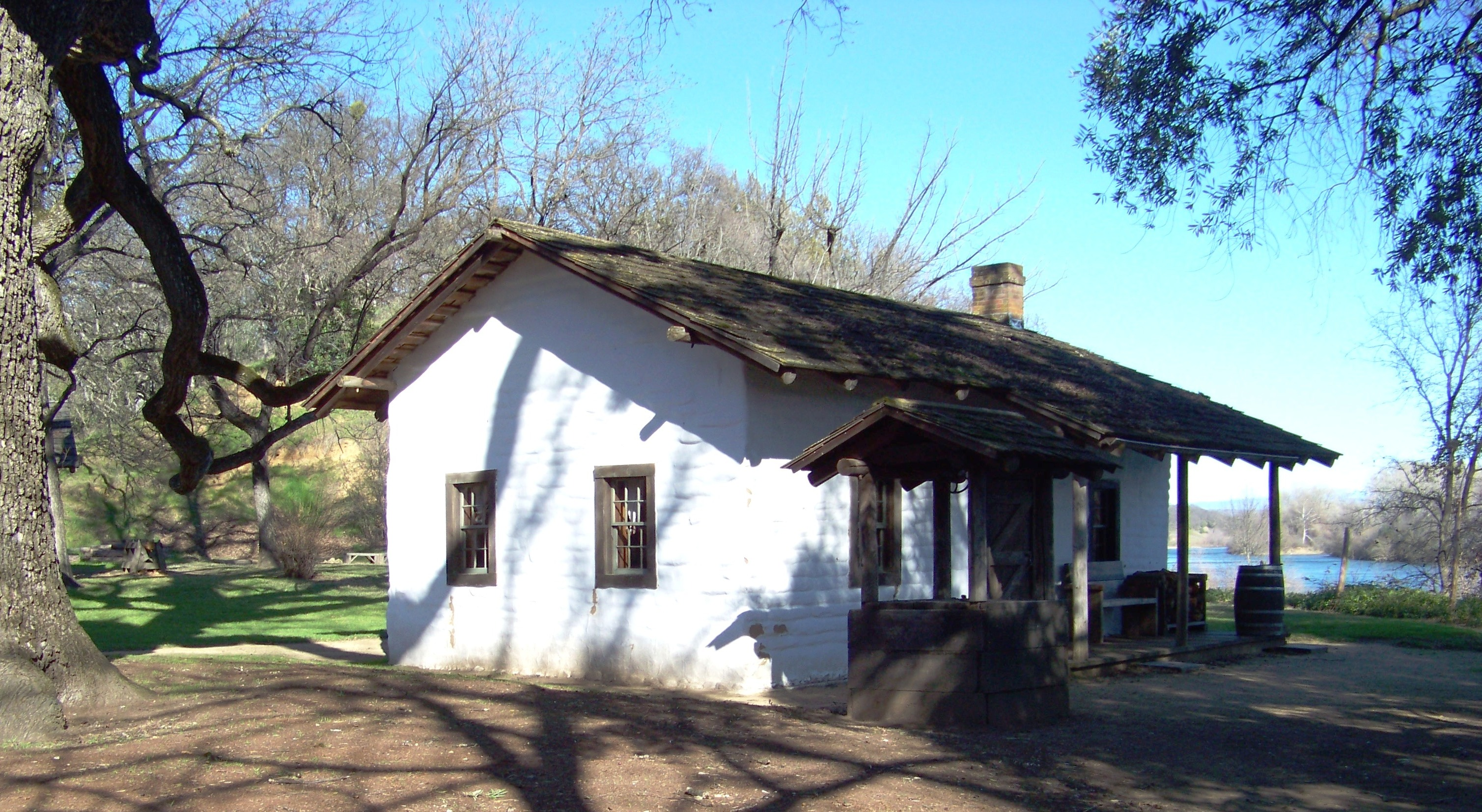
- Front of the adobe in 2011
- Interactive map of William B. Ide Adobe State Historic Park
- Nearest city: Red Bluff, California
- Coordinates: 40.1968°N 122.2252°W
- Governing body: State of California

California Historical Landmark
- Reference no.: 12

William B. Ide Adobe State Historic Park is a California State Historic Park located on the west bank of the Sacramento River, a mile north of Red Bluff in Tehama County, California. Although it was initially believed that Ide built the adobe, research has shown that he never lived in the place that bears his name today. Nevertheless, the State of California decided to keep the name of the park in recognition of Ide's role in California history.

== William B. Ide ==
The park memorializes William Brown Ide, a California pioneer, captain of the Bear Flag Revolt and the only president of the California Republic, which lasted from June 14 to July 9, 1846.

== Adobe ==
A. M. Dibble, an early settler in Red Bluff, built the adobe in 1852. There were approximately 20 different property owners up to 1942. A. Mount and Willette Mount owned the property for the longest period which was from 1882 to 1913. William B. Ide has incorrectly been credited to being one of the property owners, though he never owned the property or lived in the adobe; Mr. Ide actually owned land downriver from the adobe property. It was decided in 1940s to make the adobe site into a state park. The state of California acquired the land in the 1950s, and the park was dedicated in 1960. The park was named after William B. Ide to honor his contribution to California's history.

== New museum ==
The park includes a restored adobe housing a museum, and a recreated 1850s homestead, with replicas of a typical schoolhouse, wood shop, and blacksmith shop, as well as a small visitor center. A picnic area overlooks the Sacramento River. There are several interpretive program events scheduled throughout the year: Ide's Ferry Championship Horseshoe Pitchers Contest in June, Adobe Day in September, and a Pioneer Christmas Party in December. School programs are also offered to students visiting the museum: "Life in the 1850s", which is an all-day program, and "Mini-Life in the 1850s", which is a 1–2 hour program. Volunteers in Parks is another program which encourages visitors to become volunteers at the park. Additional interpretive programs include demonstrations of pioneer crafts and period parties, as well as performances by the Ide Adobe Players, a Gold Rush-era band, and Gold Rush Gambling, which gives visitors to the park an opportunity to play faro, monte, shut the box and other games which were common during that time.

== Gallery ==
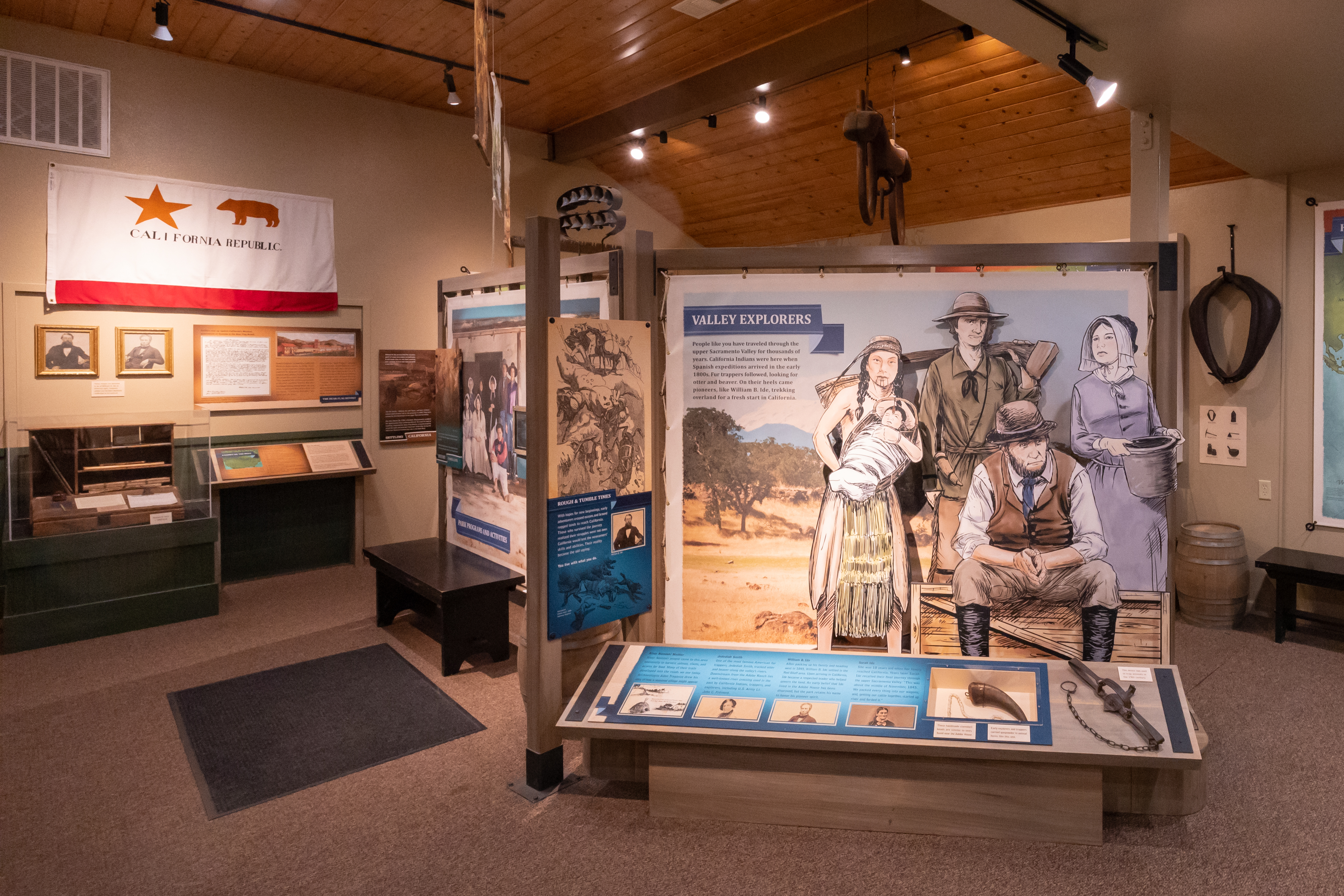
Interior view of the visitor center

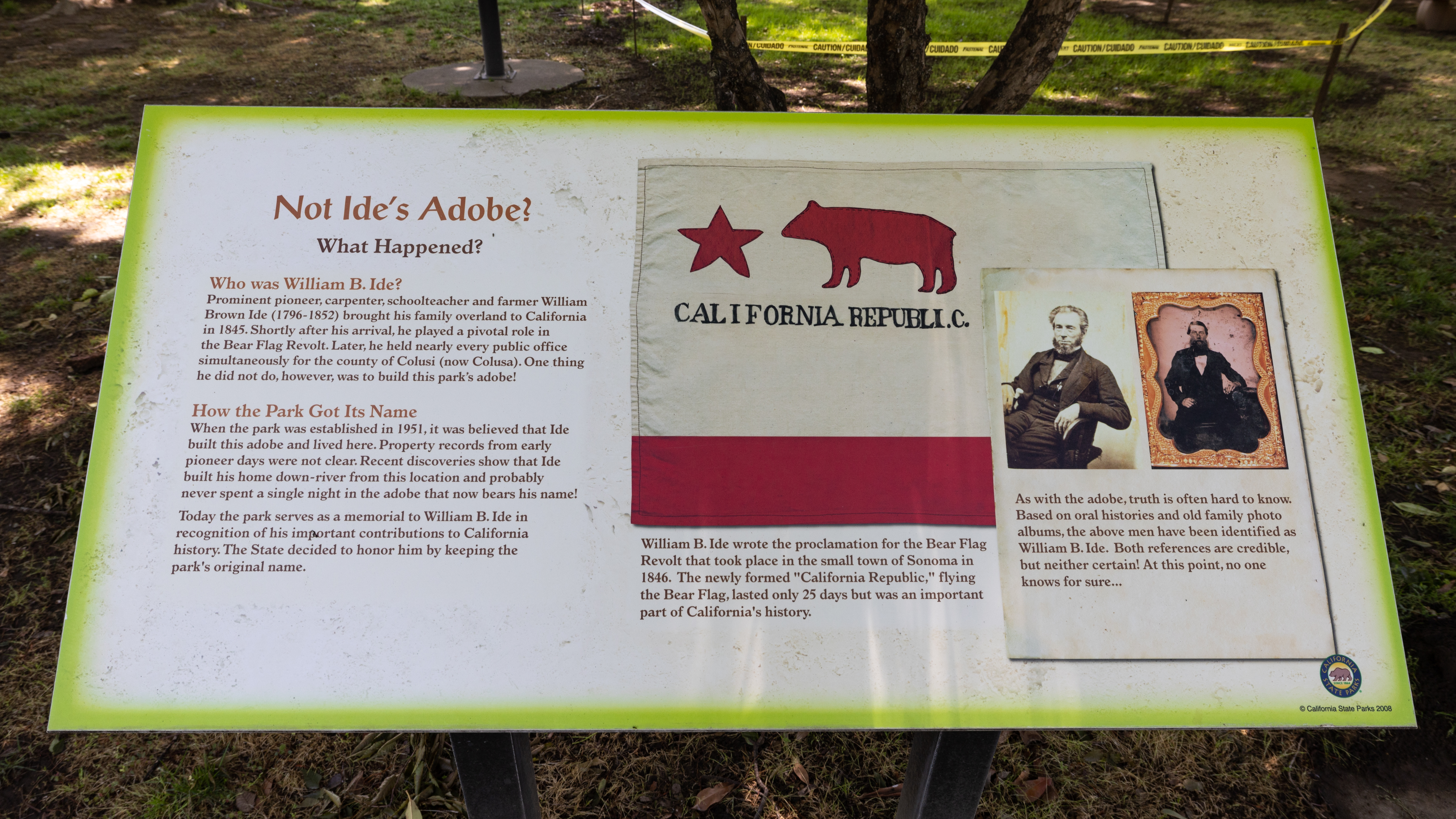
Sign explaining that William B. Ide never lived here

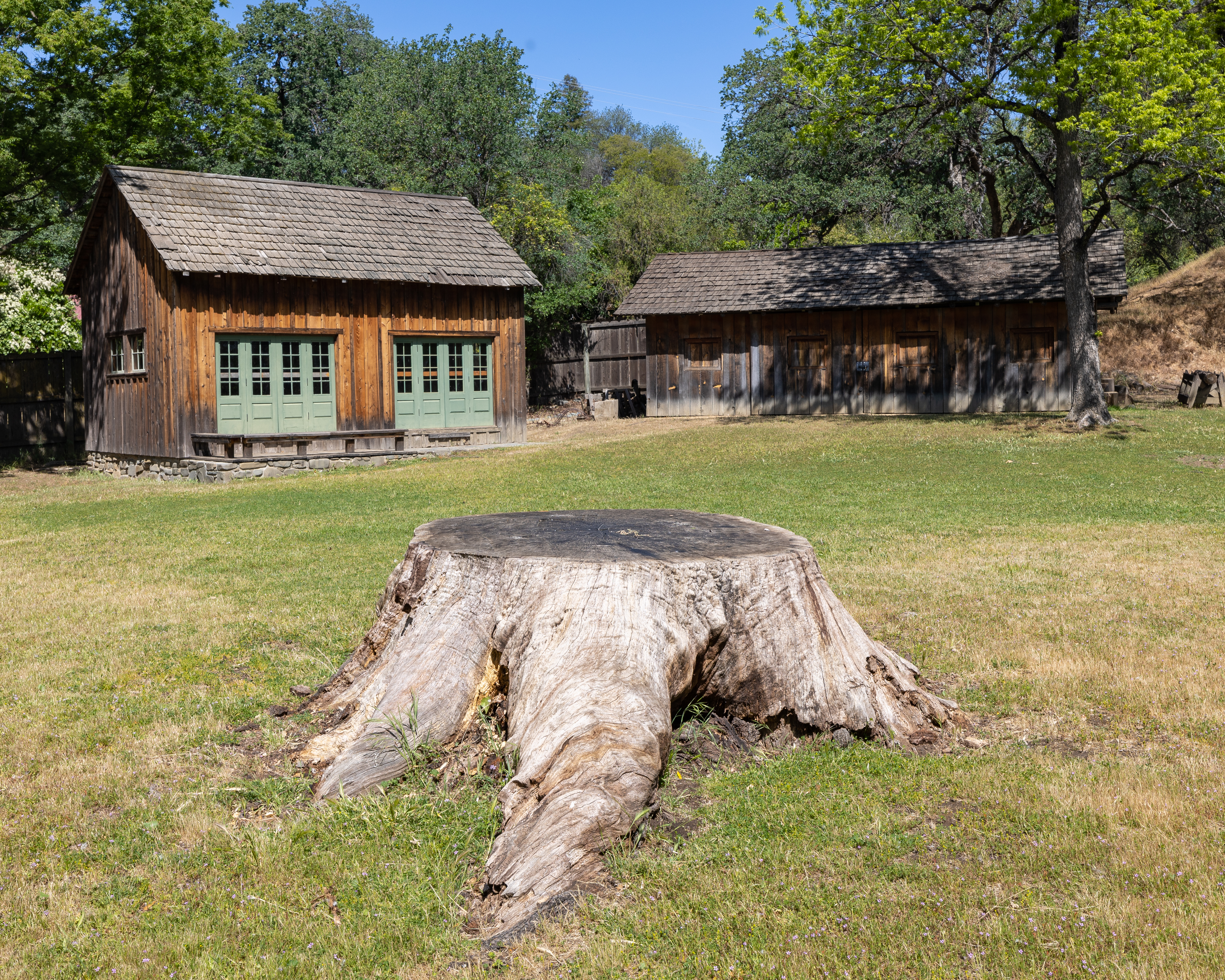
Replica of a wood shop / schoolhouse (left) and blacksmith shop (right); in the front the stump of a valley oak taken down in 2016

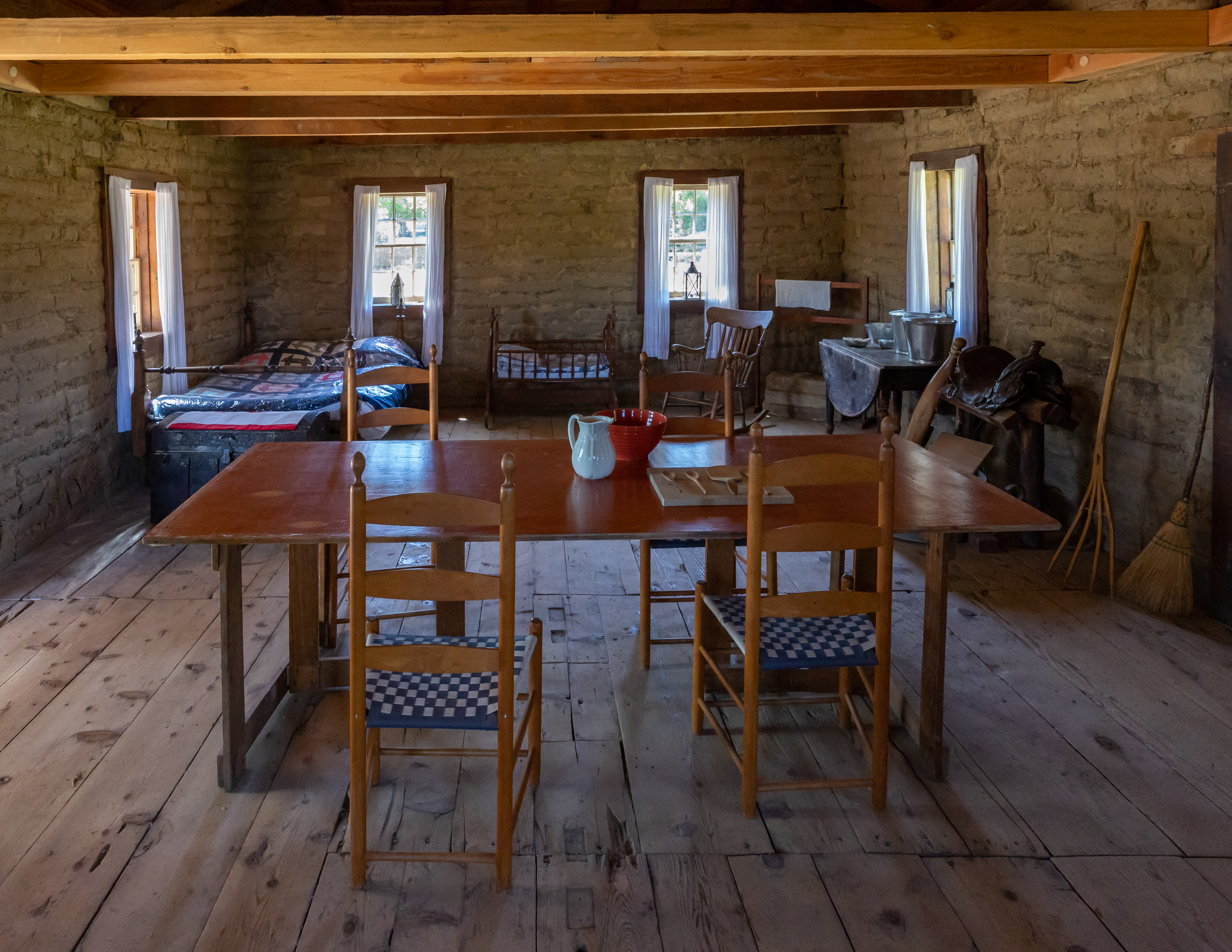
Interior of the adobe

== See also ==
- National Register of Historic Places listings in Shasta County, California
- List of California State Historic Parks
