= Carmen Bricillo =

American football coach (born 1976)

Tennessee Titans
- Title: Offensive line coach

Personal information
- Born: June 14, 1976 (age 50); Shelocta, Pennsylvania, U.S.

Career information
- Position: Center
- High school: Indiana Area High School (Indiana, Pennsylvania)
- College: Duquesne

Career history
- Indiana Area HS (2003–2004) Assistant coach; Duquesne (2005) Offensive line coach; Akron (2006–2008) Coaching assistant; Illinois (2009) Offensive assistant; Youngstown State (2010–2018) Offensive line coach; New England Patriots (2019) Coaching assistant; New England Patriots (2020) Co-offensive line coach; New England Patriots (2021) Offensive line coach; Las Vegas Raiders (2022–2023) Offensive line coach; New York Giants (2024–2025) Offensive line coach; Tennessee Titans (2026–present) Offensive line coach

Carmen Bricillo (born June 14, 1976) is an American football coach who is the offensive line coach for the Tennessee Titans of the National Football League (NFL). He previously served as an assistant coach for the New York Giants, Las Vegas Raiders, and New England Patriots.

Bricillo began his coaching career in the NFL after playing and coaching college and high school football.

== Coaching career ==
=== College coaching ===
After two years of coaching high school football, Carmen began his college coaching career at his alma mater, Duquesne, as the team's offensive line coach in 2005. From 2006 to 2008 he worked as a coaching assistant at Akron while he earned a master's in sports science and coaching at the university. Bricillo spent the 2009 season as an offensive assistant coach at Illinois. He spent the next nine years coaching the offensive line at Youngstown State.

=== New England Patriots ===
Bricillo made the jump to the NFL in 2019 when he was hired as a coaching assistant with the New England Patriots. The following year, he was promoted to co-offensive line coach for the 2020 season alongside Cole Popovich, the two of whom would replace the retiring Dante Scarnecchia. Before the 2021 season, Bricillo was named the sole offensive line coach of the Patriots after Popovich was fired for refusing to take the Covid-19 vaccine.

=== Las Vegas Raiders ===
On February 12, 2022, Bricillo was hired by the Las Vegas Raiders as their offensive line coach under head coach Josh McDaniels.

=== New York Giants ===
On January 11, 2024, Bricillo was hired by the New York Giants as their offensive line coach under head coach Brian Daboll.

=== Tennessee Titans ===
After not being retained by the Giants following the 2025 season, Bricillo was hired by the Tennessee Titans on January 28, 2026, as their offensive line coach under head coach Robert Saleh.
