= Ahwahnee, California =

- Census-designated place
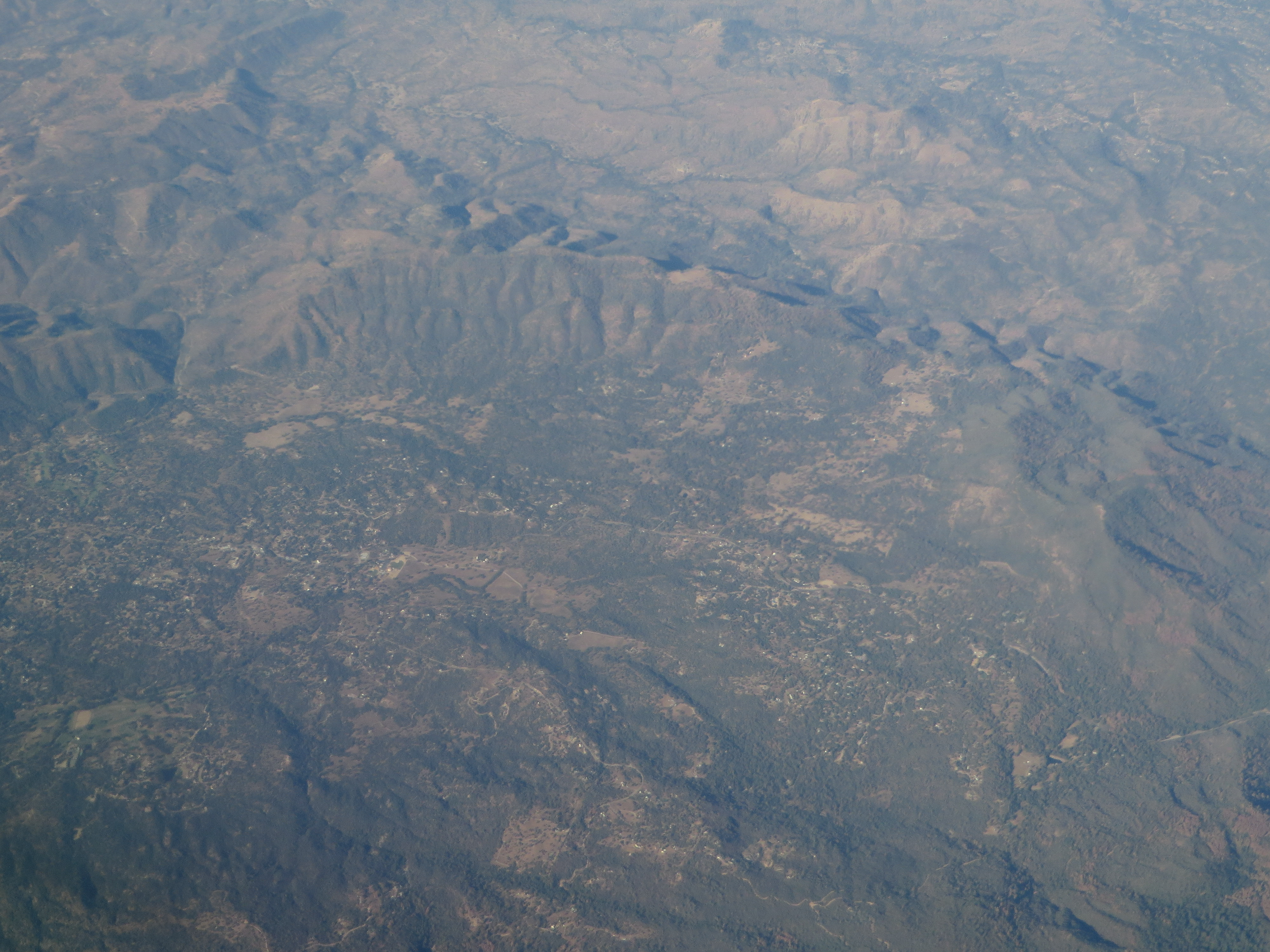
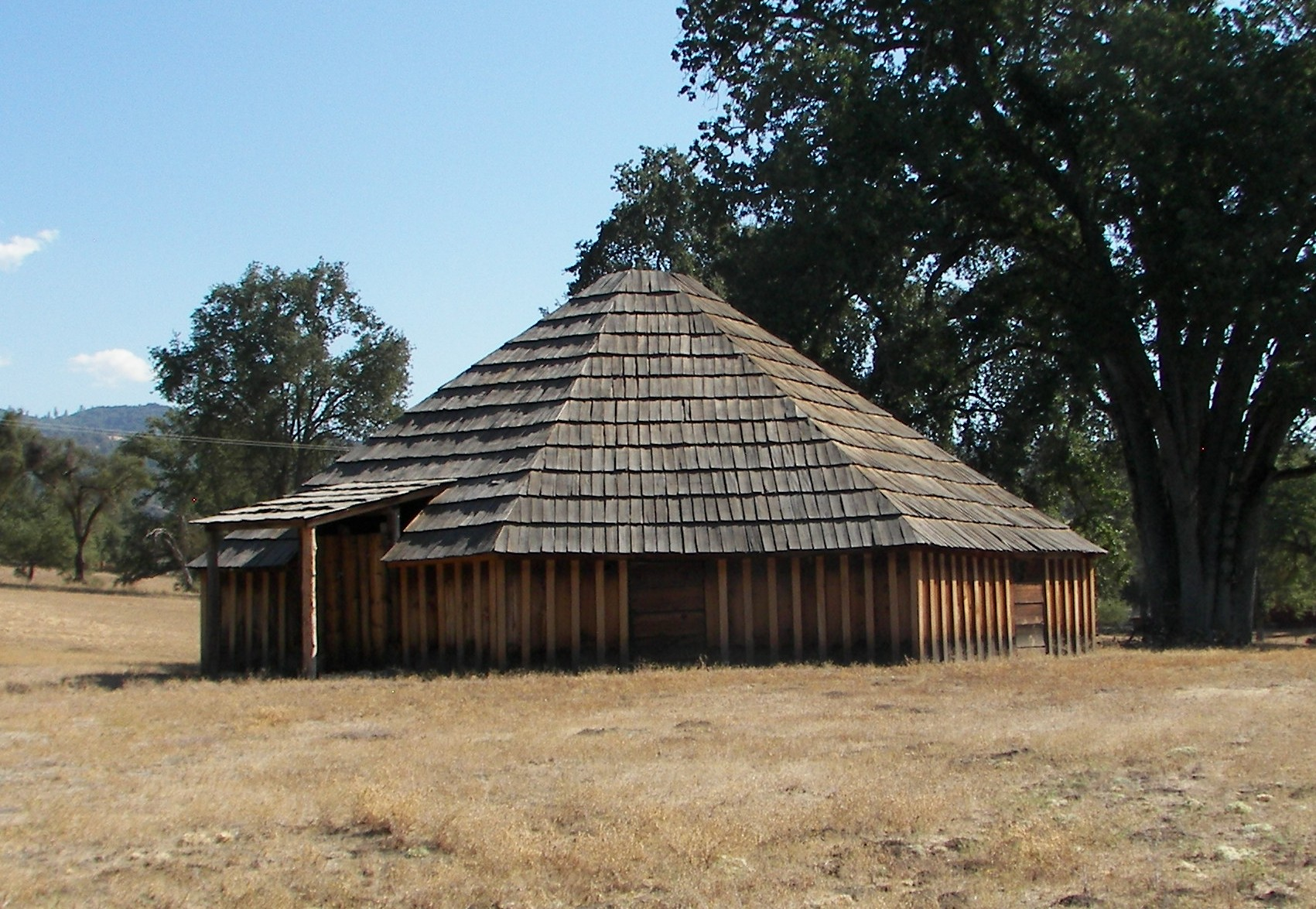
- Aerial view of Ahwahnee Wassama Roundhouse

- Location within California Location within the United States
- Coordinates: 37°21′56″N 119°43′35″W
- Country: United States
- State: California
- County: Madera

Area
  - Total: 11.54 sq mi (29.90 km^{2})
  - Land: 11.54 sq mi (29.90 km^{2})
  - Water: 0 sq mi (0.00 km^{2}) 0%
- Elevation: 2,326 ft (709 m)

Population (2020)
  - Total: 2,296
  - Density: 199/sq mi (76.8/km^{2})
- Time zone: UTC-8 (Pacific (PST))
  - Summer (DST): UTC-7 (PDT)
- ZIP Code: 93601
- Area code: 559
- GNIS feature IDs: 256142; 2628702
- FIPS code: 06-00478

Ahwahnee is a census-designated place (CDP) in Madera County, California, United States. It lies in the western foothills of the Sierra Nevada at an elevation of 2,326 feet (709 m), about 5.25 miles (8.45 km) west of Yosemite Forks. The population was 2,296 at the 2020 United States census. Historically a midway stop on the Raymond–Wawona stagecoach route to Yosemite, Ahwahnee later became the site of the Tri-County Tuberculosis Sanatorium, which operated from 1919 to 1969. The area includes Ahwahnee Hills Regional Park, on the former sanatorium grounds, and Wassama Round House State Historic Park, a reconstructed Miwok ceremonial site.

== History ==
=== Indigenous history ===
Southern Sierra Miwok communities lived for thousands of years around present-day Ahwahnee, near the boundary with neighboring Yokuts peoples. In 1907, ethnologist C. Hart Merriam recorded a Southern Sierra Miwok village called Was-sa'-ma on Wassama Creek near the Ahwahnee stage station. Ethnologist Samuel Alfred Barrett recorded Wasa'ma as the Native name for the site of present-day Ahwahnee. The name Ahwahnee instead came from awa'ni, a Native name associated with Yosemite Valley.

Southern Sierra Miwok communities hunted, fished, gathered acorns and other plants, and used fire to manage plants important for food and basketry. The California Gold Rush brought miners and settlers into the southern Sierra Nevada beginning in 1849, resulting in the displacement of Native communities. During the Mariposa War, the state-sponsored Mariposa Battalion attacked Native settlements and destroyed villages and stores of acorns.

Wassama Round House State Historic Park preserves part of the Wassama village and ceremonial site. The first documented roundhouse there was recorded in 1858; another, built in the 1880s, was burned in 1893 after the death of its chief, and a new roundhouse was built in 1903. In 1912, Chief Peter Westfall applied for a 78.6-acre federal allotment that included the roundhouse, which the government granted in the early 1920s. When Westfall died in 1924, he asked that the roundhouse not be burned, and it remained in use. Described as the "last chief of the Ahwahnee Indians," Westfall lay in state in the roundhouse; his funeral drew mourners from across the foothills.

The property was sold to non-Native owners in 1952, limiting Native access to the roundhouse. In the early 1970s, Native residents of Ahwahnee, Coarsegold, and Oakhurst formed the Wassama Roundhouse Association to preserve the site. California State Parks acquired the property in 1978. After the old roundhouse collapsed, Native American volunteers and park staff built the present structure, which was dedicated in 1985. Southern Sierra Miwok and Chukchansi Yokuts people continue to use the site for traditional gatherings and ceremonies.

=== Stagecoach Era (1890s–1910s) ===
Ahwahnee developed in the 1890s as a stagecoach stop on the Raymond–Wawona road. In April 1892, Albert Henry Washburn, operator of the Yosemite Stage Line, purchased 320 acres of ranch land previously owned by Martin and Bessie Cassell to establish a way station along the route. In 1899, Washburn and William M. Sell, Sr. built a two-story inn known as the Ahwahnee Tavern, which served stagecoach travelers bound for Yosemite.

The inn became a midway stop on the one-day stagecoach route between Raymond and Wawona, operated by the Yosemite Stage and Turnpike Company. The name "Ahwahnee" was suggested by Mary Peck Sell, wife of William Sell, and was derived from a Miwok word referring to a “grassy valley.”

On May 7, 1903, President Theodore Roosevelt stopped at the Ahwahnee Tavern for lunch on his way to Yosemite to meet John Muir. Other visitors reported in contemporary accounts included Susan B. Anthony, Andrew Carnegie, John D. Rockefeller, and Crown Prince Albert of Belgium.

Tourist traffic declined after 1907, when the Yosemite Valley Railroad reached El Portal and provided a faster route into the park.

=== Tri-County Tuberculosis Sanatorium at Ahwahnee (1919–1969) ===
The Tri-County Tuberculosis Sanatorium was a public health facility in Ahwahnee that operated from 1919 to 1969. It was jointly funded by Madera, Merced, and Stanislaus counties and served as a regional treatment center for tuberculosis patients.

In 1918, the counties purchased 480 acres near Ahwahnee—320 acres from the Sell family, former owners of the Ahwahnee Tavern, and 160 acres from a neighboring rancher. The site was chosen for its elevation, air quality, and isolation, conditions then believed effective in tuberculosis care. The tavern was converted for use as a kitchen and administrative office, while new cottages and wards were built.

The sanatorium operated as a long-term residential facility emphasizing rest, diet, and fresh air. By the 1930s it housed more than 100 patients. Its campus grew to include hospital wards, dormitories, a dairy, farm, and occupational therapy buildings. Architect Julia Morgan is sometimes credited with designing some of the buildings, although this attribution remains unconfirmed.

A fire in 1937 destroyed the original tavern building. Modern medical equipment and a school were added in the 1950s. Stanislaus County withdrew from the partnership in 1954 after opening its own facility in Modesto.

A decline in tuberculosis cases during the 1960s reduced the need for long-term residential care, and the Ahwahnee sanatorium closed in 1969.

=== Harlow Fire ===
A massive wildfire in 1961, called the Harlow Fire, destroyed 50 of Ahwahnee's 60 buildings. While the community as a whole recovered, two Ahwahnee residents were killed in the fire when their car became stuck on an unpaved road as they fled.

=== Ahwahnee Hills Regional Park ===
After the closure of the Tri-County Tuberculosis Sanatorium in 1969, the site was repurposed by a private nonprofit as the Ahwahnee Hills School for Boys. The boarding school operated from 1970 to 1985, serving at-risk youth in a residential vocational education program that utilized the former sanatorium campus.

Following the school’s closure, the land reverted to Madera County ownership. In the 1990s, local volunteers formed the nonprofit group Friends of Ahwahnee Hills Regional Park with the goal of restoring the site and converting it into a public preserve. The resulting Ahwahnee Hills Regional Park opened in 2014. The 241-acre park features hiking trails, interpretive signage, and remnants of the former hospital campus, including stone foundations and preserved building sites.

== Demographics ==
Historical population
Census	Pop.	Note	%±
2010	2,246		—
2020	2,296		2.2%
U.S. Decennial Census; 1860–1870 1880-1890; 1900 1910 1920; 1930 1940 1950; 1960 1970 1980; 1990 2000 2010; 2020

Ahwahnee first appeared as a census designated place in the 2010 U.S. census.

=== 2020 census ===
As of the 2020 census, Ahwahnee had a population of 2,296 and a population density of 198.9 inhabitants per square mile (76.8/km^{2}). The census reported that 99.5% of the population lived in households and 0.5% lived in non-institutionalized group quarters. 0.0% of residents lived in urban areas, while 100.0% lived in rural areas.

There were 902 households, out of which 25.3% included children under the age of 18, 58.1% were married-couple households, 6.5% were cohabiting couple households, 20.3% had a female householder with no spouse or partner present, and 15.1% had a male householder with no spouse or partner present. 21.6% of households were one person, and 15.1% were one person aged 65 or older. The average household size was 2.53. There were 658 families (72.9% of all households).

The age distribution was 20.3% under the age of 18, 4.7% aged 18 to 24, 17.2% aged 25 to 44, 26.2% aged 45 to 64, and 31.6% who were 65 years of age or older. The median age was 51.7 years. For every 100 females, there were 94.1 males, and for every 100 females age 18 and over there were 93.1 males age 18 and over.

There were 1,000 housing units at an average density of 86.6 units per square mile (33.4 units/km^{2}), of which 902 (90.2%) were occupied. Of these, 80.3% were owner-occupied, and 19.7% were occupied by renters. 9.8% of housing units were vacant; the homeowner vacancy rate was 0.5% and the rental vacancy rate was 4.1%.

Racial composition as of the 2020 census
Race	Number	Percent
White	1,892	82.4%
Black or African American	9	0.4%
American Indian and Alaska Native	38	1.7%
Asian	23	1.0%
Native Hawaiian and Other Pacific Islander	3	0.1%
Some other race	83	3.6%
Two or more races	248	10.8%
Hispanic or Latino (of any race)	262	11.4%
