= Oakhurst, California =

Oakhurst
- Census-designated place
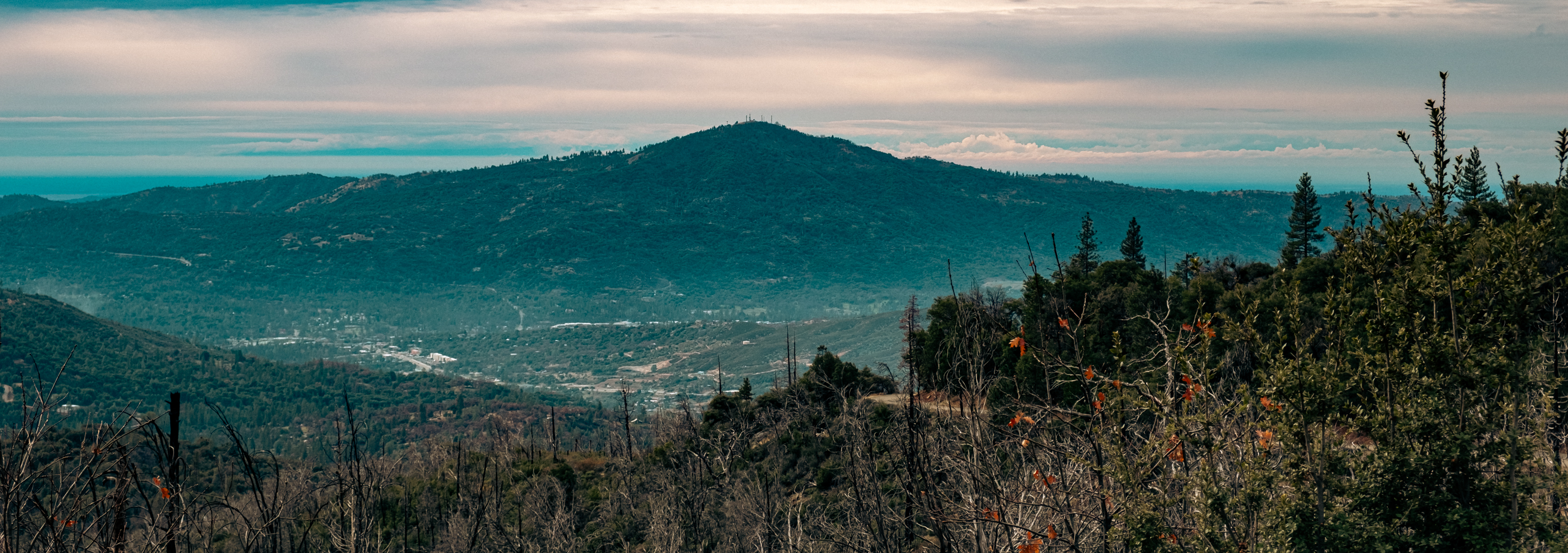
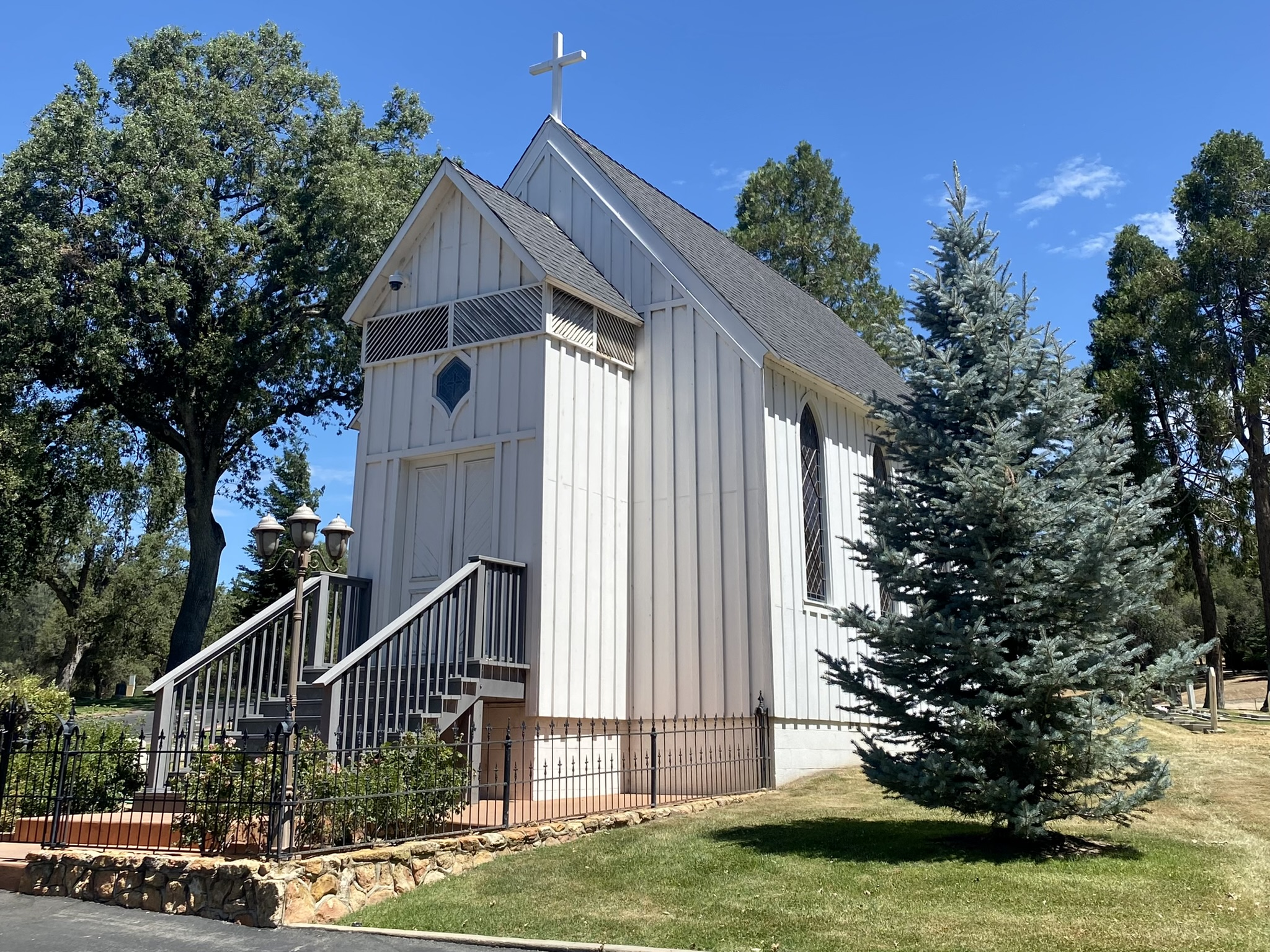
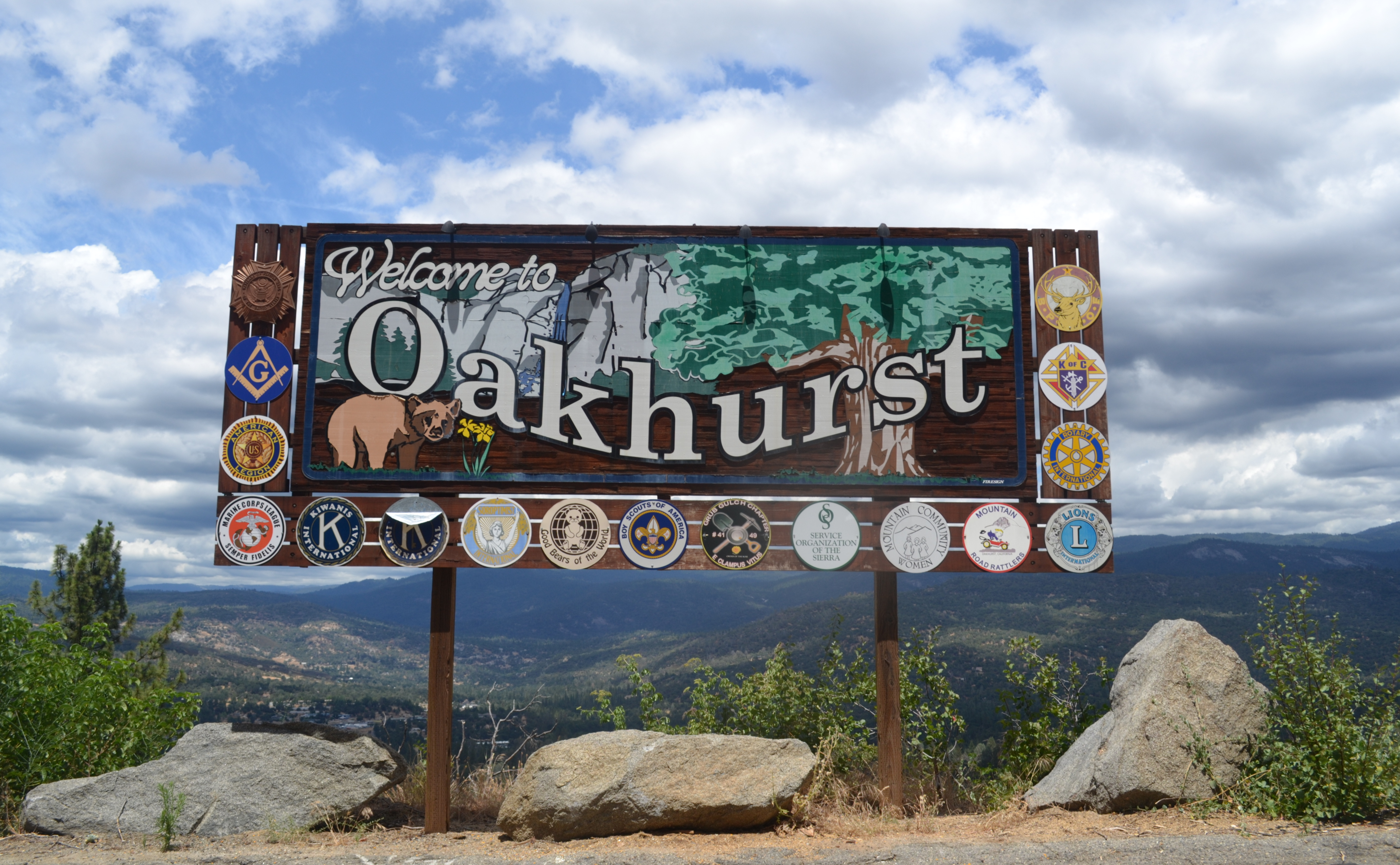
- Oakhurst seen from the Sierra Vista Scenic Byway Oakhill Cemetery State Route 41 welcome sign

- Location in Madera County and the state of California

- Location in the United States
- Coordinates: 37°19′41″N 119°38′58″W
- Country: United States
- State: California
- County: Madera

Area
  - Total: 33.46 sq mi (86.7 km^{2})
  - Land: 33.45 sq mi (86.6 km^{2})
  - Water: 0.01 sq mi (0.026 km^{2}) 0.02%
- Elevation: 2,274 ft (693 m)

Population (2020)
  - Total: 5,945
  - Density: 177.7/sq mi (68.6/km^{2})
- Time zone: UTC-8 (Pacific (PST))
  - Summer (DST): UTC-7 (PDT)
- ZIP code: 93644
- Area code: 559
- FIPS code: 06-52764
- GNIS feature ID: 277565

Oakhurst (formerly Fresno Flats) is a census-designated place (CDP) in Madera County, California, United States. It lies in the Sierra Nevada foothills about 14 miles (23 km) south of the southern entrance to Yosemite National Park, at the junction of Highway 41 and Highway 49. Oakhurst is at the southern edge of California’s Gold Country and had a population of 5,945 at the 2020 United States census.

Founded in 1858 as Fresno Flats, the community developed first as a cattle stop and later as a logging center before becoming a gateway for Yosemite-bound travel. The surrounding region had long been a gathering place for the Miwok, Yokuts, and Mono peoples and was the site of early conflicts after California statehood, including the opening battle of the Mariposa War. In the late 20th century, Oakhurst gained attention in the computer game industry as the headquarters of Sierra On-Line, publisher of influential graphic adventure titles and creator of one of the first online gaming networks.

== Geography ==
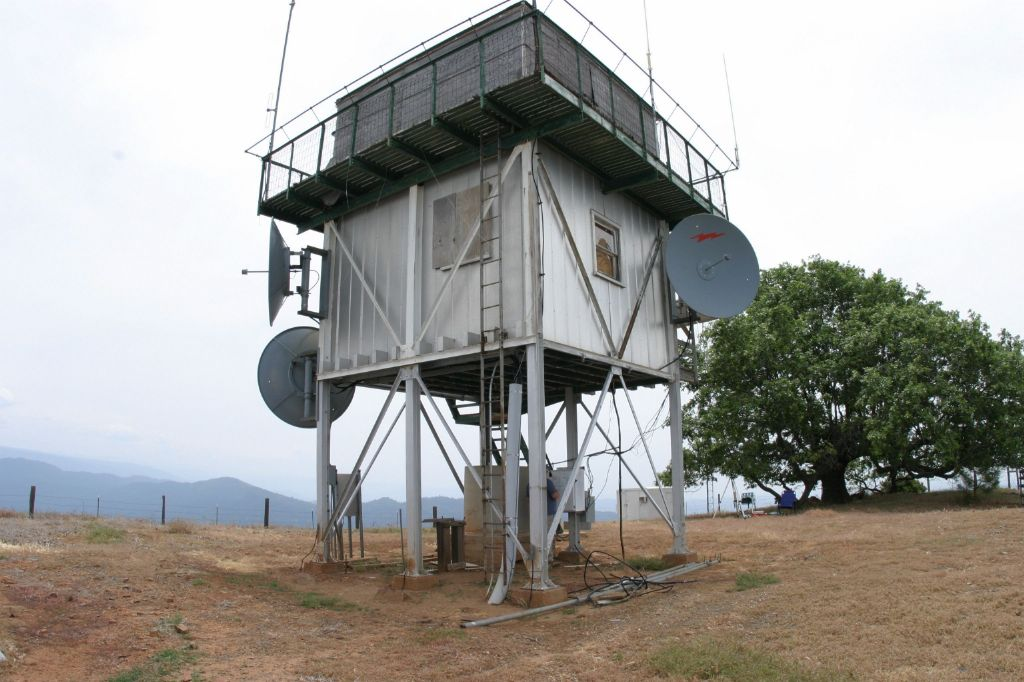
Deadwood Peak

Oakhurst lies along the Fresno River, 3 miles (5 km) south-southwest of Yosemite Forks, at an elevation of 2,274 feet (693 m).

The community is in the upper foothills of the Sierra Nevada. The Fresno River borders parts of Oakhurst to the west and north. Roads from Oakhurst extend south toward the San Joaquin Valley, north toward Yosemite National Park and east along California State Route 49.

Nearby communities include Ahwahnee, Coarsegold, and Bass Lake. According to the United States Census Bureau, the CDP covers 33.5 square miles (87 km^{2}), of which 0.01 square miles (0.026 km^{2}) is water.

Deadwood Peak rises south of Oakhurst and was formerly the site of Deadwood Peak Lookout.

== History ==
=== Native people ===
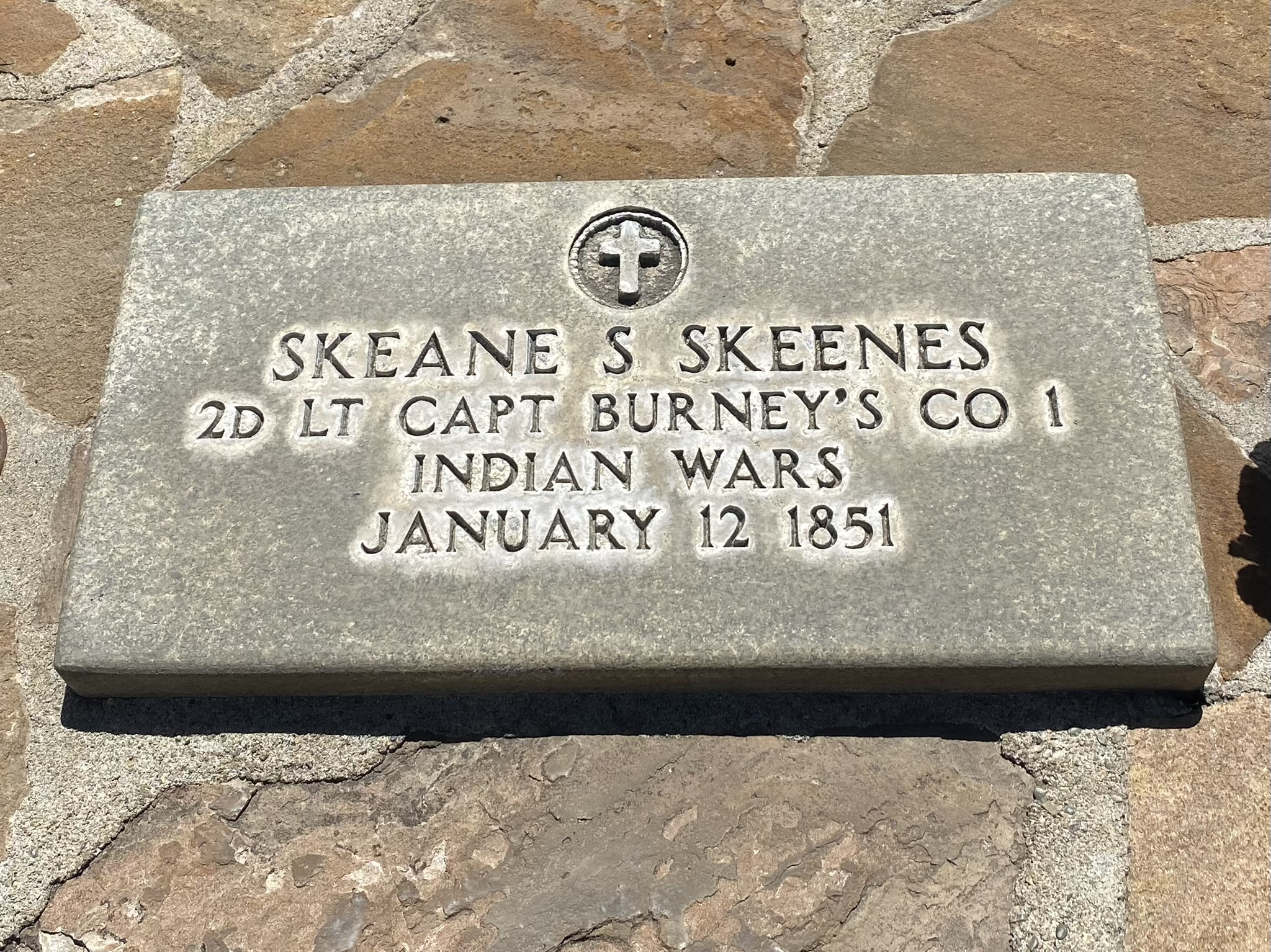
Skeane S. Skeenes, first militia casualty of the Mariposa War, buried at Oakhill Cemetery, Oakhurst

Oakhurst was a common meeting ground for the Miwoks, Yokuts, and Monos before the time of the California Gold Rush.

Many Native Californians were displaced by white settlers following the enactment of the Act for the Government and Protection of Indians in 1850. This act facilitated the removal and displacement of Native Californian Indians from their traditional lands, and led to the Mariposa War, the first battle of which was fought near present-day Oakhurst on January 11, 1851. By June 1851, most Native Americans in the region had been relocated to the Fresno River Farm Reservation, opening the region to the first permanent white settlers.

=== Fresno Flats ===
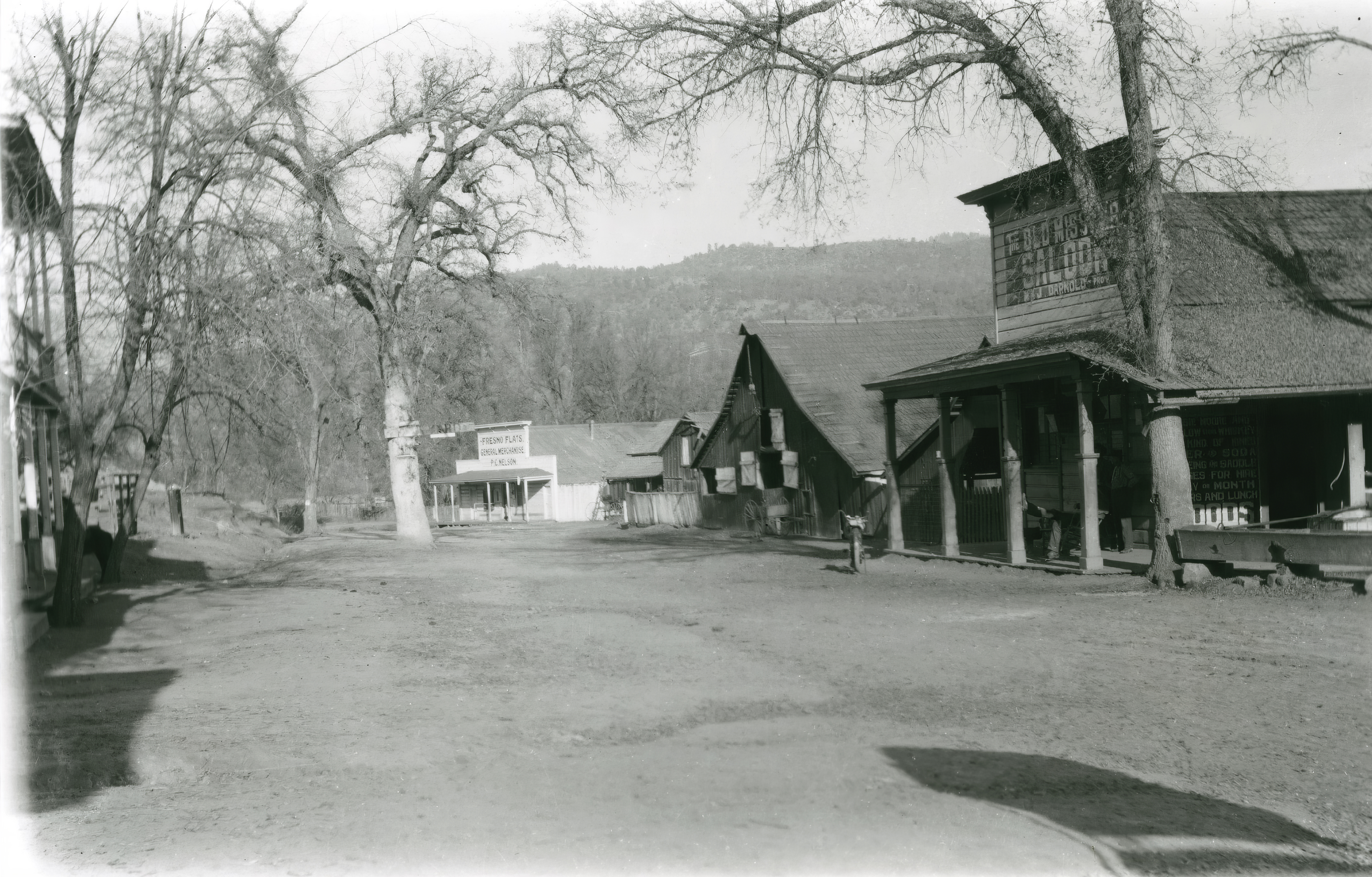
Fresno Flats, circa 1900.

Oakhurst originated in 1858 as Fresno Flats, named for the Spanish word fresno (ash tree) and the flat meadowlands in the area.

Unlike many nearby towns along what is now the Golden Chain Highway, Fresno Flats was not founded as a mining camp. The first recorded settler was rancher John Robert Nichols, who arrived in 1858. Other families followed, raising livestock and planting orchards.

After the California Gold Rush, the first Chinese family settled near a creek feeding into the Fresno River. As more Chinese residents arrived, the waterway became known as China Creek, a name that endures.

A post office was established in 1873. The following year, the Madera Flume and Lumber Company began constructing a log flume along the Fresno River, launching the local timber industry. By 1876, a wagon road from Madera to Yosemite was completed, and Fresno Flats became an important stop on the route to Wawona. By 1884, the town supported hotels, stores, a blacksmith, skating rink, dance hall, schoolhouse, and several saloons.

The first school, a log structure built in 1871, recorded an average attendance of about 27 students with a single teacher by 1884.

=== Name change ===
Fresno Flats lost its name in 1912 after a resident secretly petitioned the town be renamed over fear that the town's reputation was forever tarnished because of a local stagecoach robbery. The town was renamed Oakhurst by an Act of Congress that took most people in town by surprise.

=== Highway era ===
Oakhurst declined in the early 20th century following the collapse of the local mining industry, the end of stagecoach travel to Yosemite, and the 1931 closure of the Madera Sugar Pine Company. The opening of the All-Year Highway in 1926 redirected Yosemite-bound automobile traffic through Merced, reducing visitor numbers and economic activity in Oakhurst. In the 1930s, construction of the Fresno–Yosemite road, now California State Route 41, restored a direct connection from Fresno to Yosemite Valley, shortening the trip by about 35 miles.

Today, more than 1.2 million visitors a year enter Yosemite through the park’s south gate, with most passing through Oakhurst on Highway 41. Tourism remains the town’s primary economic driver, with activity concentrated in the summer months. At that time, hotel occupancy is highest and local employment expands in lodging, dining, retail, and transportation. In 2017, accommodation and food service sales in Oakhurst totaled $36.5 million.

=== Sierra On-Line ===
The pioneering computer game developer Sierra On-Line was based in Oakhurst from 1981 to 1999. The company achieved many industry firsts, including the development of the first 3D adventure game (King's Quest, 1984) and one of the first online gaming networks (The Sierra Network, 1989).

== Demographics ==
Historical population
Census	Pop.	Note	%±
2000	2,868		—
2010	2,829		−1.4%
2020	5,945		110.1%
U.S. Decennial Census; 1860–1870 1880-1890; 1900 1910 1920; 1930 1940 1950; 1960 1970 1980; 1990 2000 2010

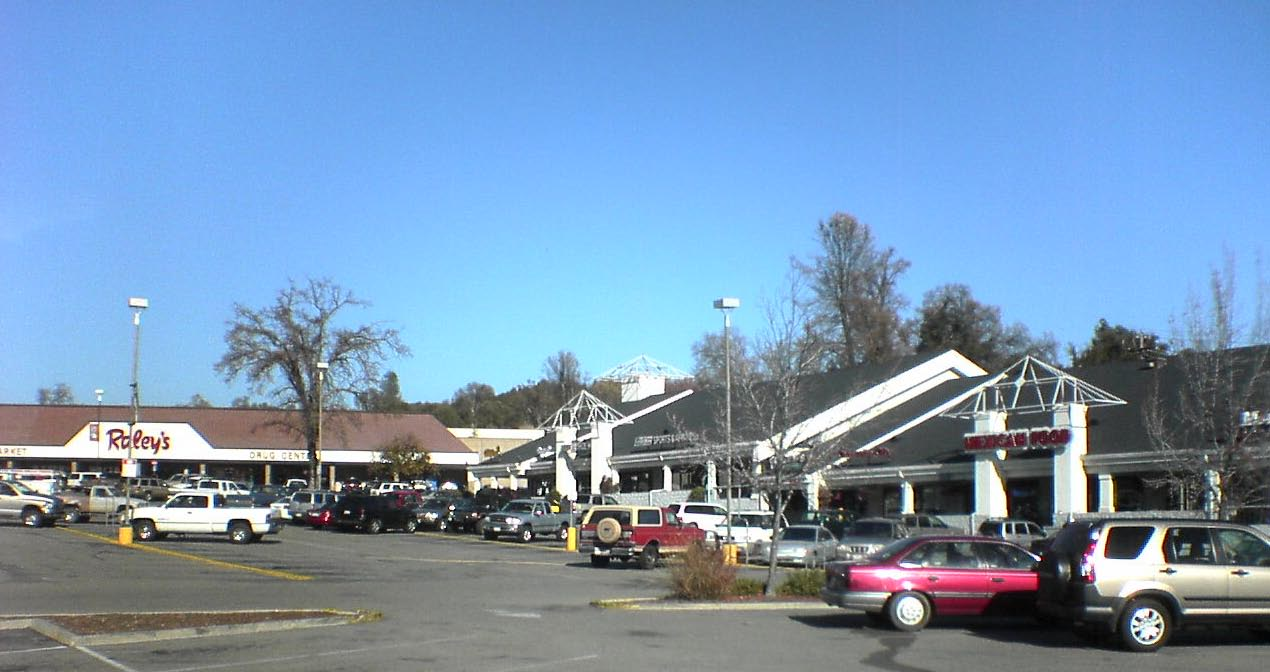
Raley's shopping center in Oakhurst

=== 2020 census ===
As of the 2020 census, Oakhurst had a population of 5,945. The median age was 52.7 years. 17.1% of residents were under the age of 18 and 30.5% of residents were 65 years of age or older. For every 100 females there were 96.7 males, and for every 100 females age 18 and over there were 94.6 males age 18 and over.

0.0% of residents lived in urban areas, while 100.0% lived in rural areas.

There were 2,548 households in Oakhurst, of which 22.0% had children under the age of 18 living in them. Of all households, 47.7% were married-couple households, 18.5% were households with a male householder and no spouse or partner present, and 27.5% were households with a female householder and no spouse or partner present. About 29.6% of all households were made up of individuals and 17.9% had someone living alone who was 65 years of age or older.

There were 3,134 housing units, of which 18.7% were vacant. The homeowner vacancy rate was 3.6% and the rental vacancy rate was 6.5%.

Racial composition as of the 2020 census
Race	Number	Percent
White	4,690	78.9%
Black or African American	14	0.2%
American Indian and Alaska Native	186	3.1%
Asian	114	1.9%
Native Hawaiian and Other Pacific Islander	8	0.1%
Some other race	298	5.0%
Two or more races	635	10.7%
Hispanic or Latino (of any race)	845	14.2%

=== Demographic estimates ===
Among residents, 3.1% were under age 5. Women accounted for 56.5% of the population. Veterans made up 357 residents, and 5.7% of the population was foreign-born.

About 10.5% of residents spoke a language other than English at home. Among residents age 25 and older, 91.3% had a high school diploma and 29.4% held a bachelor's degree or higher. Computer ownership was reported in 92.4% of households, and 85.9% had a broadband internet subscription.

=== Households and housing ===
Housing consisted of 1,742 owner-occupied units (79.9%) and 441 renter-occupied units (20.1%). The median value of owner-occupied housing was $369,900; median monthly owner costs were $2,189 with a mortgage and $637 without a mortgage. Median gross rent was $1,303. Households averaged 2.29 persons.

=== Income and poverty ===
The median household income was $73,333, per capita income was $44,763, and 16.2% of residents lived below the poverty line.

=== 2010 census ===
Oakhurst had a population of 2,829 in 2010.

=== 2000 census ===
Oakhurst had a population of 2,868 in 2000.

=== Housing and short-term rentals ===
Local reporting has noted that the growth of short-term rental platforms such as Airbnb has reduced the availability of long-term rentals, contributing to increased rents and housing competition.

== Government and politics ==
In the California State Legislature, Oakhurst is in the 4th senatorial district, represented by Republican Marie Alvarado-Gil and the 8th Assembly district, represented by Republican David Tangipa. In the United States House of Representatives, it is in California's 5th congressional district, represented by Republican Tom McClintock.

On February 5, 2008, voters considered Measure C, which would have incorporated Oakhurst as a municipality. The measure failed, with 56% voting against incorporation and 44% in favor.

Because Oakhurst remains unincorporated, it has no municipal mayor. The community has instead held an honorary mayor campaign in which candidates raise money for local nonprofit organizations, with each dollar raised counting as one vote and the leading fundraiser receiving the title.

== Education ==
Oakhurst is home to Yosemite High School and the headquarters of the Yosemite Unified School District, which serves eastern Madera County.

The Oakhurst Community College Center, part of the State Center Community College District, offers associate degrees and transfer programs. Established in the 1980s, the campus is located on Road 426 near the Madera County Library branch. In October 2024, construction began on a new 30-acre campus along Highway 49.

== Culture and attractions ==
=== Local landmarks and historic sites ===
The Talking Bear, a fiberglass grizzly bear statue at the intersection of State Route 41 and Road 426, was installed in 1965. Built by Fiberglass Menagerie Co. of Alpine for local businessman Hugh Schollenbarger, the statue plays a recorded message about the California grizzly bear when a button is pressed. Wood-carved bears later became a common feature around Oakhurst, and in 2026 the Madera County Board of Supervisors designated the community the "Carved Bear Capital of the World".

The Little Church on the Hill was built in 1894 and moved from Chapel Hill to Oakhill Cemetery in 1957. Constructed from locally milled sugar pine, it was the first church in Fresno Flats and served several denominations for more than 50 years. The church and cemetery were designated a California Point of Historical Interest in 1994.

Fresno Flats Historical Village and Park preserves several 19th-century buildings from the surrounding area, including the 1869 Taylor Log House, the Laramore–Layman House of the 1870s, the 1890 Raymond Jail, and several one-room schoolhouses.

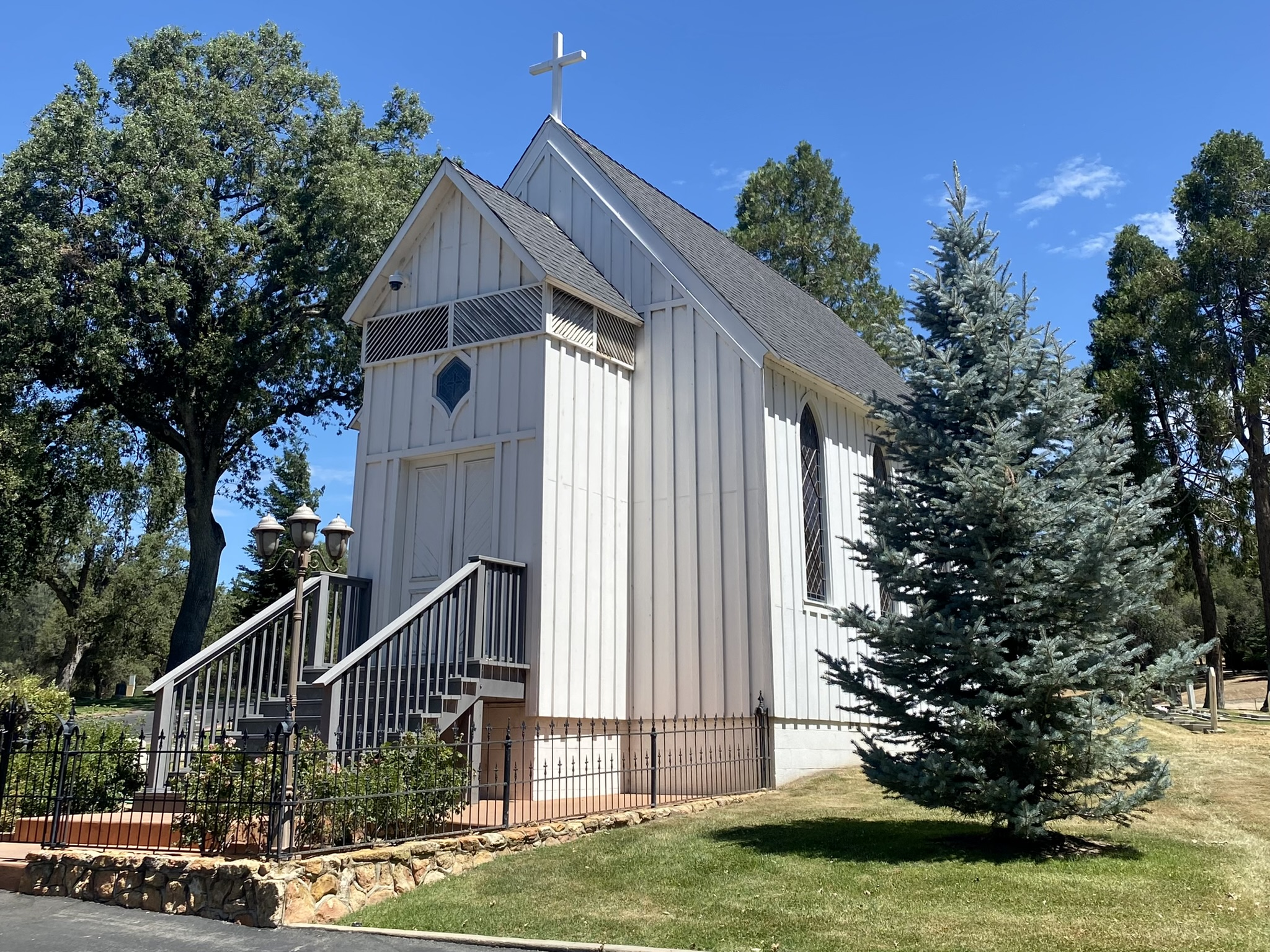
The Little Church on the Hill at Oakhill Cemetery

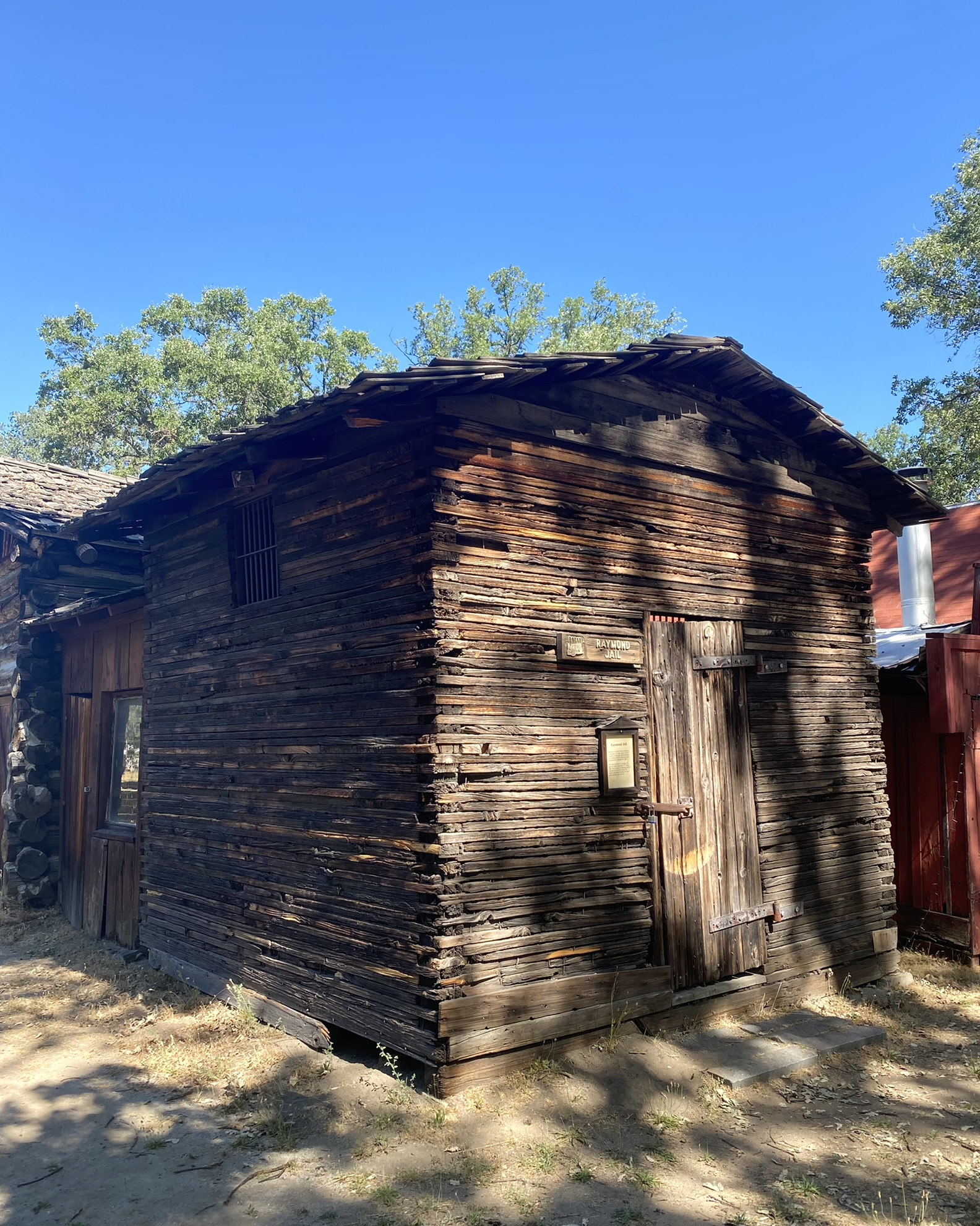
The 1890 Raymond Jail, relocated to Fresno Flats Historical Village from Raymond

=== Sierra Mountaineer Days ===
Sierra Mountaineer Days was first held in 1964 and developed into a multi-day festival that at its height attracted more than 10,000 visitors. The festival included a parade, rodeo, barbecue, and beauty pageant, with events drawing on the area's mining and logging history. It was revived in the late 1990s as Mountain Heritage Day, held at Fresno Flats Historical Village with a parade and living-history activities.

== Infrastructure ==
=== Transportation ===
Highway 41 connects Oakhurst to Fresno and Yosemite. Highway 49 has its southern terminus at Highway 41 in Oakhurst and connects to Mariposa.

Oakhurst is served by the YARTS Highway 41 bus route between Fresno and Yosemite, and by the Madera County Connection bus system, which travels to Madera and Bass Lake.

=== Utilities ===
Cable television services for the town of Oakhurst are contracted to Vyve Broadband.

Sierra Telephone Company, which serves northern Madera County and much of adjoining Mariposa County, is based in Oakhurst.

== Notable people ==
- Bill Davis, creative director
- From Indian Lakes, indie rock band
- Peter Ledger, artist
- Ted Lilly, MLB pitcher; attended Yosemite High School in Oakhurst
- Lori Martin, actress
