= Yosemite Forks, California =

Unincorporated community in California, United States

Yosemite Forks
- Unincorporated community
- Location in California Yosemite Forks (the United States)
- Coordinates: 37°22′02″N 119°37′55″W
- Country: United States
- State: California
- County: Madera
- Elevation: 2,907 ft (886 m)

Yosemite Forks is an unincorporated community in Madera County, California, United States. It is located 18 miles (29 km) northeast of Raymond, at an elevation of 2,907 feet (886 m). The road forks at the place: one continues to Yosemite Valley, the other to Bass Lake.
