= Rolling Hills =

Rolling hills is a terrain of undulating gently sloped low hills.

Rolling Hills may also refer to:

Canada

- Rolling Hills, Alberta

United States

- Rolling Hills, California, in Los Angeles County
- Rolling Hills, Madera County, California
- Rolling Hills, Kentucky
- Rolling Hills, Wyoming
- Rolling Hills Elementary School (Lancaster, Texas)
- Rolling Hills Estates, California
- Rolling Hills Zoo, Kansas
- Rolling Hills Memorial Park
- Rolling Hills Christian Church
- Rolling Hills Wind Farm
