= Madera Ranchos, California =

Unincorporated community in California, United States

Madera Ranchos
- Unincorporated community Census-designated place
- Location within California Location within the United States
- Coordinates: 36°55′52″N 119°52′54″W
- Country: United States
- State: California
- County: Madera

Area
  - Total: 2.61 sq mi (6.8 km^{2})
  - Land: 2.61 sq mi (6.8 km^{2})
  - Water: 0 sq mi (0 km^{2})
- Elevation: 341 ft (104 m)

Population (2020)
  - Total: 3,623
  - Density: 1,390/sq mi (536/km^{2})
- Time zone: UTC-8 (Pacific (PST))
  - Summer (DST): UTC-7 (PDT)
- ZIP code: 93636 (Madera)
- Area code: 559
- FIPS code: 06-45054
- GNIS feature ID: 1812803

Madera Ranchos is an unincorporated community and census-designated place (CDP) in Madera County, California, United States. It lies at an elevation of 341 feet (104 m). As of the 2020 census it had a population of 3,623. For statistical purposes, the United States Census Bureau has defined Madera Ranchos as a census-designated place (CDP).

== Demographics ==
Historical population
Census	Pop.	Note	%±
2020	3,623		—
U.S. Decennial Census; 1850–1870 1880-1890; 1900 1910 1920; 1930 1940 1950; 1960 1970 1980; 1990 2000 2010; 2020

Madera Ranchos first appeared as a census designated place in the 2020 U.S. census after the Bonadelle Ranchos-Madera Ranchos CDP was split into the Bonadelle Ranchos CDP and the Madera Ranchos CDP.

=== 2020 census ===
As of the 2020 census, Madera Ranchos had a population of 3,623. The median age was 42.5 years. 22.2% of residents were under the age of 18 and 21.8% of residents were 65 years of age or older. For every 100 females there were 98.7 males, and for every 100 females age 18 and over there were 96.7 males age 18 and over.

0.0% of residents lived in urban areas, while 100.0% lived in rural areas.

There were 1,207 households in Madera Ranchos, of which 35.8% had children under the age of 18 living in them. Of all households, 66.9% were married-couple households, 11.8% were households with a male householder and no spouse or partner present, and 16.8% were households with a female householder and no spouse or partner present. About 15.3% of all households were made up of individuals and 9.0% had someone living alone who was 65 years of age or older.

There were 1,246 housing units, of which 3.1% were vacant. The homeowner vacancy rate was 0.9% and the rental vacancy rate was 2.8%.

Madera Rancho CDP, California – Racial and ethnic composition Note: the US Census treats Hispanic/Latino as an ethnic category. This table excludes Latinos from the racial categories and assigns them to a separate category. Hispanics/Latinos may be of any race.
Race / Ethnicity (NH = Non-Hispanic)	Pop 2020	% 2020
White alone (NH)	2,070	57.13%
Black or African American alone (NH)	29	0.80%
Native American or Alaska Native alone (NH)	16	0.44%
Asian alone (NH)	124	3.42%
Pacific Islander alone (NH)	3	0.08%
Other race alone (NH)	14	0.39%
Mixed race or Multiracial (NH)	171	4.72%
Hispanic or Latino (any race)	1,196	33.01%
Total	3,623	100.00%
