= Sumner Hill, California =

Unincorporated community in California, United States

Sumner Hill
- Unincorporated community
- Location in California Sumner Hill (the United States)
- Coordinates: 36°57′20″N 119°45′01″W
- Country: United States
- State: California
- County: Madera
- Elevation: 535 ft (163 m)

Sumner Hill is an unincorporated community in Madera County, California, United States. Lying at an elevation of 535 feet (163 m), it is 6 1/2 miles north of Woodland Park in Fresno. It was created in 1985 as a 49-lot subdivision on a bluff on the eastern section of Peck Ranch, on the Madera County side of the San Joaquin River. The gated community developed a reputation for its high-priced homes. In the 1990s, the entire 15,000-acre area south of Little Table Mountain and east of Highways 41 and 45, including Sumner Hill, started being called "Rio Mesa".

In a six-year legal battle, the Sumner Hill Homeowners' Association fought to protect the subdivision's exclusive access to the San Joaquin River via Killkelly Road, with a Fresno appellate court affirming in 2012 that the statute of limitations had expired for Rio Mesa developers to claim public access. As of 2012, Sumner Hill remained the only significant residential development in the Rio Mesa area. In a subsequent lawsuit, the Rio Mesa developers won a $25 million judgment against a national title insurance company for failing to defend their access to the river through Sumner Hill.

== Background ==
In 1983, the County of Madera approved the creation of Sumner Hill as a residential subdivision, on the condition that a security gate and perimeter fence were installed. This was to minimize the need for local law enforcement to travel to the community's remote location.

The 670-acre development opened in 1985. The 49 lots ranged in size from 1 1/2 to six acres. Early Sumner Hill residents included members of the Peck family, who were fourth-generation farmers in San Joaquin Valley. Street names within the subdivision were personally selected by Carolyn Peck, owner of Peck Ranch, and included names like Rose of Trailee Place, Killarney Drive, and Bonny-Kerry Lane.

On one side, the bluff overlooks Friant Dam, Lost Lake, the San Joaquin River, and the Sierra foothills. On another side, it offers a view of Madera and Fresno counties toward Clovis and the Fresno skyline. The two-lane road leading to Sumner Hill passes vineyards and pastures, and citrus orchards are also visible in the surrounding area. Wildlife in the area included deer and geese, as well as skunks, raccoons, and coyotes.

By 1992, Sumner Hill was referred to as "Pill Hill" because so many doctors had moved there from Fresno. In 2007, The Fresno Bee described the community as having some of the most elegant homes in the Fresno area. Sumner Hill relies on the San Joaquin River as its main water source.

== Access road to river ==
The final subdivision maps recorded in 1984 and 1985 showed Killkelly Road, a dirt road traversing the tract to provide homeowners with unrestricted access to the San Joaquin River. In 1993, Madera County vacated its interest in Killkelly Road, deeming it unnecessary for public use, and vacated its interest in all other roads in the Sumner Hill subdivision in 1994. The rights were conveyed to the Sumner Hill Homeowners Association.

== Lawsuits ==
In the mid-1990s, Madera County officials started planning a new city called Rio Mesa, including Sumner Hill, as it sought to convince University of California officials to locate its new campus in the area – ultimately losing out to Merced. Around 2004, the McCaffrey Group and two partners acquired 1,600 acres of the Peck Ranch for a proposed new development of 5,200 homes. Sumner Hill residents filed a lawsuit in 2006, after the developers tried to prevent them from accessing the San Joaquin river bottom by installing gates and hiring security guards, and invited the general public to enter their subdivision.

In 2008, the Madera County Superior Court ruled that Sumner Hill was a "private, gated subdivision" with exclusive access to the river and needed to be maintained as such, precluding new developers from running trails and other access routes through that tract. In 2009, a jury awarded the homeowners $3.2 million in punitive damages. In 2012, the Fresno 5th District Court of Appeal upheld the jury's award for slander of title and other claims, and affirmed the 2008 decision on the basis that the Rio Mesa developers had filed their claim of public access under the Subdivision Map Act well after the statute of limitations had expired.

However, the court also noted that the Constitution of California had protected public access to navigable waters since 1879, ruling in favor of the Rio Mesa developers on this point, but declined to decide what it deemed as "a basic uncertainty in the law of navigability." The case Sumner Hill Homeowners' Association, Inc. v. Rio Mesa Holdings, LLC has also been cited for affirming that "an interest as small (or large) as a simple right-of-way easement can serve as a basis for a slander of title suit.

In 2016, the Rio Mesa developers won a $25 million judgment against Fidelity National Title Insurance for its failure to defend the developers' access to the river through Sumner Hill. Lawyers for the developers claimed that the verdict was a warning to title companies across the country to be more careful, particularly with regard to California insurance law.
