= Fresno River =

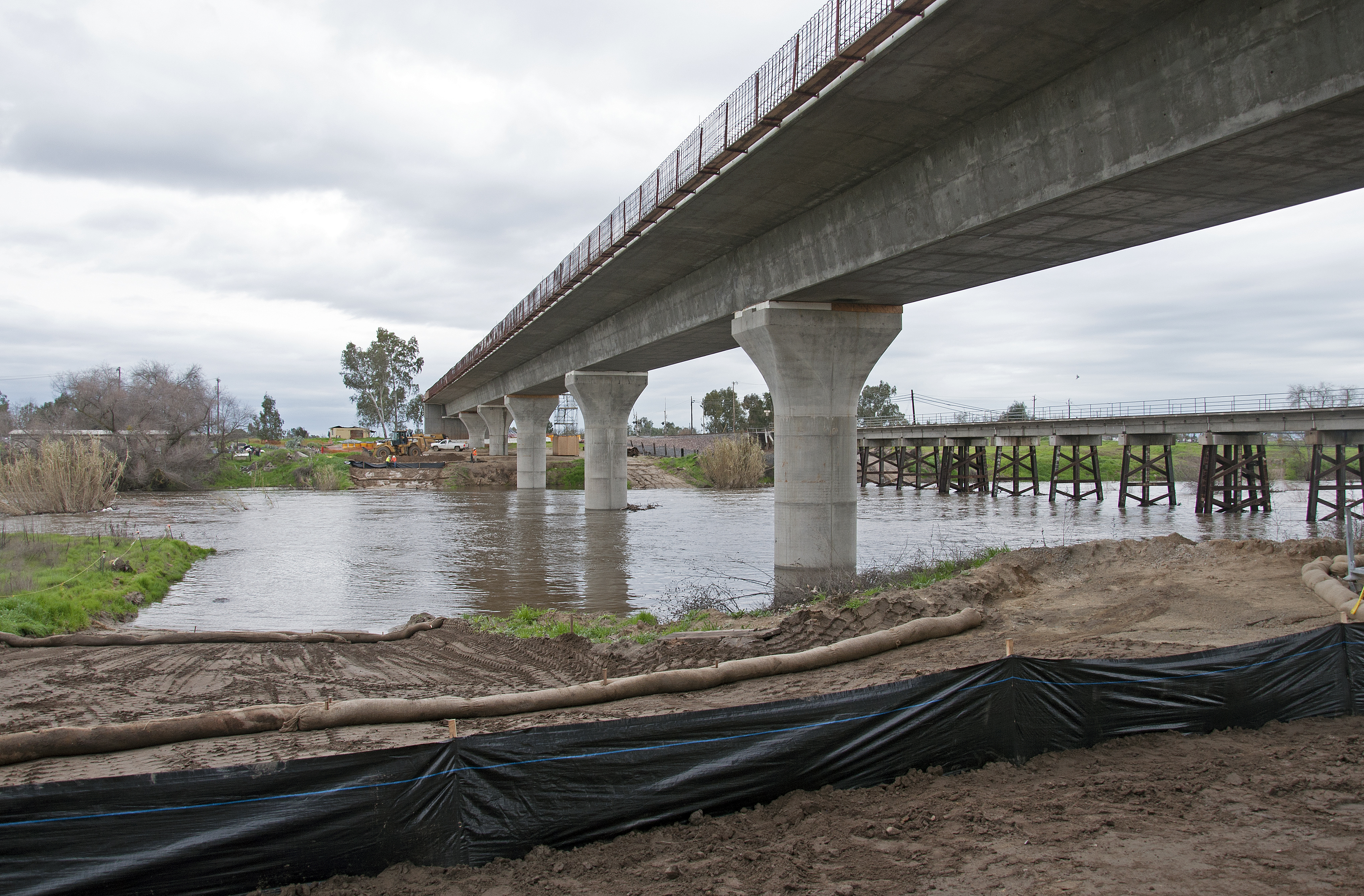
- Fresno River Viaduct, February 2017

Location
- Country: United States
- State: California

Physical characteristics
- Source: Confluence of Lewis Fork Creek, Nelder Creek, and China Creek (Raymond Mountain)
  - location: Oakhurst, Madera County
  - coordinates: 37°21′43″N 119°37′58″W
  - elevation: 2,510 ft (770 m)
- Mouth: San Joaquin River
  - location: Near Dos Palos, Madera County
  - coordinates: 37°04′32″N 120°33′39″W
  - elevation: 108 ft (33 m)
- Length: 83 mi (134 km)
- Discharge
  - location: below Hidden Dam
  - average: 110 cu ft/s (3.1 m^{3}/s)
  - minimum: 0 cu ft/s (0 m^{3}/s)
  - maximum: 17,500 cu ft/s (500 m^{3}/s)

Basin features
- Tributaries
  - left: Nelder Creek, Coarse Gold Creek
  - right: Lewis Fork Fresno River, Peterson Creek

The Fresno River (Spanish for "ash tree") is a river in Central California and a major tributary of the San Joaquin River. It runs approximately 83 miles (134 km) from the Sierra Nevada Range to the San Joaquin River if measured from the source of Rainier Creek, near Raymond Mountain in Yosemite National Park. Although called the 'Fresno' River, it is one of the largest and longest river systems in Madera County.

== Course ==
Headwaters: The Fresno River forms in the Oakhurst valley, near the western border of city limits. The primary source of the Fresno River is Lewis Fork Creek, which gathers water far northeastward into the hills adjacent to Fish Camp. Lewis Fork Creek itself has a major tributary from Nelder Creek, coming from the lower-montane Nelder Grove area and Speckerman Mountain (7,600 ft). The other major tributary is China Creek, which acts as a drainage for the ridges around the Teaford Saddle. After Oakhurst, the Fresno River runs northwest until it reaches the end of the sloped valley at the calm topography of the Fresno Flats. There the valley and hills start to meet, and the Fresno crosses Potter Ridge at around 2,000 feet.

Foothills: As the river carves its way through the ridge, it creates several windy canyons and gulches. This area was mildly popular during the Central Sierra era of the Gold Rush, throughout the early to mid-1850s. Past the ridge, the Fresno River descends the foothills mildly. The harsh canyons ease up and start to widen. It crosses Road 415 at around 1,000 feet elevation, an intersection known as the Fresno Crossing.

Hensley Lake: Once the Fresno River gets out of the foothills, it creates a gently sloped river valley down to the border of the Central Valley. At one of the widest sections of the river, Hidden Dam was constructed and Hensley Lake created. Now a popular recreation spot, the lake covers a considerable area when full from late spring snow melts.

Central Valley: Below the lake, the river flows southwest to Madera, then west to the Eastside Bypass. The river exits the bypass then flows generally northwest to its confluence with the San Joaquin River, just north of Highway 152.

== Lakes and dams ==
Hidden Dam is the only major storage dam on the Fresno River. The dam forms Hensley Lake, a 90,000 acre-foot (110,000,000 m^{3}) reservoir. The United States Army Corps of Engineers built the earth-fill dam, which was completed in 1974. Its primary purpose is flood control, but it is also used to regulate flows for irrigation and groundwater recharge. In 1978, the lake was opened to the public for recreation and is a popular boating and fishing destination for locals.

Below Hidden Dam, the Fresno River provides water to Madera Lake via an unnamed distributary. Excess flow from the lake is returned to the Fresno River by the lake's dam. Further downstream, on the northeast edge of Madera, is the John Franchi Diversion Dam, a 15-foot (4.6 m) high, 263-foot (80 m)-wide earth and steel dam that is used to divert water into the Big Main Canal. The dam was built by the United States Bureau of Reclamation in 1964 and is operated by the Madera Irrigation District. From this point, the river is normally dry. The only time water is released past here is when water levels are high enough to spill over the dam.

== Lower river ==
A diagram of the Fresno River's flow through man-made channels where the original riverbed no longer exists.

West of Road 17 in Madera County, the Fresno River's natural riverbed has been subject to much intervention by man and as a result, the natural riverbed has many gaps in it, which are now connected by man-made canals.

At Road 17, the natural riverbed has been modified to divert most flows into a manmade canal, which leads to the Eastside Bypass. Water can also be allowed to continue flowing down the main river channel (north of the man-made canal), but that water now ends up in the bypass as well.

Once in the bypass, water can exit via a small channel at a diversion dam and continue west along the natural riverbed the rest of the way to the San Joaquin River. Between the Eastside Bypass and the San Joaquin River, the riverbed (which is almost always dry) has been subject to straightening, but more or less follows its natural course.

== Tributaries ==
In addition to many small unnamed streams, the Fresno River receives the water from the following streams:

- Oak Creek, considered by some to be the headwater of the Fresno River beginning at Pierce Lake
- China Creek
- Miami Creek
- Crooks Creek
- Coarsegold Creek
- Spangle Gold Creek
- Willow Creek
- Mud Spring Creek
- China Slough
- South Fork Fresno River
  - This is a distributary that branches off to form a small island, then returns to the mainline Fresno River.
- Berenda Slough

== Towns ==
Towns along the Fresno River include:

- Oakhurst (unincorporated)
- Madera

== Crossings ==
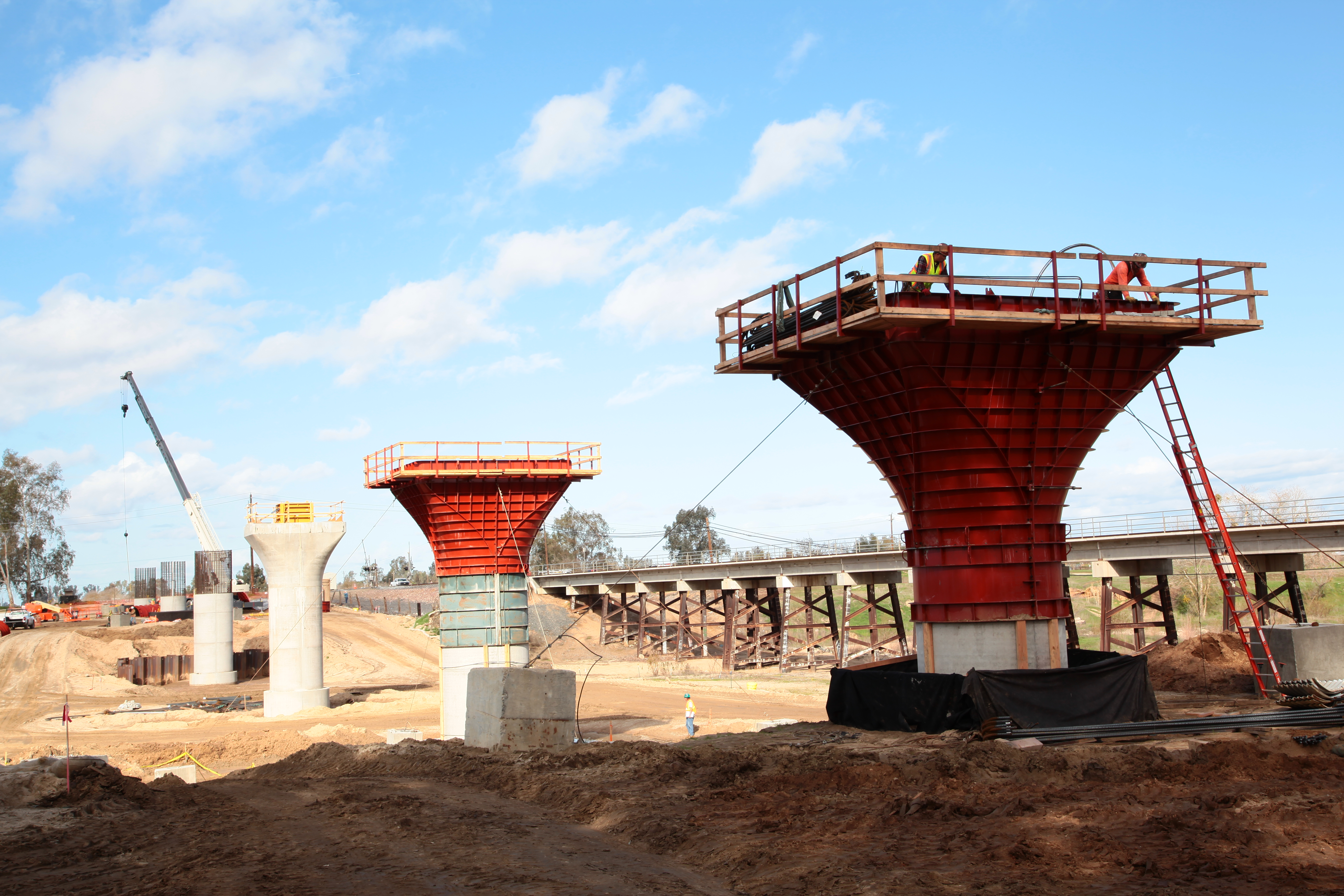
Construction of the Fresno River Viaduct in January 2016. The BNSF Railway bridge is visible in the background.

There are numerous crossings over the Fresno River in Madera and Merced Counties. Crossings are listed here beginning at the source and working downstream:

- Madera County above Hensley Lake
  - Crane Valley Road (Road 426)
  - State Route 41
  - River View Drive
  - Dupfy Fire Road (Road 8084)
  - Ellerbrock Station Road
  - Raymond Road (Road 415)
- Madera County below Hensley Lake
  - Daulton Road (Road 603)
  - California High-Speed Rail Fresno River Viaduct (under construction)
- City of Madera
  - East Cleveland Avenue
  - North Lake Street
  - North D Street
  - North Gateway Drive
  - State Route 99
  - Schnoor Avenue
  - North Granada Drive
- Madera County below the City of Madera
  - Road 23
  - Road 20
  - Road 19
  - Road 16
  - Road 9
  - Road 1
- Merced County
  - State Route 152
