= Hidden Dam =

Hensley Lake & Hidden Dam
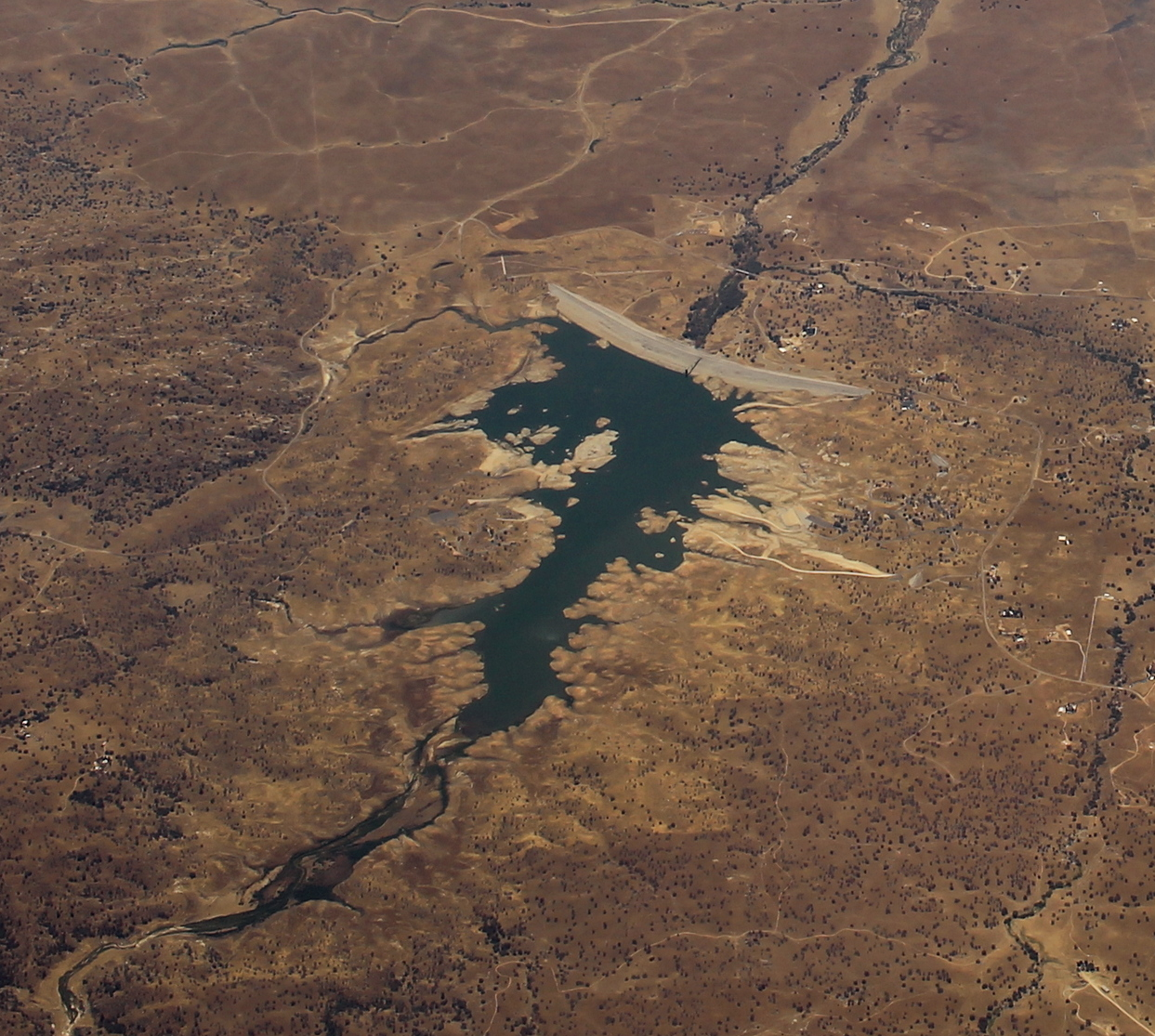
- Aerial view of the lake

- Location within California
- Location: Near Raymond, Madera County, California, United States
- Coordinates: 37.111025°N 119.884330°W
- Lake type: Reservoir
- Primary inflows: Fresno River
- Primary outflows: Fresno River
- Basin countries: United States
- Surface area: 1,500 acres (610 ha)
- Water volume: 90,000 acre⋅ft (0.11 km^{3})
- Shore length^{1}: 20 mi (32 km)
- ^{1} Shore length is not a well-defined measure.

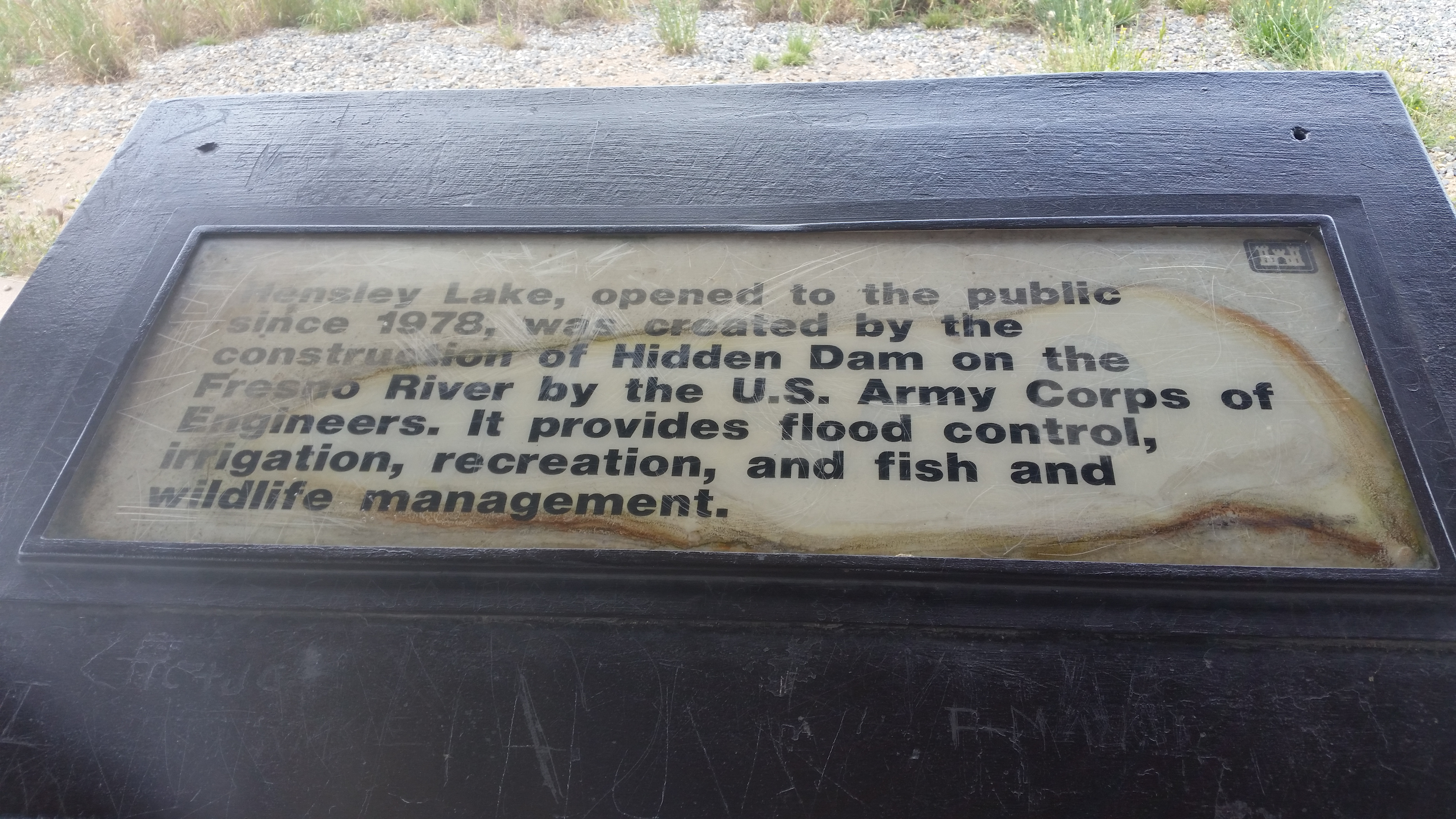
Lake Hensley Vista Point

Hidden Dam is an earthen dam on the Fresno River in Madera County, California. It creates a reservoir known as Hensley Lake.

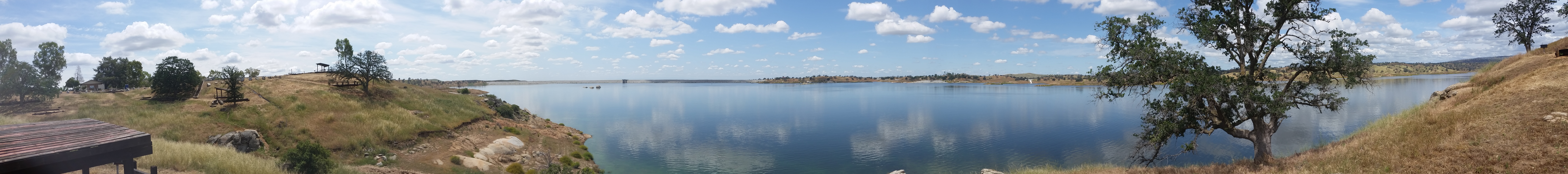

The dam was constructed in 1974 (52 years ago) by the Perini Corporation as part of an expansive United States Army Corps of Engineers project for flood control, irrigation storage, and recreation. The dam is 184 feet (56 m) tall, is 5,730 feet (1,750 m) long at its crest, and is the only major storage dam of the Fresno River.

The reservoir it creates, Hensley Lake, has a water surface of 2.5 square miles (6.5 km^{2}), over 20 miles (32 km) of shoreline, and has a maximum storage capacity of 90,000 acre-feet (110,000,000 m^{3}). In 1978 the lake was opened to day-use recreation, including water skiing, fishing, swimming, horseback riding, mountain biking, and hiking. The Hidden View Campground offers single and group camping year-round.

The lake is named for local settler and cattle rancher John Jackson Hensley.

James D. Savage, who led the Mariposa Battalion during the Mariposa War of 1851, established several trading posts in what is now the Hensley Lake area. He is buried on a hill above the Buck Ridge Day Use Area, where a stone monument marks his grave.

Eastman Lake, another Corps of Engineers lake, is located 15 miles (24 km) to the northwest.

== See also ==
- List of dams and reservoirs in California
- List of lakes in California
