= The Forks Resort =

Resort at Bass Lake, California

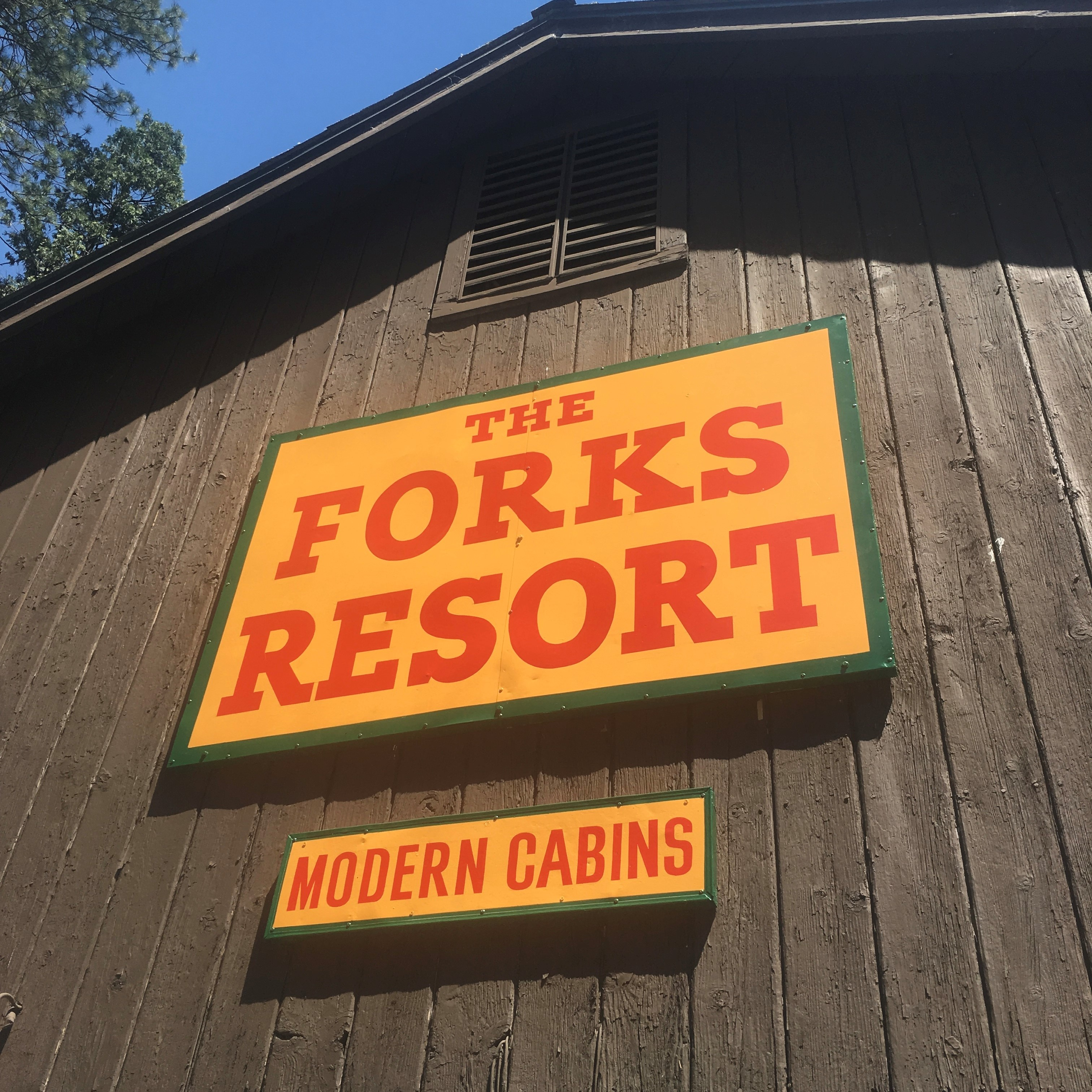
- The Forks Resort

- Location within California Location within the United States

General information
- Location: Bass Lake, California
- Coordinates: 37.3139°N 119.5719°W
- Owner: Ron and Leslie Cox
- Operator: Ron and Leslie Cox

Other information
- Number of restaurants: 1

Website
- theforksresort.com

The Forks Resort is a seasonal resort and restaurant on Bass Lake in Madera County, California. It was built in 1926 or 1927 by Fred Spenhoff. Robert "Bob" Miller purchased it in 1941; the facilities then included four cabins and a general store. After a fire in September 1950, the resort reopened the following year. Ownership later passed to Miller's daughter Pat and her husband Frank Hopkins, and subsequently to Leslie Cox (Bob Miller's granddaughter) and her husband Ron. Helen Rosner wrote about the Forks Resort Restaurant in The New Yorker, listing its burger as among the most memorable foods she had eaten in the 2010s. The feature was reported by SFGATE.

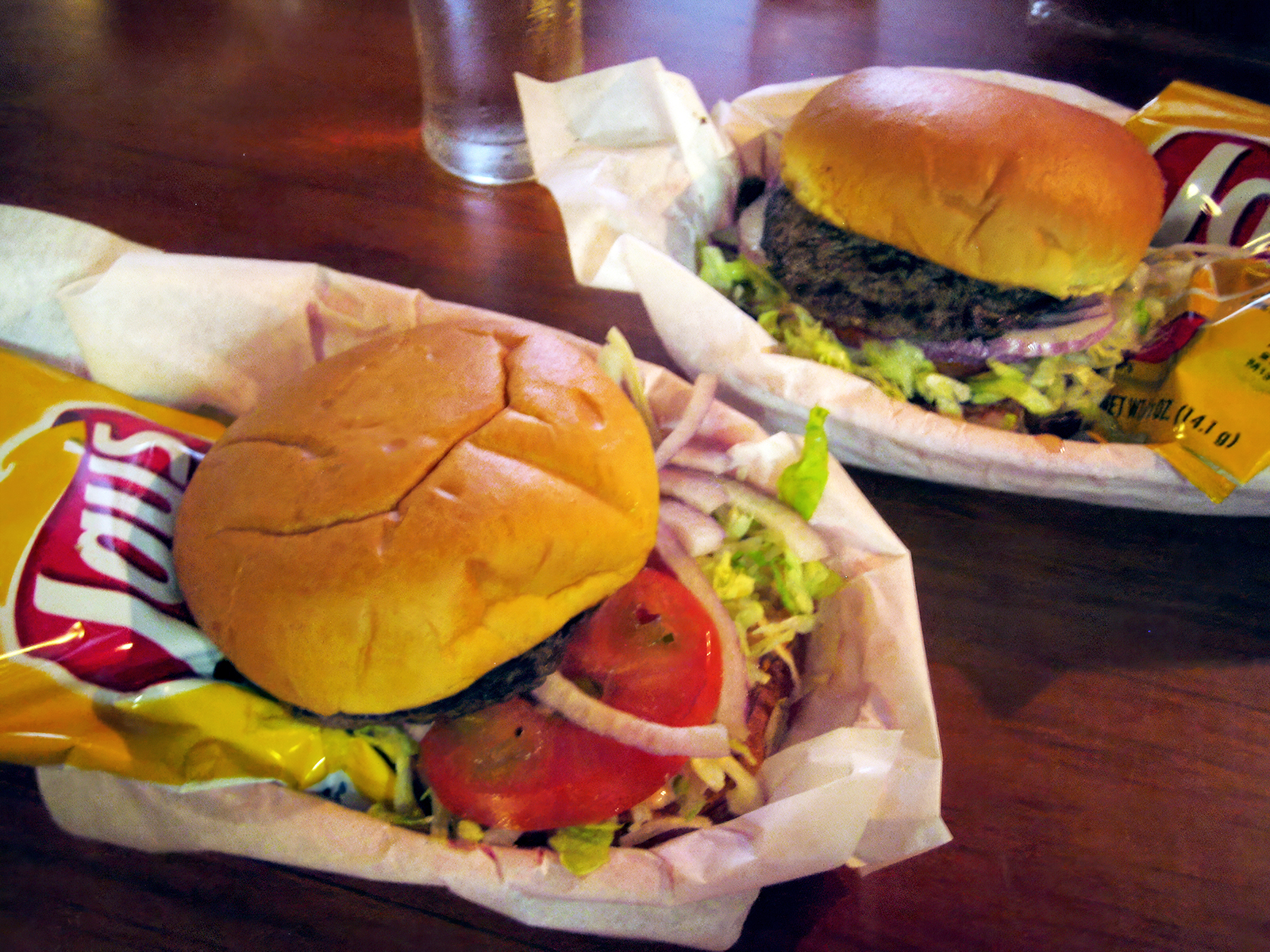
The Forks Burger.
