= Madera County, California =

County in California, United States

Coordinates: 37.22°N 119.77°W

Madera County
- County
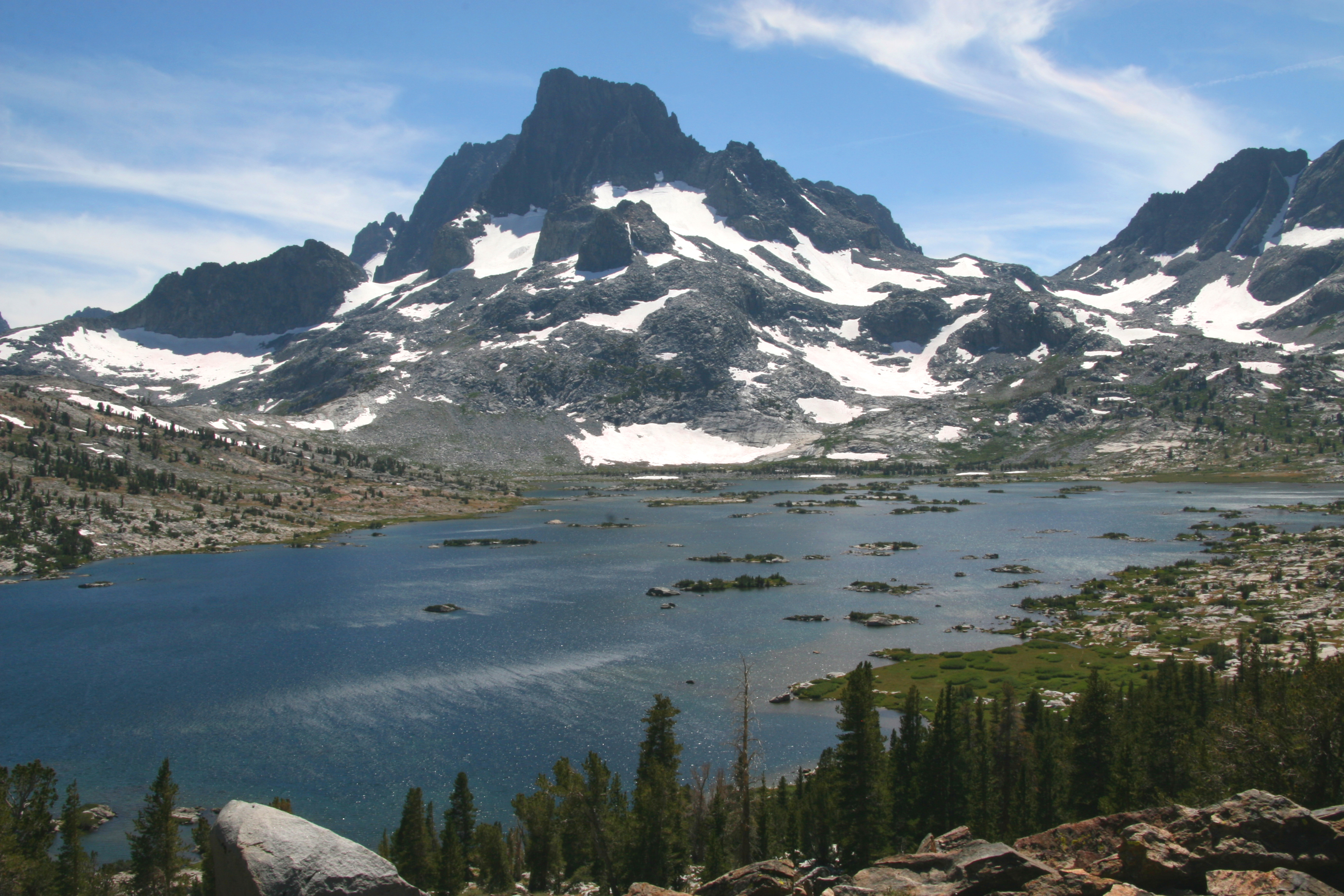
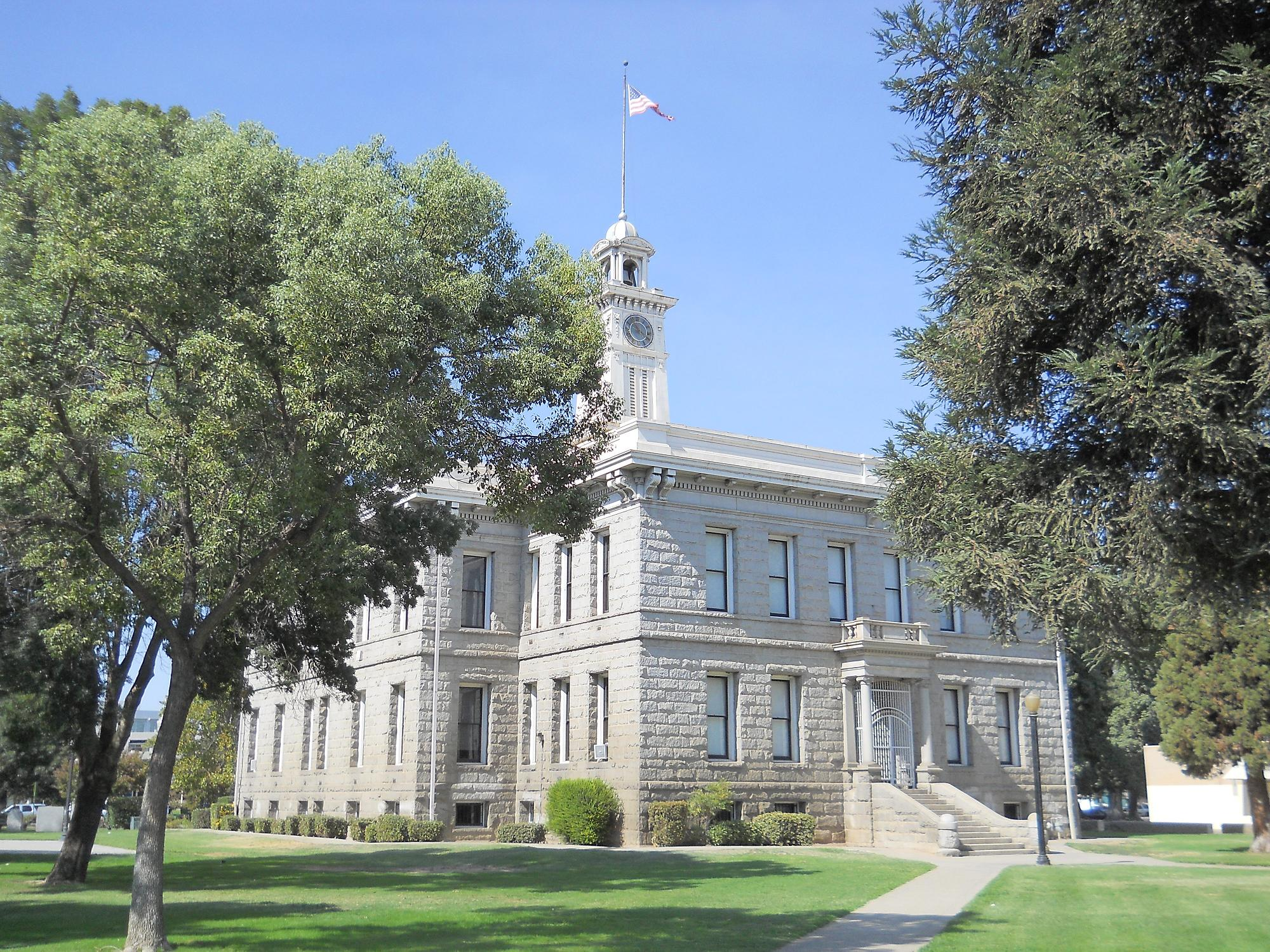
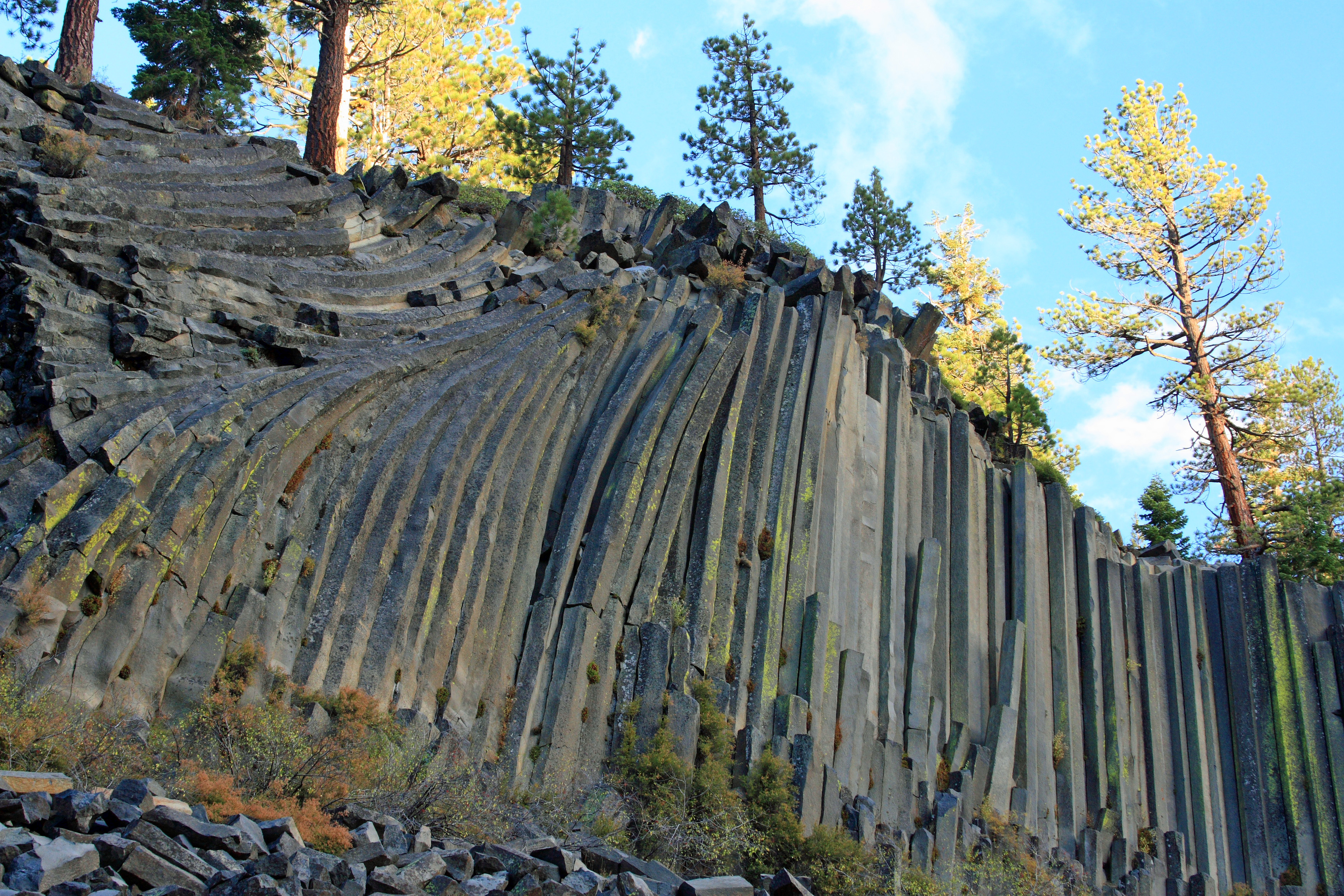
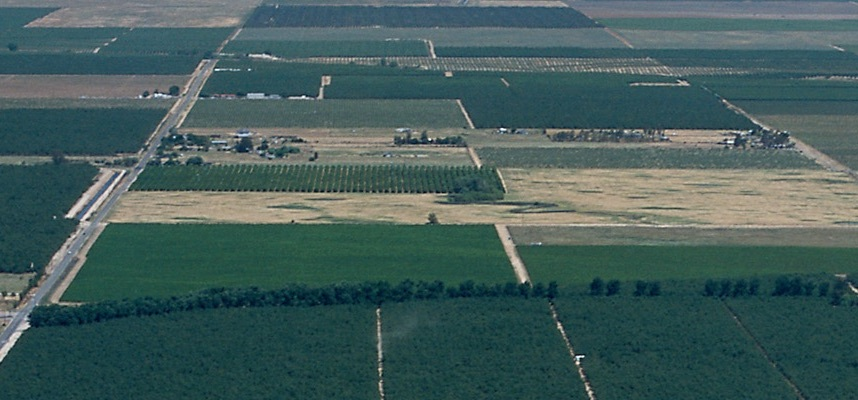
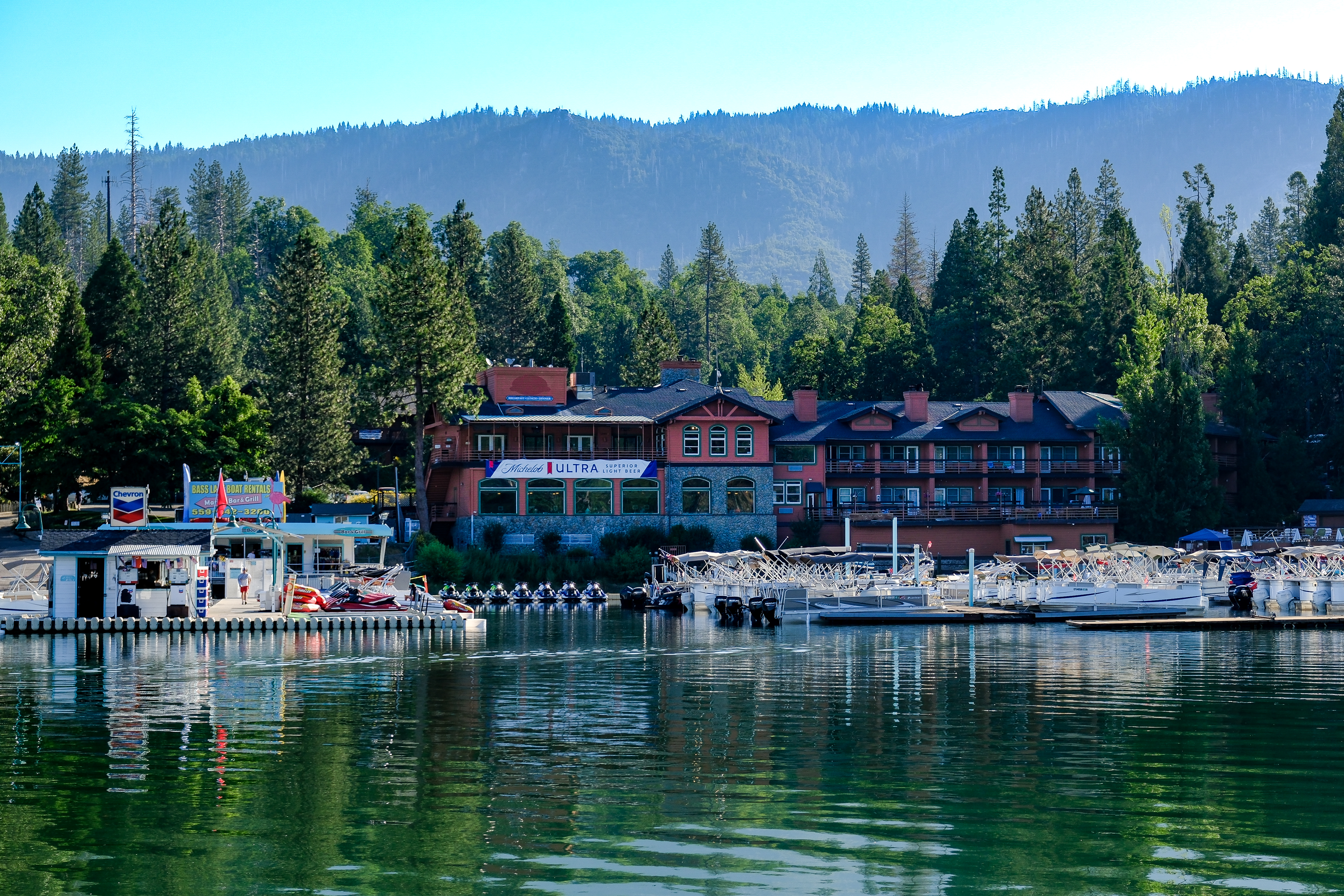
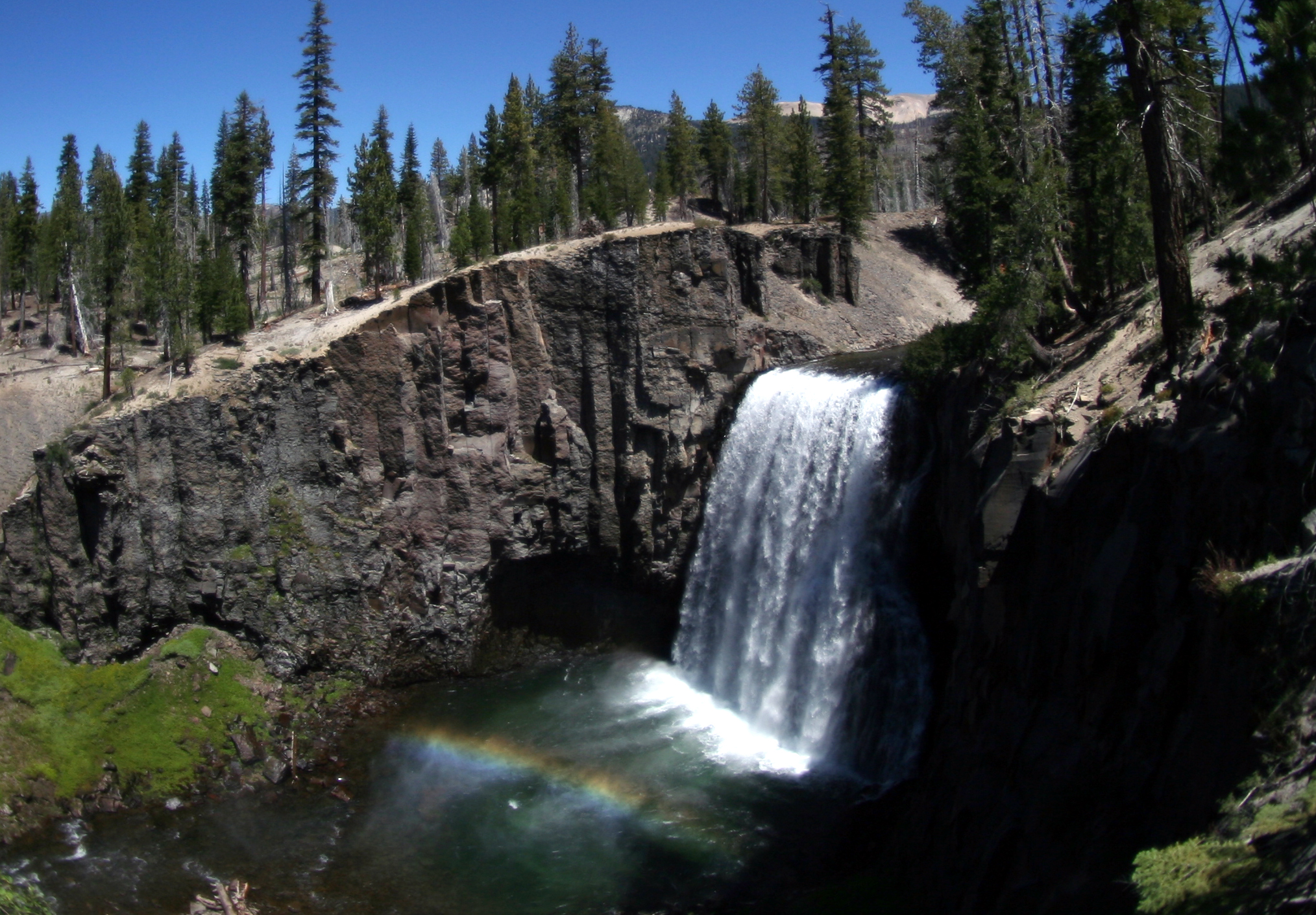
- Banner Peak in Sierra National Forest Madera Devils Postpile Chowchilla Bass Lake Rainbow Falls

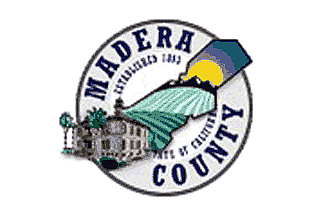
- Flag Logo
- Interactive map of Madera County
- Location in the state of California
- Country: United States
- State: California
- Regions: San Joaquin Valley & Sierra Nevada
- Metropolitan area: Metropolitan Fresno
- Incorporated: 1893
- Named for: Spanish word meaning "wood"
- County seat: Madera
- Largest city: Madera

Government
  - Type: Council–CAO
  - Body: Board of Supervisors
  - Chair: Robert Macaulay
  - Chair Pro Tem: Jordon Wamhoff
  - Board of Supervisors: Supervisors: Jordon Wamhoff; David Rogers; Robert L Poythress; Leticia Gonzalez; Robert Macaulay
  - County Administrative Officer: Jay Varney

Area
  - Total: 2,153 sq mi (5,580 km^{2})
  - Land: 2,137 sq mi (5,530 km^{2})
  - Water: 16 sq mi (41 km^{2})
- Highest elevation: 13,143 ft (4,006 m)

Population (2020)
  - Total: 156,255
  - Estimate (2025): 167,927 ▲
  - Density: 73.12/sq mi (28.23/km^{2})

GDP
  - Total: $7.738 billion (2022)
- Time zone: UTC−8 (Pacific Time Zone)
  - Summer (DST): UTC−7 (Pacific Daylight Time)
- FIPS code: 06-039
- GNIS feature ID: 277284
- Congressional districts: 5th, 13th
- Website: www.maderacounty.com

Madera County (/məˈdɛərə/; Madera, Spanish for "Wood"), officially the County of Madera, is a county located at the geographic center of the U.S. state of California. It features a varied landscape, encompassing the eastern San Joaquin Valley and the central Sierra Nevada, with Madera serving as the county seat. Established in 1893 from part of Fresno County, Madera County reported a population of 156,255 in the 2020 census.

The name Madera is Spanish for "wood," a reference to the county's early lumber industry. Portions of Yosemite National Park lie within the county, and tourism, along with agriculture—particularly almonds, grapes, and pistachios—form major parts of the local economy.

== Etymology ==
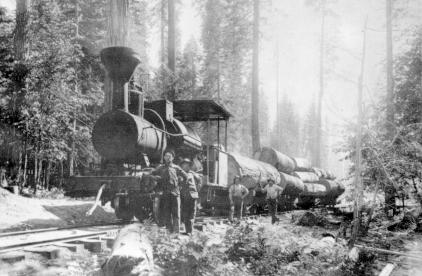
Logging in the Sierra, Madera County, c. 1901

Madera is the Spanish term for wood. The county derives its name from the town of Madera, named when the California Lumber Company built a log flume to carry lumber to the Central Pacific Railroad there in 1876.

== History ==
=== Before 1900 ===
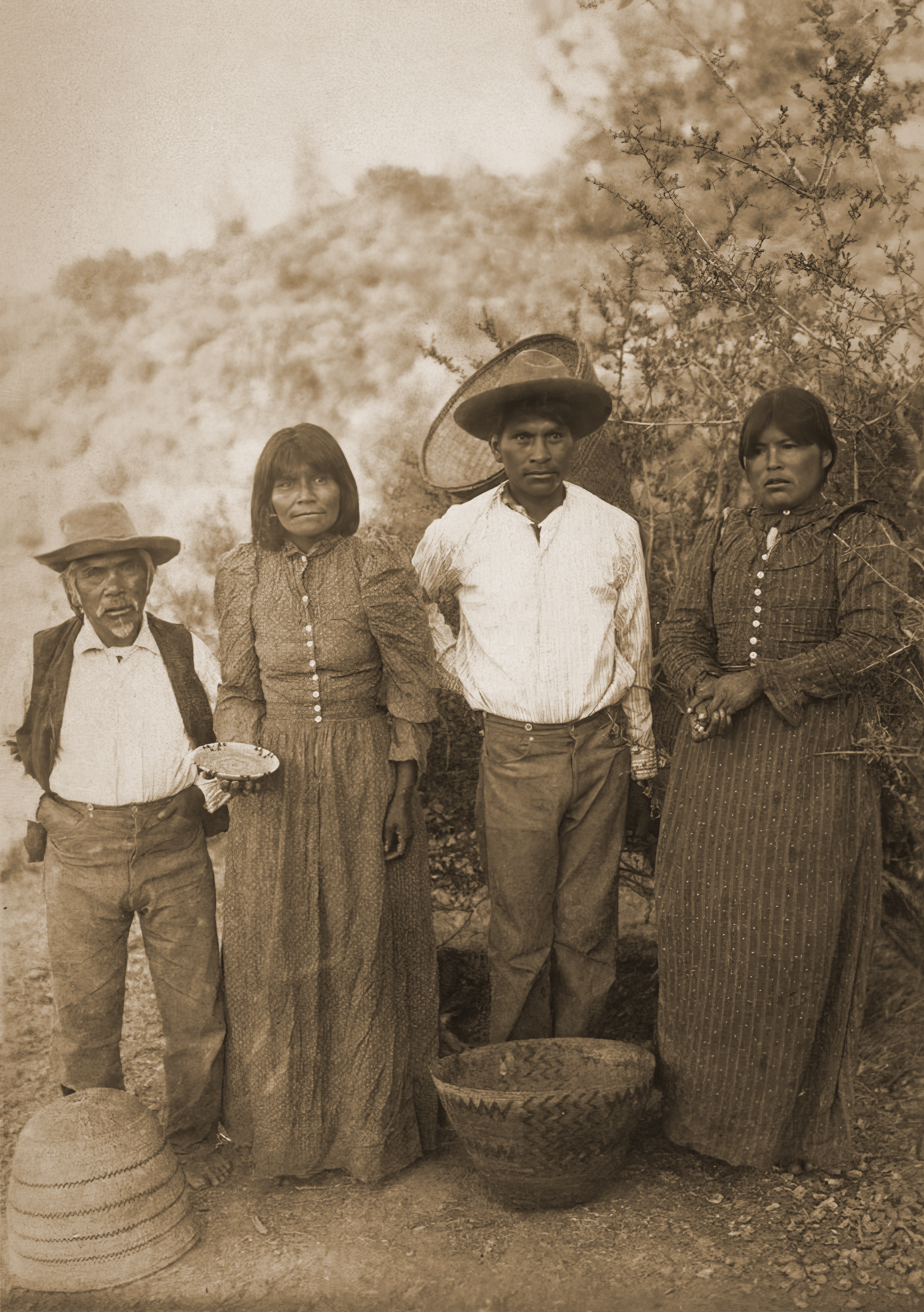
Members of the Western Mono (Nim) community at North Fork, photographed in 1902.

Before the arrival of Europeans, the Mono lived along the upper San Joaquin River, the Chukchansi around Coarsegold and Oakhurst, and the Miwok farther north toward Yosemite Valley. Spanish expeditions passed through the region but established no permanent settlements.

In 1827, American fur trapper Jedediah Smith traveled north through the San Joaquin Valley with a small party of men, and may have passed through the area that became western Madera County. During Mexican rule, the only land grant extending into present-day Madera County was Rancho del Río de San Joaquín, granted to General José Castro in 1846. The rancho straddled the San Joaquin River near present-day Friant.

The California Gold Rush brought miners and settlers to the foothills beginning in 1849. Mining towns developed at Coarsegold, Grub Gulch, and Hildreth. The arrival of miners and settlers brought conflict with Native communities. In 1850, an attack on a trading post at Fresno Crossing, near present-day Coarsegold, led to the Mariposa War. Fighting took place at Crane Valley (now Bass Lake) in 1851. The conflict was part of the wider California genocide.

Mining also created a market for lumber. The first sawmill in what is now Madera County opened on Redwood Creek in 1852, supplying miners and settlers around Coarsegold and Fresno Flats (now Oakhurst). In 1854, Charles Converse and Bill Chitister moved the mill to Crane Valley.

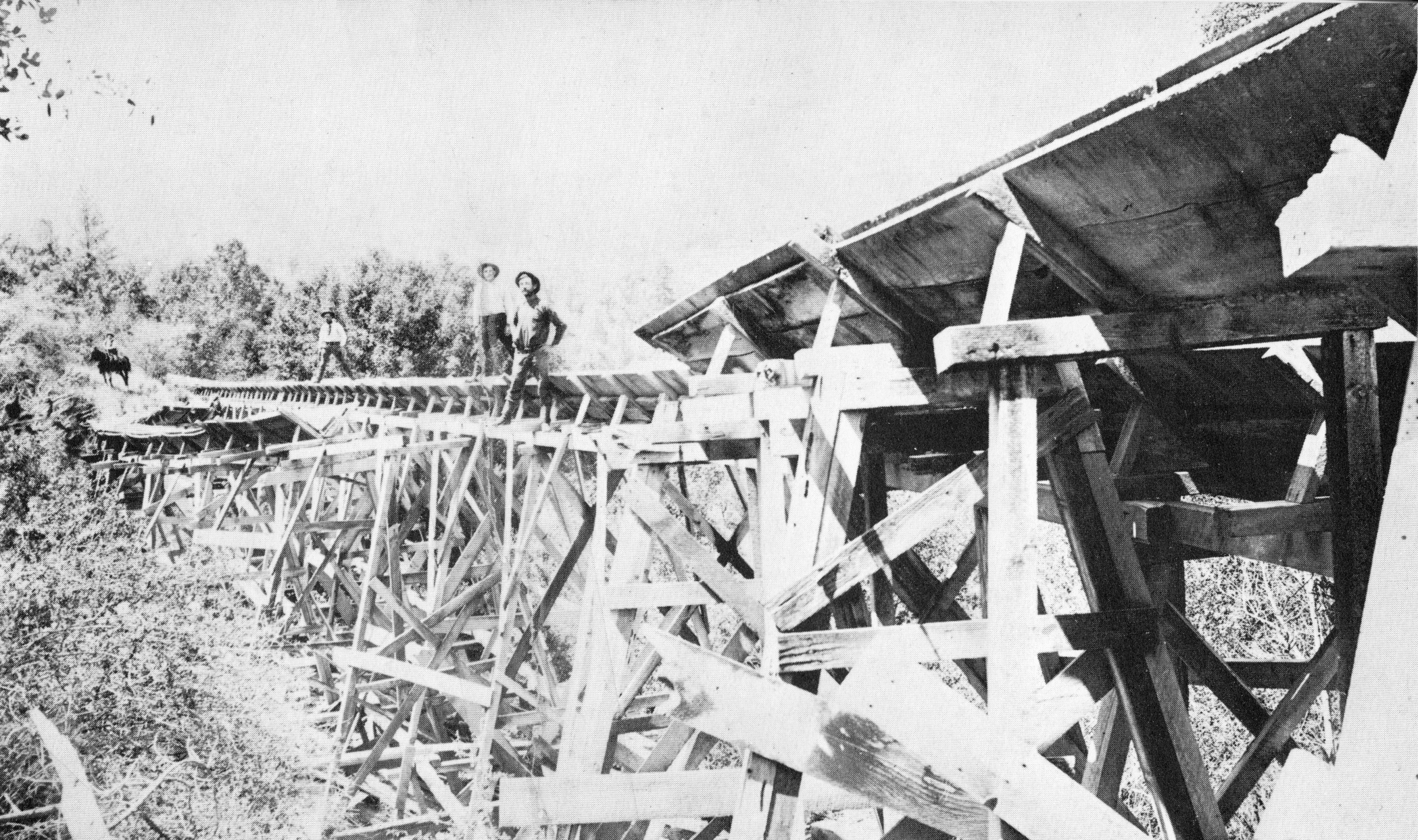
An elevated wooden flume carried lumber from Sierra Nevada sawmills to the railroad at Madera, c. 1877.

The Southern Pacific Railroad reached the San Joaquin Valley in 1872, providing access to larger markets. Mountain sawmills still needed a way to transport lumber to the railroad. In 1874, the California Lumber Company began building a 54 mi (87 km) wooden flume to carry lumber to the valley floor. The company established Madera in 1876 at the junction of the flume and railroad.

The railroad also brought travelers bound for Yosemite Valley to Madera, where they continued by stagecoach through Wawona. Chinese immigrant laborers helped build the Wawona Road, completed in 1875, which provided access to Yosemite Valley from the south. In 1886, the Southern Pacific Railroad extended service to Raymond, shortening the stagecoach journey. The railroad also opened a national market for Raymond granite.

Logging and sheep grazing in the Sierra Nevada created erosion that washed soil into creeks, angering valley farmers whose irrigation depended on mountain watersheds. On February 14, 1893, President Benjamin Harrison established the Sierra Forest Reserve. Today, the Sierra National Forest covers approximately one-quarter of Madera County, including much of its mountainous terrain.

As farming and the town of Madera grew, residents of northern Fresno County sought their own county government. The area north and east of the San Joaquin River was represented by a single county supervisor, and residents complained about inadequate road construction and maintenance. Some foothill residents opposed the division, maintaining longstanding business and personal ties to Fresno.

On May 16, 1893, voters approved the formation of Madera County, 1,179 to 358, and chose Madera over a competing townsite called Minaret as the county seat, 1,065 to 567. The election commission was chaired by Henry Clay Daulton.

The new county inherited a boundary dispute with Mariposa County dating to the creation of Fresno County in 1856. The dispute concerned a stair-stepped boundary that placed the Mariposa Grove of giant sequoias in Mariposa County. In 1904, the California Supreme Court ruled in County of Mariposa v. County of Madera, finding that the boundary was governed by state laws enacted in 1872 and 1874.

=== 20th century ===
In 1900, the Madera Sugar Pine Lumber Company opened the largest sawmill in the Sierra Nevada at Sugar Pine. The company also rebuilt and extended the wooden flume carrying lumber to Madera, described at the time as the longest in the world.

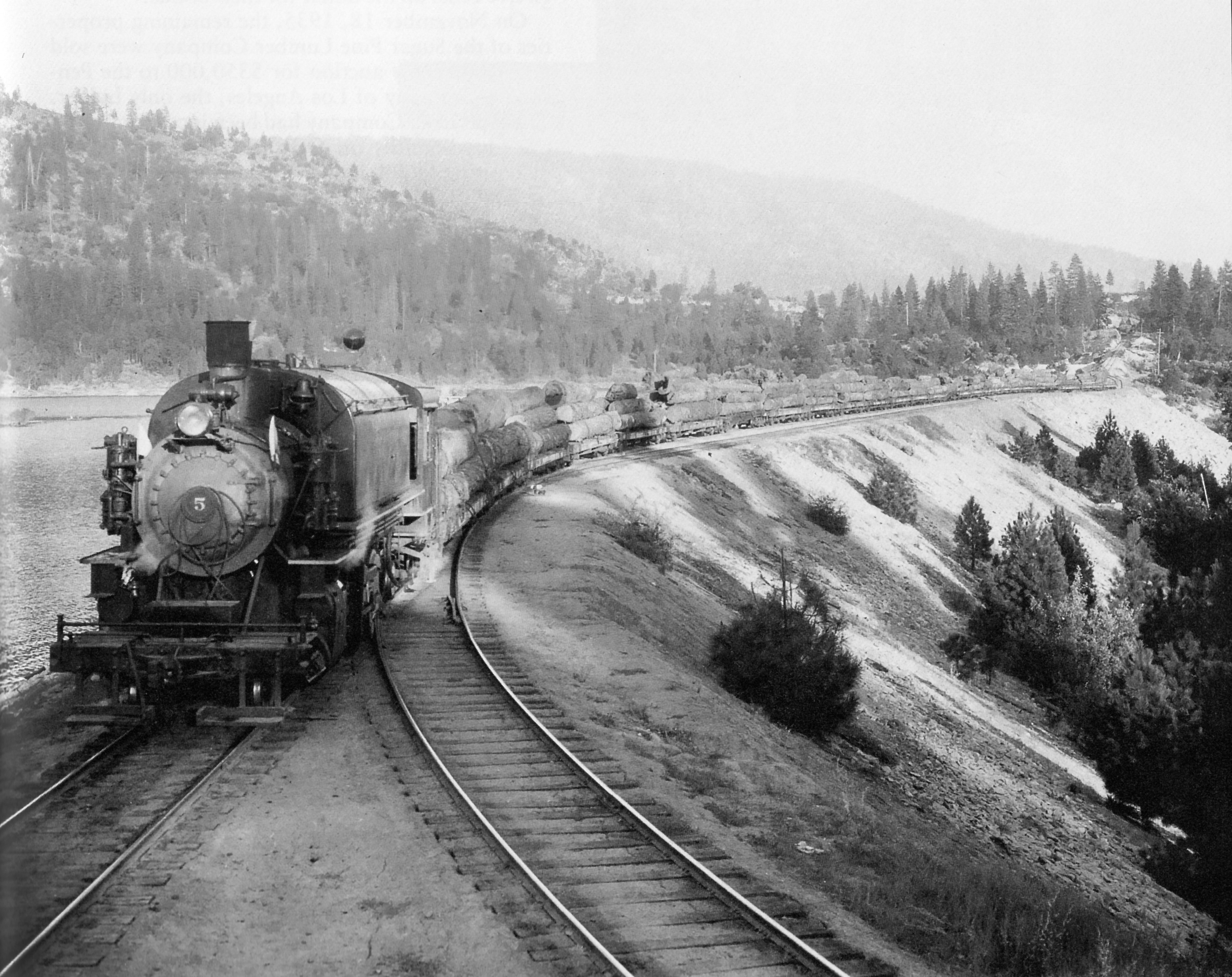
Sugar Pine Lumber Company locomotive No. 5 on the Bass Lake Dam.

In 1901, the San Joaquin Electric Company dammed Willow Creek at Crane Valley to generate electricity for the San Joaquin Valley. A larger dam, completed in 1910, created present-day Bass Lake. In 1923, the Sugar Pine Lumber Company established a railroad switching yard at Wishon and a logging camp at Central Camp, using hydroelectric power to operate its logging equipment.

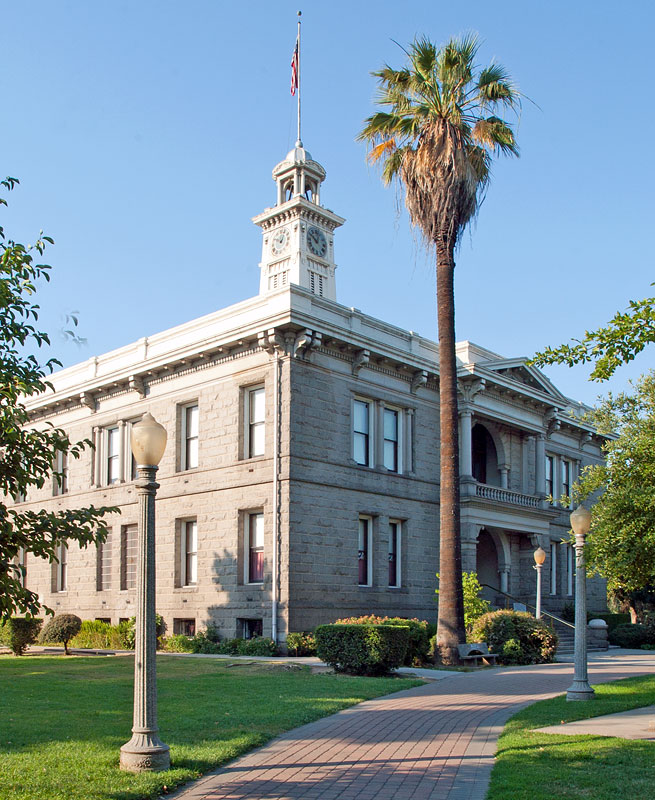
Madera County Courthouse June 2006

The Madera County Courthouse was completed in 1901 using granite quarried near Raymond. That year, granite surpassed gold as the county's leading mineral product. Demand grew after the 1906 San Francisco earthquake, when Raymond granite was used to rebuild the city. The stone was also used in San Francisco's Civic Center, buildings at the University of California, Berkeley, and Los Angeles City Hall.

Friant Dam construction.

In 1912, Orlando A. Robertson divided the Chowchilla Ranch into farms and founded Chowchilla. The Madera Irrigation District was formed in 1920 to bring water from the San Joaquin River, but disputes over water rights delayed construction. Farmers relied mostly on groundwater until the federal government began building Friant Dam in 1939 and the Madera Canal in 1941. Water first entered the canal in 1944, and its completion was celebrated the following year.

The Great Depression brought the Madera Sugar Pine Lumber Company's logging operations to an end in 1931. Its lumberyards in Madera remained open until 1933. As automobile travel expanded, tourism brought new business to the mountain communities. During the 1930s, Highway 41 was developed through Coarsegold and Oakhurst toward Yosemite's South Entrance. The completion of the Wawona Tunnel in 1933 improved automobile access to Yosemite Valley. Tourism brought new hotels and restaurants to Oakhurst along Highway 41, while Bass Lake became a vacation destination, with resorts including The Pines Resort, The Forks Resort, and Ducey's Bass Lake Lodge.

Cotton was Madera County's leading reported crop by value in 1937, followed by grapes and barley. During the 1930s, Dust Bowl migrants from Oklahoma and Arkansas came to Madera County seeking agricultural work. The Bracero Program, established in 1942, brought Mexican agricultural workers under temporary labor agreements. The program continued until 1964.

Logging continued on a smaller scale in the mountains. In 1943, the Associated Lumber and Box Company opened a sawmill in North Fork.

Tungsten was also mined in the county's eastern Sierra Nevada. The Strawberry Mine, in the Jackass Mining District, began production in 1943 and operated intermittently until December 1986. The closure came amid a wider decline in American tungsten mining as prices fell and competition from Chinese producers increased.

Severe flooding along the Fresno River in 1955 and 1969 damaged Madera and surrounding farmland. The floods helped drive construction of Hidden Dam in the 1970s, creating Hensley Lake and providing flood protection for the city. In July 1961, the Harlow Fire swept through the Sierra Nevada foothills, devastating the communities of Ahwahnee and Nipinnawasee. The fire burned more than 40,000 acres and killed two people.

Federal policy toward Native American tribes shifted during the 20th century. The government had established the Picayune Rancheria of Chukchansi Indians near Coarsegold in 1912 and the North Fork Rancheria of Mono Indians in 1916. Both tribes lost federal recognition in 1966 under the California Rancheria Act of 1958 and regained it in 1983 through the Tillie Hardwick lawsuit.

The county's agricultural economy continued to change. By 1967, grapes had surpassed cotton as the leading crop by value. Almond and pistachio cultivation expanded in subsequent decades. By the 1990s, Mixtec migrants from Oaxaca, Mexico, were also working in the county's agricultural sector. In 1997, grapes, almonds, and pistachios accounted for more than 60% of Madera County's reported crop production value.

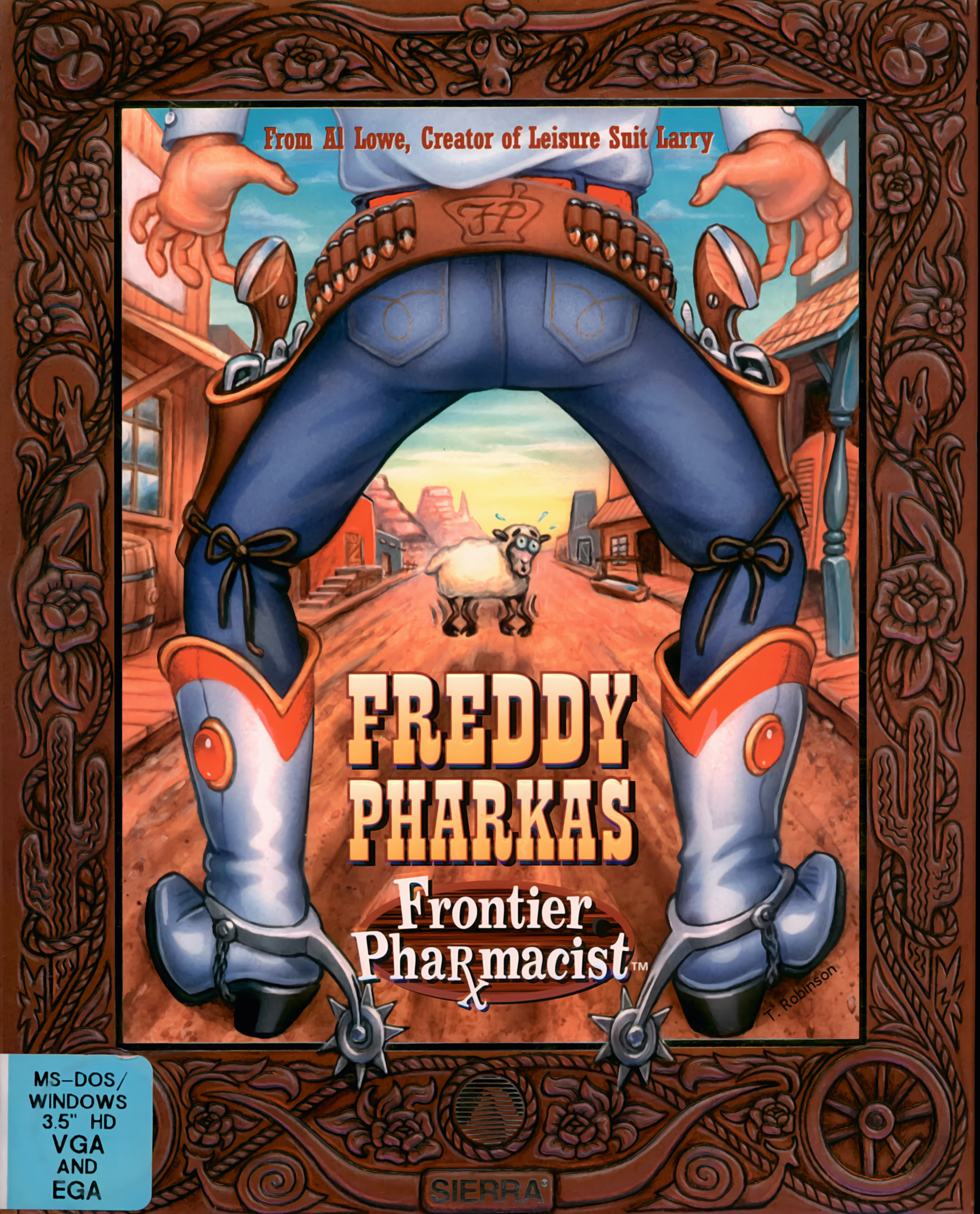
Freddy Pharkas: Frontier Pharmacist (1993), a Western comedy adventure game by Sierra On-Line, set in a fictionalized version of Coarsegold.

In 1980, Ken and Roberta Williams moved their computer game business, then called On-Line Systems, to Coarsegold and opened an office in nearby Oakhurst. Renamed Sierra On-Line in 1982, the company developed PC games, including the King's Quest series, and became one of Oakhurst's largest employers. As the company grew, its rural location made recruiting employees difficult. Sierra moved its corporate headquarters to Bellevue, Washington, in 1993, while retaining game development in Oakhurst until the local studio closed in 1999.

In October 1990, Central California Women's Facility opened in Chowchilla. With a capacity of 2,000 inmates, it was the largest women's prison in the United States.

As timber harvesting declined and federal forest-management policies changed, the North Fork sawmill began laying off workers in 1991. The mill closed in February 1994, ending decades of lumber production. North Fork later lost its bank, pharmacy, doctor's office, and several restaurants.

In 1998, Valley Children's Hospital relocated from Fresno to a new campus in Madera County, just north of the San Joaquin River. The hospital had outgrown its original facility in Fresno, and developer Richard Gunner offered land across the county line for its construction. The hospital subsequently became Madera County's largest private employer.

== Geography ==
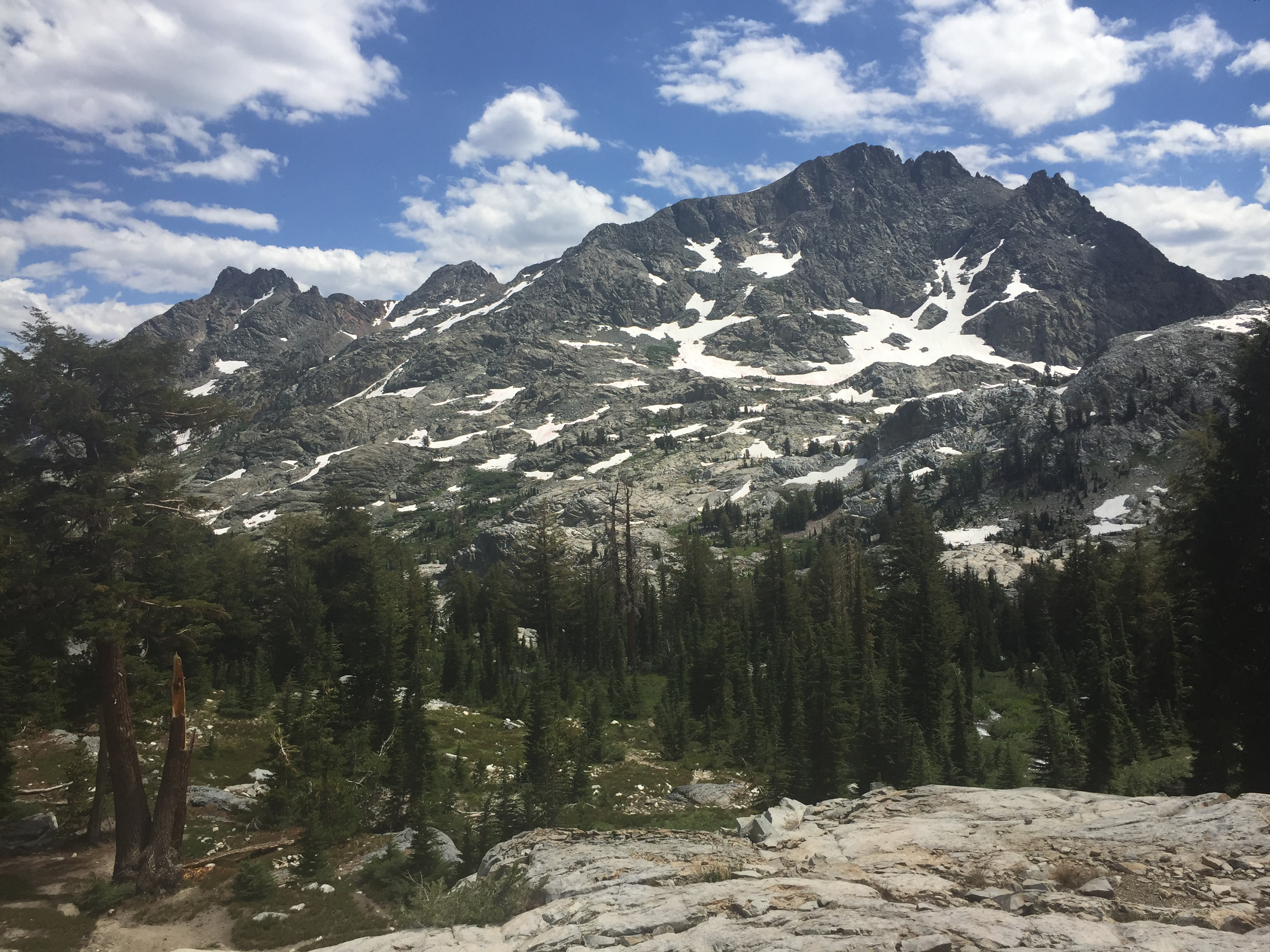
The highest point in Madera county is Mount Ritter, standing at 13,149 feet (4,008 m).

Madera County includes portions of the San Joaquin Valley, the Sierra Nevada foothills, and the Sierra Nevada mountains. Part of Yosemite National Park lies within the county. Major waterways include sections of the San Joaquin River and several reservoirs.

The county has a total area of 2,153 square miles (5,580 km^{2}), of which 2,137 square miles (5,530 km^{2}) is land and 16 square miles (41 km^{2}), or 0.8 percent, is water. The highest point is Mount Ritter, at 13,149 feet (4,008 m).

Climate ranges from arid in the valley to alpine in the higher elevations of the Sierra Nevada.

Madera County is part of the Madera AVA wine region.

=== National protected areas ===
- Devils Postpile National Monument
- Inyo National Forest (part)
- Sierra National Forest (part)
- Yosemite National Park (part)

== Demographics ==
Historical population
Census	Pop.	Note	%±
1900	6,364		—
1910	8,368		31.5%
1920	12,203		45.8%
1930	17,164		40.7%
1940	23,314		35.8%
1950	36,964		58.5%
1960	40,468		9.5%
1970	41,519		2.6%
1980	63,116		52.0%
1990	88,090		39.6%
2000	123,109		39.8%
2010	150,865		22.5%
2020	156,255		3.6%
2025 (est.)	167,927	▲	7.5%
U.S. Decennial Census; 1790–1960 1900–1990; 1990–2000 2010 2020

=== 2020 Census ===
As of the 2020 census, the county had a population of 156,255 and a median age of 35.0 years; 27.5 percent of residents were under the age of 18 and 14.7 percent were 65 years of age or older. For every 100 females there were 99.4 males, and for every 100 females age 18 and over there were 98.0 males age 18 and over.

The racial makeup of the county was 41.8% White, 2.9% Black or African American, 4.9% American Indian and Alaska Native, 2.5% Asian, 0.1% Native Hawaiian and Pacific Islander, 31.6% from some other race, and 16.2% from two or more races. Hispanic or Latino residents of any race comprised 59.6% of the population.

61.4% of residents lived in urban areas, while 38.6 percent lived in rural areas.

There were 45,607 households in the county, of which 42.6 percent had children under the age of 18 living with them and 23.5 percent had a female householder with no spouse or partner present. About 17.2 percent of all households were made up of individuals and 9.3 percent had someone living alone who was 65 years of age or older.

There were 49,572 housing units, of which 8.0 percent were vacant. Among occupied housing units, 64.0 percent were owner-occupied and 36.0 percent were renter-occupied. The homeowner vacancy rate was 1.4 percent and the rental vacancy rate was 3.1 percent.

Nearly half of the county's residents speak a language other than English at home.

=== Immigration estimates ===
Estimates place the number of undocumented immigrants in the county between 12,500 and 15,000.

=== Racial and ethnic composition ===
Madera County, California – racial and ethnic composition Note: the US Census treats Hispanic/Latino as an ethnic category. This table excludes Latinos from the racial categories and assigns them to a separate category. Hispanics/Latinos may be of any race.
Race / ethnicity (NH = Non-Hispanic)	Pop 1980	Pop 1990	Pop 2000	Pop 2010	Pop 2020	% 1980	% 1990	% 2000	% 2010	% 2020
White alone (NH)	42,136	52,974	57,391	57,380	48,399	66.76%	60.14%	46.62%	38.03%	30.97%
Black or African American alone (NH)	2,072	2,294	4,710	5,009	4,131	3.28%	2.60%	3.83%	3.32%	2.64%
Native American or Alaska Native alone (NH)	1,045	1,165	1,694	1,790	1,738	1.66%	1.32%	1.38%	1.19%	1.11%
Asian alone (NH)	625	1,084	1,480	2,533	3,581	0.99%	1.23%	1.20%	1.68%	2.29%
Native Hawaiian or Pacific Islander alone (NH)	x	x	160	107	122	0.13%	0.07%	0.13%	0.07%	0.08%
Other race alone (NH)	322	173	287	649	723	0.51%	0.20%	0.23%	0.43%	0.46%
Mixed-race or multiracial (NH)	x	x	2,872	2,405	4,383	x	x	2.33%	1.59%	2.81%
Hispanic or Latino (any race)	16,916	30,400	54,515	80,992	93,178	26.80%	34.51%	44.28%	53.69%	59.63%
Total	63,116	88,090	123,109	150,865	156,255	100.00%	100.00%	100.00%	100.00%	100.00%

== Economy ==
Pistachio orchard in Chowchilla.

In 2025, Madera County's agricultural production was valued at $2.61 billion, up from $2.33 billion in 2024. Almonds were the leading commodity, followed by milk, pistachios, grapes, and cattle. The county had approximately 12,000 agricultural jobs in 2024, ranking tenth in California, along with 42,700 nonfarm jobs.

Government accounts for nearly one-quarter of county employment. Two state prisons near Chowchilla, the Central California Women's Facility and Valley State Prison, employed approximately 2,300 people combined. Other major public employers include the Madera Unified School District and Madera County government.

Tourism is concentrated in eastern Madera County, particularly around Oakhurst, Bass Lake, and the southern entrance to Yosemite National Park. By 2014, more than one million visitors passed through Madera County on the way to Yosemite every year. In 2024, travel spending in Madera County totaled $432.5 million, supporting approximately 5,400 jobs.

Madera County also shares a workforce with neighboring Fresno County. Census estimates for 2016–2020 found that 14,283 Madera County residents worked in neighboring Fresno County, while 11,377 Fresno County residents worked in Madera County.

==== Tribal gaming ====
The Picayune Rancheria of Chukchansi Indians operates Chukchansi Gold Resort & Casino near Coarsegold, which opened along Highway 41 in 2003. The North Fork Rancheria of Mono Indians opened the North Fork Mono Casino along Highway 99 near Madera in October 2026.

== Education ==
Madera County is mostly covered by the State Center Community College District centered on Fresno City College in Fresno. Other districts with territory within Madera County also include the West Hills Community College District and the Merced Community College District.

School districts include:

Unified:

- Chawanakee Unified School District
- Firebaugh-Las Deltas Unified School District
- Golden Valley Unified School District
- Madera Unified School District
- Yosemite Unified School District - includes some sections zoned for K-12 and some for grades 9–12 only

Secondary:

- Chowchilla Union High School District

Elementary:

- Alview-Dairyland Union Elementary School District
- Bass Lake Joint Union Elementary School District
- Chowchilla Elementary School District
- Raymond-Knowles Union Elementary School District

== Government, policing, and politics ==
=== Government ===
Madera County is organized as a General Law County under the provision of the California Government Code. The county has five supervisorial districts and one supervisor is elected from each district every four years. The government of Madera County is mandated by the California Constitution to have a five-member board of supervisors elected to staggered four-year terms. The board consists of: District 1, Jordan Wamhoff; District 2, David Rogers; District 3, Robert Poythress; District 4, Leticia Gonzalez; District 5, Robert Macaulay; and County Administrator Jay Varney. Staff provide for voter registration and elections, law enforcement, jails, vital records, property records, tax collection, public health, roads, and social services for the entire county. It is the local government for all unincorporated areas. Other elected offices include Sheriff Tyson Pogue, District Attorney Sally Orme Moreno, Assessor Brian Glover (acting), Auditor-Controller David Richstone, Treasurer-Tax Collector Tracy Kennedy, and Clerk/Registrar of Voters-Recorder Rebecca Martinez.

=== Policing ===
==== Madera County Sheriff's Office ====
The sheriff's office and staff provide court protection, jail administration, and coroner service for all of Madera County with its total population of approximately 156,000 residents. The sheriff provides police patrol and detective services to the unincorporated areas of the county, which contain approximately 70,000 residents, or 45% of Madera County's total population. The sheriff's main station and offices are in the City of Madera. There are two sheriff's substations: Oakhurst, population 3,000, and the Madera Ranchos, population 12,000, both on Highway 41 to Yosemite National Park in the Sierras.

==== Municipal police departments ====
The municipal police departments within Madera County are Madera, the county seat, population 62,000, and Chowchilla, population 19,600.

=== Correctional facilities ===
Madera County has three correctional facilities. The Madera County Jail is managed by the elected sheriff.Valley State Prison is a state-run prison located in Chowchilla. The Central California Women's Facility is also in Chowchilla, across from Valley State Prison. Inmates are counted in the county's census population.

=== Politics ===
==== Voter registration ====
Population and registered voters
Total population	149,611	
Registered voters (Note: Percentage of registered voters with respect to total population. Percentages of party members with respect to registered voters follow.)	53,782	35.9%
Democratic	18,212	33.9%
Republican	23,858	44.4%
Democratic–Republican spread	-5,646	-10.5%
Independent	1,615	3.0%
Green	208	0.4%
Libertarian	264	0.5%
Peace and Freedom	131	0.2%
Americans Elect	0	0.0%
Other	191	0.4%
No party preference	9,303	17.3%

==== Cities by population and voter registration ====
Cities by population and voter registration
City	Population	Registered voters	Democratic	Republican	D–R spread	Other	No party preference
Chowchilla	18,465	22.5%	30.8%	45.1%	-14.3%	9.0%	18.8%
Madera	60,221	26.8%	44.9%	33.1%	+11.8%	6.2%	18.4%

=== Overview ===
Madera is a strongly Republican county in presidential and congressional elections. The last Democrat to win a majority in the county was Jimmy Carter in 1976.

United States presidential election results for Madera County, California (Note: This total comprised 943 votes for Progressive Theodore Roosevelt (who was official Republican nominee in California), 226 votes for Socialist Eugene V. Debs and 89 votes for Prohibition Party nominee Eugene W. Chafin.)
Year	Republican		Democratic		Third party(ies)	
Year	No.	%	No.	%	No.	%
1896	452	37.32%	739	61.02%	20	1.65%
1900	764	49.58%	737	47.83%	40	2.60%
1904	784	51.85%	610	40.34%	118	7.80%
1908	596	44.85%	574	43.19%	159	11.96%
1912	1	0.04%	1,154	47.71%	1,264	52.25%
1916	1,323	38.01%	1,880	54.01%	278	7.99%
1920	1,779	55.46%	1,145	35.69%	284	8.85%
1924	1,518	42.66%	450	12.65%	1,590	44.69%
1928	2,354	54.88%	1,896	44.21%	39	0.91%
1932	1,243	25.22%	3,457	70.15%	228	4.63%
1936	1,387	22.61%	4,646	75.74%	101	1.65%
1940	2,653	31.20%	5,749	67.61%	101	1.19%
1944	2,865	39.85%	4,276	59.47%	49	0.68%
1948	3,416	38.03%	5,226	58.18%	340	3.79%
1952	6,278	49.67%	6,244	49.40%	118	0.93%
1956	5,239	42.12%	7,162	57.58%	38	0.31%
1960	5,869	41.75%	8,126	57.81%	62	0.44%
1964	4,461	32.18%	9,391	67.75%	10	0.07%
1968	6,229	43.55%	6,932	48.47%	1,142	7.98%
1972	7,835	52.61%	6,580	44.18%	477	3.20%
1976	6,844	45.96%	7,625	51.20%	423	2.84%
1980	10,599	53.58%	7,783	39.35%	1,398	7.07%
1984	13,954	60.04%	8,994	38.70%	293	1.26%
1988	13,255	54.59%	10,642	43.83%	384	1.58%
1992	13,066	43.20%	10,863	35.92%	6,316	20.88%
1996	16,510	53.85%	11,254	36.70%	2,898	9.45%
2000	20,283	60.74%	11,650	34.89%	1,462	4.38%
2004	24,871	64.02%	13,481	34.70%	498	1.28%
2008	23,583	55.68%	17,952	42.38%	820	1.94%
2012	22,852	57.32%	16,018	40.18%	996	2.50%
2016	23,357	54.18%	17,029	39.50%	2,726	6.32%
2020	29,378	54.68%	23,168	43.12%	1,186	2.21%
2024	32,344	59.20%	20,981	38.40%	1,307	2.39%

Madera is split between the 5th and 13th congressional districts, represented by Tom McClintock (R–Elk Grove) and Adam Gray (D–Merced), respectively.

With respect to the California State Assembly, the county is split between the 8th Assembly district, represented by Republican David Tangipa, and the 27th Assembly district, represented by Democrat Esmeralda Soria.

In the California State Senate, Madera is split between the 4th senatorial district, represented by Republican Marie Alvarado-Gil, and the 14th senatorial district, represented by Democrat Anna Caballero.

On November 4, 2008, Madera County voted 73.4% for Proposition 8, which amended the California Constitution to define marriage as a union between one man and one woman.

The county is one of three counties in California to establish a separate department to deal with corrections, pursuant to California Government Code §23013, the Madera County Department of Corrections, along with Napa County and Santa Clara County. The officers receive their powers under 831 and 831.5 of the California Penal Code.

== Crime ==
The following table includes the number of incidents reported and the rate per 1,000 persons for each type of offense.

Population and crime rates
Population	149,611	
Violent crime	685	4.58
Homicide	3	0.02
Forcible rape	36	0.24
Robbery	162	1.08
Aggravated assault	484	3.24
Property crime	2,144	14.33
Burglary	1,166	7.79
Larceny-theft	1,484	9.92
Motor vehicle theft	520	3.48
Arson	18	0.12

=== Cities by population and crime rates ===
Cities by population and crime rates
City	Population	Violent crimes	Violent crime rate per 1,000 persons	Property crimes	Property crime rate per 1,000 persons
Chowchilla	19,221	115	5.98	446	23.20
Madera	62,796	466	7.42	1,621	25.81

== Attractions ==
- The Balls
- Bass Lake
- Chukchansi Gold Resort & Casino
- Corlieu Falls
- Ducey's Bass Lake Lodge
- The Forks Resort
- Fresno Dome
- Hensley Lake
- Madera AVA
- Mammoth Pool Reservoir
- Mount Ritter
- Nelder Grove
- The Pines Resort
- Shuteye Peak
- Sierra Vista Scenic Byway
- Willow Creek
- Yosemite National Park

== Transportation ==
=== Major highways ===
- State Route 41
- State Route 49
- State Route 99
- State Route 145
- State Route 152
- State Route 233

=== Areas inaccessible by road ===
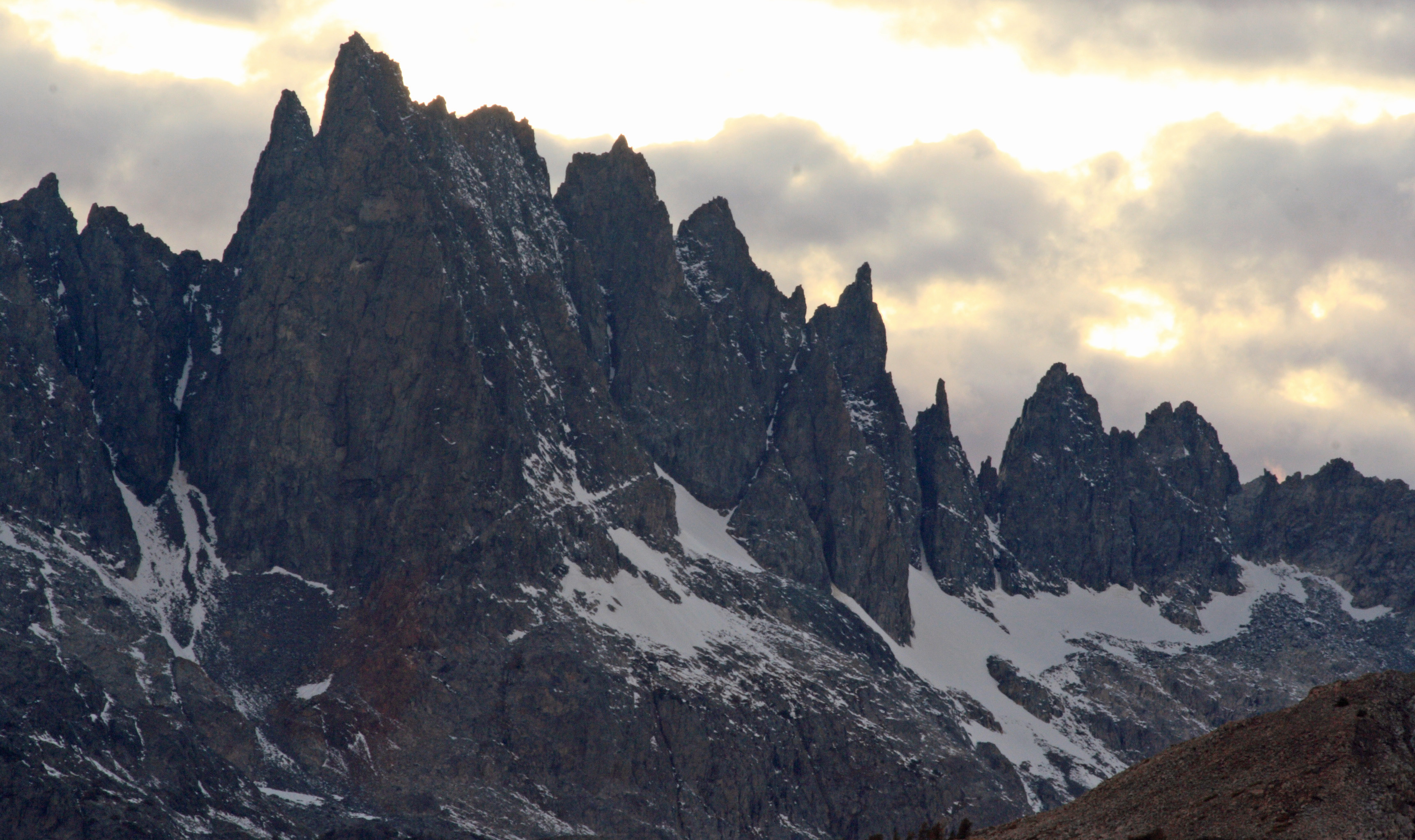
Minaret Summit, located on the border between Madera and Mono counties, is inaccessible by road from the rest of Madera County.

Eastern Madera County includes areas such as Devils Postpile National Monument and Minaret Summit that are not accessible by road from the rest of the county. Access is through California State Route 203, which crosses into Mono County and connects to Mammoth Lakes. Red's Meadow Road branches from this route to reach Devils Postpile.

A gap of less than 10 miles (16 km) separates the end of Minaret Road, extending northeast from North Fork, from the terminus of Red's Meadow Road in the Eastern Sierra. In the 20th century, proposals were advanced to link the San Joaquin Valley and the Eastern Sierra by highway or tunnel across Minaret Summit. To preserve the option for such a project, an area southwest of the summit was excluded from the Wilderness Act of 1964.

In the 1970s, Governor Ronald Reagan opposed the highway proposal after visiting the region. The area was later designated as wilderness under the California Wilderness Act of 1984.

=== Public transportation ===
- Madera County Connection provides service between the cities of Madera and Chowchilla. Routes also run to eastern Madera County. A connection to Fresno can be made at Valley Children's Hospital near the county line.
- The cities of Madera and Chowchilla also have their own local, intracity transit services named Madera Metro and Chowchilla Area Transit, respectively.
- Greyhound buses and Amtrak trains stop in Madera.

=== Airports ===
- Madera Municipal Airport and Chowchilla Airport are general aviation airports.

== Communities ==
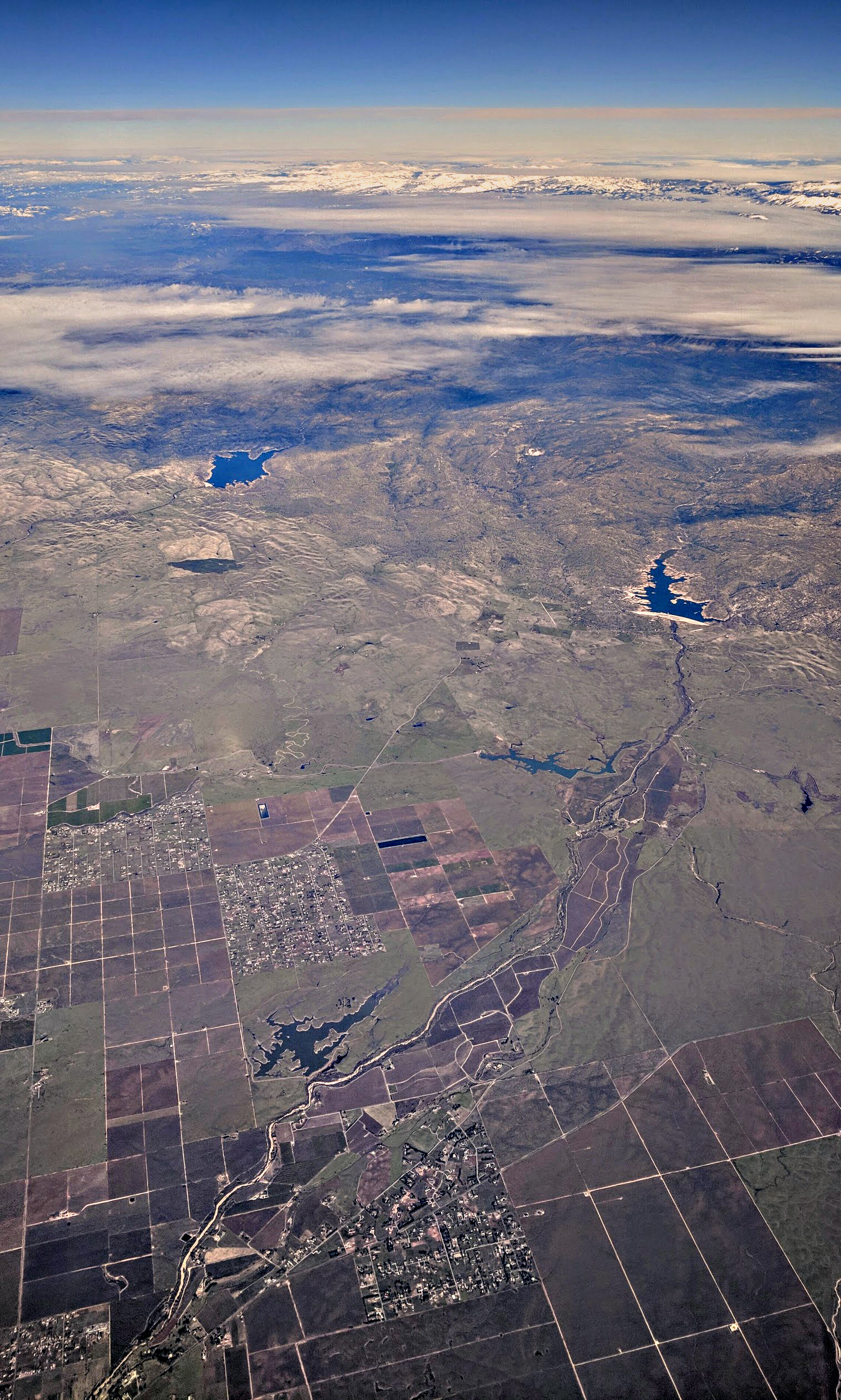
Aerial view from Madera, California, toward the snow-capped Sierras. Eastman Lake (upper left) is on the border of Madera County and Mariposa County. Hensley Lake (upper right) is near the center of Madera County. Madera Lake (lower left) is on the outskirts of Madera.

=== Cities ===
- Chowchilla
- Madera (county seat)

=== Census-designated places ===
- Ahwahnee
- Bass Lake
- Bonadelle Ranchos
- Coarsegold
- Fairmead
- La Vina
- Madera Acres
- Madera Ranchos
- Nipinnawasee
- North Fork
- Oakhurst
- Parksdale
- Parkwood
- Rolling Hills
- Yosemite Lakes

=== Unincorporated communities ===
- Knowles
- O'Neals
- Raymond
- Ripperdan
- Sugar Pine
- Sumner Hill

=== Population ranking ===
The population ranking of the following table is based on the 2010 census of Madera County.

† county seat

Rank	City/town	Municipal type	Population (2010 Census)
1	† Madera	City	61,416
2	Chowchilla	City	18,720
3	Madera Acres	CDP	9,163
4	Bonadelle Ranchos-Madera Ranchos	CDP	8,569
5	Yosemite Lakes	CDP	4,952
6	Oakhurst	CDP	2,829
7	Parksdale	CDP	2,621
8	Parkwood	CDP	2,268
9	Ahwahnee	CDP	2,246
10	Coarsegold	CDP	1,840
11	Fairmead	CDP	1,447
12	Rolling Hills	CDP	742
13	Bass Lake	CDP	527
14	Nipinnawasee	CDP	475
15	La Vina	CDP	279
16	Picayune Rancheria (Chukchansi Indians)	AIAN	69
17	Northfork Rancheria (Mono Indians)	AIAN	60

== See also ==
- Sierra National Forest
- Nelder Grove
- Fresno Dome
- List of museums in the San Joaquin Valley
- List of school districts in Madera County, California
- Madera Community Hospital
- National Register of Historic Places listings in Madera County, California
- USS Madera County (LST-905)
