= Bonadelle Ranchos, California =

Unincorporated community in California, United States

Bonadelle Ranchos
- Census-designated place
- Location within California Location within the United States
- Coordinates: 36°57′50″N 119°53′37″W
- Country: United States
- State: California
- County: Madera

Area
  - Total: 9.01 sq mi (23.3 km^{2})
  - Land: 9.01 sq mi (23.3 km^{2})
  - Water: 0.0 sq mi (0 km^{2}) 0%
- Elevation: 338 ft (103 m)

Population (2020)
  - Total: 5,497
  - Density: 610.1/sq mi (235.6/km^{2})
- Time zone: UTC-8 (Pacific (PST))
  - Summer (DST): UTC-7 (PDT)
- ZIP Code: 93636 (Madera)
- Area code: 559
- GNIS feature IDs: 2805049
- FIPS code: 06-07378

Bonadelle Ranchos is an unincorporated community and census-designated place (CDP) in Madera County, California, United States. It lies at an elevation of 338 feet (103 m). As of the 2020 census, it had a population of 5,497. Prior to 2020, the community was part of the Bonadelle Ranchos-Madera Ranchos CDP.

== Geography ==
The community is in southern Madera County, 9 miles (14 km) east of Madera, the county seat, and 22 miles (35 km) north-northwest of downtown Fresno. It is bordered to the southeast by the Madera Ranchos CDP. The foothills of the Sierra Nevada begin about 7 miles (11 km) to the northeast.

According to the U.S. Census Bureau, the community has an area of 9.0 square miles (23 km^{2}), all land.

== Demographics ==
Historical population
Census	Pop.	Note	%±
2020	5,497		—
U.S. Decennial Census; 1850–1870 1880-1890; 1900 1910 1920; 1930 1940 1950; 1960 1970 1980; 1990 2000 2010

Bonadelle Ranchos first appeared as a census designated place in the 2020 U.S. census after the Bonadelle Ranchos-Madera Ranchos CDP was split into the Bonadelle Ranchos CDP and the Madera Ranchos CDP.

=== 2020 census ===
As of the 2020 census, Bonadelle Ranchos had a population of 5,497. The median age was 39.7 years. 24.4% of residents were under the age of 18 and 17.2% of residents were 65 years of age or older. For every 100 females there were 101.9 males, and for every 100 females age 18 and over there were 101.7 males age 18 and over.

0.0% of residents lived in urban areas, while 100.0% lived in rural areas.

There were 1,740 households in Bonadelle Ranchos, of which 38.8% had children under the age of 18 living in them. Of all households, 67.6% were married-couple households, 13.3% were households with a male householder and no spouse or partner present, and 13.7% were households with a female householder and no spouse or partner present. About 13.1% of all households were made up of individuals and 6.7% had someone living alone who was 65 years of age or older.

There were 1,784 housing units, of which 2.5% were vacant. The homeowner vacancy rate was 0.4% and the rental vacancy rate was 3.7%.

Bonadelle Ranchos CDP, California – Racial and ethnic composition Note: the US Census treats Hispanic/Latino as an ethnic category. This table excludes Latinos from the racial categories and assigns them to a separate category. Hispanics/Latinos may be of any race.
Race / Ethnicity (NH = Non-Hispanic)	Pop 2020	% 2020
White alone (NH)	3,107	56.52%
Black or African American alone (NH)	57	1.04%
Native American or Alaska Native alone (NH)	47	0.86%
Asian alone (NH)	149	2.71%
Pacific Islander alone (NH)	6	0.11%
Other race alone (NH)	28	0.51%
Mixed race or Multiracial (NH)	255	4.64%
Hispanic or Latino (any race)	1,848	33.62%
Total	5,497	100.00%
