= Bonadelle Ranchos-Madera Ranchos, California =

Bonadelle Ranchos- Madera Ranchos
- Former census-designated place
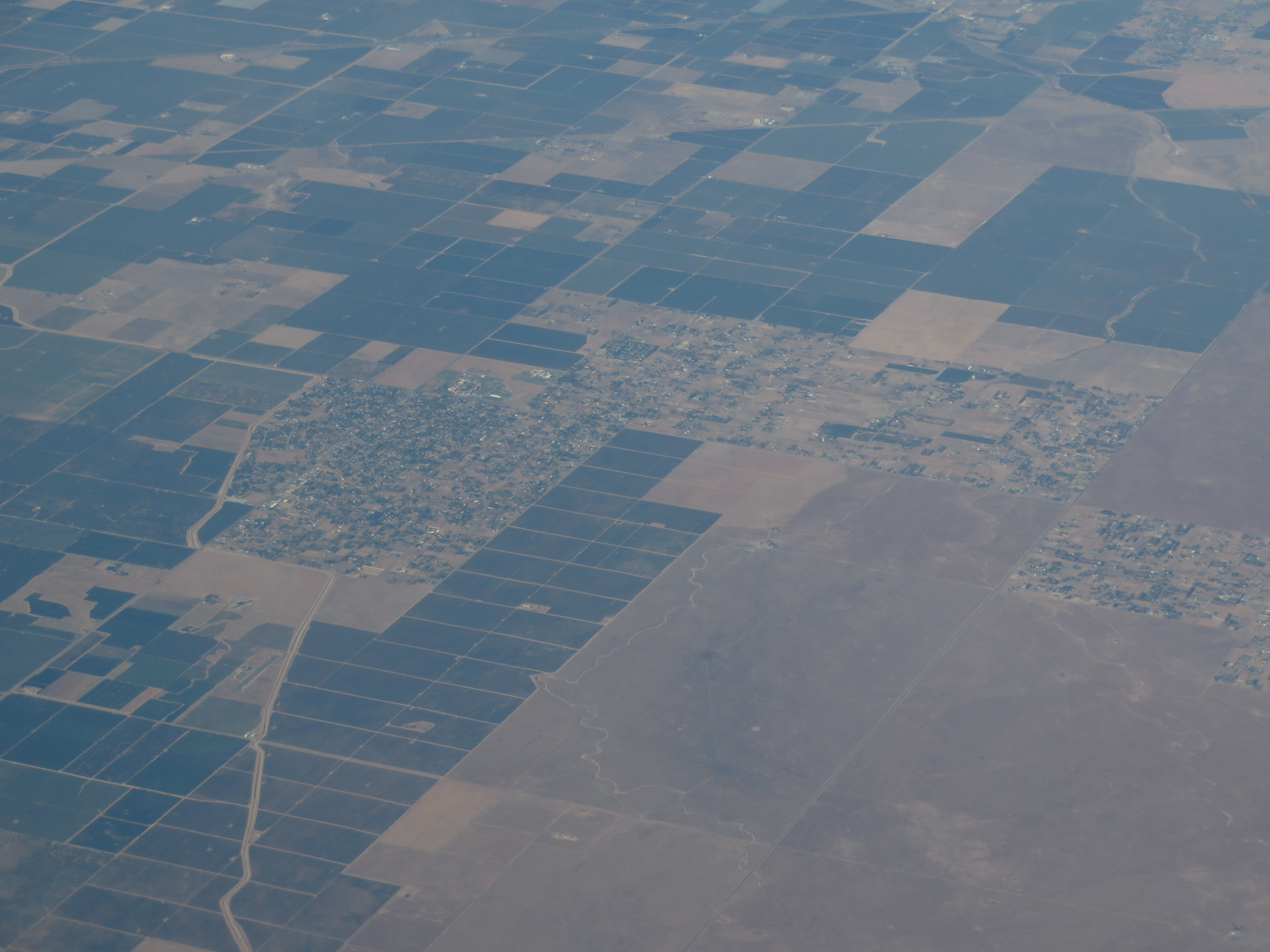
- Aerial view of Bonadelle Ranchos-Madera Ranchos
- Nickname: The Chos
- Location in Madera County and the state of California

- Location in the United States
- Coordinates: 36°56′11″N 119°53′12″W
- Country: United States
- State: California
- County: Madera

Area
  - Total: 11.64 sq mi (30.14 km^{2})
  - Land: 11.64 sq mi (30.14 km^{2})
  - Water: 0 sq mi (0.00 km^{2}) 0%
- Elevation: 311–422 ft (95–129 m)

Population (2010)
  - Total: 8,569
  - Density: 736/sq mi (284.3/km^{2})
- Time zone: UTC-8 (Pacific (PST))
  - Summer (DST): UTC-7 (PDT)
- ZIP code: 93636 (Madera)
- Area code: 559
- FIPS code: 06-07379
- GNIS feature ID: 2407879

Bonadelle Ranchos and Madera Ranchos are a pair of communities in Madera County, California, United States. They are part of the Madera–Chowchilla Metropolitan Statistical Area. Prior to 2020, the communities were part of the Bonadelle Ranchos-Madera Ranchos Census Designated Place, with a population of 8,569 at the 2010 census. For the 2020 census, the area was split into two CDPs, Bonadelle Ranchos and Madera Ranchos.

== General information ==
The Bonadelle Ranchos-Madera Ranchos community is located at 36°56′11″N 119°53′12″W (36.936378, -119.886723).

According to the United States Census Bureau, in 2010 the CDP had a total area of 11.6 square miles (30 km^{2}), all of it land.

== Environment ==
The Bonadelle Ranchos is often regarded as a Valley-Foothill transitional zone, because its elevation is higher than average for valley but slightly too low to be considered part of the Sierra foothills. About 7 miles (11 km) to the northeast lie the rugged foothills of the Sierra Nevada range. Its environment corresponds, showing qualities of a transition zone. The northeast portion of the area is the highest in elevation, and small tabletop hills are present: most notably Adobe Hill, with an elevation of 640 feet (200 m). Throughout the area there are large, rolling hills. Multiple creeks run through the area, but none are large enough to bring constant flow. The creeks include Little Dry Creek, Bonadelle Creek, Cottonwood Creek, and Root Creek. Many of these waterways flow in the winter months, when rainfall and snow filter down from the nearby foothills. There are many seasonal ponds in the area, but most are too small and short-lived to offer recreational activities. Much of the wildlife is typical for this type of environment. Mammals include foxes, ground squirrels, coyotes, raccoons, skunks and occasionally bobcats and mountain lions. Dove, crows, ravens, ducks, Scrub jays, California woodpeckers, egrets, red tailed hawks, turkey vultures, and geese can be found as well.

== Climate ==
The climate in this area is noticeably different than the nearby cities, often 3 to 10 °F (2 to 6 °C) cooler during the winter months. Because of the openness of the surrounding areas, wind and storm systems can often become a temperature factor.

The climate in the area varies drastically throughout the year. Spring in the area is warm and mild, starting in March and ending in May. Temperatures generally reach the high 60s (in March). April-Mays highs reach the 70s and 80s, and nightly lows can still be in the mid 30s (in April), although the average low is 45 to 50 °F (7 to 10 °C). Many trees often begin to bloom as early as March.

Summer in the area is very hot and starts in June, lasting until early October. Temperatures regularly exceed 100 °F (38 °C). Sun is constant with essentially no clouds. Nightly lows in the area generally are in the high 50s and 60s, although some extremes have even reached the high 40s. Because of the virtual absence of rainfall, drought is constant through summer, and the risk of fire is high.

Fall in the area is mild, with highs in the 60s and 70s (°F), although some late fall patterns have highs still in the 80s. Fall is usually short lived, only encompassing mid-October until the end of November. That is typically when winter weather starts to move in. Nightly lows can greatly vary this time of year. Lows are generally 35 to 50 °F (2 to 10 °C), but in some cases can reach as low as 32 °F (0 °C).

Winters are generally mild, although variances can occur. The area experiences thick Tule fog, which is extremely dense fog that limits visibility to 500 feet (150 m) in some cases. Tule fog can last all day, although this is not a very common occurrence. The area experiences rain from November to March. Snow is never present in any measurable amount, but in some cases precipitation and temperature can coincide and bring flurries. They are short and nearly impactless. Winter lows can dip down quite low for California standards, as lows have been known to drop down to the high teens and 20s, although most winter lows are in the 30s and frost is quite prevalent. Highs in winter are in the 40s–50s, and most days are sunny with high-altitude clouds. Very windy days are present every winter, and these patterns may last for weeks at a time.

== History ==
The Bonadelle Ranchos has a relatively long history, but not much is known about it. John Bonadelle, the founder of the area, was a landowner and owned most of the properties in the area. Many of the streets were named by him. Street names were often sold to people in Hollywood, who sometimes named them after themselves. Settlement began as early as 1940, but the movement trend boomed in the 1970s and continued on.

Bonadelle originally purchased the land from one of the three Smith family siblings that split the land into thirds once their father had passed. Currently, Kirby Smith still owns a comparable amount of land to the Bonadelle Ranchoes, which lies to the east and continues until Highway 41.

== Demographics ==
Historical population
Census	Pop.	Note	%±
1980	3,272		—
1990	5,705		74.4%
2000	7,300		28.0%
2010	8,569		17.4%
U.S. Decennial Census; 1980; 1990 2000 2010

Bonadelle Ranchos-Madera Ranchos first appeared as a census designated place in the 1980 U.S. census; the CDP was deleted after being split into the Bonadelle Ranchos CDP and the Madera Ranchos CDP prior to the 2020 U.S. census.

=== 2010 ===
At the 2010 census Bonadelle Ranchos-Madera Ranchos had a population of 8,569. The population density was 739.7 inhabitants per square mile (285.6/km^{2}). The racial makeup of Bonadelle Ranchos-Madera Ranchos was 7,034 (82.1%) White, 114 (1.3%) African American, 120 (1.4%) Native American, 207 (2.4%) Asian, 4 (0.0%) Pacific Islander, 811 (9.5%) from other races, and 279 (3.3%) from two or more races. Hispanic or Latino of any race were 2,305 persons (26.9%).

The census reported that 8,564 people (99.9% of the population) lived in households, 5 (0.1%) lived in non-institutionalized group quarters, and no one was institutionalized.

There were 2,804 households, 1,076 (38.4%) had children under the age of 18 living in them, 2,034 (72.5%) were opposite-sex married couples living together, 218 (7.8%) had a female householder with no husband present, 141 (5.0%) had a male householder with no wife present. There were 107 (3.8%) unmarried opposite-sex partnerships, and 14 (0.5%) same-sex married couples or partnerships. 318 households (11.3%) were one person and 120 (4.3%) had someone living alone who was 65 or older. The average household size was 3.05. There were 2,393 families (85.3% of households); the average family size was 3.27.

The age distribution was 2,126 people (24.8%) under the age of 18, 737 people (8.6%) aged 18 to 24, 1,841 people (21.5%) aged 25 to 44, 2,862 people (33.4%) aged 45 to 64, and 1,003 people (11.7%) who were 65 or older. The median age was 41.5 years. For every 100 females, there were 102.1 males. For every 100 females age 18 and over, there were 100.4 males.

There were 2,937 housing units at an average density of 253.5 per square mile, of the occupied units 2,521 (89.9%) were owner-occupied and 283 (10.1%) were rented. The homeowner vacancy rate was 1.7%; the rental vacancy rate was 5.0%. 7,564 people (88.3% of the population) lived in owner-occupied housing units and 1,000 people (11.7%) lived in rental housing units.

=== 2000 ===
At the 2000 census there were 7,300 people, 2,327 households, and 2,047 families in the CDP. The population density was 627.6 inhabitants per square mile (242.3/km^{2}). There were 2,381 housing units at an average density of 204.7 per square mile (79.0/km^{2}). The racial makeup of the CDP was 85.42% White, 1.40% Black or African American, 1.19% Native American, 1.14% Asian, 0.08% Pacific Islander, 7.67% from other races, and 3.10% from two or more races. 18.85% of the population were Hispanic or Latino of any race. Of the 2,327 households 41.9% had children under the age of 18 living with them, 77.6% were married couples living together, 6.5% had a female householder with no husband present, and 12.0% were non-families. 8.3% of households were one person and 2.4% were one person aged 65 or older. The average household size was 3.13 and the average family size was 3.30.

The age distribution was 29.1% under the age of 18, 7.3% from 18 to 24, 27.2% from 25 to 44, 28.8% from 45 to 64, and 7.7% 65 or older. The median age was 38 years. For every 100 females, there were 102.2 males. For every 100 females age 18 and over, there were 98.4 males.

The median household income was $58,764 and the median family income was $60,793. Males had a median income of $41,220 versus $31,011 for females. The per capita income for the CDP was $21,478. About 2.7% of families and 3.9% of the population were below the poverty line, including 3.6% of those under age 18 and 6.5% of those age 65 or over.

== Community ==
The Bonadelle Ranchos-Madera Ranchos community is considered rural. There are two different areas in the Bonadelle Ranchos-Madera Ranchos. The first area is Madera Ranchos, which is considered the business and urban area of the community. The community is roughly 6.5 miles (10.5 km) in length from Kensington Drive north to Highway 145. There are three gas stations, as well as the Madera Ranchos Market, a primary shopping location and business for the local populations. A local library, daycare and several other small shops and stores are also present in the community. Recently the Madera Ranchos has added a Dollar General. Homes in the area are generally on 1/2-1 acre, and are on a local community well. The second area is Bonadelle Ranchos, which extends roughly from Avenue 13 north to Highway 145. This is the most rural part of the community. The majority of the homes in this area are on 2+ acres, and all have their own wells for water. The Bonadelle 9 Volunteer Fire Station is located in this area and serves as the main fire fighting force in the community.

== Government ==
In the California State Legislature, the two communities are in the 4th senatorial district, represented by Republican Marie Alvarado-Gil, and the 8th Assembly district, represented by Republican David Tangipa.

In the United States House of Representatives, Bondadelle and Madera Ranchos are in California's 13th congressional district, represented by Democrat Adam Gray as of January 2025.
