= Rolling Hills, Madera County, California =

Rolling Hills
- Census-designated place
- Location within California Location within the United States
- Coordinates: 36°54′12″N 119°47′52″W
- Country: United States
- State: California
- County: Madera

Area
  - Total: 0.601 sq mi (1.56 km^{2})
  - Land: 0.601 sq mi (1.56 km^{2})
  - Water: 0 sq mi (0 km^{2})
- Elevation: 371 ft (113 m)

Population (2020)
  - Total: 793
  - Density: 1,320/sq mi (509/km^{2})
- Time zone: UTC-8 (Pacific (PST))
  - Summer (DST): UTC-7 (PDT)
- ZIP Code: 93636 (Madera)
- GNIS feature IDs: 1812811; 2628784
- FIPS code: 06-62625

Rolling Hills is an unincorporated community and census-designated place (CDP) in Madera County, California, United States, north of Fresno on State Route 41 (Yosemite Freeway). It lies at an elevation of 371 feet (113 m). The population was 793 at the 2020 census.

== Geography ==
Rolling Hills is located just north of the Madera County–Fresno County line, on the west side of State Route 41, 12 miles (19 km) north of Fresno. The city of Madera is 18 miles (29 km) to the northwest. According to the United States Census Bureau, the Rolling Hills CDP has a total area of 0.6 square miles (1.6 km^{2}), all land.

== Demographics ==
The 2020 United States census reported that Rolling Hills had a population of 793. The population density was 1,319.5 inhabitants per square mile (509.5/km^{2}). The racial makeup of Rolling Hills was 583 (73.5%) White, 11 (1.4%) African American, 5 (0.6%) Native American, 17 (2.1%) Asian, 2 (0.3%) Pacific Islander, 67 (8.4%) from other races, and 108 (13.6%) from two or more races. Hispanic or Latino of any race were 185 persons (23.3%).

The census reported that 792 people (99.9% of the population) lived in households and 1 (0.1%) was institutionalized.

There were 296 households, out of which 91 (30.7%) had children under the age of 18 living in them, 205 (69.3%) were married-couple households, 14 (4.7%) were cohabiting couple households, 46 (15.5%) had a female householder with no partner present, and 31 (10.5%) had a male householder with no partner present. 40 households (13.5%) were one person, and 29 (9.8%) were one person aged 65 or older. The average household size was 2.68. There were 244 families (82.4% of all households).

The age distribution was 141 people (17.8%) under the age of 18, 58 people (7.3%) aged 18 to 24, 177 people (22.3%) aged 25 to 44, 175 people (22.1%) aged 45 to 64, and 242 people (30.5%) who were 65 years of age or older. The median age was 46.8 years. For every 100 females, there were 98.7 males.

There were 301 housing units at an average density of 500.8 units per square mile (193.4 units/km^{2}), of which 296 (98.3%) were occupied. Of these, 276 (93.2%) were owner-occupied, and 20 (6.8%) were occupied by renters.
