= Hills Church =

Bayside El Dorado Hills
- Bayside El Dorado Hills (formerly Rolling Hills Church 1995-2021 and Hills Church 2021-2025)
- Bayside El Dorado Hills
- 38.64085°N 121.07314°W
- Location: 800 White Rock Road, El Dorado Hills, CA 95762
- Country: United States
- Denomination: Non-Denominational
- Website: hills.church

History
- Founded: 1995
- Founder: Jeff Bigelow

Bayside El Dorado Hills (formerly Rolling Hills Christian Church and Hills Church) is a non-denominational, Evangelical Christian church in El Dorado Hills, California.

The church was founded on Easter, 1995 by Jeff Bigelow. Bigelow retired in 2012 and Bill Search was brought in as the next senior pastor. In 2015, the church had 2,000 members.At the beginning of 2016, Rolling Hills split ways with Search, bringing back pastor Jeff Bigelow until 2017, when Jonathan Hansen became the senior pastor. After the departure of Jonathan Hansen in 2024, the church began looking in a new direction, this time to merge with a larger church in the area. In 2025 the church merged with Bayside and became Bayside El Dorado Hills. Along with the addition as Micheal Metcalf as the new senior pastor.
