= Kettleman =

Kettleman may refer to:

- Kettleman City, California
- Kettleman Hills
- Kettleman North Dome Oil Field
- Betsy and Craig Kettleman, fictional characters in Better Call Saul
- Kettleman Hills Hazardous Waste Facility
- Kettleman's Bagel Co.

== See also ==
- Kittleman (disambiguation)
