= Madera County Connection =

Transportation in California, United States

- Parent: Madera County Department of Public Works
- Founded: 1997
- Headquarters: 201 W Almond Ave
- Locale: Madera, CA
- Service type: Bus service, Dial-a-Ride
- Routes: 4
- Destinations: Chowchilla; Coarsegold; Eastin-Arcola; Fairmead; La Vina; Madera; Oakhurst; Ripperdan
- Hubs: Downtown Madera Intermodal Center
- Annual ridership: 18,598 (2021)
- Website: Official website

Madera County Connection (MCC) is the primary bus agency providing intercity services within Madera County, California. It is operated by the County Department of Public Works and offers four fixed routes connecting the cities of Chowchilla and Madera with Valley Children's Hospital and smaller unincorporated communities in the county. All four routes meet at the same intermodal terminal in downtown Madera, where riders may transfer to Madera Metro intracity buses or Greyhound Lines intercity buses. Passengers may take Madera Metro to the train station and transfer to the Amtrak Gold Runner intercity service connecting the San Francisco Bay Area and Los Angeles.

Madera County also is responsible for operating dial-a-ride point-to-point services in the unincorporated areas surrounding Madera and Chowchilla (MCC Madera and Chowchilla Dial-A-Ride, respectively), a demand-responsive bus for seniors in the rural eastern part of the county (Eastern Madera County Senior Bus), and a medical escort program (Eastern Madera County Medical Escort Service).

== History ==
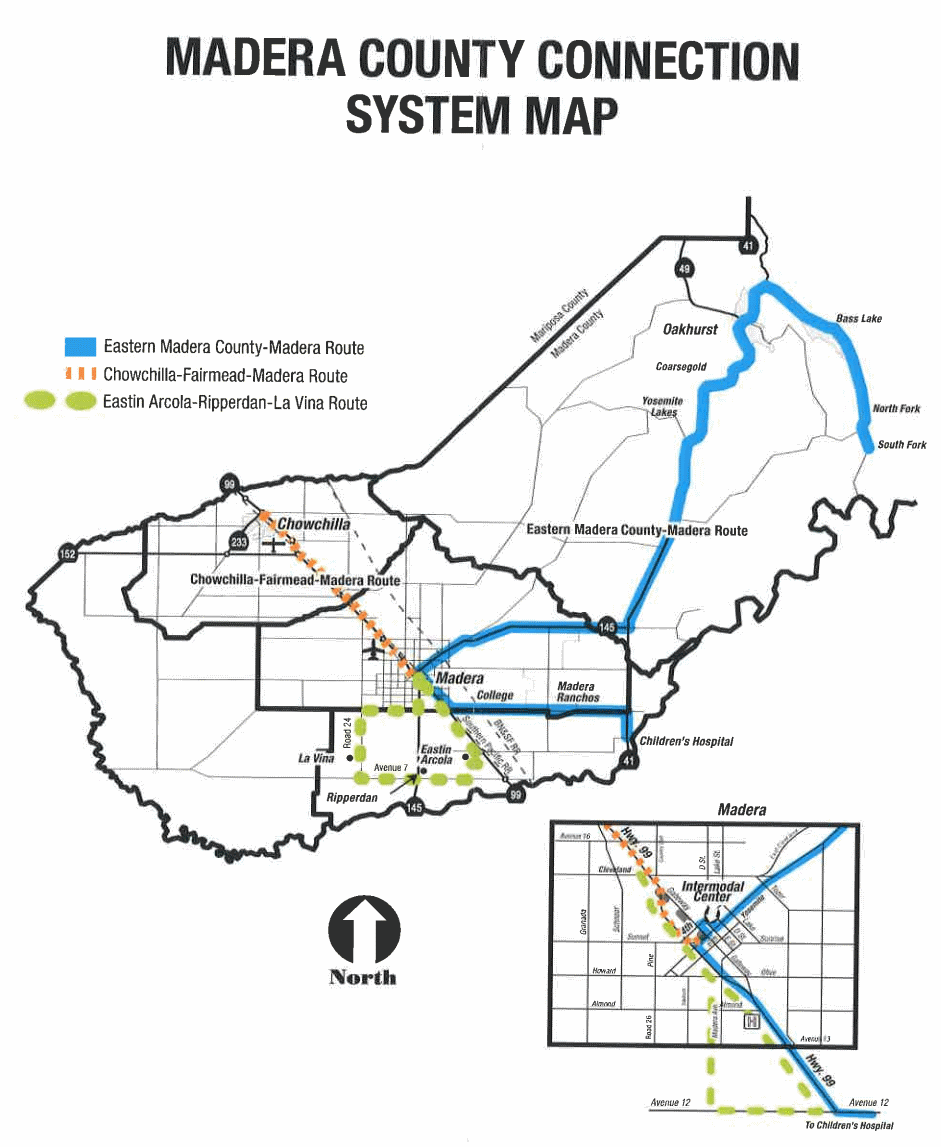
System map (2022)

Madera County Connection started in 2001 as a demonstration service, providing transportation for children and their families to and from Children's Hospital Central California.

Madera County let a five-year contract to the Fresno Economic Opportunities Commission (EOC) in 2019 to operate county bus services, including MCC. Prior to that, separate contracts were held by Merced Transportation Company for MCC and the Community Action Partnership of Madera County for the Senior Bus and Escort Program.

== Services ==
MCC operates its fixed routes on weekdays, with no service provided on specific holidays (New Year's Day, Memorial Day, July 4, Labor Day, Thanksgiving, and Christmas).

=== Fixed routes ===
All fixed routes originate and terminate at the Madera Intermodal Center in downtown Madera, at the intersection of E Yosemite Avenue and N E Street.

Madera County Connection fixed routes
No.	Route name	Destinations served	Days	Trips/day	Notes / Refs.
1	College / Children's Hospital	Madera Community College, Madera Ranchos Market, Valley Children's Hospital	Mon–Fri	5	With the exception of the first and last trips, operates as an extension of Route 4 (Eastern Madera). Route takes approximately 90 minutes roundtrip.
2	Eastin Arcola - Ripperdan - La Vina	Eastin Arcola, Ripperdan, La Vina	Mon, Wed, Fri	2	Serves communities west of California State Route 99 and south of Madera; typical round-trip time is 60 minutes.
3	Chowchilla - Fairmead	Fairmead, Countrywood Shopping Center, Chowchilla	Mon–Fri	5	Largely follows SR 99; typical round-trip time is 90 minutes.
4	Eastern Madera County	Yosemite Lakes, Coarsegold, Oakhurst, Bass Lake, North Fork, South Fork	Mon–Fri	5	With the exception of the last two trips, continues as Route 1 (College / Children's Hospital). Largely follows SR 145 and SR 41; typical round-trip time is 240 minutes.

=== Fares ===
One-way fares are $2 per passenger; children under 5 ride free with a paid adult fare.

=== Transfers ===
Riders may transfer to Fresno Area Express at Valley Children's Hospital for free, or to Madera Metro or Greyhound Lines at the Madera Intermodal Center. In addition, riders on the Eastern County route may transfer to Yosemite Area Regional Transportation System, which offers seasonal service to Yosemite National Park at stops along California State Route 41 in Coarsegold and Oakhurst. The Madera Amtrak station is approximately 5 mi (8.0 km) north of the Intermodal Center and requires a transfer to Madera Metro.

== Fleet & facilities ==
Madera County has thirteen vehicles used for its transit services, of which nine are used by MCC; all nine are lift-equipped Starcraft Allstar 25 van cutaway buses with seating capacity of 15 passengers + 2 wheelchair users.

Before 2019, the administrative office for MCC was at 1200 Maple Street; Madera County renovated an office space at the County Road Yard in Madera at 201 W. Almond Avenue and the contracted operator moved operations and maintenance activities to that location.
