= Kettleman North Dome Oil Field =

Oil and gas field in Kings and Fresno counties, California, USA

Coordinates: 36.0402°N 120.0960°W

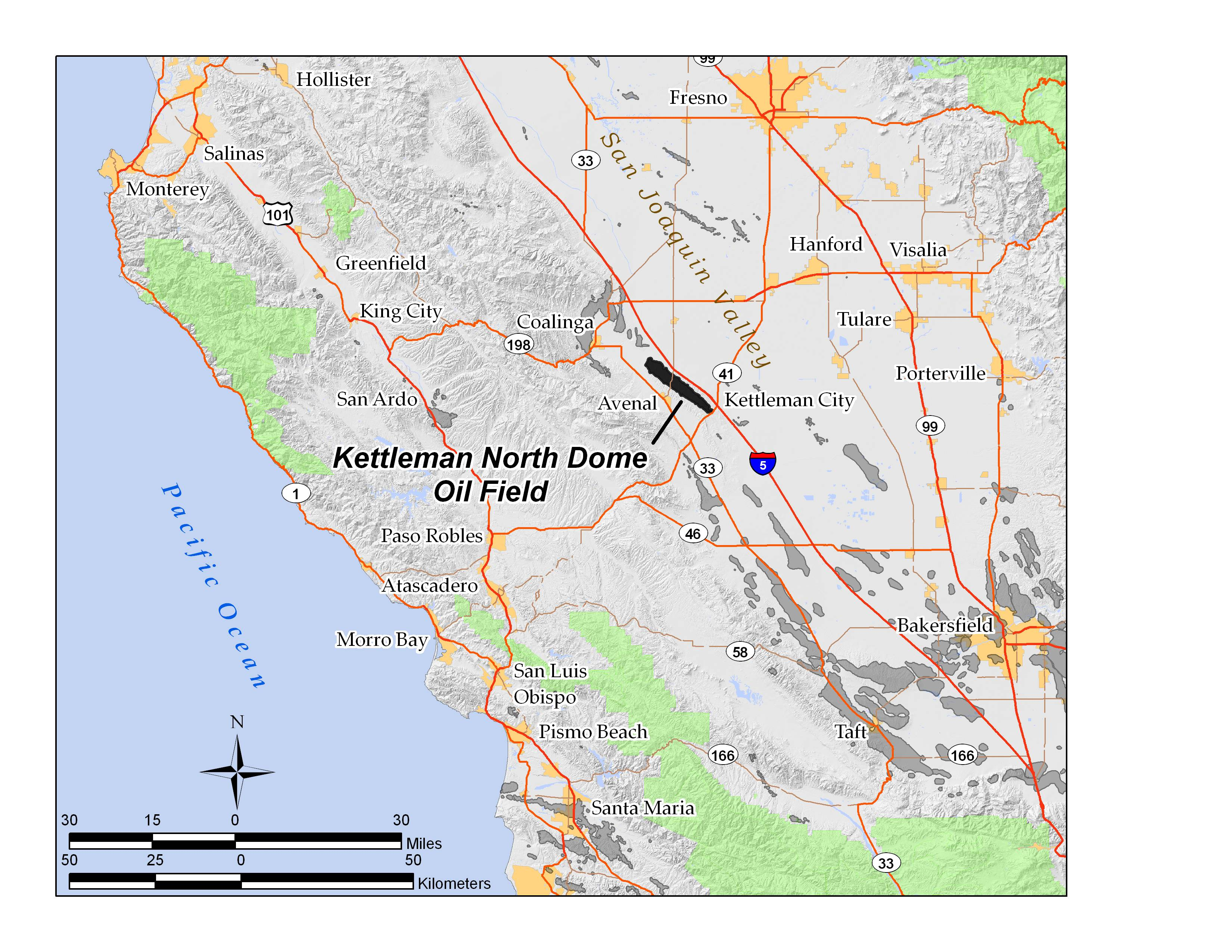
The Kettleman North Dome Oil Field in Central California. Other oil fields are shown in gray.

The Kettleman North Dome Oil Field is a large oil and gas field in Kings and Fresno counties, California. Discovered in 1928, it is the fifteenth largest field in the state by total ultimate oil recovery, and of the top twenty oil fields, it is the closest to exhaustion, with less than one-half of one percent of its original oil remaining in place.

== Setting ==
The Kettleman North Dome occupies the northernmost portion of the Kettleman Hills, a northwest-southeast trending line of hills about 30 miles (48 km) long which parallels the San Andreas Fault to the west. The range consists of two elongate "domes", the North Dome and Middle Dome; a portion of the Middle Dome is sometimes called the "South Dome", although the North and Middle Dome are the most topographically distinct. Both the North and Middle Domes overlie oil fields.

The Kettleman Hills is named, and misspelled, after Dave Kettelman, a pioneer sheep and cattle rancher who grazed his animals there in the 1860s. The hills, which rise to an elevation of approximately 1,200 feet (370 m), divide the San Joaquin Valley on the east from the much smaller Kettleman Plain to the west. They are discontinuous, as indicated by their name ("hills" rather than "ridge"). The predominant vegetation is grassland, with surrounding areas containing grassland, low scrub, orchards, and agricultural fields. The climate is arid, with 6 to 12 inches (300 mm) of precipitation per year on the average, all falling as rain. Summers are hot, with daily highs regularly exceeding 100 °F (38 °C) in the summer months, and winters are cool with occasional freezes.

Interstate 5 parallels the range of hills to the northeast, and SR 33 to the southwest. SR 41, which runs from Paso Robles to Kettleman City to Fresno, crosses the hills at the southern extremity of the North Dome, and SR 269, which connects the town of Avenal to Interstate 5, crosses the hills in the middle of the North Dome.

North Dome itself is one of the longest of the California oil fields; only Midway-Sunset is longer. Its long axis, northwest to southeast, is approximately 14 miles (23 km), and it is almost three miles (5 km) across at its widest point.

== Geology ==
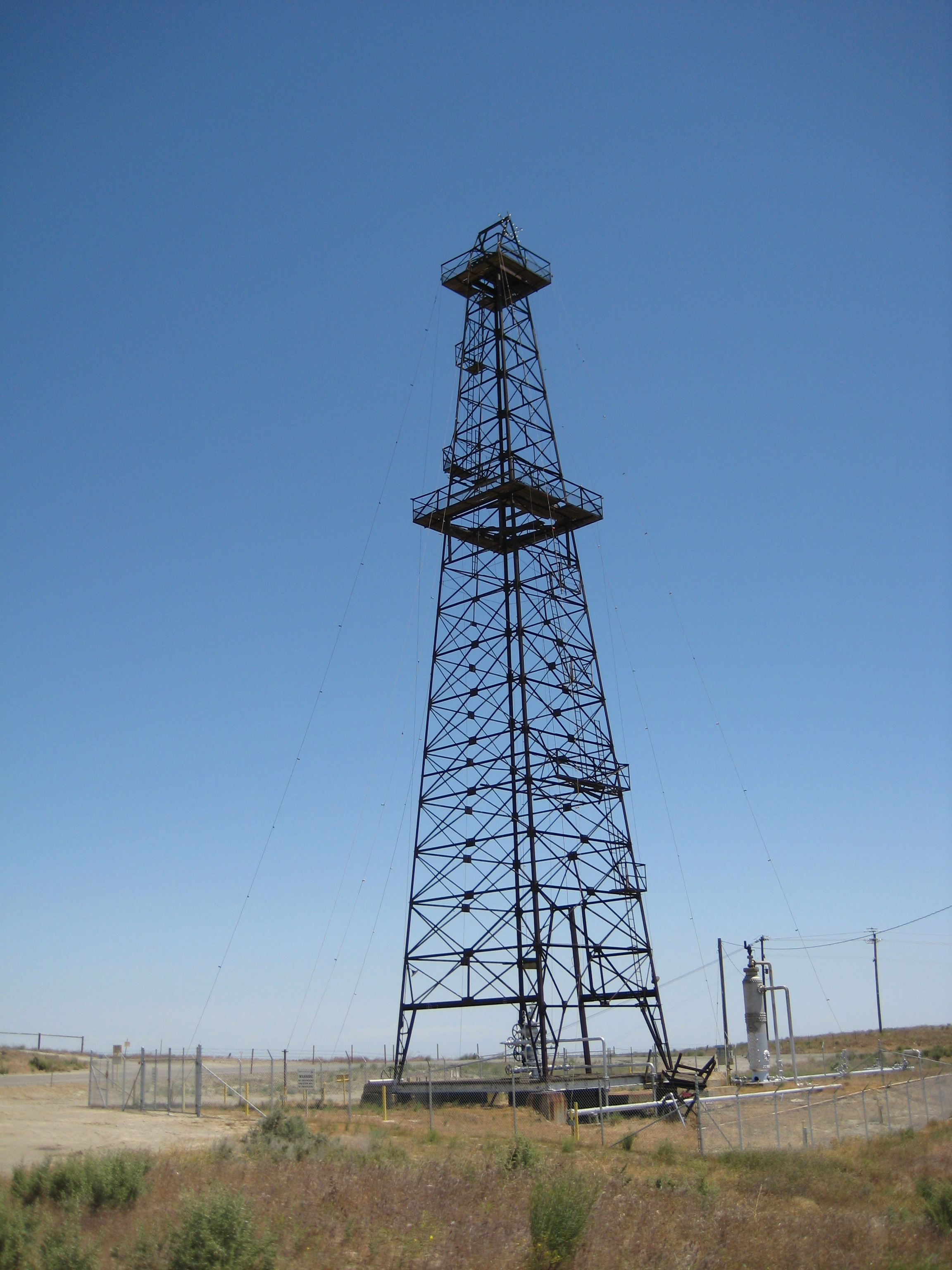
Old Oil Well Derrick in the Kettleman North Dome Oil Field near Avenal

The oil field is one of a long line of similar lengthy, narrow, anticlinal fields paralleling the San Andreas Fault, where tectonic forces squeezed the rock formations into anticlinal structures, trapping large quantities of petroleum. To the northwest is the large Coalinga Oil Field; to the southeast are the Lost Hills Oil Field, Cymric, McKittrick, North Belridge, South Belridge, Elk Hills, Buena Vista, and finally the largest of all, the enormous Midway-Sunset field in the southwestern corner of the San Joaquin Valley. The total productive area of the Kettleman Hills North Dome is 13,700 acres (55 km^{2}).

Within the Kettleman Hills, oil is found in the large structural trap formed by the anticline. The large McLure Formation, of upper Miocene age, forms the impermeable cap beneath which enormous quantities of oil have pooled over millions of years, principally in the Temblor Formation, which is of Middle and Lower Miocene age. Within that formation, five different zones are identified in cross section, with a total thickness of petroleum-bearing rock approaching 2,000 feet (610 m). Underneath the Temblor is yet another series of impermeable and permeable strata, like layers of a cake: the Vaqueros Sandstone and Kreyenhagen Formation are impermeable units beneath the Temblor; underneath them, another large pool of oil is found in the Upper McAdams Formation (of Eocene age) at a depth of around 10,000 feet (3,000 m). This formation was not discovered until 1940. A few other smaller oil pools were found later, such as one in the Kreyenhagen in 1957 and the Whepley, a small additional pool at great depth in the Temblor Formation, discovered in 1976. While the Kreyenhagen is normally an impermeable shale, where it is highly fractured it is a productive unit in its own right, since oil collects in the fractures.

Removal of oil from the large Kettleman Hills fields, mainly the North Dome, has been suggested as a cause of the 1985 M6.1 earthquake, since the total deformation caused by the quake was exactly that necessary to compensate for the oil removed historically, i.e. by filling the vacated space. The same mechanism has been suggested for the 1983 Coalinga earthquake and the 1987 Whittier Narrows earthquake, both of which occurred near the centers of mature oil fields.

== History, production, and operations ==
The presence of a large oil field was long suspected in the Kettleman Hills region, since it is an anticlinal structure like so many of the nearby San Joaquin Valley oil fields; however, early test wells found nothing, since drilling methods then lacked the ability to reach the 7,000 feet (2,100 m) necessary to tap the reservoirs. Before 1910, drillers made nine separate unsuccessful attempts to reach oil.

A persistent attempt paid off in 1927, when the Milham Company drilled its Elliott No. 1 well: after 19 months of labor, in October 1928, at a depth of 7,108 feet (2,167 m), oil was found, and a terrific blowout ensued, which took three years to bring under control. Elliott No. 1 and other wells in the huge Temblor pool produced 3,670 barrels a day during that period; the initial measured pressure was 3,540 psi (24,400 kPa). The town of Avenal, originally named Milham City after the oil company, quickly grew near the field, the latest in a series of oil boom towns in the California Central Valley. Other oil drillers active at Kettlemen include Fred M. Manning.

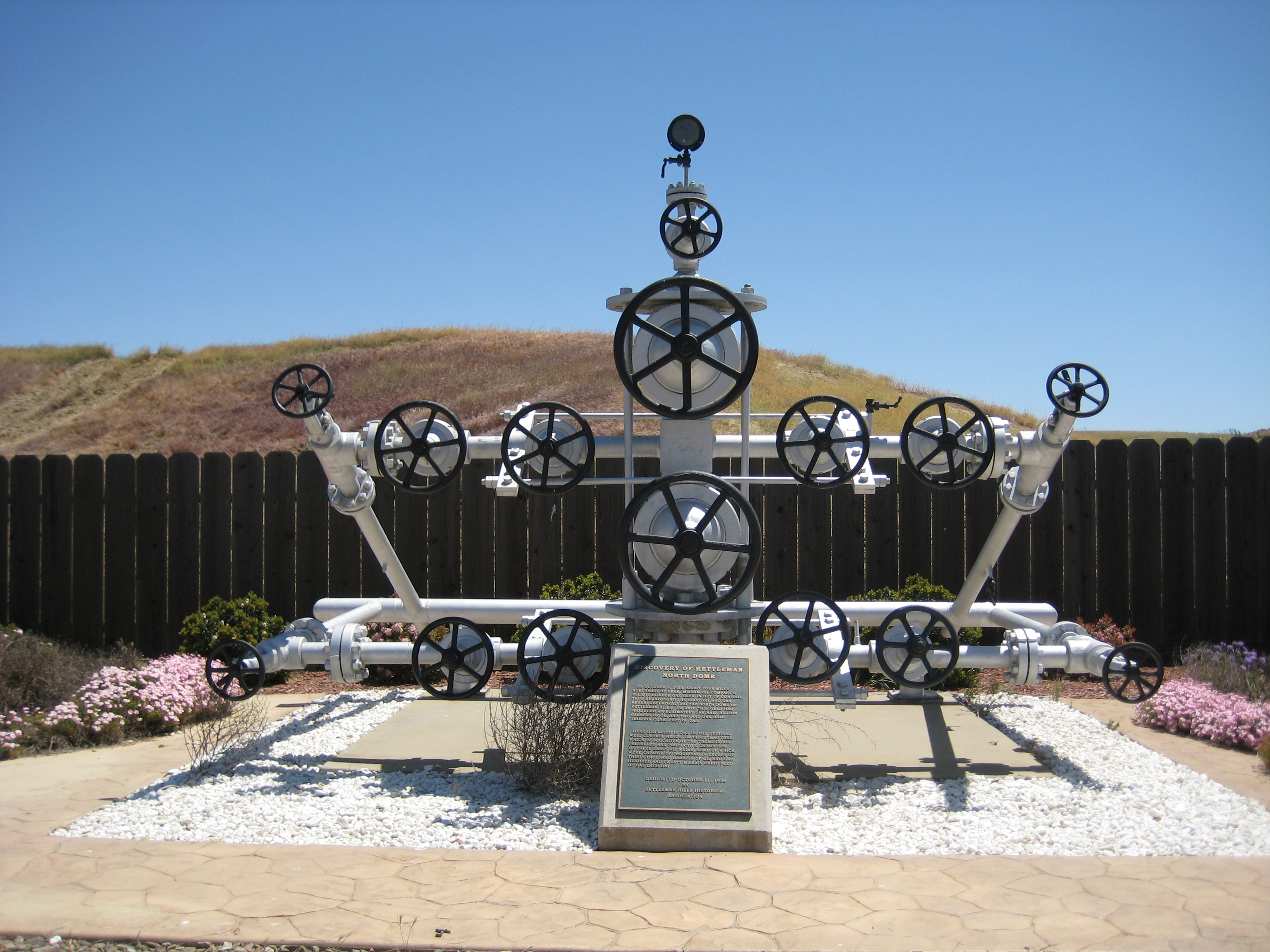
Monument to the Discovery of the Kettleman North Dome Oil Field in 1928

Unrestricted production of oil at the Kettleman Hills fields, mainly North Dome, was controversial during the 1930s. Other states, such as Oklahoma, Texas, and Kansas, restricted production of oil through agreements with each other, in order to keep the price from falling too far; however, in California no such regulation existed. Overproduction from Kettleman, with its depressant effect on the price of oil, was a cause of considerable antagonism in the oil industry at the time. Production from Kettleman peaked in 1936, with over 29 million barrels pumped during that year, making it one of the most productive fields in the United States. In 2006, the latest year for which data was available, production was a mere 128,000 barrels, even with the modern technologies available.

Unlike many of the other major California oil fields, enhanced recovery methods have been used minimally at Kettleman Hills. Water flooding was used in both the Temblor and Vaqueros pools, between 1965 and 1977, but many of the enhanced recovery methods used successfully at other oil fields – steam flooding, fire flooding, gas injection, and so forth, which were so successful at Kern River, San Ardo, Midway-Sunset and elsewhere – have proved impractical because of the oil's relatively light API gravity and its depth.

J.P. Oil Company, Inc., of Lafayette, Louisiana, took over operation of the entire Kettleman Hills North Dome Oil Field in 1997, but as of 2008 the oil field is run by Chevron Corporation.

== In literature and film ==
Boom Town, a 1940 film about wildcatting in the early Oklahoma oil industry, starred Clark Gable and Spencer Tracy. The film ends with the Gable and Tracy characters preparing to be the first oil men to drill on the Kettleman Dome.

Wildcatting: The Hills of Kettleman by Eloise Sterling Hirt, Theodore Kesler Sterling, et al., is a novel about the discovery of oil in Kettleman Hills. One of the characters, "Bernie Bernard", is probably based on oilman Bernard H. "Bernie" Scott, one of the three geologists who discovered the field.
