= Madera Metro =

Transportation in California, United States

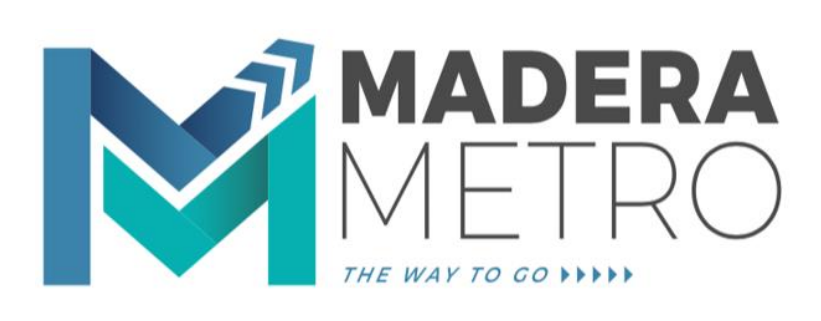
- Parent: City of Madera
- Founded: 1998
- Headquarters: 1951 Independence Dr
- Locale: Madera, CA
- Service type: Bus service, Dial-a-Ride
- Routes: 3
- Hubs: Walmart, P & Yosemite
- Annual ridership: 60,079 (2021)
- Website: Official website

Madera Metro, formerly Madera Area Express (MAX) is the primary bus agency providing intracity services within Madera, California. It is operated by the City of Madera and offers three fixed routes and dial-a-ride point-to-point services. Riders may transfer to Madera County Connection intercity bus routes within the county or Greyhound Lines long-haul intercity buses at the downtown Madera Intermodal Center. Madera Metro also connects to the train station north of the city limits, where riders may transfer to the Amtrak Gold Runner intercity service connecting the San Francisco Bay Area and Los Angeles.

== History ==
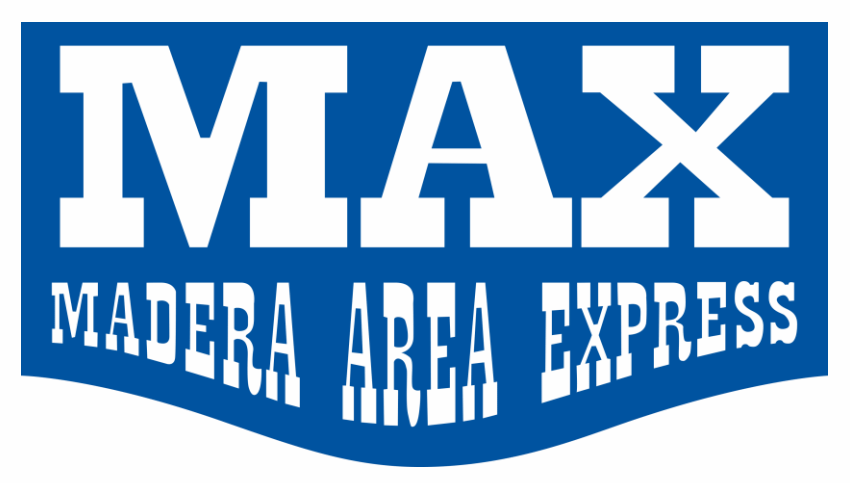
MAX logo (1998–2019)

The first public transportation service in the city of Madera was Madera Dial-A-Ride, which began operations in 1978, as the result of lobbying by senior citizens starting in the mid-70s. Eventually, a fixed-route service was started in 1998 as Madera Area Express.

The city began a rebranding project for MAX in June 2017; a US$60,000 grant was awarded in 2018, which was partially used to hire the Jeffrey Scott Agency to develop a new name, logo, and outreach campaign with community input. The present Madera Metro name and logo were unveiled that October along with the strapline ("The Way to Go"), and continued to be refined, considering alternatives, through 2019. MV Transportation was contracted in 2018 to provide transit operations and maintenance, and the city opened a new Madera Transit Center in the Freedom Industrial Park west of Madera South High School in 2020, where dispatch, storage, and maintenance will be performed.

In fall 2022, Madera Metro adopted the Madera Transit Plan, which proposes four shorter fixed routes, enabling more frequent service, more evenly spaced stops, and lower headways. In addition, the existing main transfer point will shift to the downtown Madera Intermodal Center, which facilitates connections to Madera County Connection and Greyhound buses. A secondary transfer point will be set up at the Walmart parking lot near Cleveland and SR 99 Planned implementation of the Transit Plan is scheduled for April 2023.

== Services ==
System map (2022)

Madera Metro operates its fixed routes on weekdays and Saturdays, with no service provided on specific holidays (New Year's Day, July 4, Thanksgiving, and Christmas) and modified service on other selected holidays.

=== Fixed routes ===
All fixed routes stop at the "P" Street Transfer station, at the intersection of Yosemite and P. Two routes stop at the Madera Intermodal Center in downtown Madera, at the intersection of E Yosemite Avenue and N E Street. Routes also share stops at the Madera Walmart (near Cleveland and SR 99), Madera South High School, and Madera Community Hospital.

Madera Metro fixed routes
No.	Name	Terminus	via (Destinations)	Terminus	Days	Typ. headways (min.)	Notes / Refs.
1	Pink	Walmart / Walgreens (Cleveland & SR 99)	Cleveland, Yosemite, Olive, Tozer, and Almond (Intermodal Center, P & Yosemite, Madera South High School)	Madera Community Hospital	Mon–Sat	30	Serves primarily eastern & southeastern neighborhoods; typical round-trip time is 105 minutes.
2	Blue	Walmart / Walgreens (Cleveland & SR 99)	Granada, Stadium, Pecan, Tozer & Olive (Intermodal Center, P & Yosemite, Madera South High School)	Madera Community Hospital	Mon–Sat	60	Serves primarily western & southeastern neighborhoods; typical round-trip time is 60 minutes.
3	College	Walmart / Walgreens (Cleveland & SR 99)	Schnoor, Howard, Stadium, & Pecan (P & Yosemite, Madera South High School)	Madera Community College	Mon–Fri	60	Typical round-trip time is 60 minutes.

=== Fares ===
One-way fixed-route fares have been waived since April 15, 2020 due to the COVID-19 pandemic in California.

=== Transfers ===
Riders may transfer to Madera County Connection or Greyhound Lines at the Madera Intermodal Center.

The Madera Amtrak station is approximately 5 mi (8.0 km) north of the Intermodal Center and will be served by Madera Metro under the Madera Transit Plan starting in April 2023.

== Fleet & facilities ==
Madera Metro uses mostly van cutaway buses with seating capacities ranging from 17 to 27.

The Madera Transit Center is the main operations and maintenance facility for Madera Metro. All three routes meet at the current main transfer point, which is at the intersection of P Street and Yosemite Avenue near downtown Madera. When the Madera Transit Plan is implemented, the main transfer point will shift approximately 1.3 km (0.81 mi) northeast to the Madera Intermodal Center, at the intersection of E and Yosemite.
