= Millham City, California =

Millham City
- Former settlement
- Location in California
- Coordinates: 36°02′15″N 119°59′57″W
- Country: United States
- State: California
- County: Kings
- Elevation: 344 ft (105 m)

Millham City is a former settlement in Kings County, California, United States. It was located 3 miles (4.8 km) northwest of Kettleman City, at an elevation of 344 feet (105 m). Millham City still appeared on maps as of 1937.
