= Five Points, California =

Unincorporated community in California, United States

Five Points
- Unincorporated community
- Location in California Five Points (the United States)
- Coordinates: 36°25′46″N 120°06′11″W
- Country: United States
- State: California
- County: Fresno
- Elevation: 223 ft (68 m)
- ZIP code: 93624
- Area code: 559

Five Points is an unincorporated community in Fresno County, California, United States. It is located 25 miles (40 km) northeast of Coalinga, at an elevation of 223 feet (68 m). Five Points marks the junction of California State Routes 145 and 269.

A post office opened at Five Points in 1944. In 1978, it was said that "you can see all of Five Points from any point in Five Points", and that the town had around 100 residents, a cafe, and a few food and machinery supply businesses. A few businesses remain as of 2025.
