= Kittleman =

Kittleman is a surname. Notable people with this name include:

- Allan H. Kittleman (born 1958), American politician from Maryland
- Robert H. Kittleman (1926–2004), American politician from Maryland
- Trent Kittleman (born 1945), American politician from Maryland

== See also ==
- Kettleman (disambiguation)
