= California State Route 145 =

Highway in California

State Route 145

- Map of central California with SR 145 highlighted in red

Route information
- Maintained by Caltrans
- Length: 67 mi (108 km)

Major junctions
- South end: I-5 / SR 33 near Coalinga
- SR 269 in Five Points; SR 180 in Kerman; SR 99 in Madera
- North end: SR 41 near Friant

Location
- Country: United States
- State: California
- Counties: Fresno, Madera

Highway system
- State highways in California; Interstate; US; State; Scenic; History; Pre‑1964; Unconstructed; Deleted; Freeways
← SR 144	→ SR 146

State Route 145 is a state highway in the U.S. state of California, running through the heart of the San Joaquin Valley from Interstate 5 near Coalinga north to Route 41 north of Fresno.

== Route description ==
Route 145 is defined in section 445, subdivision (a) of the California Streets and Highways Code:

Route 145 is from:
(1) Route 5 near Oilfields to Route 99 near Madera, passing near Five Points and Kerman.
(2) Route 99 near Madera to Route 41.

Subdivision (b) permits the state to relinquish control of the segment of the highway in Madera between Gateway Drive and Lake Street to the city.

SR 145 travels through the center of the San Joaquin Valley, remaining a rural two-lane road in its entirety. The southern terminus of SR 145 is at I-5 near Coalinga. SR 145 heads northeast as Fresno-Coalinga Road, turning north at the junction with SR 269 in Five Points, where it assumes the designation as Lassen Avenue. After passing through the town of Helm, SR 145 heads northeast as McMullin Grade, before turning north again as South Madera Avenue. SR 145 intersects with SR 180 in the city of Kerman, where it continues north to cross into Madera County. After passing through Ripperdan, SR 145 intersects SR 99 in Madera. From Madera, the route turns east, and ends at SR 41.

Various crops such as cotton, table grapes, tomatoes and melons are grown along the route in one of the most productive agricultural areas in the world.

SR 145 is part of the California Freeway and Expressway System, and near SR 99 is part of the National Highway System, a network of highways that are considered essential to the country's economy, defense, and mobility by the Federal Highway Administration.

== Major intersections ==
Except where prefixed with a letter, postmiles were measured on the road as it was in 1964, based on the alignment that existed at the time, and do not necessarily reflect current mileage. Postmile prefixes include: R reflecting a realignment in the route since then, M indicating a second realignment, L referring to an overlap due to a correction or change, and T indicating postmiles classified as temporary. Segments that remain unconstructed or have been relinquished to local control may be omitted. The numbers reset at county lines; the start and end postmiles in each county are given in the county column.

County	Location	Postmile	Destinations	Notes
Fresno; FRE 0.00-R41.28		0.00	SR 33 south (Fresno-Coalinga Road) – Coalinga	Continuation beyond I-5
Fresno; FRE 0.00-R41.28		0.00	I-5 / SR 33 north (West Side Freeway) – Sacramento, Los Angeles, Mendota	Interchange; south end of SR 145; I-5 exit 337
Fresno; FRE 0.00-R41.28	Five Points	13.21	SR 269 south (Lassen Avenue) / Mount Whitney Avenue – Huron, Avenal, Riverdale	Northern terminus of SR 269
Fresno; FRE 0.00-R41.28		17.27	Elkhorn Avenue – Burrel	
Fresno; FRE 0.00-R41.28		20.65	Colorado Avenue – San Joaquin, Tranquillity	
Fresno; FRE 0.00-R41.28		26.09	Manning Avenue – San Joaquin	
Fresno; FRE 0.00-R41.28	Kerman	35.15	SR 180 (Whitesbridge Road) – Fresno, Mendota	
Fresno; FRE 0.00-R41.28		40.17	Shaw Avenue – Biola	
Madera; MAD 0.00-25.46		7.06	Avenue 12	
Madera; MAD 0.00-25.46	Madera	9.08	SR 99 – Sacramento, Fresno	Interchange; SR 99 exit 153B
Madera; MAD 0.00-25.46	Madera	9.32	SR 99 Bus. south (Gateway Drive south) to SR 99 south – Fresno	South end of SR 99 Bus. overlap; former US 99 south
Madera; MAD 0.00-25.46	Madera	9.68	Gateway Drive north (SR 99 Bus. north), Yosemite Avenue	North end of SR 99 Bus. overlap; former US 99 north
Madera; MAD 0.00-25.46	Madera	11.02	Cleveland Avenue, Tozer Street	
Madera; MAD 0.00-25.46		25.46	SR 41 – Oakhurst, Yosemite, Fresno	North end of SR 145
Madera; MAD 0.00-25.46		25.46	Road 145 – Millerton Lake	Continuation beyond SR 41
1.000 mi = 1.609 km; 1.000 km = 0.621 mi: Concurrency terminus
