= California State Route 269 =

Highway in California

State Route 269
- SR 269 highlighted in red

Route information
- Maintained by Caltrans
- Length: 30 mi (48 km)

Major junctions
- South end: SR 33 in Avenal
- I-5 north of Avenal; SR 198 north of Huron
- North end: SR 145 in Five Points

Location
- Country: United States
- State: California
- Counties: Kings, Fresno

Highway system
- State highways in California; Interstate; US; State; Scenic; History; Pre‑1964; Unconstructed; Deleted; Freeways
← SR 267	→ SR 270

State Route 269 (SR 269) is a state highway in the U.S. state of California. It runs in the San Joaquin Valley from State Route 33 in Avenal to State Route 145 in the community of Five Points.

== Route description ==
Route 269 is defined in section 569 of the California Streets and Highways Code, and that the highway is "from Route 33 at Avenal to Route 145 near Five Points".

The southern terminus of SR 269 is at State Route 33 in Avenal. In the city of Avenal, it is known as Skyline Boulevard. It crosses the Kettleman Hills and drops into the San Joaquin Valley at I-5. From the Fresno-Kings county line, right before I-5 to its northern terminus at SR 145, the road is known as Lassen Avenue and heads due north through Huron.

SR 269 is not part of the National Highway System, a network of highways that are considered essential to the country's economy, defense, and mobility by the Federal Highway Administration.

== History ==
In 1959, Legislative Route number 269 was defined as "from LRN 61 to LRN 23 south of Palmdale." Today, this route is Angeles Forest Highway and Los Angeles County Route N3. The route was defined as a California State route in 1972, running from Avenal to Five Points.

== Major intersections ==
Except where prefixed with a letter, postmiles were measured on the road as it was when the route was established, based on the alignment that existed at the time, and do not necessarily reflect current mileage. Postmile prefixes include: R reflecting a realignment in the route since then, M indicating a second realignment, L referring to an overlap due to a correction or change, and T indicating postmiles classified as temporary. Segments that remain unconstructed or have been relinquished to local control may be omitted. The numbers reset at county lines; the start and end postmiles in each county are given in the county column.

County	Location	Postmile	Destinations	Notes
Kings; KIN 0.00-5.62	Avenal	0.00	SR 33 (Laneva Boulevard) – Coalinga, Taft	South end of SR 269
Fresno; FRE 0.00-24.76		0.43	I-5 (West Side Freeway) – Los Angeles, Sacramento	Interchange; I-5 exit 319
Fresno; FRE 0.00-24.76		12.75	SR 198 (Dorris Avenue) – Hanford, Coalinga	
Fresno; FRE 0.00-24.76	Five Points	24.76	SR 145 (Lassen Avenue) / Mount Whitney Avenue – Kerman, Fresno, Riverdale	North end of SR 269
1.000 mi = 1.609 km; 1.000 km = 0.621 mi
