= Wawona Tunnel =

Highway tunnel in Yosemite National Park, California, US

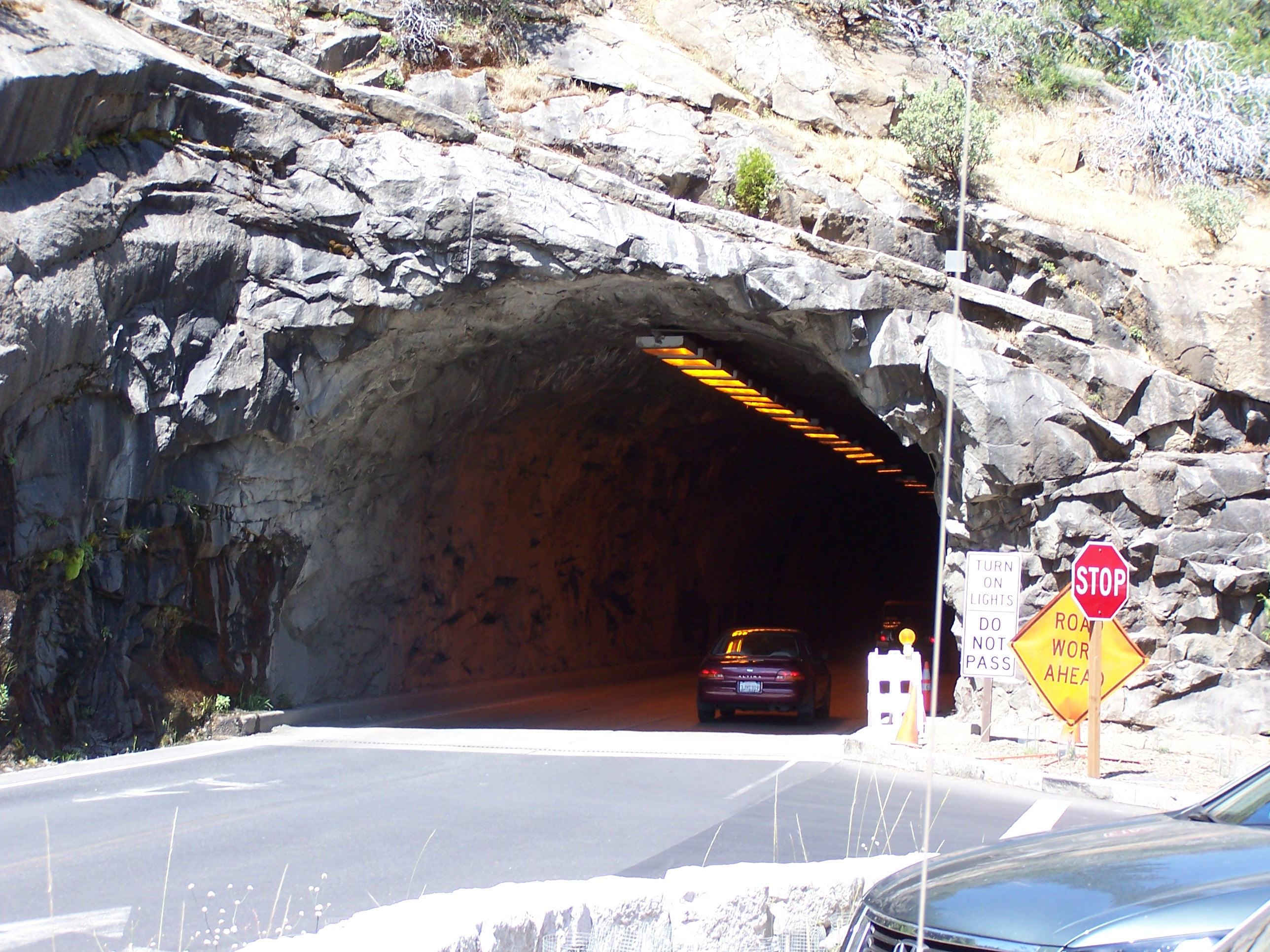
- The east end of the tunnel

Overview
- Location: Yosemite Valley, Yosemite National Park, Mariposa County, California, USA
- Coordinates: 37°42′57″N 119°41′09″W
- Route: SR 41

Operation
- Opened: 1933
- Owner: Caltrans

Technical
- Length: 4,233 feet (1,290 m)
- No. of lanes: two lanes total, one in each direction

The Wawona Tunnel is a highway tunnel in Yosemite National Park. It, and Tunnel View just beyond its east portal, were completed in 1933.

Wawona Tunnel is named after the community of Wawona but its name origin is not known. A popular story claims Wawō'na was the Miwok word for "big tree", or for "hoot of the owl", a bird considered the sequoia trees' spiritual guardian.

== Route ==
Wawona Tunnel was bored through solid granite bedrock, and carries Wawona Road through a granite mountain on the south side of the Merced River. It is located on one of the three main roads providing access to Yosemite Valley, the most visited section of the park. Wawona Road becomes California State Route 41 on exiting the park. After passing through the tunnel, when leaving Yosemite Valley, Wawona Road continues to Chinquapin Junction with Glacier Point Road to Badger Pass ski area & Glacier Point, and reaches an elevation of 6,039 feet (1,841 m) above sea level.

The completion of the tunnel shortened the trip to Yosemite by 40 miles (64 km) from Fresno and Southern California, compared to the All-Year Highway from Merced. The tunnel's construction was paired with major road upgrades, which expanded a narrow, often steep 12-foot stagecoach road into a 26-foot wide road. These improvements lowered the road's incline to a gentle 5% and softened sharp curves, making it better suited for automobile speeds. Additionally, the project rerouted the road away from old stagecoach relay stations like Fort Monroe.

== Specifications ==
When it opened in 1933, the Wawona Tunnel was the longest automobile tunnel in the world and remains the longest highway tunnel in California at 4,233 feet (1,290 m) long. The Tom Lantos Tunnels in Pacifica, California are 4,149 feet (1,265 m) .8 Miles long; the Caldecott Tunnel in Oakland, California is 3,771 feet (1,149 m) long. Both measured in their longest bores.

A $1.5 million federal highway contract to repair the tunnel's ventilation and electrical systems, and a separate contract to upgrade visitor services at Tunnel View, was completed in 2008.

== Scenery ==
The Wawona Tunnel features in a monochrome photograph by Ansel Adams: From Wawona Tunnel, Winter, Yosemite, about 1935.

== See also ==
- List of tunnels documented by the Historic American Engineering Record in California
- National Register of Historic Places listings in Yosemite National Park
- Tunnel View
