= Fred M. Manning =

American oil developer

Fred M. Manning (died 1958) was an American oil developer. Manning was born in Henrietta, Texas. He founded an oil drilling company in Fort Worth, Texas in 1925, and moved his family to Denver in 1930. Manning is credited with discovering the biggest oil field in Oklahoma, and, later in life, as founder of Coastal Drilling, Co. in California, of large finds in the Kettleman North Dome Oil Field.

At one point, the oil drilling operation run by Manning, father and son, was the third largest in the United States.

In 1948, Fred M. Manning became acquainted with Dwight D. Eisenhower during one of Eisenhower’s visits to the Doud family in Denver. The two men corresponded frequently over the next several years. In the early 1950s Manning moved to Rancho Santa Fe, California, where he died in October 1958. His wife Hazel continued to correspond with the Eisenhowers for several years thereafter.

== Robert L. Manning ==
His son, Robert L. Manning (b. March 5, 1923, in Duncan, Oklahoma, died 1999) served in World War II as a first lieutenant in the U.S. Army infantry. Robert Manning left two sons, Robert L. Manning Jr., of Denver, and John D. Manning of Cody, Wyoming; two daughters, Nancy M. Hill, of Denver, and Cathy M. Smith of Indian Wells, California.
