= Tunnel View =

Scenic overlook on SR-41 in Yosemite National Park

Coordinates: 37.71576°N 119.67718°W

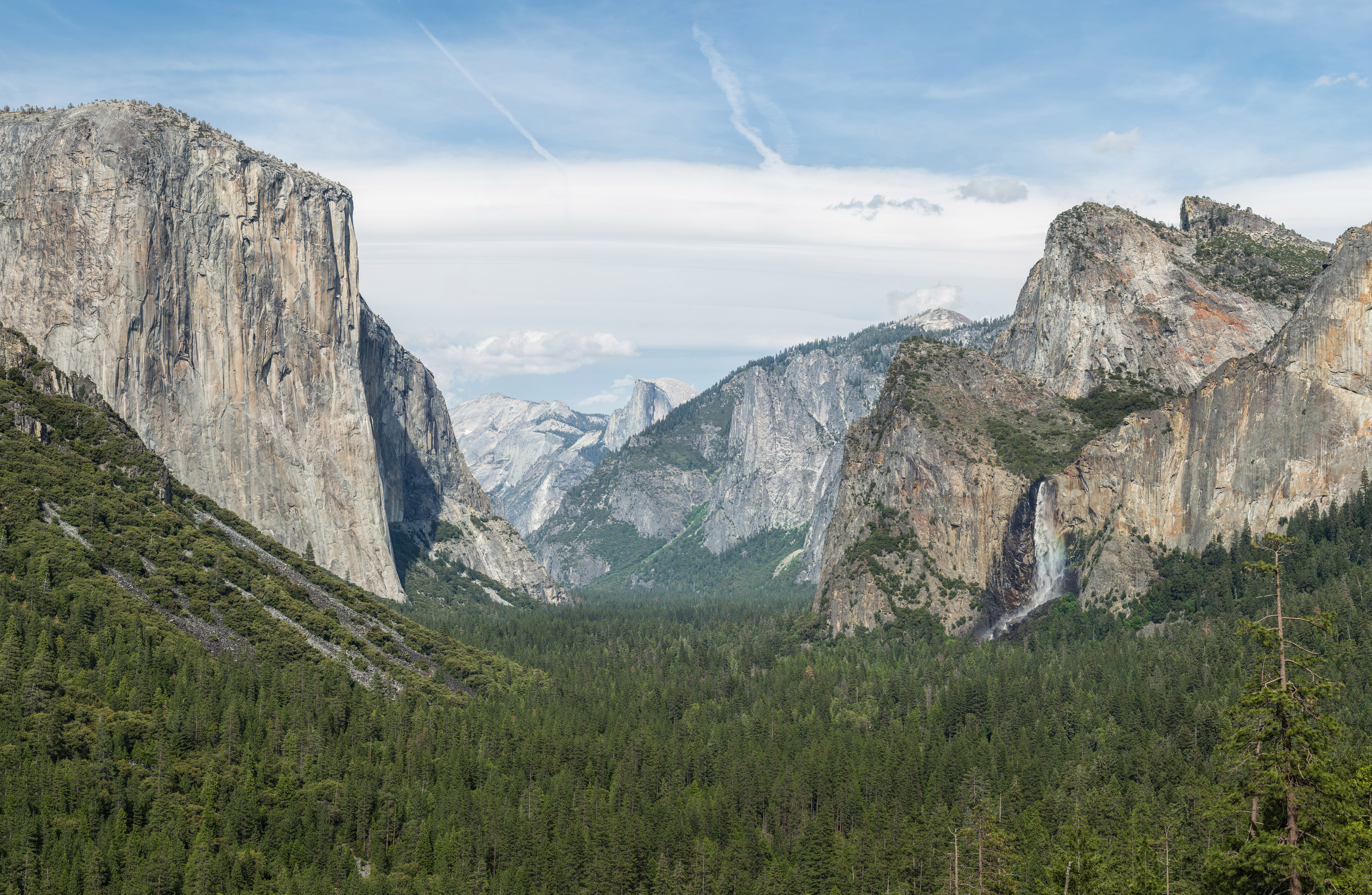
El Capitan, Half Dome, and Bridalveil Fall, from Tunnel View.

Tunnel View is a scenic viewpoint located on California State Route 41 in Yosemite National Park, United States. Since its opening in 1933, it has offered visitors iconic, expansive views of Yosemite Valley, making it one of the park's most renowned viewpoints.

The large viewpoint area is located directly east of the Wawona Tunnel portal, as one enters Yosemite Valley from points south. The view looks eastward into Yosemite Valley, and includes surrounding features, such as the southwest face of El Capitan on the left, Half Dome on axis, and Bridalveil Fall on the right.

For many arriving by road, this is the first view, upon suddenly exiting the tunnel, of Yosemite Valley and its setting. The trailhead, for the hiking trail up and south to Inspiration Point, is located here.

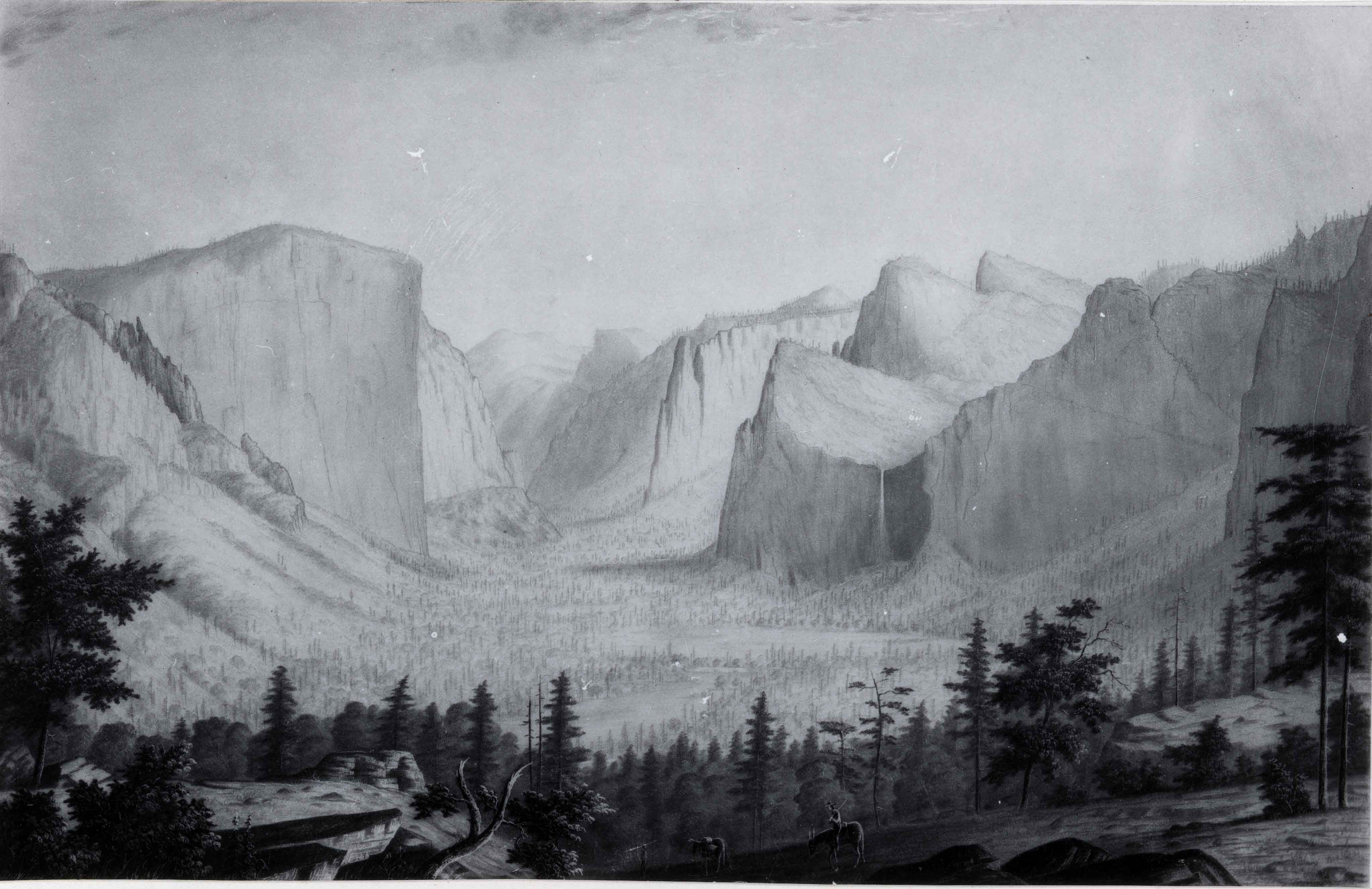
Earliest known drawing of Yosemite Valley, created near present day Tunnel View.

Wawona Tunnel’s east end lies less than 1,500 feet from Artist Point, where Thomas Ayres drew the first picture of Yosemite Valley in 1855.

== See also ==
- National Register of Historic Places listings in Yosemite National Park
