= Madera Community Hospital =

Geography
- Location: Madera, California, United States
- Coordinates: 36.9440°N 120.0448°W

Services
- Beds: 132

History
- Opened: 1971
- Closed: January 3, 2023; Reopened March 18, 2025

Links
- Website: www.maderahospital.org
- Lists: Hospitals in California

Madera Community Hospital is a not-for-profit community health resource and is not associated with any other hospital or health system. The hospital is locally governed by a board of trustees which provides governance and oversight. The board is composed of over a dozen community and business leaders. Madera Community Hospital was founded in 1971 and is located at 1250 E. Almond Avenue in Madera, California. The hospital contained 106 acute care beds, a 16-bed Emergency Department, and a 10-bed Intensive Care Unit. Madera Community Hospital also operates two rural health care clinics (Mendota and Chowchilla) and a home health agency (Family Health Services in Madera).

Madera Community Hospital is fully accredited by the American Osteopathic Association's Healthcare Facilities Accreditation Program (HFAP), by the Clinical Laboratory Improvement Act, 1988 (CLIA) program, and is a member of the Hospital Council of Northern and Central California and the California Healthcare Association.

The COVID-19 pandemic overwhelmed San Joaquin Valley hospitals. Already financially stressed, increasing costs for medical equipment and salaries for traveling nurses to address the surges were too much for the hospital to absorb. On January 3, 2023, Madera Community Hospital shuttered and filed for bankruptcy. American Advanced Management is currently working to reopen the facility.

== Effects of the Closure ==
Madera Community Hospital was the only hospital within a 30 mile radius, thus the closure caused 160,000 Madera residents to not have access to a local emergency room. Many people were faced with driving the 45 minutes to one of the neighboring towns or not receiving proper treatment. Unfortunately, this decision was already made for residents without access to a vehicle or public transportation. Other hospitals in the Central Valley were then stressed by the pressures of taking on all of the patients who would have previously been treated in Madera, which caused significant increases in emergency room wait times. Private ambulance companies from other counties pitched in to help take calls from Madera to transport residents to other hospitals such as Saint Agnes Medical Care (Fresno) and Community Regional Medical Center (Fresno). Not only were the patients redirected, 772 employees across the four locations were laid off when the hospital shuttered its doors.

== Timeline ==
After filing for bankruptcy, ownership of the hospital went up for bid, and there were two major corporations interested: Adventist Health with University of California San Francisco (UCSF) and American Advanced Management. During this time, a loan of 57 million dollars was approved for the reopening of the hospital from a state funded 300 million dollar bailout program for struggling hospitals in California. Ultimately, the bankruptcy court approved the bid from American Advanced Management in mid February 2024. The hospital reopened in March 2025.
