= Kettleman Hills =

Mountain range of the California Coast Ranges, in Kings County, California, USA

- Location within California

Highest point
- Elevation: 415 m (1,362 ft)

Geography
- Country: United States
- State: California
- District: Kings County
- Range coordinates: 36°0′13.836″N 120°3′25.489″W
- Topo map: USGS La Cima

The Kettleman Hills is a low mountain range of the interior California Coast Ranges, in western Kings County, California. It is a northwest–southeast trending line of hills about 30 miles long which parallels the San Andreas Fault to the west.

The Kettleman Hills are named (though misspelled) after Dave Kettelman, a pioneer sheep and cattle rancher who grazed his animals there in the 1860s. The hills, which rise to an elevation of approximately 1,200 ft (370 m), divide the San Joaquin Valley on the east from the much smaller Kettleman Plain to the west. They are the location of the Kettleman North Dome Oil Field.

The Kettleman Hills Hazardous Waste Facility, a large (1,600 acres (650 ha)) hazardous waste and municipal solid waste disposal facility operated by Waste Management, Inc., is located 3.5 mi (5.6 km) southwest of Kettleman City on State Route 41.
