= Ripperdan, California =

Unincorporated community in California, United States

Ripperdan
- Unincorporated community
- Location in California Ripperdan (the United States)
- Coordinates: 36°51′05″N 120°03′22″W
- Country: United States
- State: California
- County: Madera
- Elevation: 246 ft (75 m)

Ripperdan is an unincorporated community in Madera County, California, United States. The town was named for Abraham and Mahala Ripperdan, who settled in the area. However, in later years, the site became informally known as "Jap Corners" for the succession of Japanese-American business owners who operated a grocery store and a local farm labor center. Much of the town was destroyed in a fire in 1967.
