= Kettleman Hills Hazardous Waste Facility =

Hazardous waste and municipal solid waste disposal facility

Waste Management logo

The Kettleman Hills Hazardous Waste Facility is a large (1,600 acre; 4,000 hectare) hazardous waste and municipal solid waste disposal facility, operated by Waste Management, Inc. The landfill is located at , 3.5 mi (5.6 km) southwest of Kettleman City on State Route 41 in the western San Joaquin Valley, Kings County, California.

Environmental justice health issues have been an ongoing concern for the community and waste facility. The Kettleman Hills Hazardous Waste Facility is frequently criticized for its alleged health threats by the local organization 'The Town for Clean Air and Water' (El Pueblo para El Aire y Agua Limpio), and by environmental groups such as Greenaction. Waste Management, Inc. counters that it is a significant local employer, and donates funds to the local community, including Kettleman City Elementary School. The facility manager, Bob Henry, pointed out in a 2007 newspaper interview that it is periodically inspected by as many as nine federal, state, and local agencies. In 2007, Maricela Mares-Alatorre, a leader of 'People for Clean Air and Water,' was quoted as saying: "Are we supposed to be happy that they're getting more trash? Donations don't buy you health."

== Historical overview of related environmental controversies ==
=== 1975–1990 ===
In June 1975 Kings County, CA issued a permit to McKay Trucking for the disposal of oil field wastes in the Kettleman Hills area. Subsequently, in 1979, the land was bought by Chemical Waste Management, Inc., a subsidiary of Waste Management, Inc. In 1982, Chemical Waste Management, Inc. received a permit for the processing of PCBs (known carcinogens), and soon after a Class I waste disposal permit that allowed for the processing of nearly any type of hazardous waste. At the time, the establishment of this facility and its repurposing to a full Class I hazardous waste disposal site went unnoticed by the residents of Kettleman City within 4 miles away from the facility. Community opposition and awareness of the facility emerged in the early 1980s; motivated in part by articles published in local newspapers about multimillion-dollar fines levied against Chemical Waste Management, Inc. for violating environmental laws.

Because of its low average socioeconomic standing and 95% Latino population, Kettleman City and the nearby waste disposal site attracted the attention of the environmental justice movement. Advocates argued that Chemical Waste Management, Inc. and the local government were practicing environmental racism, pointing out that the nearest communities to all three major waste disposal sites in California were poor and almost entirely non-white. Environmental Justice groups also cited the 1984 Cerrell Report by the California Waste Management Board that suggested placing waste disposal sites and incinerators primarily in the communities that would be least able to resist. In 1988, a phone call from Greenpeace organizer Bradley Angel revealed to the Kettleman community that Chemical Waste Management, Inc. was planning to add a toxic waste incinerator to the disposal facility. Several residents attended a preliminary hearing on the incinerator and were concerned that a potential health risk would be placed so close to their town. This trial marked the beginning of a community-led grassroots environmental justice movement in Kettleman City, as well as the beginning of the ongoing conflict between the people of Kettleman City and Chemical Waste Management, Inc. In 1989, more than 200 residents from Kettleman City showed up to testify at the Kings County Planning Commission hearing on the incinerator project. When the incinerator project was approved, the residents of Kettleman City filed a lawsuit against Chemical Waste Management, Inc., alleging that their environmental impact report did not comply with the California Environmental Quality Act. A trial court ruled that Chemical Waste Management, Inc. had not sufficiently analyzed the environmental and health impacts of the incinerator, and had failed to provide a full Spanish version of their impacts report, preventing participation from Kettleman City residents. The company appealed the court's decision, but dropped the plans for the incinerator before an appeal decision had been reached.

=== 1990–2009 ===
Following the controversy over the incinerator, the waste disposal site continued to operate and reached its economic peak of operation during the early 1990s. Although the people of Kettleman City continued to protest against Chemical Waste Management, there were no major environmental justice battles in Kettleman City during these years, apart from the continued criticism of activists that the location of hazardous waste exhibited structural racism. The 1990s also saw the Kettleman Hills facility facing regular scrutiny and fines from the EPA and the TSCA enforcement committee. The EPA reports that the facility committed environmental violations every year between 1990 and 1995, as well as in 1998. In 2004, a TSCA compliance inspection of the Kettleman Hills Facility reached the conclusion that there had been no monitoring of certain PCBs since 1995, and that the failure to dispose of PCBs within the legal time limit had gone unreported on two occasions. That same report concluded that from 2002-2003 there were 16 spills of hazardous waste, and six instances of waste being stored in unsealed containers. The facility also underwent numerous permit expansions under Class I and Class III waste disposal during the mid to late 2000s, many of which were accompanied by public hearings that were well represented by Kettleman City community leaders.

=== 2009–2012 ===
The year 2009 marked the resurgence of the environmental justice movement in Kettleman City, as well as the renewal of the conflict between the people of Kettleman City and Chemical Waste Management, Inc. The environmental justice advocacy group Greenaction released a statement alleging a possible correlation between the recent high number of birth defects in the region, with 14 cases in 2007-2008, five of which were cleft lip and/or palate, and the presence of the waste disposal facility. The residents of Kettleman City voiced opposition to Chemical Waste Management, Inc.'s facility with a community-led movement. The Kings County's Public Health Officer was skeptical, stating that he understood the community's concern, but believed the birth defects were a "statistical anomaly". However, the state promised to conduct a wide range investigation into the high number of birth defects as well as into the water quality and the frequency of asthma and cancer. Not long after the birth defects controversy began, Chemical Waste Management, Inc. applied for a permit to expand the facility, and was met with heavy resistance from the Kettleman City community during the 60-day comment period. The Cal EPA granted them the permit to expand, pending the findings of the birth defects investigation, on December 21, 2009.

The initial findings of the Cal EPA and the California Department of Public Health (CDPH) were released in community meetings in early 2010. The report found that the birth defect rate was inconclusive due to a small sample size and no significant sources of environmental exposure were found in the city. However, the pesticides found in homes warranted further investigation. On January 20, soon after the initial findings had been released, Greenaction filed a lawsuit against the Kings County Board of Supervisors. Greenaction alleged that in light of the inconclusive and possibly flawed birth defect report, the approval of Chemical Waste Management, Inc.'s expansion permit violated the CEQA and state civil rights laws. That same week, California Senator Barbara Boxer issued a statement saying that "the Kettleman Hills Hazardous Waste Facility should not be expanded until there is more conclusive results on the potential health impacts on the local community." Within a week of the lawsuit, Governor Schwarzenegger ordered the Cal EPA and the CDPH to launch a full investigation into the correlation between the disposal facility and the health issues experienced by the residents of Kettleman City. The full 160-page report was released on November 22, 2010, and found that none of the possible exposures to hazardous materials could be correlated to an increase in birth defects. The report's recommendations were to continue to pursue a safer source of drinking water for Kettleman City, as well as to continue investigation into the effects of the trace presence of contaminants. A further update was released in 2011 stating that the level of birth defects in Kettleman City had dropped below their 2008 levels.

During the birth defects controversy, Chemical Waste Management, Inc. was fined $402,000 on November 29, 2011 for violating the TSCA. The investigation concluded that they had been using improper disposal techniques for carcinogenic PCBs and other hazardous material wastes without treatment. Waste Management, Inc. was further ordered to set aside $600,000 for the purpose of physical and operational improvements to the facility.

=== 2013–present ===
On July 2, 2013, the California Department of Toxic Substances Control—DTSC released a draft decision on a permit modification that would allow Waste Management, Inc. to increase the capacity of the hazardous waste landfill. This modification would add about 14 landfill acres and increases the capacity by 50 percent, or approximately 5 million cubic yards. The effect of this expansion would add an estimated 4.6 billion pounds of toxic waste to the site. On May 21, 2014, the DTSC issued a final permit approving the company's planned expansion to allow an additional 5.2 million metric tons of capacity. Appeals of the permit issuance were filed by Greenaction together with People for Clean Air and Water of Kettleman City and by the Center for Race, Poverty and the Environment. On October 14, 2014, the Department of Toxic Substances Control denied both appeals. Bradley Angel of Greenaction was quoted as saying that his group would continue to challenge the permit with a lawsuit and by filing administrative civil rights complaints in both state and federal courts.

Waste Management, Inc. was fined in March 2013 for failing to report more than 70 toxic waste spills at the Kettleman Hills facility to the DTSC, which the company claimed was irrelevant to its prospect for expansion. It was later extended to October 11, 2013.

== Relevant legislation ==
The Resource Conservation and Recovery Act (RCRA) was enacted in 1976 to govern the disposal of solid and hazardous waste. According to the Environmental Protection Agency, the goals of the RCRA are to focus on protecting human health and the environment from waste disposal as well as conserving natural resources and reducing waste generation. The “cradle to grave” provision of Subtitle C established a management program which required a strict permitting and control process for the creation and disposal of hazardous waste. Under this program, treatment, storage and disposal facilities (TSDFs) must meet specific criteria in order to be permitted or be allowed interim status to continue operating while un-permitted. The Kettleman Hills Hazardous Waste Facility is governed under the RCRA and thus is subject to these permitting requirements. As a result, the Kettleman Hills Facility has been required to request a modification of their current permit by the California Department of Toxic Substance Control in order to expand the facility by the requested 14 acres to make room for the disposal of more waste.

The Toxic Substances Control Act (TSCA), passed in 1976 worked to regulate the sale and use of chemicals in the U.S., but its primary focus was on polychlorinated biphenyls (PCBs). Its effects on the Kettleman Hills Hazardous Waste Facility is similar to the RCRA by requiring permitting by the EPA in order to make the requested 14 acre expansion into a site which allows for the dumping of PCBs. During this permitting process, the TSCA PCB permit application requires the EPA to issue a public notice once a decision has been reached, as well as hold a 60-day formal comment period for the public, as well as a formal public hearing.

In February 1994, Executive Order 12898 was implemented which addressed issues of minority and low-income groups bearing the burden of disproportionate negative environmental and health effects. It states that “each Federal Agency shall make achieving environmental justice part of its mission by identifying and addressing as appropriate, disproportionately high and adverse human health or environmental effects of its programs, policies, and activities on minority populations and low income populations.” It also set forth a series of steps for assisting and aiding federal organizations in addressing environmental injustice. Requirements of the executive order, such as translating documents into the native language of a community have been key issues for groups such as Greenaction in the dispute with the Kettleman Hills Hazardous Waste Facility.

== Risk factors for environmental injustices ==
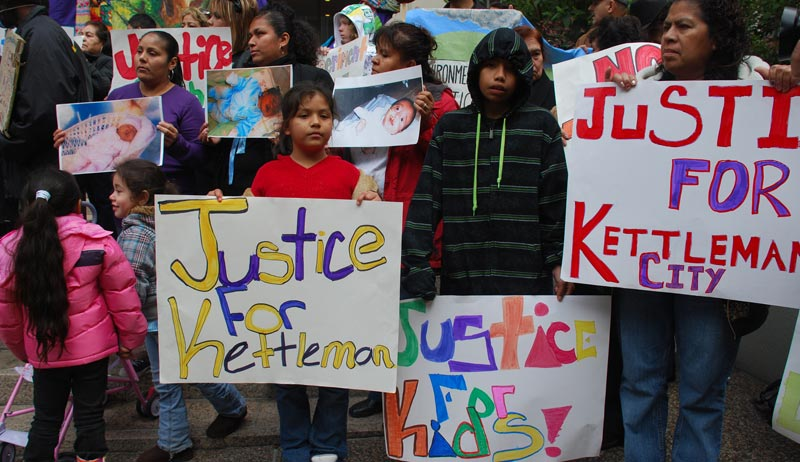
Kettleman City Protest

Issues of environmental justice are pertinent to the largely minority population Kettleman City community as studies show that blacks and respondents at lower educational levels, and to a lesser degree, lower income levels were significantly more likely to live within a mile of a polluting facility. Greenaction, a San Francisco-based environmental justice organization, has been working with the local community to document the cases of infant deaths and believes there are issues of environmental injustice due to the city's demographics. Within Kettleman City's population that is 25 years or older, only 30% have completed high school or its equivalent, and 56.4% have less than a 9th grade education. The majority of residents are from Mexico and are Spanish-speaking. In the 2000 Census, the median household income was $22,409 and 43.7% of the population was living below the poverty level. Compared to the US population, Kettleman City residents are younger, and are more likely to rent rather than own their homes.

Environmental justice is principally concerned with people's and communities’ entitlement to equal protection of environmental and public health laws and regulations. There are three separate perspectives on why environmental injustices exist: economic, sociopolitical, and racial. However, the three categories are not mutually exclusive, considering that, for example, economic motives may coincide with sociopolitical factors.

Economic explanations argue that the industry is not intentionally discriminating against racial, ethnic, or poor minority groups. The industry is only trying to maximize profits and siting a new facility in areas where the land is cheap serves to maximize profits. Industrial labor pools and manufacturing materials tend to be cheaper in this aspect as well. The racial and socioeconomic composition of a community may subsequently change with the addition of a waste facility. The ensuing negative health and environmental impacts result in a flight of affluent residents to more desirable neighborhoods, subsequently driving land values even lower. Thus, the depression of property values results in an influx of poor and people of color as housing becomes more affordable.

Sociopolitical explanations argue that industry and government seek the path of least resistance when siting new hazardous waste facilities. In an effort to avoid controversy, sites are located in areas where communities are least capable of mounting an opposition. More plainly, facilities are located in areas where communities are not capable to politicize and oppose the new factory. Further, communities without a high degree of pre-existing social capital as well as low levels of voting behavior, home ownership, wealth, and disposable income are more vulnerable to high concentrations of polluting facilities than other communities.

Racial discrimination explanations illustrate that although present-day siting decisions may be based on a rational desire to place new facilities in areas that have been zoned industrial, these wind up disproportionately in communities composed primarily of people of color because of past discriminatory decisions about where to line industrial zones. Current decisions that may seem facially neutral may have discriminatory outcomes because of past discriminatory actions

== Environmental impacts ==
In 2008 Waste Management applied to expand their landfill for the purpose of storing polychlorinated biphenyl (PCB) waste. The United States Environmental Protection Agency (EPA) issued an investigation of a variety of invertebrates, fish, reptiles, mammals, and plants were in order to determine an environmental impact, if any. The EPA's July 2009 report followed that two species may be affected by the expansion: the San Joaquin kit fox and the blunt-nosed leopard lizard. Furthermore, in 1984, Waste Management discovered groundwater contamination underneath two formerly unlined ponds. Pond P-09 was lined in 1985 and cleanup began in 1988. Pond P-12 stopped receiving waste in 1985 and was closed in 1997. Groundwater cleanup began in 1985. Waste Management has 48 monitoring wells in the surrounding and impacted areas as of December 2012. The California Department of Toxic Substances Control (DTSC) ordered the facility to clean up spills of PCBs around the storage building, and as of February 2012, DTSC reported that the soil cleanup and removal was the final step in protecting human health and the environment as there was no longer a threat.

Under the direction of the Kings County Planning Agency, in March 2008 CH2M Hill, an independent engineering and consulting firm, prepared an impact report aimed to identify and evaluate potentially significant adverse environmental impacts associated with the proposed expansion of the Kettleman Hills Facility.

- Aesthetics
  - The areas of the Kettleman Hills Facility that would be affected by the expansion project will not be visible from Kettleman City, therefore there are no significant aesthetic impacts.
- Air Quality
  - It will not exceed federal and state standards for nitrogen oxides, reactive organic gases, sulfide dioxides, carbon dioxide or atmospheric particulate matter (PM) with a diameter of 2.5 micrometers or less at the facility's boundary
  - The project will exceed the federal and state standard for PM10 at the facility's boundary. The San Joaquin Valley Air Basin is a designated non-attainment area, that is that the air quality in that region is worse than NAAQS standards, for the federal and state ozone 1 and 8-hour standards, and for both the federal and state PM10 and PM2.5 standard, the project is found to have both project-specific and cumulative significant impacts on air quality.
- Biological Resources
  - 103 acres of land are located outside of the existing facility's area
  - Four protected and sensitive wildlife species have the potential to occur within the proposed project's area
  - Due to the project's construction in undisturbed areas, the project is found to not have a significant impact to protected or sensitive wildlife species
- Culture and Paleontology
  - The project area does not contain potentially significant archaeological resources
  - Paleontological studies report that the probability of fossil occurrence in the proposed area appears to be moderate to high
  - The probability of impact on paleontological resources is also moderate to high
- Additional Impacts
  - There will be a continuation of the same waste transport and disposal activities
  - No additional impact to Kettleman City Elementary School, the nearest school located about 3.5 miles from the current facility
- Groundwater
  - Project found to be designed to meet state and federal requirements to assure that impacts will not occur to groundwater or surface water
  - No significant impact to groundwater or surface water resources
- Ambient Noise
  - The maximum onside noise levels for the proposed project would remain below the Kings County noise standard of 70 decibels (dB) for agricultural lands
- Climate Impact
  - Carbon dioxide emissions associated with the expansion project are not new emissions
    - The proposed projects will continue the maximum average of vehicle trips to and from the facility, so the emissions are not new emissions, but a continuation of the facility's already scheduled transportation trips
  - Transportation emissions would not result in a net increase in global greenhouse gas emissions
  - Any substantial amount of greenhouse gas emissions are considered significant in relation to their impact on climate change
  - The total incremental estimated carbon dioxide emissions by the expansion facility contributes to greenhouse gas emissions and is considered a significant contribution to the cumulative assessment of global climate change

On January 29, 2010, Governor Arnold Schwarzenegger directed the Cal/EPA and California Department of Public Health(CDPH) to assess the potential for a relationship between environmental contaminants and health defects. This was spurred by community concerns regarding a recent outbreak of birth defects. The Chemical Waste Management Kettleman Hills facility was found to not be the single direct causal factor in the recent birth defects.The Cal/EPA tested the air, soil, and water at agricultural operations, the Kettleman Hills Hazardous Waste Facility, the Kettleman City Elementary School, and possible illegal dump sites for 27 pesticides, air pollutants, arsenic, lead, soil and soil gas contaminants. The Cal/EPA found higher than normal levels of arsenic in tap and well water, low levels of lead in town and school wells, benzene in air near treatment unit that removes chemical from well water, one home yard that had high levels of a banned pesticide.

== Potential health effects ==
The community of Kettleman City has suspected negative health effects caused by the Waste Facility multiple times.

In 2007, the surrounding community in Kettleman City voiced their concerns regarding potential health effects in response to Chemical Waste Management's application for a federal permit renewal in the same year. The permit was to allow the facility to continue storing and disposing PCB waste at the facility. The EPA responded by ordering the facility to conduct a PCB Congener study. The facility collected soil, vegetation, and air samples at the perimeter of the CWM Facility to be tested in a State-certified laboratory. The findings concluded that concentrations of PCB congeners measured in soil samples are 2,000 times below the EPA's risk-based levels residential clean-up levels. The risk of health impacts from soil, vegetation, and air were within an acceptable range as with other rural areas without any known PCB activity. Concentrations of PCB congeners measured in soils, vegetation and air do not adversely affect ecological species, and there is no evidence that PCB congeners would migrate off-site at concentrations that would adversely affect the neighboring environment and communities.

In 2009, the community suspected birth defects caused by the waste facility. However, CDPH has not determined Kettleman Waste Facility to be the cause of health effects. The Kings County Department of Public Health stated that it would continue its investigation but that their preliminary determination was "that to the extent that a cluster may exist, it is most likely a random event unrelated to any environmental exposure unique to Kettleman City."

Even though “scientifically rigorous studies of causes of human birth defects generally require evaluation of hundreds of birth defects or more", the CDPH's objectives were limited and largely focused on evaluating risk factors because of the fewer than dozen cases of birth defects in Kettleman City. The CDPH investigated a total of 11 eligible children born with major, structural birth defects between 2007 and March 31, 2010 to mothers who had lived in the Kettleman City area during their pregnancies. Through a mixed-methods approach consisting of interviews and supplementary medical history reports the CDPH did not find a specific cause or environmental exposure among the mother that would explain the increase in the number of children born with birth defects. It was found that some children had multiple abnormalities, while others had single defects. All the birth defects represented different underlying conditions, but a few shared some features. None of the mothers interviewed during the investigation used tobacco, alcohol, or other drugs that could cause the birth defects. Furthermore, the mothers were all in good health and did not have suspect medical histories.

The conclusions of the investigation have been contended by Greenaction and the local community group "El Pueblo para El Aire y Agua Limpoio" ("People for Clean Air and water"). Bradley Angel of Greenaction in Kettleman City argues that the investigation was not thorough enough, neglecting to test blood and tissue samples of those affected. He also notes that the investigation did not adequately test for pesticides inside homes. The reported defects were also evident in areas around California and elsewhere. The findings concluded that, coupled with the lack of any shared unusual exposures, the birth defects were not caused by a common factor.

A California Department of Public Health (CDPH) update for 2009-2011 concluded that the rates of birth defects in Kettleman City in 2010 and 2011 appear to be returning to the lower rates seen prior to 2008. CDPH reviewed the Birth Defects Registry data from Kettleman City and still did not find a common cause for the birth defects.

== Financial implications ==
The issue in Kettleman City has resulted in much discussion over the financial implications for the county, city, and company. The Kettleman Hills Hazardous Waste Facility initially requested the expansion due to the near filling of their 10.7 million-cubic-yard site. Lily Quiroa, a spokeswoman for Waste Management, Inc. has stated that as a result of the denial of expansion, “we have laid off more than two-thirds of our employees. There has been a big impact on our business here, and it has had an impact in the economy in this county." In 2012, it was reported that the company paid approximately $312,000 in fines as a result of not reporting waste spills that had occurred.

Aside from the company, the county also stands to gain $1.5 million in fees from the truckloads of waste deposited annually, as well as $17.5 million to the economy of the county from the facility's operation.

The residents of Kettleman City have been promised financial benefits as well if the expansion is passed. Chemical Waste Inc. has offered to provide numerous donations as well as payoff the remaining debt that the Kettleman City Community Services District owes on its water system, an estimated $552,000, which would allow for the community to receive grant money from the state. Other such examples of donations include $150,000 to create safe pedestrian crossing spaces for residents to use on Highway 41. Maricela Mares-Alatorre is in opposition to such funding however, stating that “I know Chem Waste likes to frame it as they’re being good neighbors, but the truth is that they’re buying good will. If you give me a choice between my good will and the health of the community, the health of my family, I’m going to choose the health of my family.”
