= California State Route 41 =

Highway in California

State Route 41
- SR 41 highlighted in red

Route information
- Maintained by Caltrans
- Length: 185.594 mi (298.685 km) (plus about 6.5 mi (10.5 km) on SR 46, and does not include portion in Yosemite National Park)
- Existed: 1934–present

Major junctions
- South end: SR 1 in Morro Bay
- US 101 in Atascadero; SR 46 from Shandon to Cholame; I-5 in Kettleman City; SR 198 in Lemoore; SR 99 in Fresno; SR 180 / SR 168 in Fresno; SR 49 in Oakhurst
- North end: Yosemite National Park

Location
- Country: United States
- State: California
- Counties: San Luis Obispo, Kern, Kings, Fresno, Madera, Mariposa

Highway system
- State highways in California; Interstate; US; State; Scenic; History; Pre‑1964; Unconstructed; Deleted; Freeways
← I-40	→ SR 42

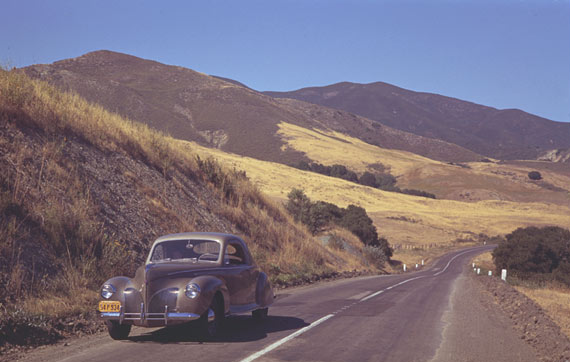
Morro Bay - Atascadero Road in 1940. Car is a then-new 1940 Lincoln-Zephyr.

State Route 41 (SR 41) is a state highway in the U.S. State of California, connecting the Central Coast with the San Joaquin Valley and the Sierra Nevada. Its southern terminus is at the Cabrillo Highway (SR 1) in Morro Bay, and its northern terminus is in Yosemite National Park. It has been constructed as an expressway from near SR 198 in Lemoore north to the south part of Fresno, where the Yosemite Freeway begins, passing along the east side of downtown and extending north into Madera County. Though maps and signs may show the highway extending north inside Yosemite National Park from its entrance to Yosemite Valley, this segment is federally maintained and is not included in the state route logs.

== Route description ==
Route 41 is defined in section 341 of the California Streets and Highways Code. The definition omits the concurrency with Route 46 instead of duplicating that segment in the other route's definition in the code:

Route 41 is from:
(a) Route 1 in Morro Bay to Route 46.
(b) Route 46 to Route 99 in Fresno.
(c) Route 99 in Fresno to Yosemite National Park.

The majority of Route 41 runs as either two-lane rural highway or four-lane divided highway. The only part of SR 41 that turns into a freeway itself is in Fresno County and parts of Madera. The southern end of the highway intersects SR 1 in Morro Bay. Between Morro Bay and Fresno, the highway intersects U.S. Route 101 in Atascadero, proceeds through the Coast Range and intersects SR 46. Actor James Dean died in an accident in 1955 at the intersection of SR 46 in Cholame. Currently, there is a memorial located there. The interchange is now called the James Dean Memorial Junction. Between SR 46 and SR 33, SR 41 ascends the Diablo Range and Cottonwood Pass and briefly travels through Kern County without any intersections in its entirety. After entering Kings County, it reaches SR 33. SR 41 then intersects Interstate 5 south of Kettleman City. The Kettleman Hills Hazardous Waste Facility is located 5.6 km (3.5 mi) SSW of Kettleman City on the west side of the highway in the Kettleman Hills. Just before reaching the intersection at SR 198 outside of the city of Lemoore, SR 41 becomes a four-lane divided highway until just southeast of Riverdale, where SR 41 reverts to one lane in each direction. The El Adobe de los Robles Rancho built by pioneer Daniel Rhoads can be found north of Lemoore.

Southeast of Caruthers, SR 41 becomes a four-lane divided highway and eventually a freeway approaching the Fresno city limits. The route intersects SR 99 near Jensen Avenue. Complete access is not available between SR 41/SR 99. For example, there is no direct connector between the southbound SR 41 and northbound SR 99; drivers wanting to make this transition must exit at the SR 41/SR 180 interchange, head west on SR 180, and then transition onto SR 99 at the interchange between those two freeways. Likewise, there is no direct connector between the northbound SR 41 and the southbound SR 99. Drivers must exit at Jensen Avenue, head east on Jensen until its junction with SR 99 a half-mile east of SR 41, and then make the southbound transition onto SR 99.

SR 41 continues north into downtown Fresno, then intersects SR 180 at a section of the latter route that links SR 41 to both SR 99 to the west, and to SR 168 to the east. North of Fresno, the route crosses the San Joaquin River, and enters Madera County near Valley Children's Hospital before reverting to a two-lane highway. 8.5 miles (13.7 km) further north, SR 41 intersects with SR 145, before entering California's Sierra-Nevada mountain range. SR 41 continues through the towns of Coarsegold and Oakhurst, where it intersects with SR 49.

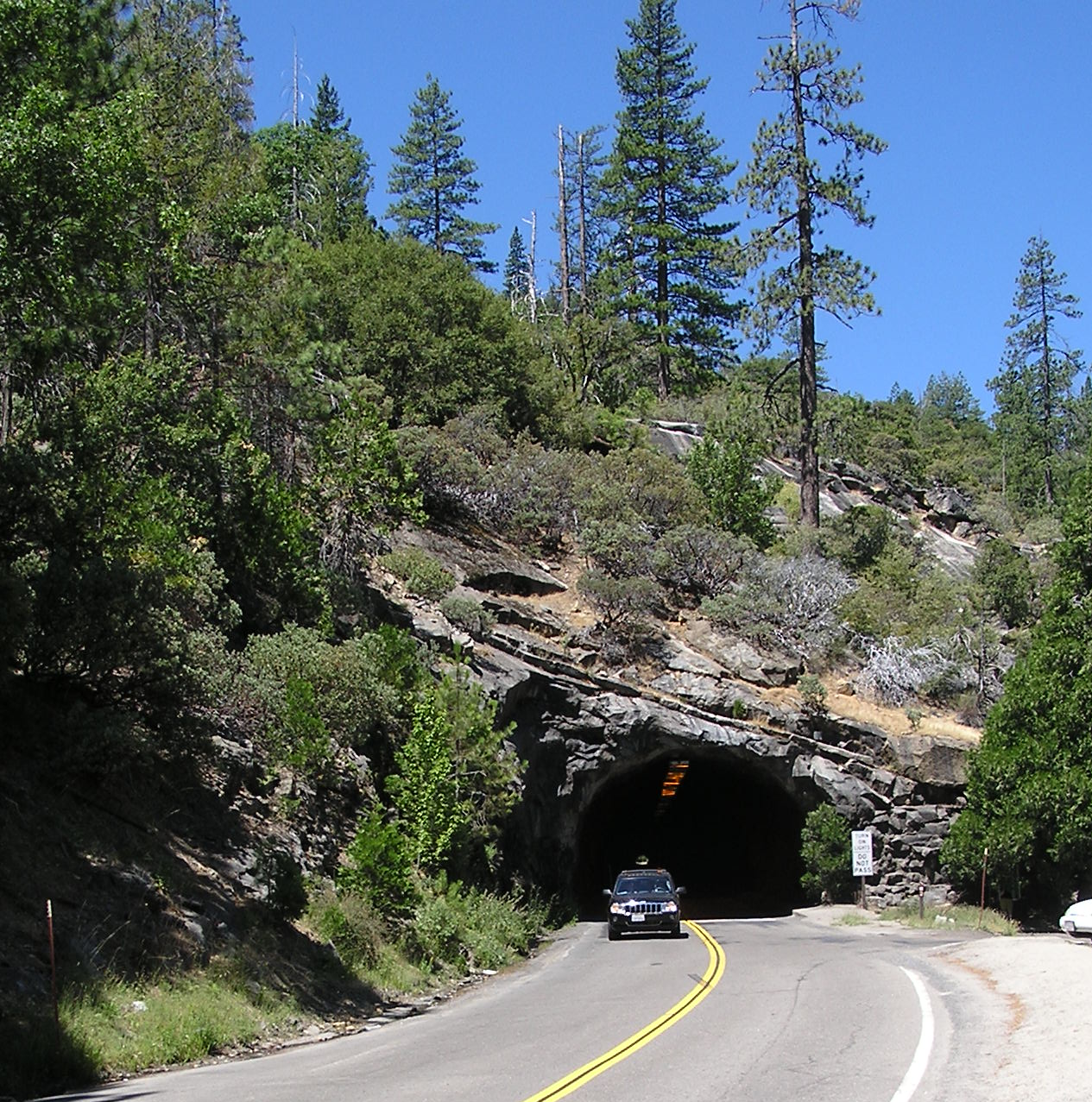
East portal of Wawona Tunnel near the northern terminus of SR 41

SR 41 then heads north to the southern entrance to Yosemite National Park. Inside the park, state routes are federally maintained and are not included in the state route logs. Although there is an "End SR 41" sign south of the park's entrance, state routes within the park may still be signed at intersections. The highway continues as Wawona Road north to Wawona and Yosemite West before turning east to pass through Wawona Tunnel. Tunnel View is a viewpoint located just outside the east end of the Wawona Tunnel, and provides the first view of Yosemite Valley. The route then continues into Yosemite Valley where it terminates at SR 140/Southside Drive.

Except between US 101 in Atascadero and SR 46 near Shandon, SR 41 is part of the California Freeway and Expressway System, and north of SR 46 is part of the National Highway System, a network of highways that are considered essential to the country's economy, defense, and mobility by the Federal Highway Administration. Three segments – from SR 1 to US 101, SR 46 to SR 33, and SR 49 at Oakhurst to Yosemite (the Wawona Road) – are eligible for inclusion in the State Scenic Highway System, but SR 41 is not officially designated as a scenic highway by the California Department of Transportation. SR 41 is known as the E.G. Lewis Highway from SR 1 to US 101 in San Luis Obispo County, the Dwight David Eisenhower Memorial Freeway from Ventura Avenue in Fresno to Herndon Avenue in Fresno, the Donald DeMers Highway from Jensen Avenue in Fresno to Elkhorn Avenue, the Yosemite Freeway from Elkhorn Avenue to the Fresno-Madera County line, the Southern Yosemite Highway from the Fresno-Madera County line to Yosemite National Park, and the Wawona Road from Fresno to Yosemite National Park.

== History ==
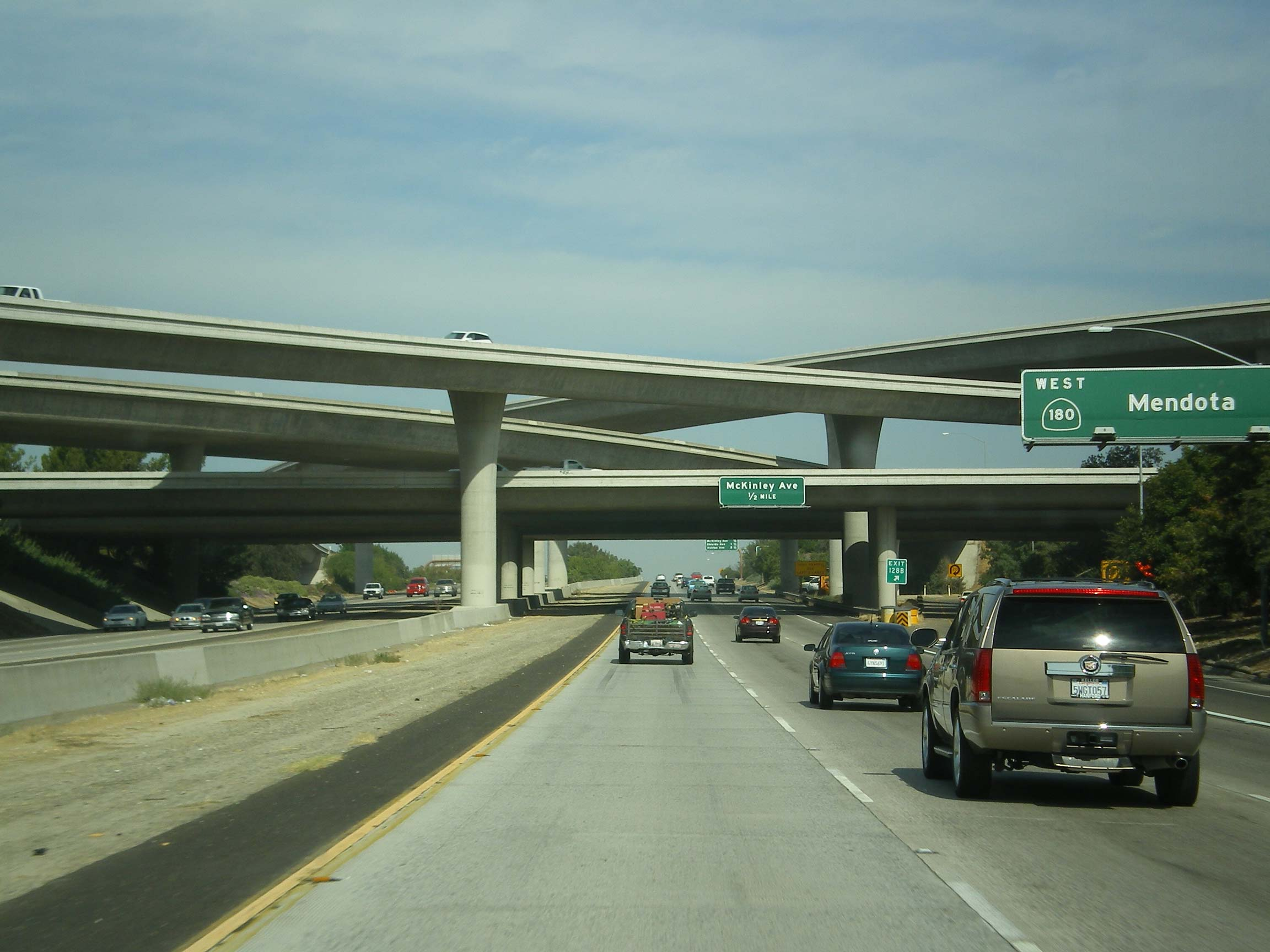
Northbound on Route 41 in Fresno at the Route 180 interchange

In 1930, the counties of Fresno, Kings, Kern, and San Luis Obispo considered organizing a joint highway district to construct a shortcut connecting Fresno with the Pacific Ocean at Morro Bay. This highway would pass through Kettleman City on its way to the Cholame Lateral (Legislative Route 33) near Cholame or Shandon, and then continue to Morro Bay, where a new harbor was being developed. The entire length from Fresno to Morro Bay, as well as the Wawona Road to Yosemite, was added to the state highway system in 1933 as Route 125, and subsequently improved by the state. In 1934, the state sign route system was established, and Sign Route 41 was designated along Route 125 from Yosemite south and southwest to Cholame and then west through Paso Robles to Cambria via Legislative Route 33. The part of Route 125 southwest of Cholame instead became part of the new U.S. Route 466.

By the 1950s, the short piece of US 466 (Route 125) between Creston and Atascadero had not yet been paved, and so US 466 was moved to the longer but better road via Paso Robles, replacing SR 41 to Paso Robles and overlapping US 101 to Atascadero. As SR 41 had not been signed over the unpaved road west of Paso Robles, it was truncated to Cholame. US 466 was eliminated in the 1964 renumbering, becoming SR 46 east from Paso Robles. However, instead of going south and west to Morro Bay, SR 46 continued west to Cambria, and the road via Creston and Atascadero to Morro Bay (which had since been paved) became part of SR 41.

In the 1980s, the urban stretch of 41 running through Fresno was upgraded to freeway standards, intersecting SR 99 to the south. In the late 1990s and early 2000s, the freeway portion was extended several miles beyond Fresno in both directions.

Also in the late 1990s and early 2000s in Atascadero, the old SR 41 alignment used to cut through downtown by going north on El Camino Real and turning right onto West Mall. Then it continued past the Atascadero Colony Building and crossed the 1921 Atascadero Creek Bridge before turning left onto Capistrano Avenue. It then went under a low clearance railroad crossing and a dangerous narrow bridge crossing the Salinas River before rejoining its existing alignment. Then Caltrans built a bypass of this dangerous route with a long wider bridge crossing the railroad, Sycamore Drive, and the river before joining the original 1950s SR 41. SR 41 is now currently signed on this bypass. Since then, the old bridge was demolished but the railroad undercrossing still remains. There's an old sign on Capistrano Avenue that still marks it as "Hwy 41" and signs on El Camino Real that mark West Mall with covered up "41" shields.

In February 2024, Caltrans closed a portion of SR 41 near Stratford in a project to replace the 1947 Kings River bridge, forcing a 32 miles (51 km) detour.

== Future ==
In August 2026, Caltrans broke ground on a $77.2 million project to upgrade 7.1 miles (11.4 km) of SR 41 to a four-lane expressway, from Excelsior Avenue in Kings County to Elkhorn Avenue in Fresno County. The project is scheduled to be complete in Fall 2028.

The Kings County Association of Governments has plans to improve the state highways within the county. Developers are interested in building distribution warehouses in Kings County because of its strategic location midway between the Los Angeles and San Francisco Bay areas, but they are currently turned off by the lack of freeway access. For SR 41, the plan is to upgrade it so the highway is a continuous freeway from I-5 north to Fresno County. However, Kings County voters have shown little interest in passing any transportation taxes to fund these projects.

== Major intersections ==
Except where prefixed with a letter, postmiles were measured on the road as it was in 1964, based on the alignment that existed at the time, and do not necessarily reflect current mileage. Postmile prefixes include: R reflecting a realignment in the route since then, M indicating a second realignment, L referring to an overlap due to a correction or change, and T indicating postmiles classified as temporary. Segments that remain unconstructed or have been relinquished to local control may be omitted. The numbers reset at county lines; the start and end postmiles in each county are given in the county column.

County	Location	Postmile	Exit	Destinations	Notes
San Luis Obispo; SLO 0.00-50.43	Morro Bay	0.00		Atascadero Road	Continuation beyond SR 1
San Luis Obispo; SLO 0.00-50.43	Morro Bay	0.00		SR 1 – Cayucos, Cambria, Hearst Castle	Interchange; south end of SR 41; SR 1 exit 279B
San Luis Obispo; SLO 0.00-50.43	Atascadero	15.89		US 101 – San Francisco, Los Angeles	Interchange; US 101 exit 219
San Luis Obispo; SLO 0.00-50.43	Atascadero	15.96		El Camino Real	
San Luis Obispo; SLO 0.00-50.43		27.98		SR 229 south – Creston	
San Luis Obispo; SLO 0.00-50.43	Shandon	41.16 48.63 (Note: Indicates that the postmile represents the distance along SR 46 rather than SR 41.)		SR 46 west / McMillan Canyon Road – Paso Robles	South end of SR 46 overlap
San Luis Obispo; SLO 0.00-50.43		49.60	Shandon Rest Area		
San Luis Obispo; SLO 0.00-50.43	Cholame	55.11 43.85	—	SR 46 east – Bakersfield	Interchange; north end of SR 46 overlap; former US 466 east; SR 41 south follows exit 45; SR 41 north follows SR 46 east exit 56
Kern; KER 0.00-4.98	No major junctions				
Kings; KIN 0.00-R48.28		8.10		SR 33 – Avenal, Taft	
Kings; KIN 0.00-R48.28		16.28		I-5 – Sacramento, Los Angeles	Interchange; I-5 exit 309
Kings; KIN 0.00-R48.28	Lemoore	R39.96		SR 198 – Hanford, Sequoia Park, Coalinga, Lemoore NAS	Interchange; SR 198 exit 77
Kings; KIN 0.00-R48.28	Lemoore	R40.14	South end of freeway		
Kings; KIN 0.00-R48.28	Lemoore	R40.95	—	Bush Street	
Kings; KIN 0.00-R48.28	Lemoore	R42.15	North end of freeway		
Kings; KIN 0.00-R48.28		R48.28	—	Excelsior Avenue	Interchange
Fresno; FRE R0.00-33.45		R16.10		SR 41 Bus. north (Adams Avenue) – Easton	
Fresno; FRE R0.00-33.45	Easton	R18.10		SR 41 Bus. south (American Avenue) – Easton	
Fresno; FRE R0.00-33.45		R19.11	South end of freeway		
Fresno; FRE R0.00-33.45	Fresno	R20.11	124	North Avenue	
Fresno; FRE R0.00-33.45	Fresno	R21.13	125	Jensen Avenue	
Fresno; FRE R0.00-33.45	Fresno	R21.90	126A	SR 99 north – Madera, Sacramento	Northbound exit and southbound entrance; SR 99 south exit 131
Fresno; FRE R0.00-33.45	Fresno	R21.90	126A	SR 99 south – Bakersfield, Los Angeles	Southbound exit and northbound entrance; SR 99 north exit 131
Fresno; FRE R0.00-33.45	Fresno	R22.80	126B	Van Ness Avenue – Civic Center	Former SR 180
Fresno; FRE R0.00-33.45	Fresno	R22.95	127A	O Street	Southbound exit only
Fresno; FRE R0.00-33.45	Fresno	R23.74	127B	Tulare Street, Divisadero Street	Signed as exit 127 northbound
Fresno; FRE R0.00-33.45	Fresno	R24.53	128	SR 168 east (Sierra Freeway) / SR 180 (Sequoia-Kings Canyon Freeway) – Clovis, Huntington Lake, Kings Canyon, Mendota	Signed as exits 128A (east) and 128B (west) northbound; SR 168 exit 1A; SR 180 exits 59A-B
Fresno; FRE R0.00-33.45	Fresno	R25.26	129	McKinley Avenue	
Fresno; FRE R0.00-33.45	Fresno	R26.46	130	Shields Avenue	
Fresno; FRE R0.00-33.45	Fresno	R27.47	131	Ashlan Avenue	
Fresno; FRE R0.00-33.45	Fresno	R28.47	132	Shaw Avenue – Clovis	Former SR 168; serves California State University Fresno
Fresno; FRE R0.00-33.45	Fresno	R29.46	133	Bullard Avenue	
Fresno; FRE R0.00-33.45	Fresno	R30.45	134	Herndon Avenue – Clovis	Connects to SR 99 north
Fresno; FRE R0.00-33.45	Fresno	R31.68	135	Friant Road, Blackstone Avenue – Millerton Lake	
Madera; MAD 0.00-45.74		R1.20	138	Rio Mesa Boulevard, Children's Boulevard (SR 41 Bus. north)	Signed as exits 138A (Rio Mesa Boulevard) and 138B (Children's Boulevard) northbound
Madera; MAD 0.00-45.74		R2.16	North end of freeway		
Madera; MAD 0.00-45.74		3.23		SR 41 Bus. south (Avenue 12) – Madera Ranchos	
Madera; MAD 0.00-45.74		9.25		SR 145 south to SR 99 north / Road 145 – Madera, Millerton Lake	
Madera; MAD 0.00-45.74	Oakhurst	35.48		SR 49 north – Ahwahnee, Mariposa	
Mariposa; MPA 0.00-4.92	Fish Camp	4.92	North end of state maintenance near Yosemite National Park south entrance		
Mariposa; MPA 0.00-4.92	Yosemite National Park		Southern/Mariposa Grove Entrance Station; park fee or pass required for entry		
Mariposa; MPA 0.00-4.92	Yosemite National Park		Wawona Tunnel		
Mariposa; MPA 0.00-4.92	Yosemite National Park			SR 140 east	Entrance only
Mariposa; MPA 0.00-4.92	Yosemite National Park			Southside Drive	Continuation beyond SR 140; southbound entrance only accessible via Northside Drive to SR 140
1.000 mi = 1.609 km; 1.000 km = 0.621 mi: Concurrency terminus; Incomplete access; Tolled
