= Kettleman City, California =

Kettleman City
- census-designated place
- Kettleman City in 2008

- Location in Kings County and the state of California

- Location within the United States
- Coordinates: 36°00′30″N 119°57′42″W
- Country: United States
- State: California
- County: Kings

Area
  - Total: 0.211 sq mi (0.546 km^{2})
  - Land: 0.211 sq mi (0.546 km^{2})
  - Water: 0 sq mi (0.000 km^{2})
- Elevation: 253 ft (77 m)

Population (2020)
  - Total: 1,242
  - Density: 5,890/sq mi (2,270/km^{2})
- Time zone: UTC-08:00 (PST)
  - Summer (DST): UTC-07:00 (PDT)
- ZIP code: 93239
- Area code: 559
- FIPS code: 06-38394
- GNIS feature ID: 1652733

Kettleman City is a census-designated place (CDP) in Kings County, California, United States. Kettleman City is located 28 miles (45 km) southwest of Hanford, 54 miles (88 km) south of Fresno, at an elevation of 253 feet (77 m), and sits only about 1/2 mile north of the 36th parallel north latitude. It is part of the Hanford-Corcoran metropolitan area. The population was 1,242 at the 2020 census, down from 1,439 at the 2010 census. When travelling between Los Angeles and either San Francisco or Sacramento via Interstate 5, Kettleman City (at Exit 309) is near the halfway point, and is thus a major stopping point for food and lodging.

== Geography ==
Kettleman City is located on the west side of the San Joaquin Valley at the base of the Kettleman Hills, near the historic shoreline of what used to be Tulare Lake. Its coordinates are 36°00′30″N 119°57′42″W.

According to the United States Census Bureau, the CDP has a total area of 0.2 square miles (0.52 km^{2}), all land.

Kettleman City is divided into two areas. The commercial zone of gas, food and lodging businesses is at Kettleman Junction, where Interstate 5 and State Route 41 meet. The residential area together with some retail businesses and county government buildings is located about 1.2 mi (1.9 km) north on State Route 41. The California Aqueduct crosses State Route 41 between these two areas.

=== Climate ===
Kettleman City has a Cold semi-arid climate (Köppen: BSk) typical of that of the San Joaquin Valley, with hot, dry summers and cool winters characterized by dense tule fog. The average annual precipitation is 7.50 in (191 mm), falling mainly from November through April. It is located in hardiness zone 9a.

Climate data for Kettleman City, California, 1991–2020 normals, extremes 1955–present
Month	Jan	Feb	Mar	Apr	May	Jun	Jul	Aug	Sep	Oct	Nov	Dec	Year
Record high °F (°C)	79 (26)	84 (29)	92 (33)	99 (37)	106 (41)	116 (47)	115 (46)	114 (46)	116 (47)	103 (39)	91 (33)	79 (26)	116 (47)
Mean maximum °F (°C)	68.2 (20.1)	73.9 (23.3)	82.9 (28.3)	91.7 (33.2)	99.5 (37.5)	105.6 (40.9)	108.3 (42.4)	106.5 (41.4)	102.9 (39.4)	93.9 (34.4)	81.3 (27.4)	69.5 (20.8)	108.3 (42.4)
Mean daily maximum °F (°C)	56.6 (13.7)	63.3 (17.4)	69.5 (20.8)	75.5 (24.2)	84.4 (29.1)	92.4 (33.6)	98.7 (37.1)	97.5 (36.4)	92.2 (33.4)	81.4 (27.4)	67.3 (19.6)	57.5 (14.2)	78.0 (25.6)
Daily mean °F (°C)	46.3 (7.9)	51.5 (10.8)	56.4 (13.6)	61.7 (16.5)	69.9 (21.1)	77.1 (25.1)	83.1 (28.4)	81.8 (27.7)	76.4 (24.7)	66.4 (19.1)	54.2 (12.3)	46.5 (8.1)	64.3 (17.9)
Mean daily minimum °F (°C)	36.0 (2.2)	39.6 (4.2)	43.4 (6.3)	48.0 (8.9)	55.4 (13.0)	61.7 (16.5)	67.5 (19.7)	66.2 (19.0)	60.6 (15.9)	51.4 (10.8)	41.2 (5.1)	35.6 (2.0)	50.6 (10.3)
Mean minimum °F (°C)	27.0 (−2.8)	29.8 (−1.2)	33.4 (0.8)	37.7 (3.2)	44.4 (6.9)	50.7 (10.4)	56.4 (13.6)	58.8 (14.9)	50.8 (10.4)	40.0 (4.4)	30.9 (−0.6)	25.2 (−3.8)	23.0 (−5.0)
Record low °F (°C)	15 (−9)	22 (−6)	26 (−3)	31 (−1)	35 (2)	39 (4)	48 (9)	48 (9)	46 (8)	25 (−4)	23 (−5)	17 (−8)	15 (−9)
Average precipitation inches (mm)	1.39 (35)	1.47 (37)	1.46 (37)	0.59 (15)	0.37 (9.4)	0.04 (1.0)	0.13 (3.3)	0.02 (0.51)	0.06 (1.5)	0.16 (4.1)	0.57 (14)	1.24 (31)	7.50 (191)
Average precipitation days (≥ 0.01 in)	6.0	6.0	5.9	3.7	1.4	0.5	0.2	0.3	0.5	1.3	3.6	6.6	36.0
Source: NOAA

== Cityscape ==
Kettleman City has a number of fast food restaurants at its freeway exit. The community has no grocery stores other than convenience markets. Kettleman City has no street lights and almost no sidewalks.

== History ==
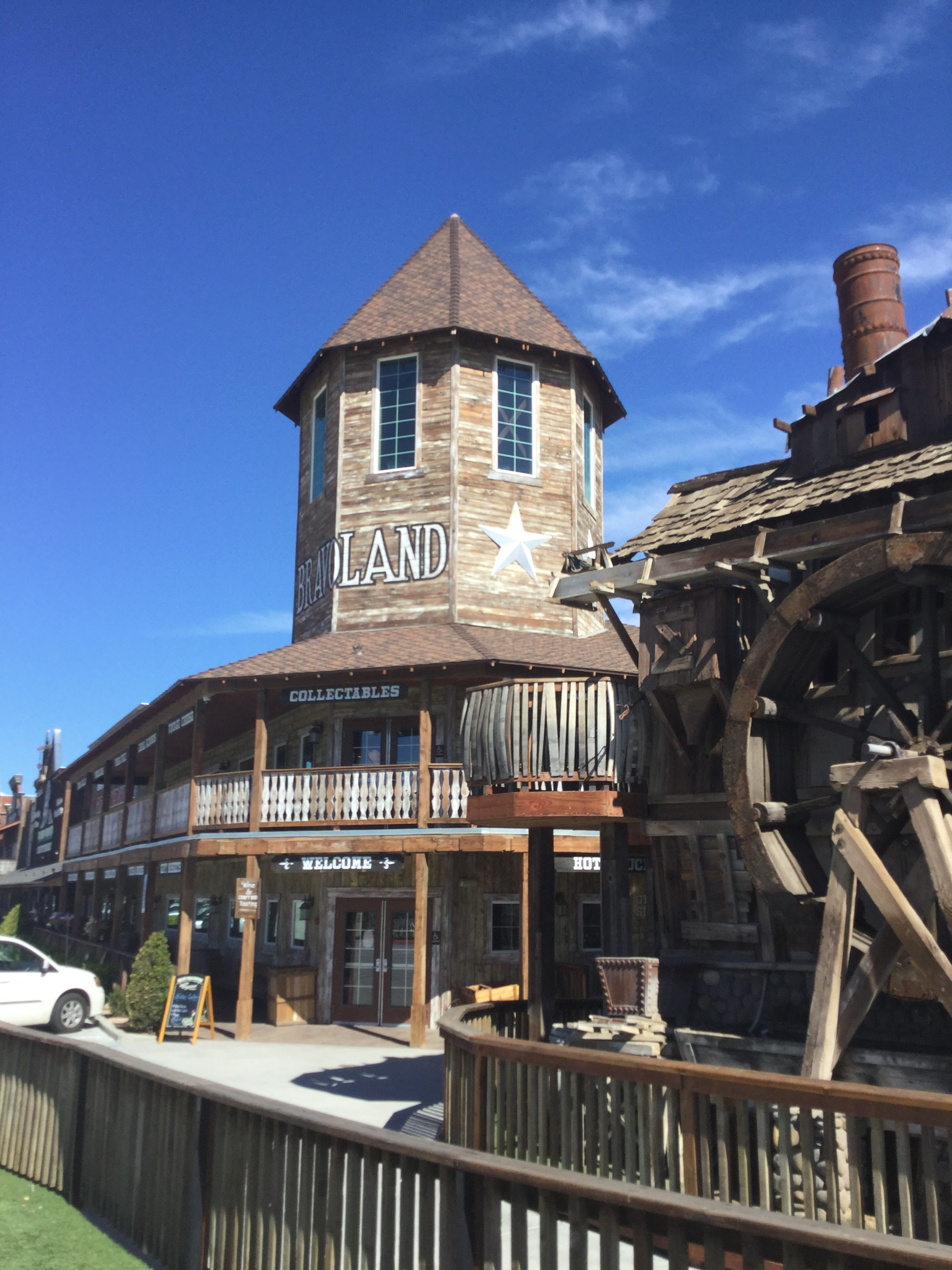
Bravoland in Kettleman City

The Kettleman Hills were named after Dave Kettelman (with a change in spelling), a pioneer sheep-raiser and cattleman who grazed his animals there in the 1860s. Kettleman Hills in the early 1900s was a crossing for people who would travel from Lemoore to Kettleman City by ferry. As the Tulare Lake receded in the late 1920s, this stretch between the two cities became State Route 41.

Oil was discovered in the Kettleman Hills in 1928, at the Kettleman North Dome Oil Field, which became one of the most productive oil fields in the United States in the early 1930s. Reportedly, thousands of spectators came to see the gusher that spouted almost pure gasoline for weeks.

A. Manford Brown, a real estate developer, founded the town of Kettleman City in 1929. He donated land for a school and for the community church. The main street (State Route 41) was called Brown Street after him. The first post office opened in 1929. A branch library was established in 1930. By 1940, Kettleman City had a population of about 600.

The early 1970s saw two substantial projects that had significant impacts on the community: the completion of the California Aqueduct and the opening of Interstate 5. The facility operated by Waste Management, Inc. opened in the late 1970s.

Despite the name, Kettleman City is not an incorporated city and remains a census-designated place.

== Transportation ==
=== Major highways ===
- Interstate 5
- State Route 41

=== Public transportation ===
Kings Area Regional Transit's (KART) Hanford-Avenal route serves Kettleman City. KART also provides vanpool service for commuters and Dial-A-Ride (demand response) services throughout Kings County as well as to Fresno.

FlixBus stops approximately 16 miles away in Avenal.

== Demographics ==
Historical population
Census	Pop.	Note	%±
1980	1,051		—
1990	1,411		34.3%
2000	1,499		6.2%
2010	1,439		−4.0%
2020	1,242		−13.7%
U.S. Decennial Census; 1850–1870 1880-1890; 1900 1910 1920; 1930 1940 1950; 1960 1970 1980; 1990 2000 2010

Kettleman City first appeared as a census designated place in the 1980 United States census.

=== 2020 census ===
As of the 2020 census, Kettleman City had a population of 1,242. The median age was 28.4 years. 33.5% of residents were under the age of 18 and 8.1% of residents were 65 years of age or older. For every 100 females there were 105.6 males, and for every 100 females age 18 and over there were 108.6 males age 18 and over.

0.0% of residents lived in urban areas, while 100.0% lived in rural areas.

There were 341 households in Kettleman City, of which 56.0% had children under the age of 18 living in them. Of all households, 46.0% were married-couple households, 20.2% were households with a male householder and no spouse or partner present, and 25.8% were households with a female householder and no spouse or partner present. About 12.3% of all households were made up of individuals and 3.3% had someone living alone who was 65 years of age or older.

There were 366 housing units, of which 6.8% were vacant. The homeowner vacancy rate was 0.0% and the rental vacancy rate was 3.2%.

Racial composition as of the 2020 census
Race	Number	Percent
White	214	17.2%
Black or African American	2	0.2%
American Indian and Alaska Native	17	1.4%
Asian	2	0.2%
Native Hawaiian and Other Pacific Islander	0	0.0%
Some other race	819	65.9%
Two or more races	188	15.1%
Hispanic or Latino (of any race)	1,206	97.1%

=== 2010 census ===
As of the census of 2010, there were 1,439 people, The population density was 6,819.9 inhabitants per square mile (2,633.2/km^{2}). The racial makeup of Kettleman City was 478 (33.2%) White, 4 (0.3%) African American, 8 (0.6%) Native American, 1 (0.1%) Asian, 0 (0.0%) Pacific Islander, 887 (61.6%) from other races, and 61 (4.2%) from two or more races. Hispanic or Latino of any race were 1,383 persons (96.1%).

The Census reported that 1,439 people (100% of the population) lived in households, 0 (0%) lived in non-institutionalized group quarters, and 0 (0%) were institutionalized.

There were 350 households, out of which 232 (66.3%) had children under the age of 18 living in them, 177 (50.6%) were opposite-sex married couples living together, 82 (23.4%) had a female householder with no husband present, 41 (11.7%) had a male householder with no wife present. There were 42 (12.0%) unmarried opposite-sex partnerships, and 3 (0.9%) same-sex married couples or partnerships. 30 households (8.6%) were made up of individuals, and 11 (3.1%) had someone living alone who was 65 years of age or older. The average household size was 4.11. There were 300 families (85.7% of all households); the average family size was 4.34.

The population was spread out, with 553 people (38.4%) under the age of 18, 157 people (10.9%) aged 18 to 24, 415 people (28.8%) aged 25 to 44, 235 people (16.3%) aged 45 to 64, and 79 people (5.5%) who were 65 years of age or older. The median age was 25.5 years. For every 100 females, there were 105.0 males. For every 100 females age 18 and over, there were 106.0 males.

There were 367 housing units at an average density of 1,739.3 per square mile (671.5/km^{2}), of which 135 (38.6%) were owner-occupied, and 215 (61.4%) were occupied by renters. The homeowner vacancy rate was 0.7%; the rental vacancy rate was 1.4%. 564 people (39.2% of the population) lived in owner-occupied housing units and 875 people (60.8%) lived in rental housing units.

=== 2000 census ===
As of the census of 2000, there were 1,499 people, 320 households, and 289 families residing in the CDP. The population density was 8,691.4 inhabitants per square mile (3,355.8/km^{2}). There were 329 housing units at an average density of 1,907.6 per square mile (736.5/km^{2}). The racial makeup of the CDP was 26.62% White, 0.40% Black or African American, 1.87% Native American, 66.18% from other races, and 4.94% from two or more races. It is noteworthy that 92.73% of the population were Hispanic or Latino of any race.

Kettleman City is predominantly a Spanish-speaking community. At the time of the 2000 census, 93.5% of residents spoke Spanish at home, and 41.0% of this group spoke English "well" or "very well." 6.5% of residents spoke only English at home, and 55.1% spoke English "not well" or "not at all."

There were 320 households, out of which 63.1% had children under the age of 18 living with them, 67.2% were married couples living together, 15.3% had a female householder with no husband present, and 9.4% were non-families. 1.6% of all households were made up of individuals, and 0.3% had someone living alone who was 65 years of age or older. The average household size was 4.68 and the average family size was 4.59.

In the CDP, the population was spread out, with 36.3% under the age of 18, 15.6% from 18 to 24, 29.0% from 25 to 44, 14.8% from 45 to 64, and 4.3% who were 65 years of age or older. The median age was 24 years. For every 100 females, there were 123.1 males. For every 100 females age 18 and over, there were 125.2 males.

The median income for a household in the CDP was $22,409, and the median income for a family was $21,955. Males had a median income of $16,619 versus $10,179 for females. The per capita income for Kettleman City was only $7,389 - about a third of California's average of $22,711. Significantly, about 38.6% of families and 43.7% of the population were below the poverty line, including 52.7% of those under age 18 and none of those age 65 or over.

== Politics ==
In the California State Legislature, Kettleman City is in the 16th senatorial district, represented by Democrat Melissa Hurtado, and in the 33rd Assembly district, represented by Republican Alexandra Macedo. Federally, Kettleman City is located in California's 22nd District and is represented by Republican David Valadao. Kettleman City is represented on the Kings County Board of Supervisors by Richard Valle of Corcoran.

== Economy ==
The junction of Interstate 5 and State Route 41 is surrounded by commercial development that primarily serves through travelers on the highways. Kettleman City is one of the most popular rest stops between the Los Angeles metropolitan area and San Francisco Bay Area and includes restaurants, gas stations, and electric vehicle charging stations. The junction's Tesla Supercharger station was the first to have a solar array roof and an indoor lounge. It initially had 40 chargers—the most of any in Tesla's network—when it opened in 2017.

Many local residents are employed in agriculture, which experienced significant growth on the west side of the San Joaquin Valley after the completion of the California Aqueduct in the early 1970s. However, the community was impacted by the Great Recession as well as drought and restrictions on pumping from the Sacramento River delta to protect endangered species. The estimated unemployment rate was 9.7% in November 2016.

== Water ==
The community's water system is supplied by two wells operated by the Kettleman City Community Services District. The water is treated to remove benzene.

The water contains naturally occurring arsenic in excess of the maximum contaminant level adopted by the U.S. Environmental Protection Agency. The federal standard is 10 micrograms of arsenic per liter of water. In a public notice issued to residents on January 29, 2010, the District reported that the average arsenic concentration from these wells during the 4th Quarter of 2009 ranged from 12.7 to 16.1 micrograms per liter. For several years, the Kings County government has been working with the District to secure funding to construct a water treatment plant that would be supplied by the California Aqueduct.

== Hazardous waste facility ==
The Kettleman Hills Hazardous Waste Facility is a 5,700,000-cubic-yard (4,400,000 m^{3}) capacity, hazardous, and municipal solid waste disposal facility operated by Chemical Waste Inc., a subsidiary of Waste Management, Inc. The 1,500-acre (610 ha) site is situated 35.9624°N 120.0102°W, 3.5 mi (5.6 km) southwest of Kettleman City on State Route 41.

In 2007 and 2008, the environmental justice organization Greenaction announced that it had discovered a cluster of birth defects and infant deaths in Kettleman City. Greenaction contends that these health issues are linked to toxic chemical releases from several pollution sources in the area, including the Kettleman Hills Hazardous Waste Facility. When the facility requested permission to expand its landfill by 14 acres, the low-income, largely Latino community of 1,500 residents took a stand against the expansion, fearing that the introduction of more PCB waste could increase the incidence of infant maladies.

Chemical Waste Inc., contends that it has passed its standards inspections, and the requirements for inspection. It also contends that there has been no established link between the facility and the defects, and that it is a large economic factor and employer in the community of Kettleman City as well as Kings County. On July 2, 2013, the California Department of Toxic Substances Control released a draft decision on a permit modification that would allow Waste Management. Inc. to increase the capacity of the hazardous waste landfill. On May 21, 2014, that agency issued a final permit approving the company's planned expansion to allow an additional 5.2 million metric tons of capacity. Two appeals of the permit issuance were filed by Greenaction and other groups opposing the expansion. On October 14, 2014, the Department of Toxic Substances Control denied both appeals. Bradley Angel of Greenaction was quoted as saying that his group would continue to challenge the permit with a lawsuit and by filing administrative civil rights complaints in the courts.

== Education ==
Reef-Sunset Unified School District operates the Kettleman City Elementary School.
