= Chalk Mountain =

Chalk Mountain may refer to:

- Chalk Mountain (Churchill County, Nevada), a summit
- Chalk Mountain, Texas, an unincorporated community

== See also ==
- Chalk Mountains (disambiguation)
