= Navajo (disambiguation) =

The Navajo are a Native American people of the Southwestern United States.

Navajo or Navaho may also refer to:

- Navajo Nation, the governmental entity of the Navajo people
- Navajo language, spoken in the Southwestern United States

== Places in the United States ==
- Navajo, New Mexico
- Navajo, San Diego
- Navajo Church, a landform in New Mexico
- Navajo City, New Mexico
- Navajo County, Arizona
- Navajo Generating Station, a coal-fired powerplant
- Navajo Peak, Colorado
- Navajo Peak (Archuleta County, Colorado)
- Navajo Reservoir
- Navajo Springs, Arizona

== Others ==
- Navajo (film), a 1952 documentary film
- Navajo (train), one of the named passenger trains of the Atchison, Topeka and Santa Fe Railway
- The Navajo (sleeper car), a sleeping car on the Super Chief passenger train
- Alfa Romeo Navajo concept car
- Mazda Navajo, a rebadged version of the Ford Explorer, introduced in 1991
- Navajo Sandstone, a geologic formation in the Glen Canyon Group
- Navajo-Churro sheep, a breed of sheep
- Piper PA-31 Navajo, a light, twin engine airplane
- SM-64 Navaho, an experimental cruise missile
- USS Navajo, the name of more than one United States Navy ship
- "Navajo", a 1903 piece of popular music by Egbert Van Alstyne
- The Navajos, a subgroup of the anti-Nazi Edelweiss Pirates
