= Pam Dawber =

American actress (born 1951)

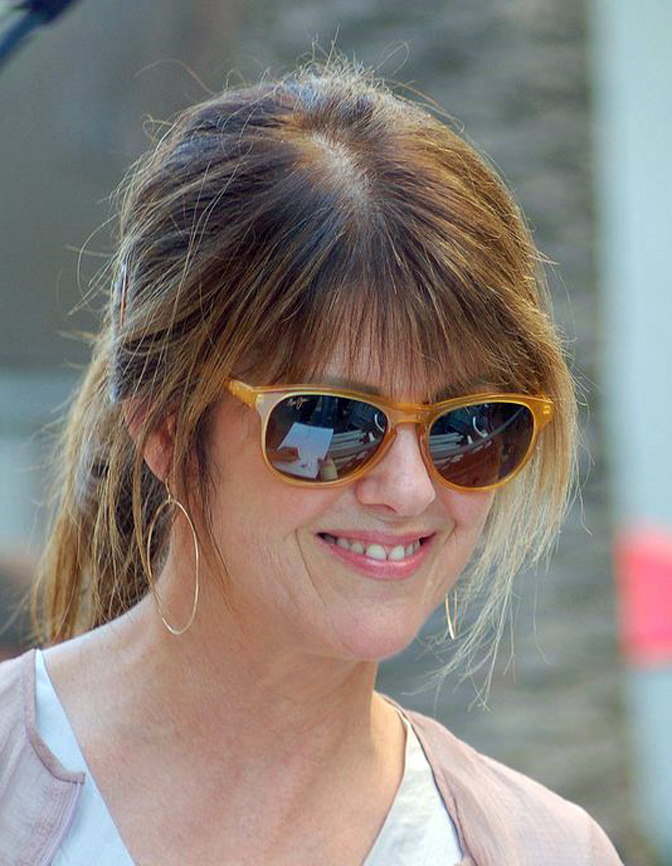
- Dawber in 2012
- Born: Pamela Dawber; October 18, 1951 (age 74); Detroit, Michigan, U.S.
- Occupations: Actress, singer
- Years active: 1978–present
- Spouse: Mark Harmon (m. 1987)
- Children: 2

Pamela Dawber (born October 18, 1951) is an American actress known for her lead television sitcom roles as Mindy McConnell on Mork & Mindy (1978–1982) and Samantha Russell on My Sister Sam (1986–1988).

== Early life ==
Dawber was born in Detroit, the elder of two daughters of Thelma M. (née Fisher) and Eugene E. Dawber, a commercial artist. She went to Reid Elementary School in Goodrich and attended North Farmington High School and Oakland Community College (OCC), with the intention of transferring to a four-year college.

== Career ==
Dawber moved to New York City and was initially a fashion model with Wilhelmina Models before switching to acting. She appeared in several television commercials during the 1970s (Fotomat, Noxzema, Neet, Underalls, etc.).

Dawber screen-tested for the title role in Tabitha, a 1977 to 1978 situation comedy spun off from Bewitched, but the role instead went to Lisa Hartman. However, ABC executives were impressed enough with her to enroll her in the company's "talent development" program, which paid its participants until they could find appropriate roles. Garry Marshall recruited her from this program.

=== Breakthrough: Mork & Mindy ===
Dawber's professional breakthrough came when Marshall chose her, despite her having relatively little acting experience and not having auditioned for the part, as one of the two title characters of the ABC sitcom Mork & Mindy, which ran from 1978 to 1982. She portrayed Mindy McConnell, the comedic foil and eventual love interest for the extraterrestrial Mork from the planet Ork, played by a then-unknown Robin Williams. The show was very popular in its debut season, when it averaged at number three in the Nielsen ratings for the year.

=== The Pirates of Penzance ===
Dawber sang in a 1980s Los Angeles Civic Light Opera production of Gilbert & Sullivan's The Pirates of Penzance, based on the Joseph Papp / New York Shakespeare Festival production. Her role, as Mabel, had been played by Linda Ronstadt in the New York run of the show. In mid-1982, Dawber performed the role of Mabel at the Minskoff Theatre in New York.

=== My Sister Sam ===
From 1986 to 1988, Dawber again had a title role in a television series, playing Samantha Russell in the CBS sitcom My Sister Sam, co-starring Rebecca Schaeffer. The series was a success in its first season, but it suffered a ratings drop in its second after moving to Saturday night. My Sister Sam was cancelled in April 1988, with half of the second season's episodes never shown on CBS. They were eventually broadcast (along with all previous episodes) on USA Network.

In July 1989, over a year after the show's cancellation, Schaeffer was shot and killed in front of her apartment in Los Angeles by Robert John Bardo, an obsessed fan who had stalked her for three years. Dawber was reportedly "devastated" by her former co-star's death. Dawber and her other surviving My Sister Sam co-stars – Joel Brooks, David Naughton and Jenny O'Hara – all participated in a filmed public service announcement about gun violence prevention, and Dawber herself became a gun control advocate.

=== Film work ===
Although mostly known for her television work, Dawber has starred in several films, including the comedy movie Stay Tuned (1992) with John Ritter and the period movie I'll Remember April (1999), alongside husband Mark Harmon.

=== Return to television ===
In 1997, Dawber starred in the short-lived sitcom Life... and Stuff on CBS.

In 2014, she reunited with Robin Williams on his comedy series The Crazy Ones as a love interest of Williams's character. The reunion failed to improve ratings, and the series was canceled shortly afterwards. Williams, already suffering from Lewy body disease by this time, died by suicide later that year.

Dawber is a national spokeswoman for Big Brothers Big Sisters of America. In 2016 Dawber made a guest appearance on The Odd Couple in a tribute episode to Marshall, along with other Marshall alumni such as Ron Howard, Garry's sister Penny Marshall, Cindy Williams, Anson Williams, Don Most and Marion Ross.

She appeared with her husband, fellow actor Mark Harmon, on CBS's NCIS in 2021 for seven episodes as "seasoned investigative journalist" Marcie Warren.

== Personal life ==
Dawber married actor Mark Harmon on March 21, 1987, in a private ceremony. They have two sons: one born in 1988 and another in 1992.

== Filmography ==
Television
Year	Title	Role	Notes
1978	Sister Terri	Sister Terri	TV film
1978–1982	Mork & Mindy	Mindy McConnell / Mandy	Main cast
1979	The Chevy Chase National Humor Test	Various	TV special
1980	The Girl, the Gold Watch & Everything	Bonny Lee Beaumont	TV film
1982	Mork & Mindy/Laverne & Shirley/Fonz Hour	Mindy McConnell	Main cast, voice role
1982	Twilight Theatre	Missy	TV film (segment "Jilted Johnny")
1982	Remembrance of Love	Marcy Rabin	TV film
1983	Through Naked Eyes	Anne Walsh	TV film
1984	Last of the Great Survivors	Laura Matthews	TV film
1985, 1987	Faerie Tale Theatre	Self, Pearl	Episode: "Grimm Party" (interviews of cast), Episode: "The Little Mermaid"
1985	The Twilight Zone	Karen Billings	Episode: "But Can She Type?" segment
1985	This Wife for Hire	Marsha Harper	TV film
1985	Wild Horses	Daryl Reese	TV film
1985	American Geisha	Gillian Burke	TV film
1986–1988	My Sister Sam	Samantha 'Sam' Russell	Main cast
1988	Rosie	Shelby Woods	Episode: "Shelby by the Moon"
1988	Quiet Victory: The Charlie Wedemeyer Story	Lucy Wedemeyer	TV film
1989	Do You Know the Muffin Man?	Kendra Dollison	TV film
1990	The Face of Fear	Connie Weaver	TV film
1991	Rewrite for Murder	?	TV film
1993	The Man with Three Wives	Robyn	TV film
1994	Dream On	Cheryl Castorini	Episode: "From Here to Paternity"
1994	Web of Deception	Ellen Benesch	TV film
1994	A Child's Cry for Help	Monica Shaw	TV film
1994	The Bears Who Saved Christmas	Mom	TV film, voice role
1995	Aaahh!!! Real Monsters	Wife	Episode: "Chip Off the Old Beast / The War's Over", voice role
1995	Trail of Tears	Cheryl Harris	TV film
1995	Kevin's Kitchen	?	TV film
1996	Adventures from the Book of Virtues	Liese	Episode: "Self-Discipline", voice role
1996	A Stranger to Love	Andie	TV film
1997	Life... and Stuff	Ronnie Boswell	Main cast
1997–1998	101 Dalmatians: The Series	Perdita	Recurring role, voice role
1998	Men in Black: The Series	?	Episode: "The Elle of My Dreams Syndrome", voice role
1999	Don't Look Behind You	Liz Corrigan	TV film
2006	Christa McAuliffe: Reach for the Stars	Herself	TV documentary
2014	The Crazy Ones	Lily	Episode: "Love Sucks"
2016	The Odd Couple	Arnette	Episode: "Taffy Days"
2021	NCIS	Marcie Warren	Recurring role (seasons 18–19)

Film
Year	Title	Role	Notes
1978	A Wedding	Tracy Farrell	
1981	Swan Lake	Princess Odette	Voice role
1992	Stay Tuned	Helen Knable	
1999	I'll Remember April	Barbara Cooper	
