= Avenal State Prison =

Male-only state prison in California, US

Avenal State Prison (ASP)
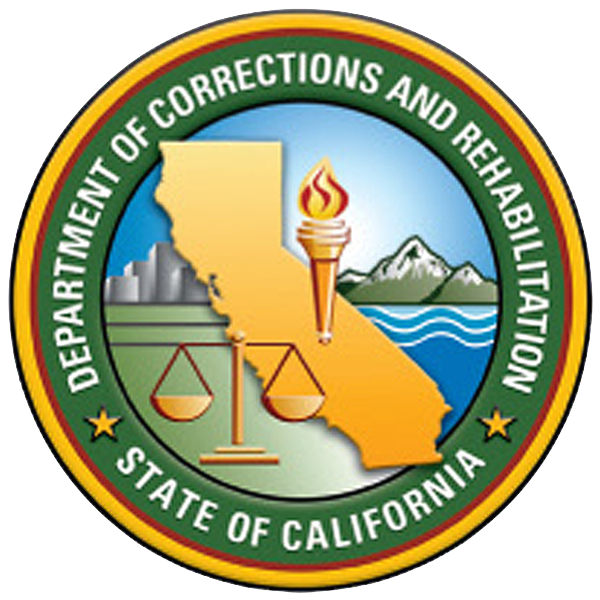
- Aerial View
- Interactive map of Avenal State Prison (ASP)
- Location: Avenal, California, U.S.; 35.975°N 120.120°W
- Status: Operational
- Security class: Minimum-medium
- Capacity: 2,909
- Population: 4789 (164.6% capacity) (February 7, 2024)
- Opened: January 1987
- Managed by: California Department of Corrections and Rehabilitation
- Warden: Martin Gamboa

Avenal State Prison (ASP) is a male-only state prison in the city of Avenal, Kings County, California, United States.

== Facilities ==
The structures on ASP's 640 acres (260 ha) include "17 open dorm buildings, six 200-bed open dorm E-bed buildings, six converted gymnasiums, a 100-cell administrative segregation unit, and a 10-bed firehouse." It is a "low-medium security" or "Level II" prison with "open dormitories with secure perimeter fences and armed coverage." Inmate programs include: Narcotics Anonymous, Alcoholics Anonymous, SAP, autobody, metal fabrication, plumbing and electrical, PIA furniture, warehouse and egg production.

== Population, staffing and budget ==
As of fiscal year 2006/2007, ASP had 1,603 staff and an annual budget of $136 million. ASP has in the past been described as the "most overcrowded prison in the state [of California]"; its September 2007 occupancy rate was 259.7%.

As of April 30, 2020, Avenal was incarcerating people at 143.7% of its design capacity, with 4,197 occupants.

== History ==
Location of Avenal within Kings County, and location of Kings County within California

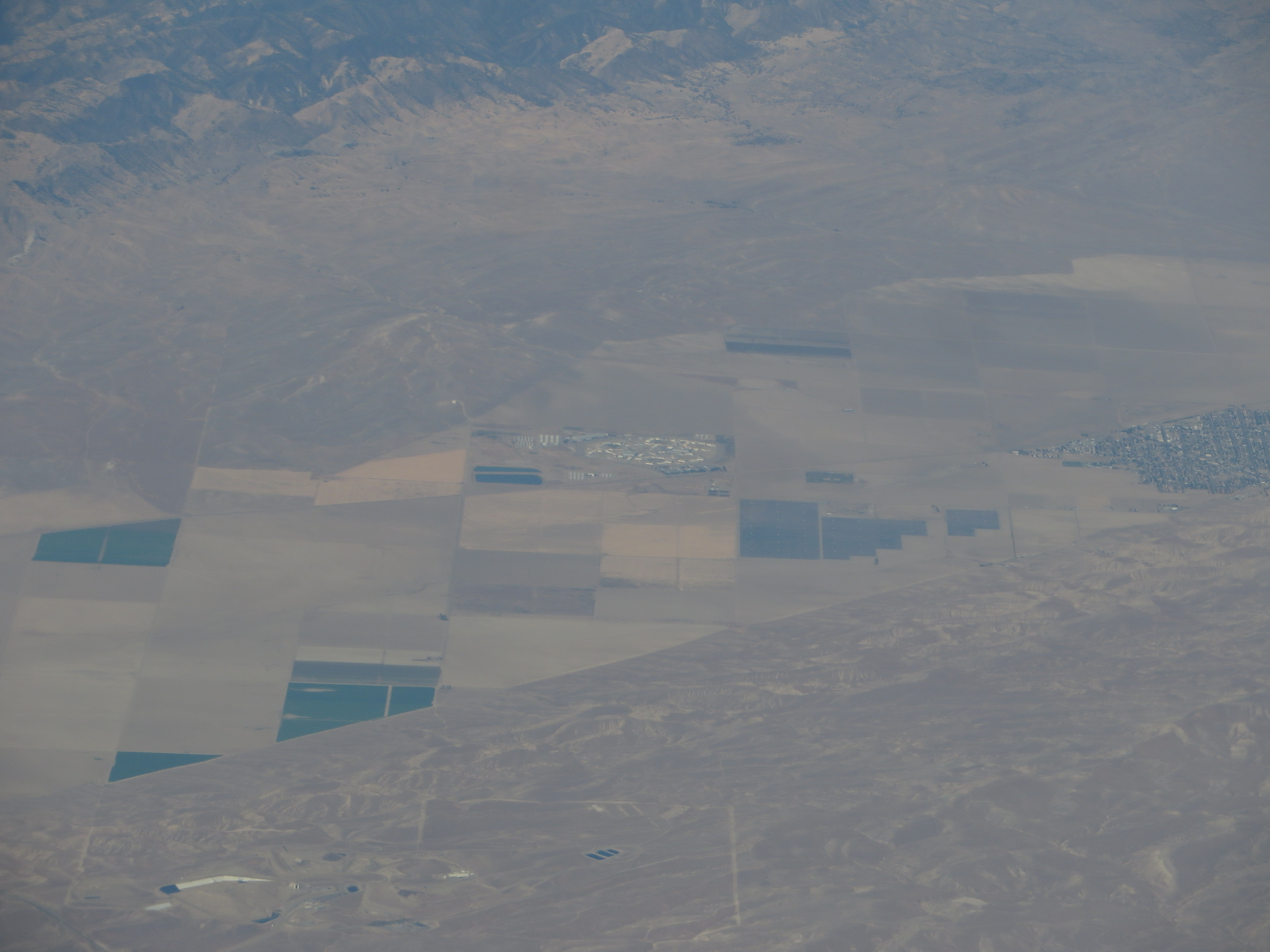
Aerial photo of ASP, 2015

In the early 1980s, "almost everyone" in the town of Avenal desired the prison to be built to improve the economic status of the town. It was reportedly "the first prison to be solicited by a local community." As of 1984, the plans were to build "the largest enclosed security compound in the nation."

Despite some opposition, Governor George Deukmejian signed a bill into law in September 1985 to authorize "$117 million from existing prison construction funds to build the prison", and groundbreaking occurred in December 1985. The first inmates arrived in January 1987.

According to newspaper articles, the original name of the prison was "California Correctional Institution at Avenal", which the Kings County Board of Supervisors changed to "Avenal State Prison" in December 1987. According to the CDCR Web site, ASP "was originally known as Kings County State Prison. On February 22, 1988, it was officially named Avenal State Prison."

In 2001, a trap–neuter–return program was begun for feral cats that had lived on the prison grounds since it was built. ASP officials stopped the program (in February 2005) due to a perceived lack of effectiveness. Subsequently, "the prison traps cats and volunteers are allowed to pick them up at the prison." The organization Feral Paws Rescue continues to advocate for reinstatement of the trap–neuter–return program.

In 2005/2006, ASP and Pleasant Valley State Prison (PVSP) were "particularly affected" by valley fever, with "150 new cases from PVSP and 30 from ASP" in 2005 and 514 at PVSP and 91 at ASP in 2006.

The receiver of the California state prison health care system blamed three deaths among ASP inmates in December 2006 on a "complete breakdown in medical care coverage."

As of October 31, 2020, Avenal State Prison had seen 2,881 cases of COVID-19 and 8 deaths.

== Notable inmates ==
- Robert John Bardo (born 1970) – the murderer of Rebecca Schaeffer
- Gerald Parker (born 1955) – serial killer; was held during trial
- Billy Preston (1946–2006) – musician sentenced for cocaine possession, violation of probation, and insurance fraud
- Robert Chan (born 1975) – one of the murderers of Stuart Tay. Serving a Life Sentence.
