= Chalk Mountains =

Chalk Mountains may refer to:

- Chalk Mountains (California) in Humboldt County, California, USA
- Chalk Mountains (Colorado) in Archuleta County, Colorado, USA
- Chalk Mountains (Texas) in Brewster County, Texas, USA

== See also ==
- Chalk Hills in Los Angeles, California, USA
- Chalk Buttes in Kings County, California, USA
