= Ricardo López (stalker) =

Uruguayan-American stalker (1975–1996)

- López in a video diary from January 17, 1996
- Born: January 14, 1975; Montevideo, Uruguay
- Died: September 12, 1996 (aged 21); Hollywood, Florida, U.S.
- Cause of death: Suicide by gunshot
- Body discovered: September 16, 1996
- Other name: Björk stalker
- Occupation: Exterminator
- Years active: 1993–1996
- Known for: Stalking and sending a sulfuric acid letter bomb to the Icelandic musician Björk
- Status: Deceased
- Motive: Racism; Obsession with Björk

Details
- Victims: Björk (stalking, failed acid attack attempt)
- Killed: 1 (himself)
- Injured: 0
- Weapons: Sulfuric acid letter bomb; Stainless-steel .38-caliber Taurus Model 82 revolver

Ricardo López (January 14, 1975 – September 12, 1996) was a Uruguayan-American man known for stalking and planning an acid attack against Icelandic singer Björk via letter bomb, while videotaping himself in his apartment for months before committing suicide by gunshot on camera.

López was born in Montevideo, Uruguay. He moved to Lawrenceville, Georgia, United States, with his family at a young age, and began working as a pest exterminator. He had poor self-esteem, was socially reclusive, and eventually developed an obsession with Björk in 1993. Though he did not hope to be sexually intimate with her, he was particularly angry over her brief relationship with the English jungle producer Goldie, due to him being mixed-race. Over the course of nearly nine months in 1996, he made video diaries about her and other topics, at his apartment in Hollywood, Florida.

On September 12, 1996, López mailed a letter bomb, rigged with sulfuric acid, to Björk's residence in London. He recorded a final video diary explaining his motivations, and ended it by filming his suicide by gunshot. Local police found his body and the videos four days after his death and contacted Scotland Yard, who located the bomb in a London postal sorting office. The parcel was safely detonated and Björk was unharmed.

== Early life ==
Ricardo López was born in Montevideo, Uruguay, on January 14, 1975, into a middle-class family, which moved to the United States and settled in Lawrenceville, Georgia. He had a good relationship with his family, and was described as easygoing but introverted. He had a few male friends, but no female friends, nor a girlfriend. In a diary found by police, López expressed feelings of shame and inadequacy, as well as feelings of social awkwardness around women. Journalist Paolo Pellegrini wrote that López had been diagnosed with Klinefelter syndrome.

With aspirations to become an artist, López dropped out of high school. However, he did not seriously pursue an artistic career due to his feelings of inferiority, and fear of being denied entry into art school, citing his lack of formal education and "deformed" appearance. He intermittently worked for his brother's pest control business to support himself.

By the age of 17, López had become reclusive and, as a means of escape, became obsessed with celebrities and fantasized. According to his diary, he previously had an obsession with a "well-known U.S. female film star", but expressed anger at her within a few entries after she ended a long-term relationship; journalist Sergio Di Vitantonio identifies the film star as Geena Davis, who gained widespread fame after winning an Academy Award in 1989 and divorced her second husband Jeff Goldblum in 1990. Shortly before delivering the mail bomb, López attended several outpatient treatments for anxiety, but made no mention of his self-esteem issues or violent fantasies to his psychiatrist.

== Obsession with Björk ==
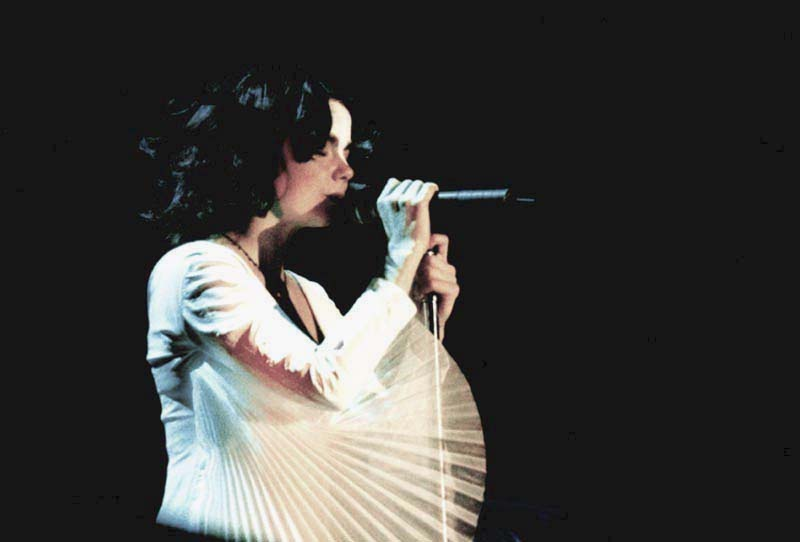
Björk performing in 1997

In 1993, López became fixated on the Icelandic singer Björk. He began gathering information about her life, followed her career, and wrote her numerous fan letters. Initially, López cited her as his muse and said that his infatuation gave him a "euphoric feeling". As time passed, his fixation became all-consuming and he grew more disconnected from reality. In his diary, López wrote of longing to be accepted by Björk and to be a person who had "an effect on her life". He fantasized about inventing a time machine to travel to the 1970s and befriending her as a child. López's fantasies about Björk were not sexual, writing "I couldn't have sex with Björk because I love her". López talked about his infatuation to his friends and brother, who called his interest obsessive and said he should "get a real woman".

López's diary grew to 803 pages, with passages about his thoughts on Björk and his feelings of inadequacy due to being overweight, his disgust and embarrassment about his gynecomastia, and his inability to get a girlfriend. He wrote that he considered himself "a loser who never even learned to drive" and complained about his menial job as an exterminator that earned little money, at times fantasising about becoming a presenter for the MTV Music Awards. The diary contained 168 references to López's feelings of failure, 34 references to suicide, and 14 references to murder. He made 408 references to Björk and 52 references to other celebrities.

== Letter bomb plot ==
In 1996, López was living alone in an apartment in Hollywood, Florida. Around that time, he read in Entertainment Weekly that Björk was in a romantic relationship with another musician, the English jungle producer Goldie. López was angered by the perceived betrayal, and the fact that she was involved with a man, writing in his diary: "I wasted eight months and she has a fucking lover." He began fantasizing about how he could "punish" Björk.

On January 14, 1996, his 21st birthday, López stopped writing his diary and began filming a video diary in his apartment. According to López, the diary's purpose was "... a documentation of my life, of my art and of my plans", and that "comfort is what I seek in speaking to you", referring to the camera as his "psychologist". He recorded eleven video tapes containing approximately two hours of footage each. The tapes contain footage of López preparing his "revenge" and discussing his "crush [that] ended up as an obsession". López's anger over Björk's relationship with Goldie intensified and he decided to kill her.

López made and executed plans to construct a letter bomb in a hollowed-out book, which would activate when the cover was opened. He initially intended to build a more primitive device disguised as an interactive toy with buttons, consisting of two hypodermic needles containing HIV-tainted blood, which he reasoned could be obtained from a prostitute. The original device had two rubber buttons that were to be forcefully pressed down by either thumb which would enable the needles to penetrate through the material and then the operator's skin, whilst doubling as pistons to pressurise and inject the payload.

While this satisfied his desire to have a lasting effect on Björk's life, he eventually realized it would not be biochemically feasible to build such a device. He decided to use sulfuric acid in order to disfigure or kill Björk, to either "be a part of her for the rest of her life" or "[send] her to hell". The bomb was built with the components of a handheld air pistol, powered by a carbon dioxide cartridge which would pressurize a container of sulfuric acid, forcing it through a nozzle and onto the unsuspecting victim. He built the bomb over the course of less than three months, and before packaging it, he wrapped the device in cellophane and attached a forged letter, purportedly from Björk's record label that presented the book inside as part of a "future project". He was going to commit suicide after mailing the bomb out of fear of arrest.

== Death ==
In the early hours of September 12, 1996, López started filming his final video diary entry. The final tape, titled "Last Day – Ricardo López", began with López preparing to go to the post office to mail the letter bomb to Björk's home in London. He said that he was "very, very nervous", but that he would kill himself rather than be arrested if he aroused suspicion. After returning from the post office, he resumed filming. While Björk's music played in the background, a naked López shaved his head and eyebrows with scissors and painted his head red and green with grease paint. Police speculated that López's reason for doing so was either to obscure his identity, or to make himself less recognizable so it would be easier for him to commit suicide. He examined himself in a mirror and told the camera that he was "a little nervous now". He then stated, "I'm definitely not drunk. I am completely am not [sic] depressed. I know exactly what I am doing. [The gun]'s cocked back. It's ready to roll. [...] This death is for you, Björk." He then sits on a chair and starts to prepare to shoot himself. "The chances of it being entirely successful, like I said before." As Björk's cover of "I Remember You" finished playing on a TV next to him, López shouted "Victory!" (Note: Sources variously report López's last words as "Victory!" or "This is for you!") and shot himself through the roof of his mouth with a stainless-steel .38-caliber Taurus Model 82 revolver at 2:54 PM. There was a brief scream that degenerated into groaning as his body fell out of view. Shortly after, he continued to bleed out on the floor, which was audible. The camera continued to film as Lopez lay motionless in his apartment, out of sight of the camera. Then after about 10 minutes, the camera stopped filming as the tape had run out. A sign bearing the hand-painted words "The best of me - Sep 12" was propped on an upturned mattress behind him. Police theorized that López intended to cover the sign with his blood and brain matter with the gunshot, but the gun was insufficiently powerful enough to cause that to happen, rather leaving a visible lump on the vertex of his head. He died from blood loss around 3 pm, seven minutes after shooting himself. Then everything goes quiet and the tape runs out of film and stops filming around 3:03 pm.

Four days later, on September 16, a foul odor and blood were noticed coming from López's apartment by the building manager. The Hollywood Police Department entered his trashed apartment and discovered López's decomposing corpse. Written on the wall was a message: "The 8mm tapes are a documentation of a crime, terrorist material, they are for the FBI." The Broward County Sheriff's Office evacuated the building while the bomb squad searched for further explosives, and found none. After viewing López's final tape, police contacted Scotland Yard to warn them that the potentially explosive package was en route to Björk's residence in London. The package had yet to be delivered, and the Metropolitan Police intercepted it at a South London post office, after which it was safely detonated. There had been little danger of Björk receiving the bomb because her mail was vetted through her management's office. Unbeknownst to López, Björk and Goldie had ended their relationship a few days before he killed himself.

== Aftermath ==
On September 18, outside her home in London, Björk gave a statement to the press, saying that she was very distressed by the incident. She described it as "terrible" and "very sad", and said that people should not "take [her] too literally and get involved in my personal life". She sent a card and flowers to López's family. She left for Spain, where she recorded the remainder of her third album, Homogenic, away from media attention. She also hired security for her son, Sindri, who was escorted to school with a minder. A year after López's death, Björk discussed the incident in an interview: "I was very upset that somebody had died. I couldn't sleep for a week. And I'd be lying if I said it didn't scare the fuck out of me. That I could get hurt and, most of all, that my son could get hurt."

López's family and friends were aware of his obsession with Björk. They maintained that they had no idea that he harbored violent thoughts or was capable of violence. At one point, his brother had told him to "get a real woman, you're obsessed". A psychiatrist who treated López for anxiety shortly before his death also stated that he did not appear dangerous. López's videotapes, including his suicide, were confiscated by the FBI and then were released to journalists.

== In popular culture ==
In 2000, Sami Saif released a 70-minute documentary, The Video Diary of Ricardo López, comprising a condensed version of López's 22-hour video diary. Saif decided to limit its availability as "I want to be there when people see the film, because there are all sorts of things about Ricardo López on the internet. I like to be able to talk to people about what it is they've actually seen."

In 2013, British independent filmmaker Charlie Bambridge made a short narrative film about the final days of Ricardo Lopez entitled ‘The Best of Me’ that toured festivals and is still available on YouTube.

In 2019, independent Italian director Domiziano Cristopharo released an 87-minute erotic horror film titled The Obsessed, with the working title of Last Day: The Best of Me. López's video diary was adapted as the subject material of The Obsessed in what Cristopharo described as "Albania's first horror film" and "a body horror freely inspired to the real story of Ricardo López, Björk's stalker".

== See also ==
- Mark David Chapman, stalked and murdered former Beatle John Lennon in 1980.
- Kevin James Loibl, who murdered American musician Christina Grimmie
- Yolanda Saldívar, president of the fan club and manager of boutiques for singer Selena, whom she murdered in 1995.
- Robert John Bardo, stalked and murdered actress Rebecca Schaeffer in 1989.
- John Hinckley Jr., stalker of actress Jodie Foster, who attempted to kill President Ronald Reagan in an attempt to impress her.
