= Sami Saif =

Danish documentary filmmaker

- Born: Sami Martin Saif; 1972 (age 53–54); Denmark
- Known for: Documentary filmmaker

Sami Martin Saif (born 1972) is a Danish award-winning documentary filmmaker.

Saif graduated from the National Film School of Denmark in 1997 having made the short The UFO War. He then started work on Danish broadcaster DR mainly in the TV Children and Youth Department.

In 2000, Saif directed The Video Diary of Ricardo Lopez, based on the final days of Ricardo Lopez who was obsessed with Icelandic singer-songwriter Björk. He followed it up with the documentary Family co-directed with Phie Ambo, that won Saif and Ambo multiple awards. The film follows Saif's search for his missing father, aided by his then-girlfriend, Phie Ambo. Other films winning or being nominated for awards were Dogville Confessions (2003) and Tommy (2010) about singer, composer and musician Tommy Seebach.

== Filmography ==
Documentaries

- 2000: The Video Diary of Ricardo López (credited as Sami Martin Saif)
- 2001: Family
- 2003: Dogville Confessions (credited as Sami Martin Saif)
- 2006: Mit Danmark
- 2009: Parardis
- 2010: Tommy
- 2016: The Allins

Documentary shorts

- 1995: The UFO War (TV short)
- 2004: American Short (documentary short)
- 2006: Awaiting (documentary short)

Producer

- 2010: Tommy
