= Underalls =

Undergarments company

Underalls was a brand of undergarments for women manufactured by the Hanes hosiery and underwear company of North Carolina and marketed in the United States, Canada, and Mexico from the introduction of the product in 1976 until the halt of production in the early 1990s. The product was noted for being a combination of pantyhose and panties together, presumably to prevent panty lines.

== History ==
Originally founded 1976, Underalls was a brand of undergarments for women manufactured by the Hanes hosiery and underwear company of North Carolina and marketed in the United States, Canada, and Mexico. The original product was noted for being a combination of pantyhose and panties together, to prevent panty lines. These also had different trademarked variations, such as Slenderalls, Coloralls, Summeralls, and Winteralls. Underalls continued to offer pantyhose until the halt of production in the early 1990s.

== Advertising and packaging ==
The name, packaging and the advertising campaign were created by Ilon Specht and Cathy Cook for Case & McGrath Advertising in New York City. The packages were recognizable by their cardboard cutout displaying the name of the product, which was shaped like a pair of buttocks. This was further recognizable at the end of their television commercials when the cardboard cut-out would tilt back and forth one time, accompanied by two identical notes which were referred to as the "boop boop." Early TV commercials promoting Underalls were risqué for their time, featuring a well-built young woman uttering the phrases "Look! I don't wear panties anymore" and "Oh, I love my Underalls...'cause they make me look like I'm not wearin' nothin'". Another risque quote was, "Don't spoil the view." Later ads included a voice saying, "OK America, show us YOUR Underalls!" The 1977 TV commercial, the second in the series featured actress Pam Dawber, prior to her success in Mork & Mindy.
