= My Sister Sam =

American television sitcom (1986–1988)

- Genre: Sitcom
- Created by: Stephen Fischer
- Developed by: Susan Beavers
- Directed by: Peter Bonerz; Zane Buzby; Matthew Diamond; James Gardner; Ellen Gittelsohn; Barnet Kellman; Steve Zuckerman
- Starring: Pam Dawber; Rebecca Schaeffer; Jenny O'Hara; Joel Brooks; David Naughton
- Theme music composer: John Bettis; Steve Dorff
- Opening theme: "Room Enough for Two" performed by Kim Carnes
- Ending theme: "Room Enough for Two" (instrumental)
- Composer: Steve Dorff
- Country of origin: United States
- Original language: English
- No. of seasons: 2
- No. of episodes: 44 (12 unaired)

Production
- Executive producer: Diane English
- Producers: Danny Jacobson; Karyl Miller; Korby Siamis
- Editors: Dann Cahn; Tucker Wiard
- Camera setup: Multi-camera
- Running time: 22 minutes
- Production companies: Pony Productions; Warner Bros. Television

Original release
- Network: CBS
- Release: October 6, 1986 – April 12, 1988

My Sister Sam is an American television sitcom starring Pam Dawber and Rebecca Schaeffer that was produced by Pony Productions and Warner Bros. Television and aired on CBS from October 6, 1986, to April 12, 1988.

== Synopsis ==
The sitcom follows the lives of a 29-year-old San Francisco freelance photographer named Samantha "Sam" Russell and her 16-year-old sister Patti. Sam's life is turned upside down when Patti, who has been living with the sisters' Aunt Elsie and Uncle Bob in rural Oregon after the death of the girls' parents, shows up on Sam's door step and announces that she is going to live with Sam.

The supporting cast includes Sam's neurotic agent Jordan Dylan "J.D." Lucas, Sam's sarcastic assistant Dixie Randazzo and Jack Kincaid, Sam's womanizing photojournalist neighbor who frequently stops by her apartment.

== Cast ==
- Pam Dawber as Samantha "Sam" Russell
- Rebecca Schaeffer as Patricia "Patti" Russell
- Joel Brooks as Jordan Dylan "J.D." Lucas
- Jenny O'Hara as Dixie Randazzo
- David Naughton as Jack Kincaid

== Production ==
The series was created by Stephen Fischer and was developed by Pam Dawber's production company, Pony Productions (in association with Warner Bros. Television). Dawber and her Manager, Mimi Weber, spent three years searching for the most ideal television series project for their company to co-produce, but after screening several of them, Dawber had not found one that truly spoke to her. In the midst of this search, she and Weber produced a few TV movies under the Pony Productions nameplate, in which Dawber played lead roles.

By late 1985, Stephen Fischer and Diane English submitted their screenplay to Dawber and Weber, one centering on the life and times of a young photographer on the fast track who takes in her teenage sister, titled Taking the Town (based on the phrase "taking the town by storm"). At last, Dawber found a fulfilling script, and the creative team (she, Weber, Fischer and English) had the pilot successfully pitched to CBS. The network gave it a berth on its successful Monday night sitcom lineup for its 1986-87 fall schedule, as Taking the Town, with the title changing to My Sister Sam as summer pre-promotions ramped up.

The series was intended to be a starring vehicle for Dawber, who found success on television opposite Robin Williams in the ABC sitcom Mork & Mindy. Dawber later said that she wanted the focus of the show to be on the cast as a whole, stating, "I am not a comedian. I'm a reactor to all the zany people who revolve around me."

My Sister Sam was executive produced by Diane English and Mimi Weber and filmed at The Burbank Studio.

=== Theme song ===
The series' theme song, "Room Enough for Two", was written by Steve Dorff and John Bettis and performed by Kim Carnes. Dorff won a BMI TV Music Award in 1987 for his work on the series.

== Episodes ==
=== Season 1 (1986–87) ===
No. overall	No. in season	Title	Directed by	Written by	Original release date
1	1	"Samantha Russell, Man Stealer"	Ellen Falcon	Gary Murphy & Larry Strawther	October 6, 1986
2	2	"Patti's Party"	Ellen Falcon	Lisa Albert	October 20, 1986
3	3	"Shooting Stars"	Ellen Falcon	Danny Jacobson	October 27, 1986
4	4	"What Makes Samantha Run?"	Ellen Falcon	Tom Palmer	November 3, 1986
5	5	"Roomies"	Ellen Falcon	Karyl Miller & Korby Siamis	November 10, 1986
6	6	"The Aunt Elsie Crisis: Day One"	Ellen Falcon	Karyl Miller	November 24, 1986
7	7	"Teacher's Pet"	Ellen Falcon	Lisa Albert	December 1, 1986
8	8	"Mirror, Mirror on the Wall"	Ellen Falcon	Ramona Schindelheim	December 8, 1986
9	9	"Babes in the Woods"	Tom Cherones	Tom Palmer	December 15, 1986
10	10	"Jingle Bell Rock Bottom"	Ellen Falcon	Diane English	December 22, 1986
11	11	"Club Dread"	Ellen Falcon	Larry Strawther & Gary Murphy	January 12, 1987
12	12	"Anything for a Friend"	Ellen Falcon	Danny Jacobson	January 19, 1987
13	13	"Almost In-Laws"	Ellen Falcon	Lisa Albert	January 26, 1987
14	14	"Go Crazy"	Ellen Falcon	Danny Jacobson	February 2, 1987
15	15	"Another Saturday Night"	Ellen Falcon	Korby Siamis	February 9, 1987
16	16	"Family Business"	Ellen Falcon	Karyl Miller	February 16, 1987
17	17	"Making Up Is Hard to Do"	Ellen Falcon	Dennis Danziger & Ellen Sandler	February 23, 1987
18	18	"If You Knew Susie"	Ellen Falcon	Tom Palmer	March 2, 1987
19	19	"Sister, Can You Spare a Fifty?"	Ellen Falcon	Story by : Karyl Miller & Korby Siamis; Teleplay by : Korby Siamis	March 16, 1987
20	20	"Exposed"	Ellen Falcon	Story by : Ramona Schindelheim & Diane English; Teleplay by : Diane English	April 6, 1987
21	21	"Campaign Contributions"	Ellen Falcon	Ramona Schindelheim	April 13, 1987
22	22	"Fog Bound"	Burt Metcalfe	Story by : Stephen Fischer; Teleplay by : Susan Beavers & Stephen Fischer	May 4, 1987

=== Season 2 (1987–88) ===
No. overall	No. in season	Title	Directed by	Written by	Original release date
23	1	"Goodbye, Steve"	Barnet Kellman	Diane English	October 3, 1987
24	2	"And They Said It Would Never Last"	Barnet Kellman	Diane English	October 10, 1987
25	3	"Deep Throat"	Peter Bonerz	Dennis Danzinger & Ellen Sandler	October 17, 1987
26	4	"Never a Bridesmaid"	Matthew Diamond	Korby Siamus	October 24, 1987
27	5	"Who's Afraid of Virginia Schultz?"	Matthew Diamond	Danny Jacobson	October 31, 1987
28	6	"Drive, She Said"	Peter Bonerz	Tom Palmer	November 7, 1987
29	7	"Revenge of the Russell Sisters"	Peter Bonerz	Danny Jacobson	March 15, 1988
30	8	"Play It Again, Sam"	Peter Bonerz	Karyl Miller	March 22, 1988
31	9	"Ol' Green Eyes Is Back"	Peter Bonerz	Diane English	March 29, 1988
32	10	"Life, Death and Admiral Andy"	Peter Baldwin	Tom Palmer	April 12, 1988
33	11	"It's My Party and I'll Kill If I Want To"	Stephen Zuckerman	Irene Mecchi and Diane English	Unaired
34	12	"Good Neighbor Sam"	Zane Buzby	Tom Palmer	Unaired
35	13	"Patti, I Have a Feeling We're Not in Oregon Anymore"	Zane Buzby	Tom Spezialy	Unaired
36	14	"The Art of Love"	N/A	N/A	Unaired
37	15	"Camp Burnout"	N/A	N/A	Unaired
38	16	"Grand Prize"	Peter Bonerz	Danny Jacobson	Unaired
39	17	"Walk a While in My Shoes"	Stephen Zuckerman	Deborah Zoe Dawson and Victoria Johns	Unaired
40	18	"The Wrong Stuff"	James Gardner	Korby Siamis	Unaired
41	19	"The Thrill of Agony, the Victory of Defeat"	James Gardner	Korby Siamis	Unaired
42	20	"The Good, the Bad and the Auditor"	N/A	N/A	Unaired
43	21	"Earthquake"	Peter Bonerz	Story by : Karyl Miller; Teleplay by : Korby Siamis	Unaired
44	22	"A Day in the Lives"	N/A	N/A	Unaired

== Release ==
My Sister Sam premiered on October 6, 1986, scheduled between Kate & Allie and Newhart, both hit shows for CBS. The series earned solid ratings and was ranked #21 by the end of its first season. Due to its success, CBS renewed the series for a second season. CBS then moved My Sister Sam to Saturday nights opposite The Facts of Life, which was a part of NBC's successful Saturday night comedy lineup. By the end of October 1987, the show's audience had dwindled to one of the lowest on network TV ranking at #71. The series was put on hiatus in November 1987 but remained in production while the network decided its fate.

CBS brought the series back to the air on March 15, 1988, due in part to letters from fans and the 1988 Writers Guild of America strike which affected the production of other television series for CBS and the other two major television networks (NBC, ABC). CBS chose to move My Sister Sam yet again to Tuesday nights. By April, ratings had failed to improve and the series was again pulled from the lineup. CBS announced the series' cancellation in May 1988, leaving 12 episodes of the second season unaired.

=== Syndication ===
After the series was canceled by CBS, the USA Network picked up syndication rights began airing in June 1989, a month before Schaeffer's death and eventually aired all 44 episodes, including 12 aforementioned unaired episodes were never shown on CBS.

=== Home media ===
The show's pilot episode appeared on the bonus disc Warner Bros. 50 Years of TV Commemorative: Volume 2. It was packaged with some releases of Murphy Brown Season 1 DVD set.

== Aftermath ==
On July 18, 1989, more than a year after My Sister Sam had been canceled, series cast member Rebecca Schaeffer was fatally shot in the doorway of her Los Angeles apartment building by Robert John Bardo, an obsessed fan from Tucson, Arizona, who had been stalking her for three years. His obsession with Schaefer began after he saw a commercial for the sitcom. Bardo was later arrested upon returning to his native Tucson the next day. The following month, the surviving cast members reunited to film a public service announcement for the Center to Prevent Handgun Violence in Schaeffer's honor, this would lead to the first anti-stalking law in the United States.

== Reception ==
=== Awards and nominations ===
Awards and nominations for My Sister Sam
Year	Award	Result	Category	Recipient
1987	BMI Film & TV Awards	Won	BMI TV Music Award	Steve Dorff
1987	Primetime Emmy Award	Nominated	Outstanding Costume Design for a Series	Bill Hargate (costume designer) (For episode "Jingle Bell Rock Bottom")
