= Reef-Sunset Unified School District =

School district in California, United States

Address
- 205 North Park Avenue Avenal, California, 93204; United States

District information
- Type: Public
- Grades: K–12
- NCES District ID: 0632270

Students and staff
- Students: 2,728
- Teachers: 113.49
- Staff: 149.8
- Student–teacher ratio: 24.04

Other information
- Website: www.rsusd.org

Reef-Sunset Unified School District is a school district in the Central Valley of California. The district has its headquarters in Avenal. Enrollment is approximately 2664 students.

== Schools ==
Adult schools

- Avenal Adult School (Avenal)

High schools

- Avenal High School (Avenal)
- Sunrise High School (Avenal)

Middle schools

- Reef-Sunset Middle School (Avenal)

Primary schools

- Avenal Elementary School (Avenal)
- Kettleman City Elementary School (Kettleman City, unincorporated area)
- Tamarack Elementary School (Avenal)
