= Robert John Bardo =

American murderer (born 1970)

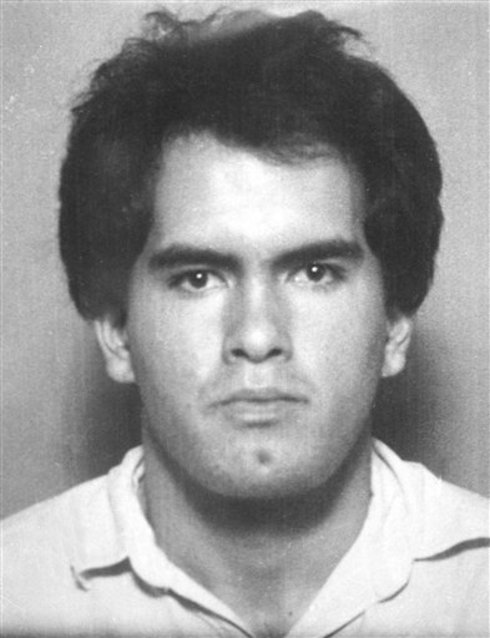
- Mugshot of Bardo
- Born: January 2, 1970 (age 56); Edwards Air Force Base, California, U.S.
- Education: Pueblo Magnet High School (dropped out)
- Known for: Stalking famous celebrities in the 1980s
- Status: Incarcerated
- Conviction: First degree murder with special circumstances
- Penalty: Life imprisonment without the possibility of parole

Details
- Victims: Rebecca Schaeffer
- Date: July 18, 1989; 37 years ago 10:15 am (PDT)
- Locations: Fairfax, Los Angeles, California, U.S.
- Weapon: Ruger GP100 .357 handgun
- Date apprehended: July 19, 1989
- Imprisoned at: Avenal State Prison in Avenal, California

Robert John Bardo (born January 2, 1970) is an American criminal serving life imprisonment without parole after being convicted for the July 18, 1989, murder of American actress and model Rebecca Schaeffer, whom he had stalked for three years.

== Early life ==
Robert John Bardo is the youngest of seven children. His mother June is a native of Japan. His father Philip is an American and was a non-commissioned officer in the United States Air Force, who was stationed in Japan. The family moved frequently and eventually settled in Tucson, Arizona, in 1983. Bardo reportedly had a troubled childhood, being abused by one of his siblings and placed in foster care after he threatened to commit suicide. Bardo's family had a history of mental illness, and he was diagnosed with bipolar disorder.

At the age of 15, Bardo was institutionalized for a month to treat emotional problems. He dropped out of Pueblo Magnet High School in the ninth grade and began working as a janitor at Jack in the Box. In the eighteen months prior to Schaeffer's murder, Bardo had been arrested three times on charges that included domestic violence and disorderly conduct. Bardo's neighbors also said that he had exhibited unexplained strange and threatening behavior toward them.

== Murder ==
Prior to developing an obsession with Schaeffer, Bardo had stalked child peace activist Samantha Smith. These attempts had ultimately failed to establish any contact with Smith. Smith's return home from the Soviet Union had inspired Bardo to travel to Maine to meet her, but a run-in with state police over a traffic offense caused him such concern that he was drawing attention to himself that he was sufficiently discouraged and returned home. Bardo crafted future plans to stalk Smith until her death in a 1985 plane crash. Bardo claimed he turned his attention towards pop stars Tiffany and Debbie Gibson, but neither obsession had percolated into stalking as he later admitted he could not find a feasible way to carry out his plans in New York City.

After writing numerous letters to Schaeffer, Bardo flew to Los Angeles and attempted to gain access to the set of the CBS television series My Sister Sam, in which Schaeffer played a starring role. He brought a huge teddy bear and flowers while he was entering Warner Bros. Studios Burbank (then known as Television Studios Burbank), intending to meet Schaeffer, but was denied entrance by security, who encouraged him to return home. While the studios had a policy that executives and actors were to be notified about uninvited advances toward them, security later admitted that because Bardo had made very little fuss and left when ordered, the encounter was considered too trivial to report to Schaeffer. He returned to Los Angeles more than a month later, this time carrying a knife, and threatened to kill the security personnel but he was ordered to return home.

In 1989, a year after My Sister Sam was canceled due to low ratings, Bardo paid $250 to a detective agency in Tucson to find Schaeffer's home address in the Fairfax District. The agency obtained the address via California Department of Motor Vehicles records. Bardo attempted to buy a handgun in Tucson, but the gun store owner turned him away as he was below the minimum age of 21. He asked his older brother, Edward, to purchase him a Ruger GP100 .357 handgun.

On the night of July 17, Bardo took a Greyhound bus, departed Tucson at 7:00 pm with the handgun in his possession and arrived in Los Angeles at 5:00 am on July 18, when he began canvassing the Fairfax neighborhood. When he arrived at Schaeffer's apartment, the intercom wasn’t working. Schaeffer was awaiting a script from The Godfather Part III, and was scheduled to audition for the role of Mary Corleone later that afternoon. Schaeffer expected the script to be delivered to her doorstep. Bardo presented her an autograph that she had sent him years earlier. He angrily confronted Schaeffer about her performance in Scenes from the Class Struggle in Beverly Hills, a film released a few weeks earlier. To Bardo's eyes, Schaeffer had "lost her innocence" and become "another Hollywood whore". Schaeffer turned Bardo away. After an hour's breakfast at a nearby diner, Bardo returned to Schaeffer's apartment at 10:15 am and rang the doorbell.

When Schaeffer opened the door, Bardo held his handgun in the doorway and was initially intending to give it to Schaeffer saying, "I forgot to give you this." He then shot Schaeffer at point-blank range in the chest after which he fled the scene. Los Angeles police officers arrived at the scene as neighbors rushed to Schaeffer's aid, but Bardo had already fled. Paramedics then rushed Schaeffer to Cedars-Sinai Medical Center via ambulance. She was pronounced dead thirty minutes after arriving. Soon after, Bardo boarded a Greyhound bus to Tucson. He was later spotted at Interstate 10 on July 19, wandering around aimlessly in traffic and planning a suicide attempt. He was arrested and taken to Pima County jail and eventually extradited to California.

Following his capture, Bardo was housed in a sensitive needs unit (SNU) for inmates such as gang members, notorious prisoners, and those convicted of sex crimes. During his 1991 trial, he claimed the U2 song "Exit" was an influence in the murder, and the song was played in the courtroom as evidence (with Bardo lip-synching the lyrics). Bardo's attorneys conceded that he had murdered Schaeffer, but they argued that he was mentally ill. Forensic psychiatrist Park Dietz, testifying for the defense, said that Bardo had schizophrenia and that his illness directly led to his having committed the murder. Bardo was found guilty of first-degree murder and sentenced to life imprisonment without the possibility of parole. According to his 1992 interview on 48 Hours, conducted from his prison cell, Bardo had originally not intended to kill Schaeffer nor harm her if she had followed his orders, so Schaeffer could have saved her life, but his plan was to commit suicide by his own handgun.

Bardo carried a red paperback copy of The Catcher in the Rye when he murdered Schaeffer, which he tossed onto the roof of a building as he fled. He insisted that it was coincidental and that he was not emulating Mark David Chapman, who had also carried a copy of the novel with him when he shot and killed former Beatle John Lennon on December 8, 1980. Chapman later claimed in interviews that he had received letters from Bardo before the murder of Schaeffer, in which Bardo inquired about life in prison.

== Aftermath ==
As a consequence of Bardo's actions and his methods of obtaining Schaeffer's address, the U.S. Congress passed the Driver's Privacy Protection Act, which prohibits state Departments of Motor Vehicles from disclosing the home addresses of state residents. After the murder, the first anti-stalking state laws were enacted in the US, including California Penal Code 646.9.

"Star Struck", an episode of the second season of Law & Order, was partially based on this case.

On July 27, 2007, eighteen years after Schaeffer's death, Bardo was stabbed 11 times on his way to breakfast in the maximum-security unit at Mule Creek State Prison in Amador County, California. Two shivs (inmate-made weapons) were found at the scene. The suspect in the attack was another inmate, serving 82 years to life for second-degree murder.

In 2019, Bardo expressed remorse about killing Schaeffer: "She was irreplaceable. I think about her every day because she should be here. I realize what I've done and I feel a lot of tremendous guilt." As of 2026, he is serving his life sentence at the Avenal State Prison in Avenal, California.

== See also ==
- Yolanda Saldívar, boutiques manager and fan club president of singer Selena, whom she murdered in 1995.
- Ricardo López, man who stalked and attempted to murder Icelandic singer Björk before shooting and killing himself on camera in 1996.
- John Hinckley Jr., stalker of actress Jodie Foster who attempted to kill then-President of the United States Ronald Reagan in 1981 in an attempt to impress her.
- Mark David Chapman, man who stalked and murdered former Beatles member John Lennon in 1980.
- Christina Grimmie, American singer who was murdered by Kevin James Loibl in 2016, who subsequently shot and killed himself.
- Mia Zapata, American singer who was assaulted and murdered in 1993 by Jesus Mezquia after leaving a music venue.
- Judith Barsi, American child actor murdered by her father, József Barsi in 1988, who subsequently shot and killed himself.
- Jared Lee Loughner, stalker of U.S. Congresswoman Gabby Giffords, who attempted to kill Giffords in 2011.
- Monica Seles, Yugoslav-born American tennis player who was stabbed by Günter Parche, stalker of German tennis player Steffi Graf in an attempt to reclaim Graf into the world's top ranking.
