= Scenes from the Class Struggle in Beverly Hills =

1989 film by Paul Bartel

- Theatrical release poster
- Directed by: Paul Bartel
- Screenplay by: Bruce Wagner
- Story by: Bruce Wagner; Paul Bartel
- Produced by: James C. Katz
- Starring: Jacqueline Bisset; Ray Sharkey; Mary Woronov; Robert Beltran; Ed Begley Jr.; Wallace Shawn; Arnetia Walker; Paul Bartel; Rebecca Schaeffer; Paul Mazursky
- Cinematography: Steven Fierberg
- Edited by: Alan Toomayan
- Music by: Stanley Myers
- Production company: North Street Pictures
- Distributed by: Cinecom Pictures
- Release date: June 3, 1989
- Running time: 104 minutes
- Country: United States
- Language: English
- Budget: $3.5 million
- Box office: $2.1 million

Scenes from the Class Struggle in Beverly Hills is a 1989 American black comedy film co-written and directed by Paul Bartel. The film re-unites Bartel with his Eating Raoul co-stars Mary Woronov and Robert Beltran. It also stars Jacqueline Bisset, Ray Sharkey, Ed Begley Jr., Wallace Shawn, Paul Mazursky, and Rebecca Schaeffer. This was Schaeffer's final film appearance to be released (and the only theatrical release) during her lifetime, as it served as the catalyst for her murder by a stalker one month after its release.

The film deals with a widowed television actress, her circle of friends, and her employees. Her planned comeback is sabotaged, when the people around her start bragging to a reporter about their sexual indiscretions. The actress soon starts a romantic relationship with a playwright, while rejecting jealous protests by her husband's ghost.

== Plot ==
Recently widowed Clare, a former television sitcom star, invites her next-door neighbor Lisabeth to stay with her while Lisabeth's house is fumigated. Lisabeth's brother Peter, a playwright, arrives with his new bride To-Bel, an African-American woman. To-Bel had a fling in Hawaii with Howard, Lisabeth's ex-husband, who shows up unexpectedly and begs Lisabeth to take him back. (To-Bel—who had no idea she slept with Lisabeth's ex-husband before marrying her brother—describes the coincidence as "a freaky little act of God.")

Clare's Chicano house attendant Juan owes $5,000 in gambling debts to June-Bug, an Asian gangster. When he is unable to collect the debt, June-Bug slashes Juan's cheek as a warning to pay up. Juan turns to Lisabeth's chauffeur, Frank, for help. Frank bets he can seduce Clare before Juan can bed Lisabeth. Frank agrees to pay $5,000 if Juan wins—on the condition Juan sleeps with him if he loses. Juan accepts Frank's challenge. Frank, unable to seduce Clare, laces her drink with sedatives and tricks Juan into thinking he bedded her. Juan sleeps with Lisabeth but denies it to avoid tarnishing her reputation. Juan honors the bet and sleeps with Frank.

Howard and Lisabeth's teenage son, Willie, has cancer which is in remission. After he confides to Juan he had a wet dream, Juan loans him porno tapes and encourages him to masturbate. To Willie's surprise, To-Bel appears as a leather-clad dominatrix in one of the tapes. The tape inadvertently gets mixed up with one of Clare's old sitcom episodes. When Clare shows it to guests after Sidney's wake—not realizing the tape is pornographic—To-Bel quickly cuts the power to avoid embarrassment. When Willie gives her the tape, To-Bel is so grateful that she agrees to help him lose his virginity by sleeping with him.

Clare attempts a comeback soon after her husband Sidney dies (though she is haunted by his ghost). She has bulimia and enlists help from Mo, a paunchy Beverly Hills weight loss doctor. She invites a reporter for brunch to write a feature about her comeback. The brunch is a disaster: everyone exposes their partners' infidelity or gleefully reveals their own sexual indiscretions. After Clare's housekeeper Rosa frightens her with Aztec philosophy cloaked in New Age babble, the reporter abruptly leaves and Clare accuses everyone of sabotaging her comeback.

Mo persuades Clare and Sidney's much younger daughter, Zandra (who has slept with Frank) to accompany him to Africa— ostensibly on a hunger project, though he warns her they will share a tent there. After Peter sleeps with Clare, To-Bel and Howard rekindle their relationship and leave together. Juan and Lisabeth fall in love and book a romantic holiday. As their limousine is about to leave, June-Bug returns, but Frank gives Juan the money to repay his debt. Sidney's ghost appears again to pester Clare. After she persuades him she must undergo self-improvement alone, Sidney's ghost vanishes for good.

== Cast ==
- Jacqueline Bisset as Clare Lipkin
- Ray Sharkey as Frank
- Mary Woronov as Lisabeth Hepburn-Saravian
- Robert Beltran as Juan
- Ed Begley Jr. as Peter Hepburn
- Wallace Shawn as Howard Saravian
- Arnetia Walker as To-Bel
- Paul Bartel as Dr. Mo Van De Kamp
- Paul Mazursky as Sidney Lipkin
- Rebecca Schaeffer as Zandra Lipkin
- Barret Oliver as Willie Saravian
- Edith Diaz as Rosa
- Jerry Tondo as June-Bug
- Michael Feinstein as himself
- Frank Welker as special vocal effects (voice only)
- Little Richard as himself (uncredited)

== Production ==
Director Paul Bartel said, "What I was aiming for was something between The Marriage of Figaro and Luis Buñuel's The Discreet Charm of the Bourgeoisie. There are no burning offenses we wish to reveal. I just wanted to show the divisions between the upper class and their servants, but in a modern way."

Faye Dunaway was originally cast as Clare Lipkin, but dropped out after delays to the filming dates. Jacqueline Bisset replaced Dunaway.

Exterior scenes were shot at a Brentwood mansion north of Sunset Boulevard, while interior scenes were mostly shot at Begley’s Hancock Park, Los Angeles house.

Cinecom agreed to distribute the film after multiple studios passed, citing the movie’s risky and controversial subject matter. Part of the finance came from the Rank Organisation.

== Critical reception ==
On review aggregator Rotten Tomatoes, Scenes from the Class Struggle in Beverly Hills has an approval rating of 78% based on 9 reviews, with an average rating of 6.3/10.

Writing for the Miami Herald, Ryan Murphy gave a positive review, saying it succeeds as a satire and "plays like a cable version of Dynasty". He also singled out Bisset's performance, writing "Her Clare is the dollop of cream that sits atop Bartel's rich, sinful confection." In contrast, Roger Ebert awarded the film 2 out of 4 stars, writing that the film isn't as shocking as it attempts to be and describing it as "an assortment of put-downs, one-liners and bitchy insults, assigned almost at random to the movie's characters". Ebert compared the film to Down and Out in Beverly Hills, which he considered a "funnier movie about the same terrain".

== Awards ==
Woronov was nominated for a 1989 Independent Spirit Award for Best Supporting Female for her role.

== Home media ==
Scenes from the Class Struggle in Beverly Hills was released on Region 2 German DVD on May 18, 2005 and in Italy with its Italian title, Scene di lotta di classe a Beverly Hills. It was released on DVD and Blu-ray in the United States from Kino Lorber on June 30, 2020.

== In popular culture ==
Just as Scenes from the Class Struggle in Beverly Hills parodies the title of Robert Kramer's 1977 documentary about the Carnation Revolution, Scenes from the Class Struggle in Portugal, the title of the 1996 The Simpsons episode "Scenes from the Class Struggle in Springfield" parodies the title of the 1989 film.
