= Wild Horses (1985 film) =

1985 TV film

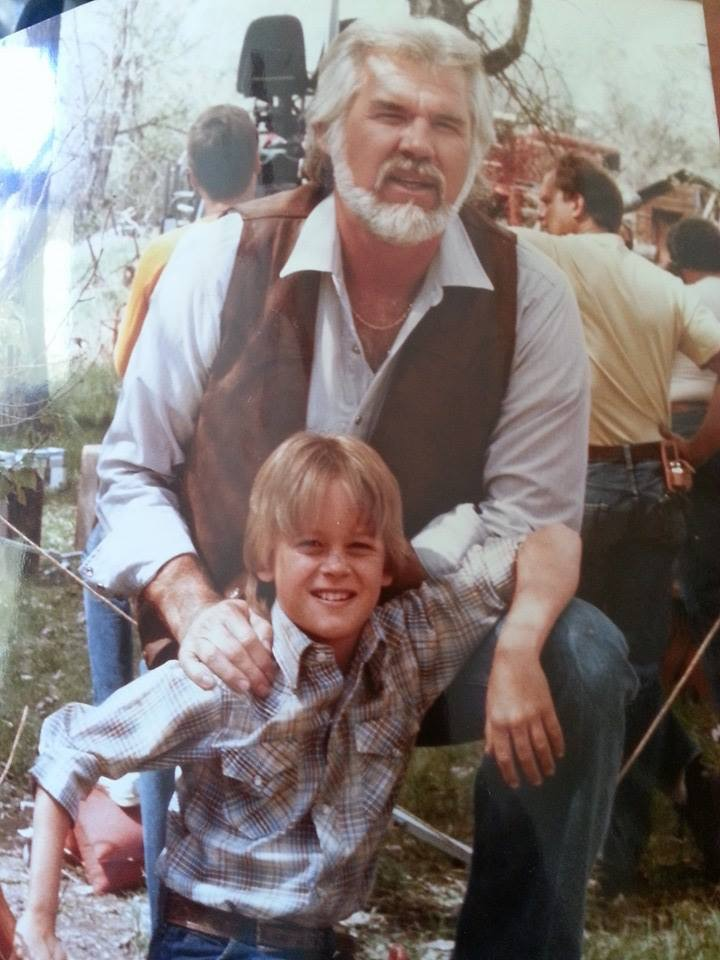
- Kenny Rogers with his nephew on the Wild Horses set in 1985
- Written by: Roderick Taylor; Daniel Vining
- Directed by: Dick Lowry
- Starring: Kenny Rogers; Pam Dawber; Ben Johnson; David Andrews
- Theme music composer: Hans Zimmer
- Country of origin: United States
- Original language: English

Production
- Producer: Hunt Lowry
- Production location: Sheridan, Wyoming
- Cinematography: Keith Wagstaff
- Editor: Byran "Buzz" Brandt
- Running time: 120 minutes
- Production company: Telepictures Productions

Original release
- Network: CBS
- Release: November 12, 1985

Wild Horses is a 1985 American Western television film directed by Dick Lowry and starring Kenny Rogers and Pam Dawber. It originally premiered on CBS on November 12, 1985.

== Plot ==
An over-the-hill rodeo champion (Rogers) gets fired from his assembly line job in Texas. He and a buddy then decide to head to Wyoming to get a job herding mustangs. His wife (Carlson) gives him her blessing, knowing he needs to find something which satisfies his spirit. They sign up for a roundup headed by a veteran cowboy. With the job, he finds himself cross-wise of a corrupt government official, who is making big profits on the illegal sale of wild horses. He also finds himself in the affections of the daughter (Dawber) of an old ranch owner.

== Cast ==
- Kenny Rogers as Matt Cooper
- Pam Dawber as Daryl Reese
- Ben Johnson as Bill Ward
- David Andrews as Dean Ellis
- Richard Masur as Bob Bowne
- Karen Carlson as Ann Cooper
- Richard Farnsworth as Chuck Reese
- Martyn Sanderson as Jones

== See also ==
- List of films about horses
