= Navajo Peak (Archuleta County, Colorado) =

Mountain in the state of Colorado

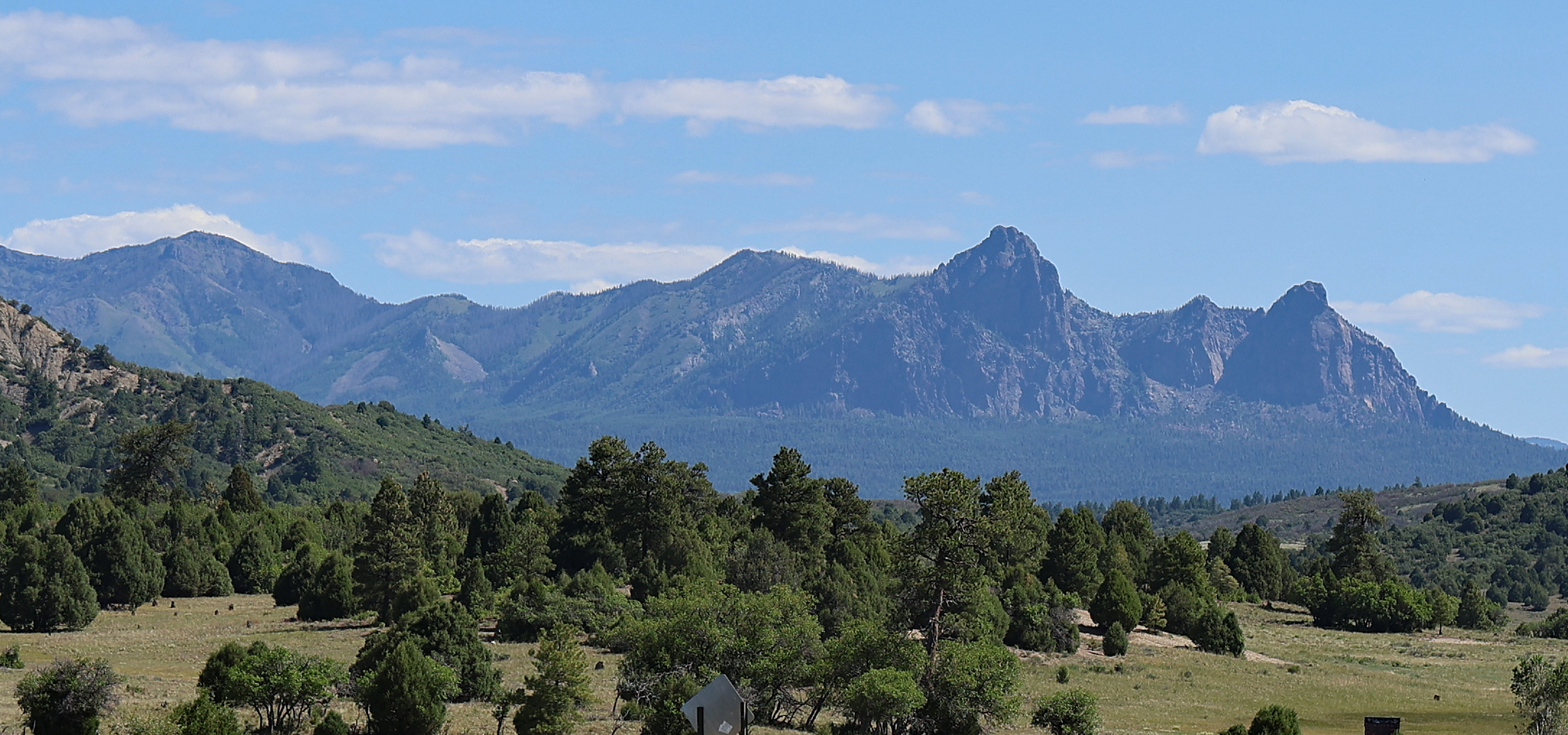
- The mountain's south aspect

Highest point
- Elevation: 11,327 ft (3,452 m)
- Prominence: 325 ft (99 m)
- Isolation: 3.55 mi (5.71 km)
- Coordinates: 37°05′32.74″N 106°44′1.16″W

Geography
- Location within Colorado
- Location: Archuleta County, Colorado, U.S.
- Parent range: Chalk Mountains
- Topo map(s): USGS 7.5' topographic map Chama Peak

Climbing
- Easiest route: hike

Navajo Peak, elevation 11,327 feet (3,452 meters), is a summit in the Chalk Mountains in Archuleta County, Colorado, U.S.

== Public lands and access ==
The peak is within the San Juan National Forest. Also, part of the western side of the peak lies within the South San Juan Wilderness. Navajo Peak Trail #577 lies to the west of the peak but does not go to its summit.
