= USS Navajo =

USS Navajo may refer to more than one United States Navy ship:

- USS Navajo (AT-52), a tug in commission from 1908 to 1937 and in non-commissioned service from 1942 to 1946
- USS Navajo (AT-64), a tug commissioned in 1940 and sunk in 1943
- USS Navajo (ATA-211), an auxiliary ocean tug in commission from 1945 to 1962
- USNS Navajo (T-ATF-169), a fleet ocean tug in service with Military Sealift Command from 1980 to 2016
- USNS Navajo (T-ATS-6), the lead ship of the Navajo class of rescue and salvage ships

== See also ==
- USS Navajo III (SP-298), a patrol vessel in commission from 1917 to 1919
