= Taurus Model 82 =

Taurus 82
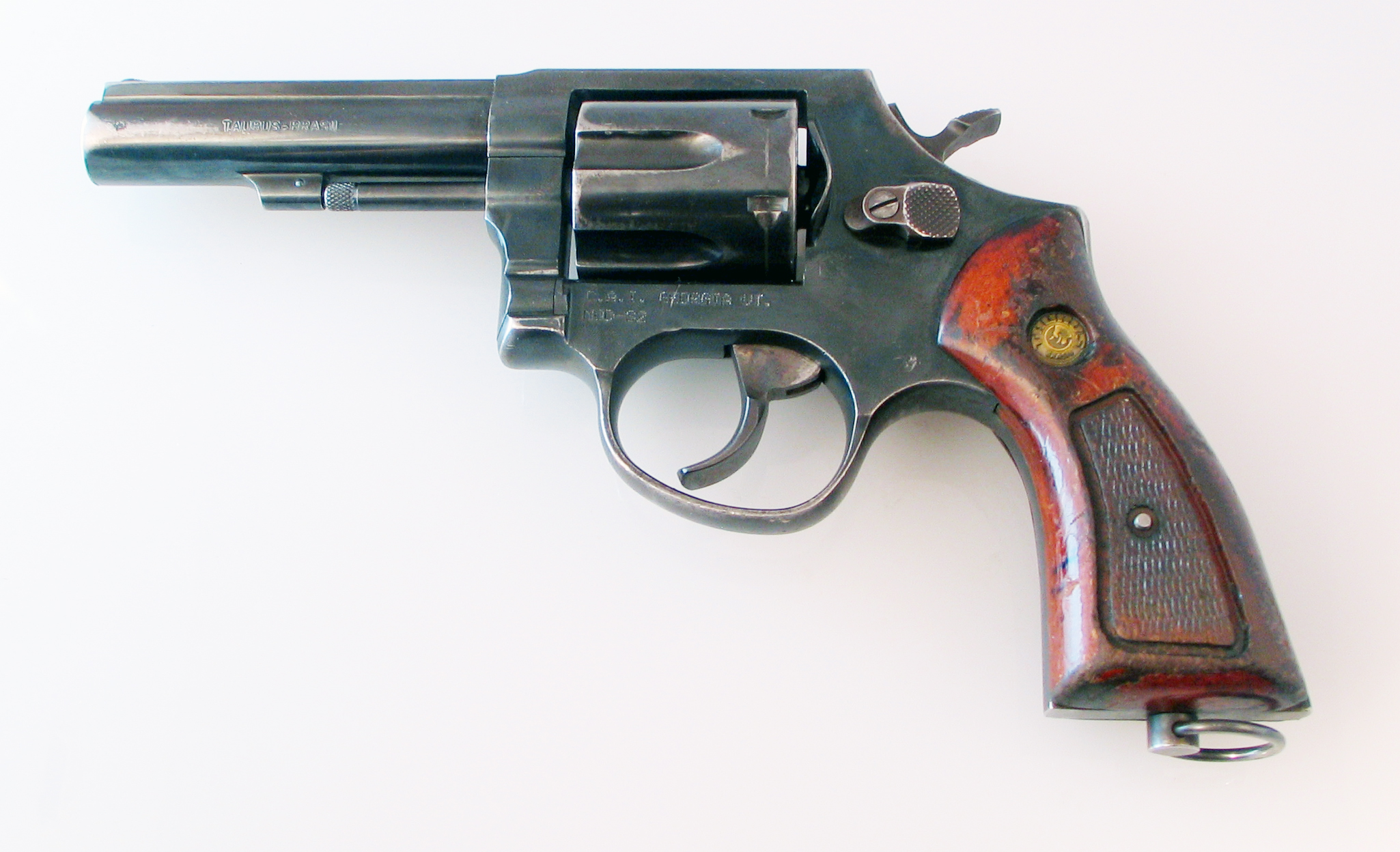
- Taurus Model 82
- Type: Revolver
- Place of origin: Brazil

Service history
- In service: 1982–present

Production history
- Manufacturer: Taurus International
- Unit cost: MSRP: $499.00

Specifications
- Mass: 37.0 oz
- Length: 9.25"
- Barrel length: 4.0"
- Width: 1.50"
- Height: 5.50"
- Cartridge: .38 Special
- Action: Double-Action / Single-Action
- Muzzle velocity: ~900 fps (125 grain 38 special +p)
- Feed system: 6-round Cylinder
- Sights: Fixed

The Taurus Model 82 is a 6-shot, .38 Special, medium frame revolver manufactured by Taurus.

== Design ==
The revolver is similar in configuration to the Smith & Wesson Model 10 which, at one time, was the mainstay of law enforcement agencies in the United States.

Some variations of the Model 82 feature a lanyard loop to secure the revolver.

== Usage ==
The Model 82 is the standard issue sidearm of Indonesian National Police and issued with locally manufactured .38 caliber ammunition by Pindad.

In Brazil, it was the standard issue police firearm for many years, but has been replaced by .40 S&W pistols (also made by Taurus) in later years. However, it is still in use by private security firms and municipal guards. Carabineros de Chile, the Chilean uniformed police, also uses the Taurus 82 as a standard issue firearm.

== Users ==
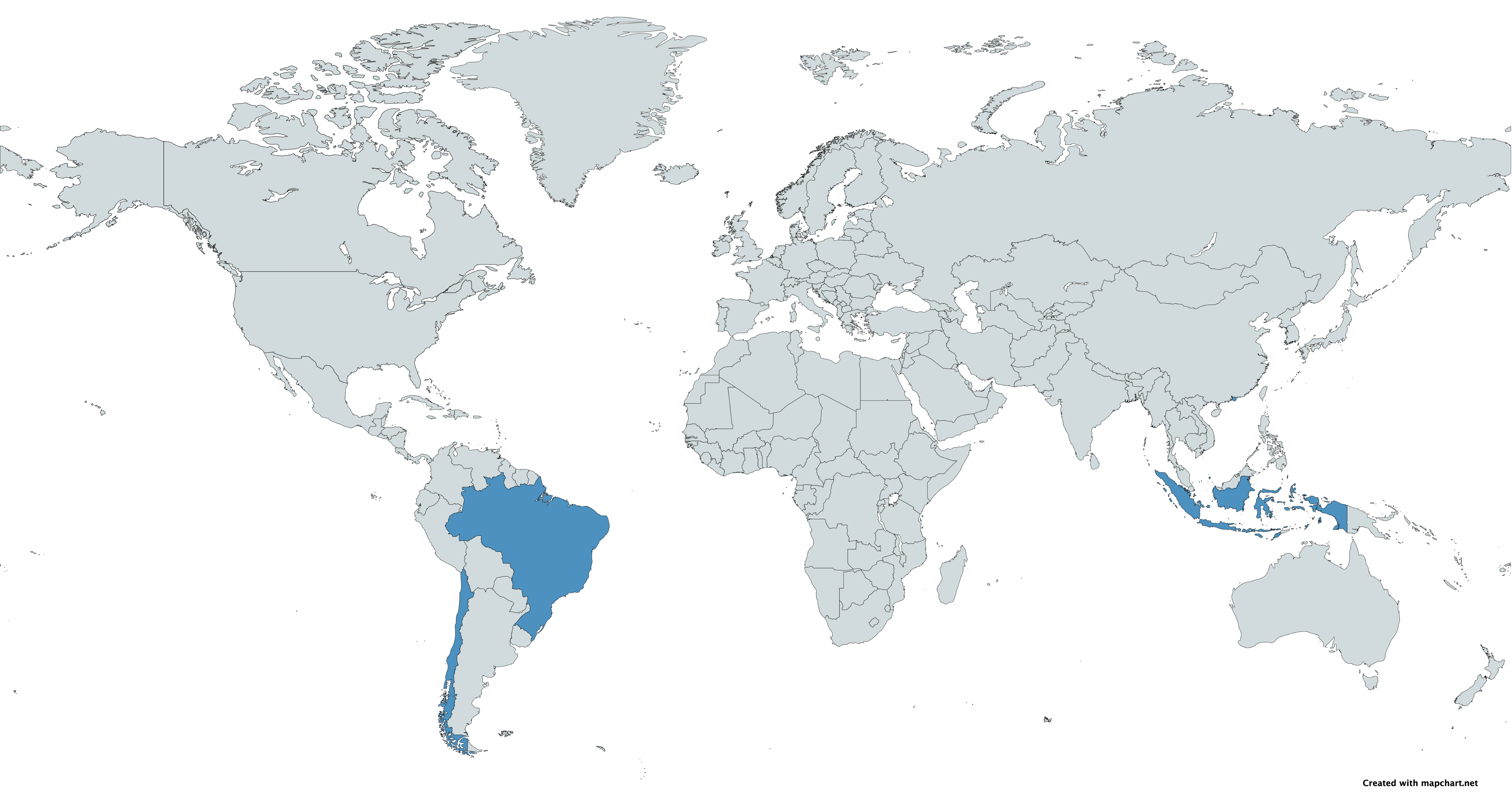
A map with Taurus Model 82 users in blue

- Brazil
- Chile
- Indonesia
- USA
