= Rebecca Schaeffer =

American model and actress (1967–1989)

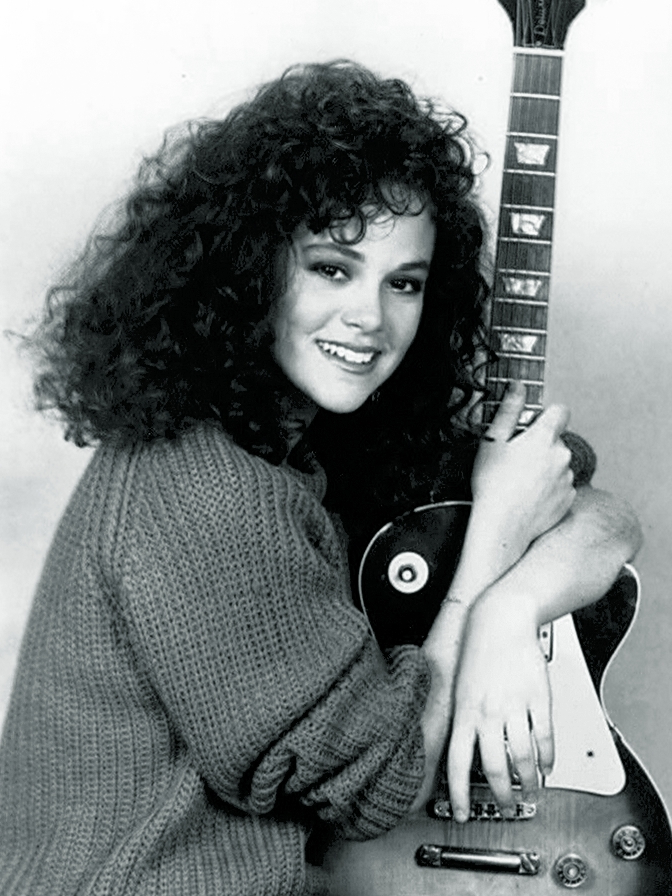
- Press photo of Schaeffer c. 1987
- Born: Rebecca Lucile Schaeffer; November 6, 1967; Eugene, Oregon, U.S.
- Died: July 18, 1989 (aged 21); Los Angeles, California, U.S.
- Cause of death: Gunshot wound (homicide)
- Resting place: Ahavai Sholom Cemetery, Portland, Oregon, U.S. 45.4569°N 122.6795°W
- Occupations: Actress; model
- Years active: 1985–1989

Signature
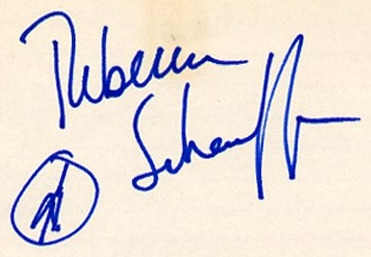

Rebecca Lucile Schaeffer (/ˈʃeɪfər/ SHAY-fər; November 6, 1967 – July 18, 1989) was an American actress and model. She began her career as a teen model before moving on to acting. In 1986, she landed the role of Patricia "Patti" Russell in the CBS comedy My Sister Sam. The series was canceled in 1988, and she appeared in several films, including the black comedy Scenes from the Class Struggle in Beverly Hills. At the age of 21, she was shot and killed by Robert John Bardo, a 19-year-old obsessed fan who had been stalking her. Schaeffer's death helped lead to the passage of legislation in California aimed at preventing stalking.

== Early life ==
Schaeffer was born on November 6, 1967, in Eugene, Oregon, the only child of Danna Olivia Schaeffer (née Wilner) and Benson Schaeffer. Her mother was a writer and instructor who taught at Willamette University and Portland Community College, and her father worked as a child psychologist. Schaeffer was raised in Portland, where she attended Lincoln High School. She was raised Jewish and initially aspired to become a rabbi, but she began modeling during her junior year in high school. She appeared in department store catalogues and television commercials, and as an extra in a television film. In 1984, when she was 16, she worked a summer in New York City with Elite Model Management and with her parents' permission stayed in the city to pursue modeling.

== Career ==
While working in New York, Schaeffer attended Professional Children's School. She also had a short-term role on the daytime soap opera Guiding Light.

In late 1984, Schaeffer landed the role of Annie Barnes on ABC's One Life to Live for a stint that lasted six months. During this time, she attempted to further her modeling prospects. At 5 ft 7 in (1.70 m), she was considered too short for high-fashion modeling and struggled to find work. In 1985, she moved to Japan in hopes of finding more modeling jobs, but still encountered difficulty due to her height and weight. She returned to New York City and decided to focus on an acting career.

In 1986, Schaeffer won a small role in Woody Allen's comedy Radio Days, but her character was edited out except for one brief scene. She continued modeling and also worked as a waitress. She appeared on the cover of Seventeen magazine, which caught the attention of television producers who were casting for the comedy My Sister Sam starring Pam Dawber. Schaeffer won the role of Patricia "Patti" Russell, a teenager who moves from Oregon to San Francisco to live with her 29-year-old sister Samantha ("Sam") after the death of their parents. Schaeffer moved to Los Angeles to live with Dawber and Dawber's husband, fellow actor Mark Harmon, during her work on the series. My Sister Sam was initially a hit, ranking in the top 25, but it was canceled halfway through its second season in April 1988 due to falling ratings.

After My Sister Sam, Schaeffer had supporting roles in Scenes from the Class Struggle in Beverly Hills, Voyage of Terror: The Achille Lauro Affair, The End of Innocence, and the television film Out of Time. She also served as a spokesperson for the children's charity Thursday's Child.

== Murder ==
Murder of Rebecca Schaeffer
- Location: 34.0752°N 118.3700°W; 120 North Sweetzer Avenue; Los Angeles, California, U.S.
- Date: July 18, 1989; 37 years ago 10:15 am (PDT (UTC-07:00))
- Target: Rebecca Lucile Schaeffer
- Attack type: Murder by shooting
- Weapon: Ruger GP100 .357 handgun
- Deaths: 1 (Schaeffer)
- Perpetrator: Robert John Bardo
- Motive: Obsession due to stalking
- Verdict: Guilty
- Convictions: First-degree murder
- Sentence: Life in prison without the possibility of parole

On July 18, 1989, Robert John Bardo, a 19-year-old male from Tucson, Arizona, an unemployed janitor who previously worked at a Jack in the Box restaurant, shot and killed Schaeffer at her home in West Hollywood. At the time of her death, she had been stalked by Bardo for three years. He had previously been obsessed with child peace activist Samantha Smith, who died in a plane crash in 1985. He then wrote numerous letters to Schaeffer, one of which she answered. In 1987, he traveled to Los Angeles hoping to meet with Schaeffer on the set of My Sister Sam, but Warner Bros. Studios in Burbank forced the security to turn him away. He returned a month later armed with a knife, but security guards again prevented him from gaining access. He returned to Tucson, and lost focus on Schaeffer for a while as his obsession shifted towards pop singers Tiffany, Debbie Gibson, and Madonna.

Bardo watched Schaeffer in the black comedy film Scenes from the Class Struggle in Beverly Hills in 1989, in which she appeared in bed with that film's co-star Ray Sharkey. He became enraged by the scene, apparently out of jealousy, and decided that Schaeffer should be punished for "becoming another Hollywood whore." Arthur Richard Jackson had stalked and stabbed actress Theresa Saldana in 1982, and Bardo learned that Jackson had used a private investigator to obtain Saldana's address. Bardo then paid a detective agency in Tucson $250 to find Schaeffer's home address in Fairfax District (Note: Now part of Beverly Grove neighborhood) from California's Department of Motor Vehicles (DMV) records. With the help of his brother, he acquired a Ruger GP100 .357 revolver.

Bardo traveled overnight from Tucson to Los Angeles for a third time and roamed the Fairfax neighborhood where Schaeffer lived, asking people if she actually lived there. Once he was certain that the address was correct, he rang the doorbell. Schaeffer was preparing for an audition for The Godfather Part III, and was scheduled to meet director Francis Ford Coppola later in the afternoon to cast the role of Mary Corleone, the daughter of the film series protagonist Michael Corleone. Schaeffer lived alone at her apartment; as she was expecting the delivery of Coppola's script, she answered the door. Bardo presented her a manila envelope with letter and autograph that she had previously sent him; after a short conversation, she asked him not to come to her home again. He went to a diner nearby and had breakfast, then returned to her apartment an hour later. Schaeffer answered the door wearing a black bathrobe and with "a cold look on her face," Bardo later said. At 10:15 am Pacific Daylight Time, Bardo pulled out the handgun and shot her in the chest at point-blank range in the doorway of her apartment building. Neighbors quickly rushed to the scene, when they found a dying Schaeffer collapsed on the ground; according to Bardo, she kept repeating, "Why? Why?" Schaeffer was rushed to the emergency room of Cedars-Sinai Medical Center, where she was pronounced dead 30 minutes after her arrival.

Schaeffer's agent Jonathan Howard came to her apartment in the afternoon to check on her ahead of the scheduled The Godfather Part III audition; informed that Schaeffer had died, he relayed the news to Schaeffer's close friend, singer-actress and fellow Oregonian Barbara Lusch, for Lusch to tell the news to her devastated parents, Benson and Danna, in her hometown of Portland, Oregon. Schaeffer's casket was flown from Los Angeles and arrived at Portland International Airport on July 23, 1989, where it was transported to Ahavai Sholom Cemetery for her burial. Two hundred mourners were present, among whom were Lusch, Schaeffer's boyfriend; upcoming television and film director Brad Silberling; Schaeffer's My Sister Sam co-star, Pam Dawber; Dawber's husband, Mark Harmon; and several of Schaeffer's friends and her relatives.

== Aftermath ==
Tucson Police Department officers, including Chief Peter Ronstadt, arrested Bardo as he was returning to Tucson the next day after motorists reported a man running through traffic on Interstate 10. He immediately confessed to the murder. Marcia Clark, later known for her role as lead prosecutor in the O. J. Simpson murder case, prosecuted the case against him. Bardo was convicted on October 29, 1991, of first-degree aggravated murder in a bench trial and was sentenced to life in prison without the possibility of parole. As a result of this incident, federal law regarding the release of personal information through the DMV was changed. The Driver's Privacy Protection Act, which prevents the DMV from releasing private addresses, was enacted to the United States Congress in 1994. Her death also helped prompt the 1990 passing of America's first anti-stalking laws, including California Penal Code 646.9.

At the time of her death, Schaeffer was dating director Brad Silberling. Her death influenced his film Moonlight Mile (2002) about a man's grief after his fiancée is murdered. To honor Schaeffer, Dawber and other My Sister Sam co-stars Joel Brooks, David Naughton, and Jenny O'Hara reunited and filmed a public service announcement for the Center to Prevent Handgun Violence in support of the Brady Handgun Violence Prevention Act, which was enacted in 1993. Schaeffer's parents, Benson and Danna Schaeffer, also became gun control advocates following her death. Danna launched the lobbying group of Oregonians Against Gun Violence in 1990. Danna died at the age of 78 on November 6, 2022, on what would have been Rebecca Schaeffer's 55th birthday, following complications from aortic valve replacement.

== Filmography ==
Year	Title	Role	Notes	Ref.
1985	Guiding Light	Mandy Sue Lewiston		
1985	One Life to Live	Annie Barnes	Unknown episodes	
1986	Amazing Stories	Miss Crowningshield	Episode: "Miscalculation"	
1986–1988	My Sister Sam	Patti Russell	44 episodes	
1987	Radio Days	Communist's Daughter		
1988	Out of Time	Pam Wallace	Television movie	
1989	Scenes from the Class Struggle in Beverly Hills	Zandra Lipkin		
1990	Voyage of Terror: The Achille Lauro Affair	Cheryl	Television movie; released posthumously	
1990	The End of Innocence	Stephanie (18–25 years old)	Released posthumously; dedicated in memory	

== See also ==
- Murder of John Lennon – 1980 murder in New York City, US
- Murder of Selena – 1995 murder in Corpus Christi, Texas, US
- Ricardo López (attempted to murder Björk; 1996)
- Murder of Dimebag Darrell – 2004 mass shooting in Columbus, Ohio, United States
- Murder of Christina Grimmie – 2016 murder in Orlando, Florida
