= Chalk Mountain (Churchill County, Nevada) =

Mountain in the state of Nevada

Coordinates: 39°19′33″N 118°07′14″W

Chalk Mountain is a summit in the U.S. state of Nevada. The elevation is 5,321 feet (1,622 m).

Chalk Mountain was so named on account of its mineral composition.
