= Avenal, California =

City in California, United States

- City
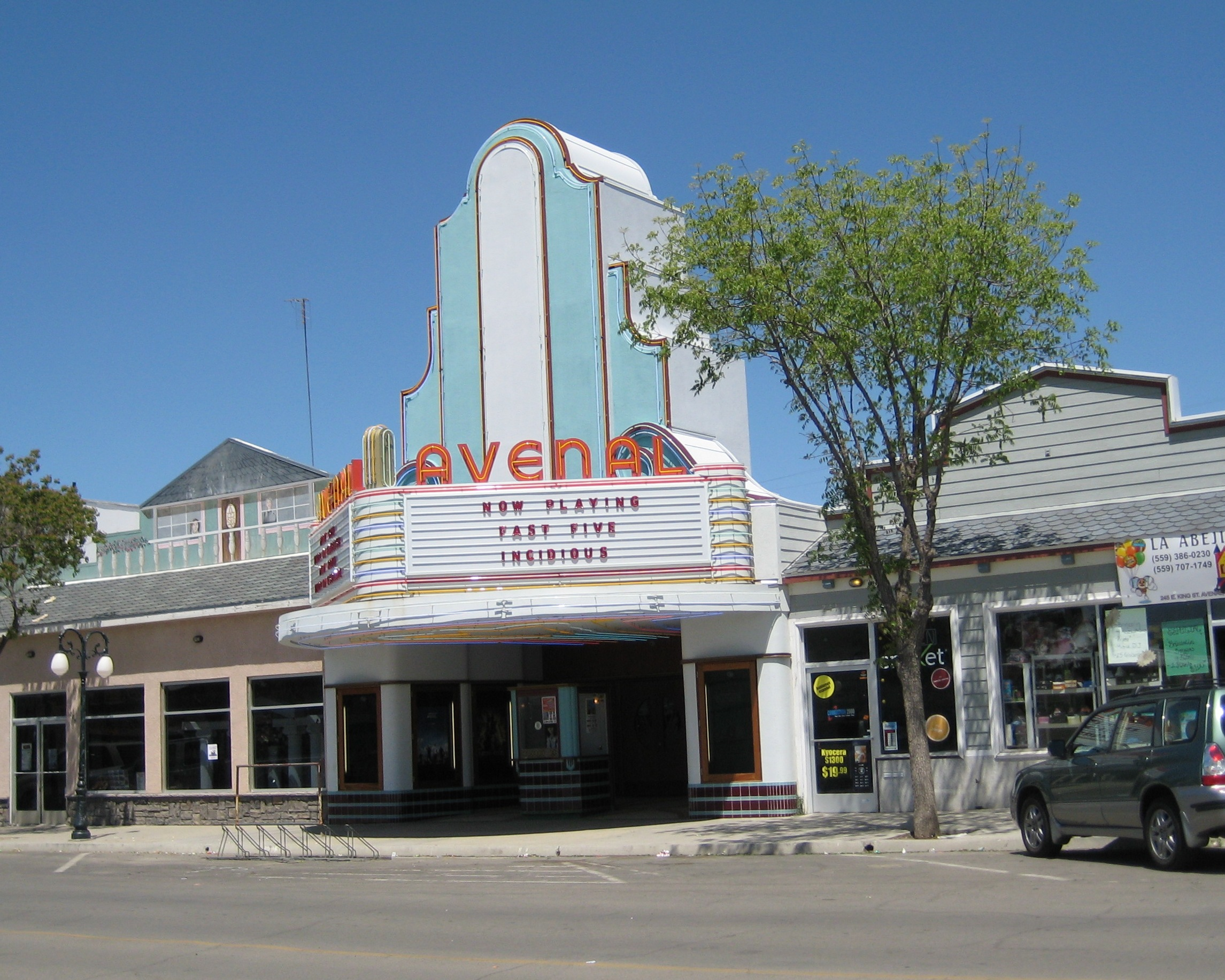
- The Avenal Theater in 2011

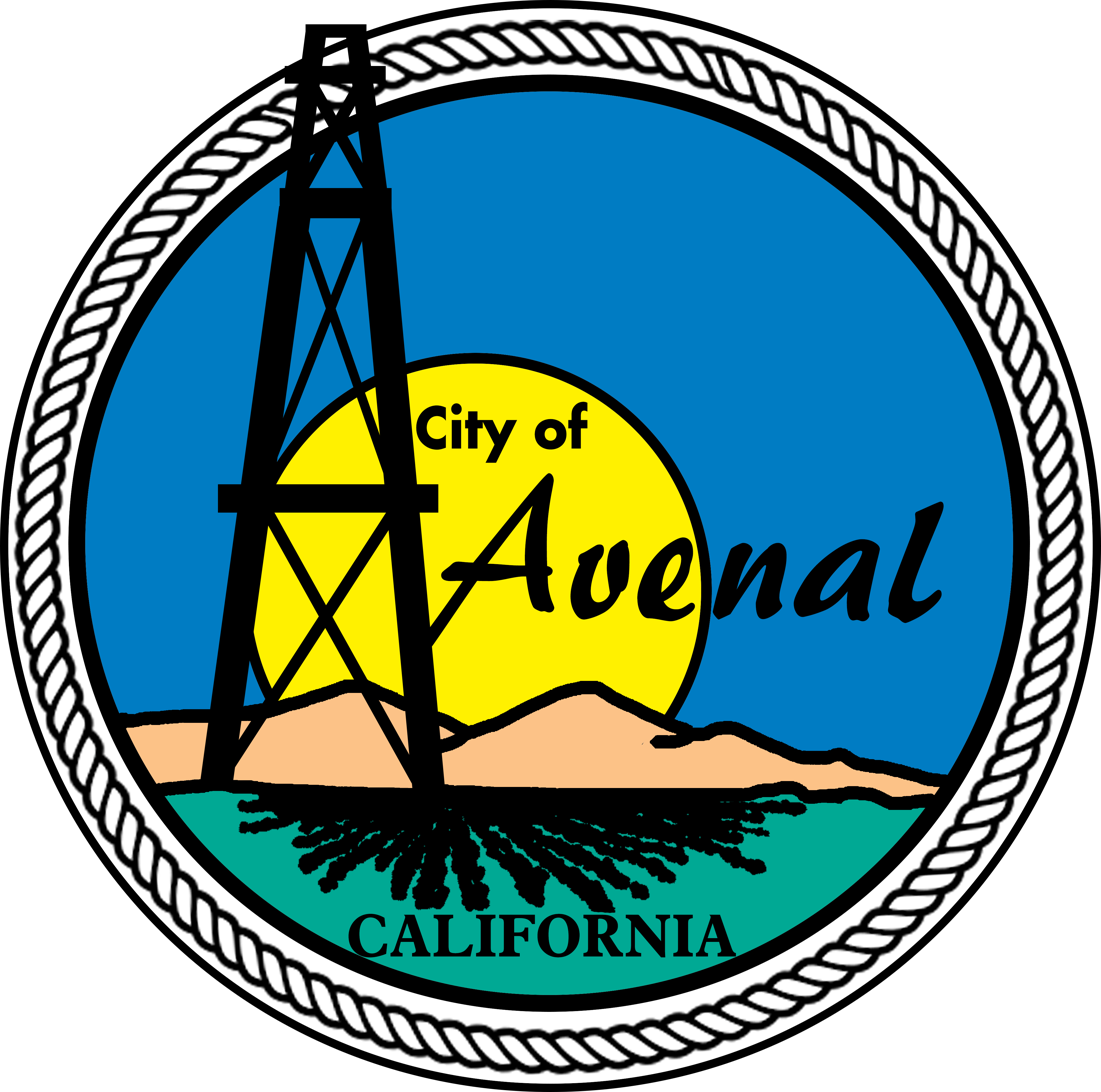
- Seal
- Interactive map of Avenal, California
- Location in California Location in the United States
- Coordinates: 36°00′15″N 120°07′44″W
- Country: United States
- State: California
- County: Kings
- Incorporated: September 11, 1979

Government
  - City Council: Ricardo Verdugo; (Note: Verdugo is the only member of the council who can legally conduct city business. All other members of the council were recalled in June 2026, but have refused to leave office or recognize the result of the recall.)
  - City Manager: Antony V. López

Area
  - Total: 19.48 sq mi (50.46 km^{2})
  - Land: 19.48 sq mi (50.46 km^{2})
  - Water: 0 sq mi (0.00 km^{2}) 0%
- Elevation: 807 ft (246 m)

Population (2020)
  - Total: 13,696
  - Density: 703.0/sq mi (271.42/km^{2})
- Time zone: UTC-8 (Pacific (PST))
  - Summer (DST): UTC-7 (PDT)
- ZIP code: 93204
- Area code: 559
- FIPS code: 06-03302
- GNIS feature IDs: 1660285, 2409764
- Website: cityofavenal.gov

Avenal (Spanish for "Oat field") is a city in Kings County, California, United States. Avenal is located 35 miles (56 km) southwest of Hanford, at an elevation of 807 ft (246 m). It is part of the Hanford-Corcoran metropolitan area (MSA Code 25260), which encompasses all of Kings County. In area, it is the fourth-largest city in Kings County. As of the 2020 census, Avenal had a population of 13,696, which includes inmates at the Avenal State Prison, the first prison actively solicited by a community in the state of California. Many of the remaining residents largely either work at the prison or in the agriculture industry. The prison provides approximately 1,000 jobs to residents. The California Department of Finance estimated that Avenal's population was 13,496 on July 1, 2019. As of that date, Avenal State Prison held 4,165 inmates, which was about 32% of the total population of Avenal. Inmates are counted as city residents by both the United States census and the California Department of Finance.

== History ==
=== Early history ===
The City of Avenal was named by Spanish soldiers and explorers. In Spanish, avena means 'oats', and avenal means 'oatfield'. This area was covered with wild oats, "waist high," that looked like golden silk and covered the Kettleman Plains.

Early American settlers arrived in the Kettleman Hills during the 1850s with dreams of raising cattle and farming. Oil, however, would bring fame, fortune and people to the area. Native Americans had always known oil was in the hills, with natural seepage around Coalinga and Tar Canyon. The first Kettleman Hills well was drilled in 1900, followed by countless unproductive efforts.

On March 27, 1927, the Milham Exploration Company began work on Elliot No. 1. The crew toiled for 19 months, drilling past the 7,000-foot (2,100 m) mark. On October 5, 1928, the well blew out with a roar which was heard 20 miles (32 km) away, spewing forth an oil so fine that its color was white, and reportedly could be used unrefined as gasoline in automobiles.

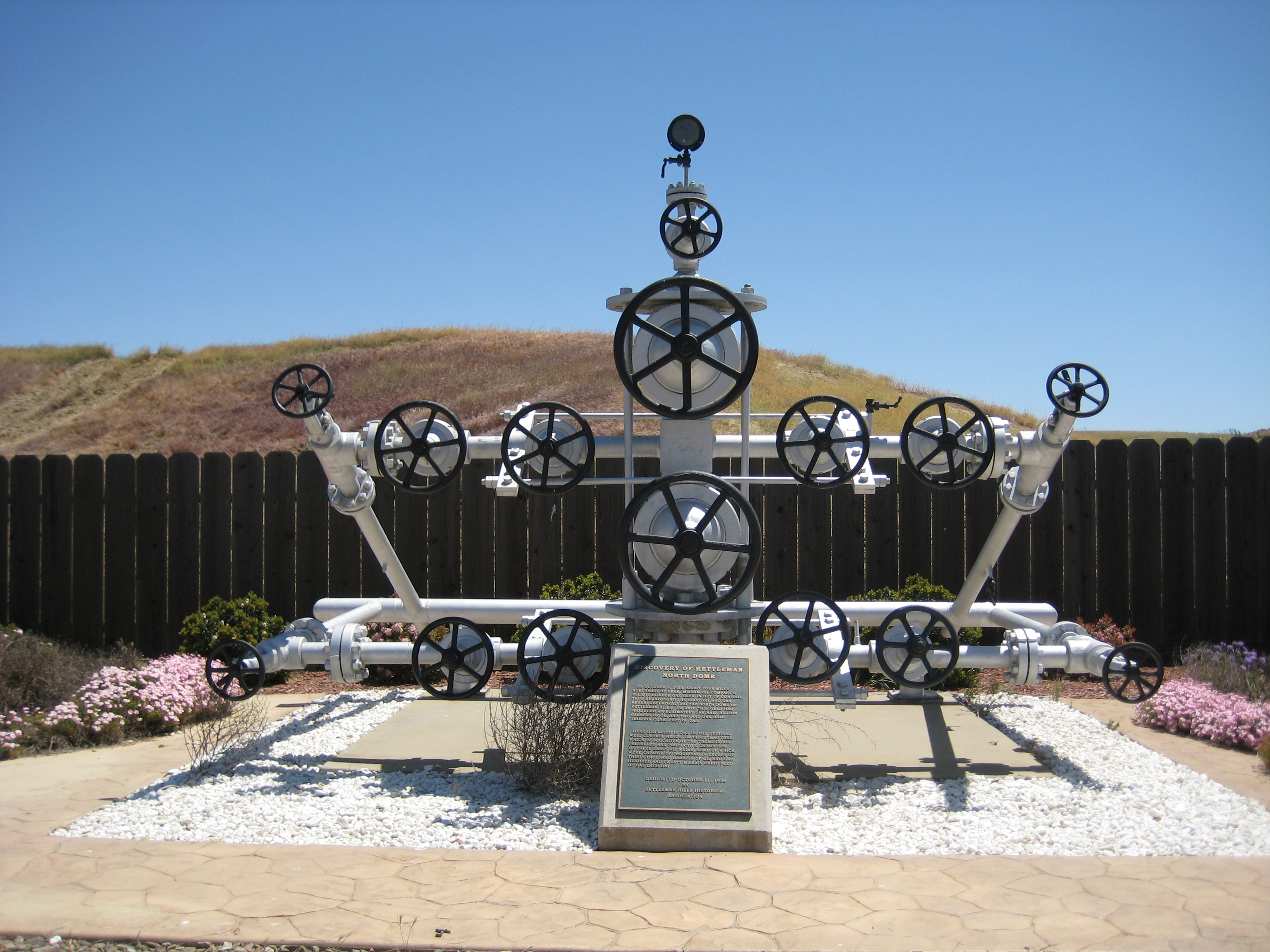
Monument to the Discovery of the Kettleman North Dome Oil Field in 1928

The discovery of oil transformed Avenal into a boomtown. In 1929, Standard Oil surveyed the current site of Avenal to build a town. Makeshift houses were hauled in from Taft to take the place of the tents. A water line was laid and later a sewer plant was installed, a post office replaced a cigar box in the general store, a fire department was organized, and a community grew. Standard Oil Company built the residents a 600-seat theater and a hospital.

Also in the first year (1929), nearly 20 businesses occupied Kings Street and Skyline Boulevard. By 1936, Avenal boasted a population of 3,000—mostly oil workers—with 100 businesses and 69 private telephones and numerous community organizations. In 1940, Avenal was the second-largest town in Kings County with a population of over 4,000 and was known to have some of the best services and schools in the state.

Although today Avenal and its economy are largely reliant on the Avenal State Prison and agriculture, Avenal was once a booming oil town known as the "Oil Fields Capital."

Development of the oil fields led to rapid population growth in the area, creating a need for residential facilities and infrastructure in nearby settlement sites.

Milham City was projected by a group of Kings County citizens who owned lands on the slope of the hills east of the oil field. It scarcely had emerged from the dream stage when the Standard Oil Company announced in 1929 that a townsite had been set aside on the northwestern slope of the hills and that it would be called Avenal.

The present town of Avenal was established near the oil field. Roads and streets were surveyed and laid out, water mains were laid, and the town developed quickly.

An emergency hospital was built. Small and large homes were purposefully constructed to enjoy a fuller life in the erstwhile barren plains and trees were planted to provide much needed shade.

On December 5, 1929, the first mail arrived at the new Avenal post office located at Moore's Soda Fountain.

During World War II was the site of a training landing strip called Murray Field, part of Lemoore Army Air Field.

=== Growth ===
Among the first business establishments at Avenal were Koepp's Welding Works, The Republic Supply Company, Mac's Coffee Shop, Moore's Soda Fountain and the Cross Lumber Company. Presently, the town included 26 oil field supply houses, 12 oil field service company branches, 9 grocery stores, 9 service stations, 8 restaurants, 5 welding establishments, 4 builders' supply houses and numerous other enterprises.

While the oil fields and their urban center were populated with industrious, law-abiding people the problem of keeping the peace and maintaining the dignity of the law existed there just as it does in all other communities where there is life, action and big payrolls. To meet this commonplace problem a township was established and on April 1, 1937, E.W. Oliver was appointed as justice of the peace and William "Bill" Brendal was named constable. Aiding and cooperating with them in the enforcement of the law was Deputy Sheriff Richard "Dick" Doty, who was appointed by Sheriff L.P. Loftis in 1935.

Two other county offices maintained deputies at Avenal for service in the oil fields. They were Orville Robbins, deputy county assessor; and R. W. Zivnuska, deputy county treasurer.

By election in February 1934, the Avenal Township formed a fire district, which served efficiently both in the town and country districts. The three fire district commissioners originally elected were Ray Mohler, Floyd Rice and Jess Hamilton.

The Avenal district owned one well-equipped White fire truck and a half interest with the West Side Fire Protection District, of a two-ton Reo fire truck. Two full-time drivers were regularly employed and 20 firemen worked call. The firehouse provided living quarters for the employees. Fire Chief L. H. Dell was assisted by M. L. Sperling.

By April 1930, Dr. S. V. Dragoo was the head of the emergency hospital. Dr. Dragoo was assisted by one office worker and two nurses, having two special nurses on call. Between five and six hundred calls per month with about thirty accident cases were handled by this organization, not to mention the ambulance service extended.

Appointed postmistress in November 1931, Mrs. Marie Eads served in that office until July 1933, when she resigned and Charles E. Day was appointed. The post office later occupied a two-story building leased by the Standard Oil Company in 1935. Later in Avenal's history, the Post Office leased a space adjacent to Finster's Market (later T&T Market). In the late 1990s, the post office was relocated to its current location near the intersection of Skyline Blvd and San Joaquin Street.

The collapse of oil and gas production came with the intrusion of salt water into the oil reservoir, leaving 65 to 70 percent of the North Dome of the Kettleman Hills still undisturbed.

In 1953, oil companies with holdings in the area fields named the Standard Oil Company of California to operate the fields. Avenal's economy dwindled and with it, many stores, buildings and houses were vacated until the 1960s when an influx of agricultural workers made a major impact on Avenal and surrounding area.

The early 1970s saw two substantial projects that had significant impacts on the city: the completion of the California Aqueduct which brought in needed water to the westside of the San Jaoquin valley, and the opening of Interstate 5.

The citizens of Avenal voted for incorporation in September 1979, and while going through the early stages of being a new city, the citizens pursued and were successful in bringing a state prison to Avenal. Avenal State Prison opened in 1987. By 2009, it housed 6,577 inmates and employed 1,517 people, making it a vital part of the community. The building of the facility dramatically increased the city's total valuation with construction, improvements and activity that could be seen in every area of the city.

Avenal is also home to the Central California Soaring Club headquartered at the Avenal Gliderport. This year-round operation is one of the few glider-only airports in the western United States, and one of only a few in the entire US that owns/operates its own airport. A soaring contest is held there every spring.

Construction has been completed on the renovation of Skyline Boulevard (California State Route 269) in the city's joint effort with Caltrans. Avenal has also completed a massive public improvement project with the development of 52 miles (84 km) of new curbs, gutters and sidewalks throughout the city.

In November 2010, the Avenal Police Department was initiated with 14 sworn officers. Jack Amoroso was the first police chief.

Although Avenal's future is no longer closely tied to oil, it will always mark its beginnings from "the day Milham came in," and the cigar box on the counter of the general store which was its first post office.

In 2019, USA Today named Avenal the 10th-worst city in America due to high unemployment and violent crime.

== Geography ==
Avenal is located at 36°00′15″N 120°07′14″W, 180 miles (290 km) north of Los Angeles and 200 miles (320 km) south of both San Francisco and Sacramento. The city is located on the Kettleman Plain, between the Kettleman Hills and the Chalk Buttes. The city boasts at being located, "Half the way from the Bay to L.A." According to the United States Census Bureau, Avenal has a total area of 19.4 square miles (50 km^{2}), all land. Most of the population resides in the southwestern portion of the city. The northeastern areas, separated by the Kettleman Hills, and where Interstate 5 passes through, remain mostly rural.

=== Climate ===
According to the Köppen Climate Classification system, Avenal has a semi-arid climate, abbreviated "BSk" on climate maps.

== Demographics ==
Historical population
Census	Pop.	Note	%±
1950	3,982		—
1960	3,147		−21.0%
1970	3,035		−3.6%
1980	4,137		36.3%
1990	9,770		136.2%
2000	14,674		50.2%
2010	15,505		5.7%
2020	13,696		−11.7%
U.S. Decennial Census; 1860–1870 1880-1890; 1900 1910 1920; 1930 1940 1950; 1960 1970 1980; 1990 2000 2010

Avenal is a small city of approximately 13,696 people, including prison inmates. Avenal owes its origin to the discovery of oil on October 4, 1928, in the adjacent Kettleman Hills. Avenal was the site of a "tent city" as the boom started, but foresight made the boom orderly, so that by 1940 Avenal was the second largest town in Kings County with a population of 4,600.

Growth continues today to include a more diversified economy based on oil, agriculture, and the service industry. In 1978, Avenal citizens voted to incorporate. The presence of the Avenal State Prison helps this rural community maintain economic stability, especially as the once-productive Kettleman North Dome Oil Field reaches exhaustion (less than one-half of one percent of its original oil remains).

=== 2020 census ===
As of the 2020 census, Avenal had a population of 13,696 and a population density of 703.0 inhabitants per square mile (271.4/km^{2}). The age distribution was 23.7% under age 18, 8.8% age 18 to 24, 36.0% age 25 to 44, 26.2% age 45 to 64, and 5.2% age 65 or older. The median age was 35.0 years. For every 100 females, there were 200.0 males, and for every 100 females age 18 and over, there were 243.6 males age 18 and over.

The census reported that 9,408 people (68.7% of the population) lived in households and 4,288 (31.3%) were institutionalized. 97.1% of residents lived in urban areas, while 2.9% lived in rural areas.

There were 2,479 households, of which 58.7% had children under the age of 18. Of all households, 51.1% were married-couple households, 10.2% were cohabiting-couple households, 24.5% had a female householder with no spouse or partner present, and 14.2% had a male householder with no spouse or partner present. 10.9% of households were one person, and 3.9% were one person aged 65 or older. The average household size was 3.8. There were 2,094 families (84.5% of all households).

There were 2,586 housing units at an average density of 132.7 units per square mile (51.2 units/km^{2}), of which 2,479 (95.9%) were occupied. Of occupied units, 43.9% were owner-occupied and 56.1% were renter-occupied. The vacancy rate for housing units was 4.1%; the homeowner vacancy rate was 0.6% and the rental vacancy rate was 3.4%.

Racial composition as of the 2020 census
Race	Number	Percent
White	3,216	23.5%
Black or African American	125	0.9%
American Indian and Alaska Native	254	1.9%
Asian	92	0.7%
Native Hawaiian and Other Pacific Islander	15	0.1%
Some other race	8,316	60.7%
Two or more races	1,678	12.3%
Hispanic or Latino (of any race)	11,545	84.3%

2023 ACS 5-year estimates

In 2023, the US Census Bureau estimated that 36.3% of the population were foreign-born. Of all people aged 5 or older, 22.8% spoke only English at home, 75.7% spoke Spanish, 0.2% spoke other Indo-European languages, 0.8% spoke Asian or Pacific Islander languages, and 0.5% spoke other languages. Of those aged 25 or older, 51.2% were high school graduates and 4.4% had a bachelor's degree.

The median household income in 2023 was $52,986, and the per capita income was $13,664. About 16.7% of families and 22.1% of the population were below the poverty line.

=== 2010 census ===
The 2010 United States census reported that Avenal had a population of 15,505. The population density was 798.3 inhabitants per square mile (308.2/km^{2}). The racial makeup of Avenal was 6,044 (39.0%) White, 1,625 (10.5%) African American, 186 (1.2%) Native American, 108 (0.7%) Asian, 6 (0.0%) Pacific Islander, 7,188 (46.4%) from other races, and 348 (2.2%) from two or more races. Hispanic or Latino of any race were 11,130 persons (71.8%).

The census reported that 9,082 people (58.6% of the population) lived in households, 0 (0%) lived in non-institutionalized group quarters, and 6,423 (41.4%) were institutionalized.

There were 2,222 households, out of which 1,437 (64.7%) had children under the age of 18 living in them, 1,236 (55.6%) were opposite-sex married couples living together, 404 (18.2%) had a female householder with no husband present, 236 (10.6%) had a male householder with no wife present. There were 236 (10.6%) unmarried opposite-sex partnerships, and 11 (0.5%) same-sex married couples or partnerships. 229 households (10.3%) were made up of individuals, and 73 (3.3%) had someone living alone who was 65 years of age or older. The average household size was 4.09. There were 1,876 families (84.4% of all households); the average family size was 4.26.

The population was spread out, with 3,315 people (21.4%) under the age of 18, 1,661 people (10.7%) aged 18 to 24, 6,039 people (38.9%) aged 25 to 44, 3,872 people (25.0%) aged 45 to 64, and 618 people (4.0%) who were 65 years of age or older. The median age was 34.2 years. For every 100 females, there were 262.5 males. For every 100 females age 18 and over, there were 357.9 males.

There were 2,410 housing units at an average density of 124.1 units per square mile (47.9 units/km^{2}), of which 1,011 (45.5%) were owner-occupied, and 1,211 (54.5%) were occupied by renters. The homeowner vacancy rate was 2.9%; the rental vacancy rate was 5.1%. Four thousand and seventy-seven people (26.3% of the population) lived in owner-occupied housing units and 5,005 people (32.3%) lived in rental housing units.

== Economy ==
Avenal State Prison employs over 1,500 people. Other major employers include The Wonderful Company and the Reef-Sunset Unified School District.

The city has been actively pursuing industrial development and is looking at future development of the Interstate 5 interchange area for both commercial and industrial uses.

In 2008, a 600-megawatt electric power generating plant was proposed to be built and operated in Avenal by Macquarie Cook Power, a subsidiary of the Macquarie Group, doing business as Avenal Power Center, LLC. The project application indicated that the power plant would be fueled with natural gas and that it would be air-cooled. The capital cost of the project would be $530 million. According to the project's proponents, the plant would have generated enough electricity to supply 450,000 homes and businesses annually. The California Energy Commission gave its final approval to the project on December 16, 2009. However, opponents of the power plant vowed to continue to fight. Bradley Angel, executive director of Greenaction for Health and Environmental Justice, threatened to file a lawsuit if the United States Environmental Protection Agency (USEPA) approved the project. Federal approval was delayed, causing the company to sue the USEPA. In February 2011, an EPA official told the U.S. District Court for the District of Columbia that the agency would allow the project to proceed. According to a newspaper story, Bradley Angel commented that Greenaction would continue to fight the project. On May 26, 2011, U.S. District Court Judge Richard Leon ordered the USEPA to make a final permit decision, which the agency did the following day. Construction of the power plant could begin after a 60-day administrative appeal period. Paul Cort of Earthjustice was quoted in a news story as saying that an administrative appeal would be filed, and if that is unsuccessful, the organization would appeal to the Federal court. In June 2011, both People for Clean Air and Water and the Sierra Club filed petitions for review with the USEPA's environmental appeals board. The Center for Biological Diversity joined the Sierra Club's petition. Their petition alleged that the proposed plant would emit excessive nitrogen oxides and is being wrongfully grandfathered in under old clean air rules. On August 18, 2011, the USEPA's environmental appeals board denied the petition. Bradley Angel renewed his vow to continue the fight in court. A news story quoted him as saying: "Basically the fix was in when EPA boss Lisa Jackson broke her commitment to environmental justice and illegally approved the permit. We're going to continue to challenge it. It's going to court." On November 3, 2011, The Sierra Club, the Center for Biological Diversity and Greenaction filed suit with the Ninth Circuit Court of Appeals challenging the EPA permit. On August 12, 2014, the Ninth Circuit Court of Appeals upheld that appeal and rejected the permit, finding that the USEPA had improperly grandfathered the project under the old emissions standards. In June 2015, an attorney representing Avenal Power Center LLC sent a letter to the California Energy Commission stating the company "will let the license expire on Sept. 16, 2015" ending the 7-year long effort to build the power plant.

Many local residents are employed in agriculture, which experienced significant growth on the westside of the San Joaquin Valley after the completion of the California Aqueduct in the early 1970s. However, the community was impacted by the Great Recession as well as the California drought and restrictions on pumping from the Sacramento River delta to protect endangered species. In November 2016, the unemployment rate was 12.7%.

In 2013, the City Council self-proclaimed Avenal to be the 'Pistachio Capital of the World', reflecting the importance of the pistachio industry to the city's economy.

== Culture ==
Avenal has an annual celebration held on the first weekend in May called Avenal Old Timers Day. They also celebrate an annual Pistachio Festival.

== Government ==
In the California State Legislature, Avenal is in the 16th senatorial district, represented by Democrat Melissa Hurtado and in the 33rd Assembly district, represented by Republican Alexandra Macedo.

In the United States House of Representatives, Avenal is in California's 22nd congressional district, represented by Republican David Valadao.

Avenal is represented on the Kings County Board of Supervisors by Richard Valle of Corcoran.

In June 2026, the Mayor of Avenal, Alvaro Preciado, and three Avenal city council members were removed from office in a recall election. Despite the result, the officials refused to leave office, claiming the process was unlawful. In August 2026, the mayor and council members agreed to leave office after a superior court judge upheld the recall election results.

== Education ==
All of the schools in the city of Avenal are within the Reef-Sunset Unified School District (RSUSD). Juan Ruiz was appointed Superintendent of the school district in 2023.

The schools in this district are:

- Avenal Elementary School (K-6)
- Tamarack Elementary School (K-5)
- Reef-Sunset Middle School (6–8)
- Avenal High School (9–12)
- Sunrise Continuation School (9–12)
- Adelante Continuation School (9–12)
- Kettleman City Elementary School (K-12)
- Avenal Adult School

West Hills College Coalinga is located in Coalinga, about 18 miles (29 km) northwest of Avenal.

== Transportation ==
Avenal is located at the junction of California State Route 269 and California State Route 33. The intersection of Route 269 and Interstate 5 is located just to the north of Avenal in Fresno County.

Kings Area Regional Transit provides bus service between Avenal and Hanford.

FlixBus services the city, as a stop point in between Los Angeles and the bay area, at the junction of SR 269 and I-5.

== Notable people ==
- Jose Ramírez, 2012 Boxing Olympian, signed pro with Top Rank.
- Paul Williams, former wide receiver for the Houston Texans
