= Chalk Buttes =

Mountain range in Kings County, California, US

- Location within California

Highest point
- Elevation: 481 m (1,578 ft)

Geography
- Country: United States
- State: California
- District: Kings County
- Range coordinates: 35°53′32.856″N 120°10′49.510″W
- Topo map: USGS Garza Peak

The Chalk Buttes are a mountain range in Kings County, California. They are located south of Avenal, California.
