= Chalk Mountains (Colorado) =

Mountain range in Colorado, US

- Location within Colorado

Highest point
- Elevation: 11,972 ft (3,649 m)

Geography
- Country: United States
- State: Colorado
- County: Archuleta County
- Range coordinates: 37°8′30″N 106°44′59″W
- Topo map: USGS Elephant Head Rock

The Chalk Mountains are a mountain range in Archuleta County, Colorado.
