= Camera Can't Lie EP =

EP by Camera Can't Lie
- Released: July 16, 2007
- Recorded: 2007 at Sonic Ranch Studio, Tornillo
- Genre: Rock, Alternative
- Length: 19:58
- Label: Independent
- Producer: Stephen Short

Camera Can't Lie chronology
Love The Noise (2005)	Camera Can't Lie EP (2007)	Days & Days EP (2009)

Professional ratings
Review scores
Source	Rating
iLike	4.5/5 stars

Camera Can't Lie EP is the second album release from the indie rock band Camera Can't Lie. It was produced by Grammy Award-winning record producer Stephen Short in 2007. A track from the EP, titled "Losing You", was featured on the soundtrack for the 2008 independent mystery film, The Other Side of the Tracks.

== Track listing ==
1. "Risk" - 3:45
2. "Science" - 4:18
3. "Losing You" - 3:37
4. "Don't Back Down" - 3:30
5. "Before We Meet" - 4:48
