= Windsor Drive =

American indie rock band

- Origin: Wausau, Wisconsin, U.S.
- Genres: Indie rock
- Years active: 2008–present
- Members: Kipp Wilde; Owen Jones; Daniel Sukow; Jon Wasleske
- Website: windsordrivemusic.com

Windsor Drive is an American indie rock band from Wausau, Wisconsin, formed in 2008. The band consists of Kipp Wilde (vocals, keyboards), Owen Jones (drums), Daniel Sukow (guitar, vocals), and Jon Wasleske (bass).

The band gained early national exposure when their music video for “Fall” premiered on E! News with Ryan Seacrest on January 19, 2010. On September 25, 2012, Windsor Drive released the EP Wanderlust, which was co-produced and co-written by John Fields and Bleu.

In 2014, the band signed with Cars and Calories Records, a Japan-based label, and co-headlined a tour in Japan in November 2014 with Dave Elkins of Mae. During this period, Windsor Drive toured nationally and internationally and shared stages with artists including Imagine Dragons, Brandi Cyrus, From Indian Lakes, Camera Can't Lie, Ryan Cabrera, Mae, He Is We, Kris Allen and many others.

The band was managed by Stephen Short of Ping Pong Music, who helped secure a publishing agreement and booking representation with Fata Booking. Windsor Drive's music has also been featured on several MTV programs, including The Hills.

A song from Windsor Drives EP, "Bridges", is featured and made available on the soundtrack for the 2009 independent mystery film, The Other Side of the Tracks.

== Tours ==
- 2014 headlining tour in Japan
- Through April and May 2012, they toured with He Is We on their "Give It All" tour.
- 2012 -co headlining tour with From Indian Lakes
- Performed a headlining slot on the Kia Kevin Says Stage in the summer of 2011 on the Vans Warped Tour
- Opened for Mae and Terrible Things on their "Goodbye, Goodnight" tour in the fall of 2010
- In December 2009 and again in May 2010, they co-headlined tour dates with Frank + Derol.

== Band members ==
Current members

- Kipp Wilde – vocals, keys
- Owen Jones – drums
- Daniel Sukow – guitar, vocals
- Jon Wasleske – bass

== Discography ==
=== Extended plays ===
Title	Album details
Meet the Tide	Released: July 15, 2008; Label: Independent; Formats: CD
Bridges	Released: January 19, 2010; Label: Independent; Formats: CD
Under the Weather	Released: April 26, 2011; Label: Independent; Formats: CD
Wanderlust	Released September 25, 2012; Label: Independent; Formats: CD

=== Singles ===
- "I Don't Feel It"
- "Sleepwalking"
- "Going Under"
- "Fall"
