= Indian Lakes Estates, California =

Unincorporated community in California, United States

Indian Lakes Estates
- Unincorporated community
- Location in California Indian Lakes Estates (the United States)
- Coordinates: 37°12′40″N 119°40′49″W
- Country: United States
- State: California
- County: Madera
- Elevation: 2,247 ft (685 m)

Indian Lakes Estates is an unincorporated community in Madera County, California, United States. It borders the Chukchansi Gold Resort and Casino to the east, and is south of Coarsegold. As of 2000, it was a wooded enclave of 485 homes to working families and retirees, using the two-lane Road 417 as their main residential road. It lies at an elevation of 2247 feet (685 m).

== History ==
The area around Indian Lakes Estates was once known as Picayune, where the mining town of Narbo was located between 1883 and 1887.

In 1966, developer Jeff Dennis promoted Indian Lakes Estates, along with Valley Lake Ranchos, marketing them as "18 miles of shoreline". Two years later, the San Francisco Examiner reported that construction had not yet begun and that "No lake is visible."

In 1986, Indian Lakes residents moved to acquire the water distribution system for the subdivision from Hillview Water Co., contending that the existing water source might pose a health hazard. The Madera County Board of Supervisors approved the request, which was opposed by Hillview.

== Relations with Chukchansi ==
In 2003, The Fresno Bee reported that local residents struggled in public meetings to influence planning of the nearby Chukchansi Gold Resort and Casino near Coarsegold, which they worried would compete for scarce groundwater. Some Indian Lakes residents said they thought the casino should be required to pay county property taxes, despite the fact that Indian lands are generally exempt.

In 2014, the Indian Lakes Estates Property Owners Association applied for a $135,643 community grant from the Picayune Rancheria of Chukchansi Indians for fire safety and playground improvements, but consideration of the request was delayed following the closure of the casino, which subsequently re-opened in 2015.

In 2018, the association received a $25,000 community grant from the Chukchansi, which it used to build a new playground structure in Park Pavilion at Indian Lakes.
