= So Is Death & Love =

2005 EP by rock band This World Fair

EP by This World Fair
- Released: June 16, 2005
- Recorded: December 2004 – January 2005 at Sonic Ranch Studio, Tornillo
- Genre: Rock, alternative rock
- Length: 17:35
- Label: EMI/Rethink
- Producer: Stephen Short

This World Fair chronology
| Home (2003) | So Is Death & Love (2005) | This World Fair EP (2007) |

Professional ratings
Review scores
| Source | Rating |
|---|---|
| Melodic.net | 4.5/5 stars |

So Is Death & Love is an EP by the alternative-rock band This World Fair. It was released in 2005. Music critics and journalists considered that the record was ready for airplay on mainstream and college radio. The first two tracks from the EP, "Amy" and "Drama", were rerecorded for the band's self-titled full-length album, This World Fair. Lyrics of the fifth track of the EP, titled "Silicone", were written in to a newer song by the band called "This Morning".

== Track listing ==
1. "Amy" - 3:08
2. "Drama" - 3:12
3. "Chance" - 3:40
4. "Waiting For You" - 3:29
5. "Silicone" - 4:04
