= Killer Minnow =

- Company type: private
- Website type: Film production
- Headquarters: New London, Connecticut
- Owner: StoryForge Labs, LLC
- Industry: Motion Pictures, Advertising, Television
- Website: www.killerminnow.com
- Launched: 2008

Killer Minnow is a visual effects, design, and animation company based in New London, Connecticut. Killer Minnow was founded in 2008 by StoryForge Labs co-founders Chris Conway and Rob King, along with director-editor Ben Insler, as a freelance visual effects studio. The company was later merged into the operations of StoryForge Labs LLC in January 2009 and currently operates as a DBA of StoryForge Labs. Killer Minnow specializes in visual effects, animation and conceptual design for the production of film, television shows, commercials, games and new media. Past clients include Aerosmith, Connecticut Sun (WNBA), Pfizer, Reebok, Hasbro and the Food Network.

== Awards ==
- 2008 Ava Platinum Award for CG Train visual effects shot in The Other Side of the Tracks
- 2010 Ad Club of Connecticut Award in Self Promotion category for Killer Minnow “fishy” promo tin
