= Sour Soul =

Sour Soul may refer to:

- Sour Soul (band), a Mexican indie rock group
- Sour Soul (album), a collaborative album from BadBadNotGood and Ghostface Killah
