= From Indian Lakes =

American indie rock band

- Origin: Indian Lakes Estates, California, U.S.
- Genres: Indie rock; post-rock; alternative rock; dream pop; shoegaze; emo
- Years active: 2009–present
- Labels: Triple Crown Records
- Members: Joey Vannucchi; Justin Stanphill; Jon Rowe
- Past members: Enrique Gutierrez; Chris Kellogg
- Website: fromindianlakes.com

From Indian Lakes is an American indie rock band formed in 2009. Vocalist Joey Vannucchi writes, performs, and produces the music. The band's sound generally incorporates elements of pop, acoustic, emo, shoegaze, and rock.

In interviews, Vannucchi has Mew, Radiohead, Feist, The Dodos, and other indie musicians as influences. As a touring act the group consists of Vannucchi (vocals, guitar, keyboards), Justin Stanphill (guitar, vocals), Enrique Gutierrez (keyboards, samples), and Chris Kellogg (bass, vocals). Vannucchi began songwriting in a small mountain town near Yosemite National Park and later enlisted the help of friends to perform his material. From Indian Lakes have released two albums independently: The Man with Wooden Legs in late 2009 and Able Bodies in 2012. Their third album, Absent Sounds, was released on October 7, 2014 on Triple Crown Records Their fourth album, Everything Feels Better Now, was released on October 14, 2016 via Triple Crown Records.

== History ==
Joey Vannucchi grew up on forty acres of land near Yosemite National Park. Vannucchi spent most of his youth reading books, playing drums, learning new instruments, and exploring the land around his rural home. He received jazz drum lessons and played on a borrowed church drumset for hours daily. Vannucchi said: "I could play my drums for hours. There was no one to bother. No one around cared about the sound."

Throughout high school and into adulthood, Vannucchi participated in various bands. At age 20, he started writing and recording songs at a friend's studio in Indian Lakes Estates, California which he released to Myspace as "Songs From Indian Lakes". This reference was later shortened to the current band name.

After enlisting friends to perform his material, From Indian Lakes began playing local shows and independently released a full-length record, The Man With Wooden Legs, in late 2009.

From Indian Lakes recorded and released the Acoustic EP in 2011 and performed solo on a month-long living room tour across the US.

In November 2012, From Indian Lakes released its second album, Able Bodies, which was well received by both fans and press. Able Bodies was also selected to be on Google Play's Top Unsigned List for 2012 releases and remained on the cover of iTunes as a "rising star of alt-rock" for three weeks.

From Indian Lakes signed to Triple Crown Records in 2013 and released their third album, Absent Sounds on October 7, 2014 and it entered the Billboard 200, reached number 8 on the Top Heatseekers chart, and hit number 36 on the Independent Albums chart.

From Indian Lakes posted a link to their official website and a new EP, Wanderer. It features three new songs and two acoustic renditions of previous songs written and recorded by Vannucchi at his home studio in Northern California. It was produced and engineered by long-time friend Matthew Bedrosian who helped with "The Acoustic EP" in 2011.

On July 23, 2016, a documentary, To and from Indian Lakes, filmed by longtime friend, Guy Samuelson, was released. It was filmed over several months of touring and spending time in Vannucchi's and Samuelson's childhood areas in and around Indian Lakes.

On August 18, 2016, NPR featured a new song, "The Monster", off Everything Feels Better Now, scheduled to be released October 14, 2016 on Triple Crown Records.

On October 14, 2016 "Everything Feels Better Now", a fourth full-length album, was released on Triple Crown Records. The album was produced by Kevin Augunas, engineered/mixed by Gavin Paddock, and mastered by Mikchael Fassbender. EFBN was recorded partly in a coffee shop basement near Vannucchi's brief time home in Chico, CA and finished over several weeks at Fairfax Recordings in the old Sound City Studios space. It was met with praise by fans and critics and featured in Pitchfork, Consequence of Sound, Stereogum as well as charting at 105 in the top 200 on Billboard and debuting at number five on the heat seekers chart.

From Indian Lakes digitally released "EFBN Tapes" on December 5, 2016. The release features demos, alternative versions, and initial interpretations of the songs from "Everything Feels Better Now". It was previously released only on cassette with deluxe pre-orders, but Vannucchi decided to put the songs online stating "These were meant to be released as a deluxe digital add on to the record at a time when new promotion was appropriate, but it continues to feel necessary to put into action words of love and positivity." All proceeds are donated were donated to the Southern Poverty Law Center.

From Indian Lakes self-released their fifth full-length album Dimly Lit on October 18, 2019. The album features numerous guest vocalists, including Soren Bryce of Tummyache, Nandi Rose Plunkett of Half Waif, Miriam Devora of Queen of Jeans, Meagan Grandall of Lemolo, and Lynn Gunn of Pvris.

== Discography ==
Studio albums

- The Man with Wooden Legs (2009)
- Able Bodies (2012)
- Absent Sounds (2014)
- Everything Feels Better Now (2016)
- Dimly Lit (2019)
- Head Void (2024)

EPs

- Today We Are Born (2008)
- Acoustic EP (2011)
- Wanderer (2016)

Others

- EFBN TAPES (2016)
