= Absent Sounds =

Studio album by From Indian Lakes
- Released: October 4, 2014
- Genre: Indie rock, emo, post-rock
- Length: 34:45
- Label: Triple Crown

From Indian Lakes chronology
Able Bodies (2012)	Absent Sounds (2014)	Everything Feels Better Now (2016)

Professional ratings
Aggregate scores
Source	Rating
Metacritic	88/100
Review scores
Source	Rating
Absolute Punk	(8.9/10)

Absent Sounds is the third studio album by American band From Indian Lakes. It was released in October 2014, on the label Triple Crown.

== Track list ==
No.	Title	Length
1.	"Come in This Light"	2:52
2.	"Label This Love"	3:42
3.	"Breathe, Desperately"	3:58
4.	"Sleeping Limbs"	3:12
5.	"Am I Alive"	3:13
6.	"Ghost"	3:49
7.	"Awful Things"	3:32
8.	"Runner"	3:11
9.	"Search for More"	3:17
10.	"Fog"	3:59
