= StoryForge Labs =

StoryForge Labs, L.L.C.
- Type: LLC
- Industry: Entertainment
- Founded: New London, Connecticut, USA (2009)
- Headquarters: New London, CT, USA
- Key people: Chris Conway; Robert King; Steve Lettieri
- Products: Web Series, Films
- Website: StoryForge Labs

StoryForge Labs produces films, web series, and an online comic series with a focus on science fiction entertainment. One of StoryForge Labs creations is the Internet site: SciFinal. Created in October 2009, SciFinal is a directory for online sci-fi series, mainly for "indie sci-fi productions" to help them gain notice amongst more mainstream popular sci-fi films and television series.

== Productions ==
StoryForge Labs produced its first web series Zerks Log that launched in March 2009. The sci-fi comedy web series consists of logs by an alien captain commanding his first starship. It the first season, eighteen episodes were filmed and created. In conjunction with the web series, an online comic series In the Engine Room was created; set on Zerks' ship, Venturi 553, the comic follows the adventures of engineers working on the ship.

StoryForge Labs produced and released the sci-fi short film Burn in 2009. The film is set in a post-apocalyptic future where a man is trying to defend his house from being burned after a virus has spread around the world causing people to go mad.

s01dier (soldier zero one) is a short film/web series currently in production by StoryForge Labs. The sci-fi story is about a clone soldier trying to figure out where he comes from. The film was shot on location at the Baltic Textile Mills in Sprague, Connecticut.

The company also has a number of other projects in various stages of development, including the sci-fi feature project Transvoyance.

== See also ==
- Killer Minnow
