= Sour Soul (band) =

Mexican indie rock band

Sour Soul is a four piece indie/psychedelic rock act formed in Mexico City in 2007. They quickly built a loyal following by delivering high energy performances. In 2008, the band released its debut album entitled Liquid Sky Divers, which was co-produced by music legend Stephen Stuart Short. Sour Soul re-released the album in 2010 with 5 new tracks produced by themselves.

In 2011, the band released its highly anticipated encore album; L'appel du Vide. Grammy award winner, Justin J Leeah (At the Drive-In, Conor Oberst, Yeah Yeah Yeahs), engineered this experimental album that took the group's sound in directions they had never gone before. Their artistic bravery was not overlooked. On March 8–14, 2011, Sour Soul's single - "Fum Fum Fum/Rather Spectacular" from L'appel du Vide was chosen by Starbucks (Mexico) as their "Music Pick of The Week". Most recently, the band released a split vinyl EP, which includes their new single Kill-A-Head, a hardcore rock song with guitars that reminds you of Rage Against The Machine.

In addition to the cities and festivals in Mexico that the group has played, Sour Soul has toured the U.S six times in two years. The band has performed in most of the major music markets in the US including Los Angeles, Knoxville, TN, Chicago, New York City, Brooklyn, Austin, Denver, and New Orleans. In 2011, the band played 103 shows across the US; making a total of 207 shows performed in the US between 2009 and 2011.

== Members ==
- Marco Paul - Vocals, Bass, Sitar, Piano, Hammond
- Javier Alejandre - Lead guitar, Bass
- Nicolas Detta - Percussion, Drums
- David - Drums, Bass

== Former members ==
- Juanra Urrusti - Vocals, Banjo, Rhythmic Guitar

== Discography ==
- Liquid Sky Divers (Dec/2008)
- Liquid Sky Divers Reissue (Mar/2010)
- L'appel du vide (Feb/2011)
- Split Vinyl EP Kill-A-Head (Dec/2011)
- "Shadow Order" (Sept/2013)
