= Head Void =

Studio album by From Indian Lakes
- Released: March 15, 2024
- Studio: Joe Vann's home studio
- Genre: Indie rock
- Length: 32:27
- Language: English
- Label: little shuteye

From Indian Lakes chronology
Dimly Lit (2019)	Head Void (2024)

This song tries to get into that space we can all relate to but can't easily explain, when you are in the space between new love and heartbeat, kind of floating with no feelings left. Your body and spirit kind of raw from the extreme back and forth of emotions, on your way over that hill to the otherside where joy and normalcy sits. When I hear it I get very emotional. It puts me in those spaces, romantic nostalgia, loss of a loved one.

—Vocalist and lead songwriter Joe Vann on the meaning of album closer "Keep Me"

Head Void is the sixth studio album by American indie rock band From Indian Lakes. It has received positive reviews from critics.

== Reception ==
Sunnyvale of Sputnikmusic rated this album 3.5 out of 5, calling it "an album with a lot of great songs" that improves upon the 2019 release Dimly Lit, but ultimately "a mild disappointment in its role as From Indian Lakes' long-awaited return". Editors at Stereogum chose this as Album of the Week and critic Chris DeVille emphasized the listening experience of being overwhelmed by the drones and rhythms in the music, combined with language that "is poetic and thought-provoking, not opaque but leaving much to the imagination".

Staff at Consequence of Sound included this among the best albums of May, with Paolo Ragusa writing that "it sounds like mastery.".

== Track listing ==
All songs written by Joe Vann

1. "Water" – 2:03
2. "Holy" – 3:37
3. "The Flow" – 4:04
4. "The Lines" – 3:24
5. "The Wilderness" – 2:21
6. "Hold Me Down" – 3:49
7. "I Lay Different" – 2:17
8. "Spilling Over" – 2:41
9. "Shrine" – 3:05
10. "Keep Me" – 5:06

== Personnel ==
From Indian Lakes

- Joe Vann – instrumentation, vocals, audio engineering

Additional personnel

- Matthew Bedrosian – audio engineering, mixing
- Soren Bryce – additional vocals on "Shrine"
- Adolf Vatnikaj – artwork
- Will Yip – audio mastering

== See also ==
- 2024 in American music
- List of 2024 albums
