= Chukchansi Gold Resort & Casino =

Native American casino in California

Coordinates: 37.211254°N 119.698903°W

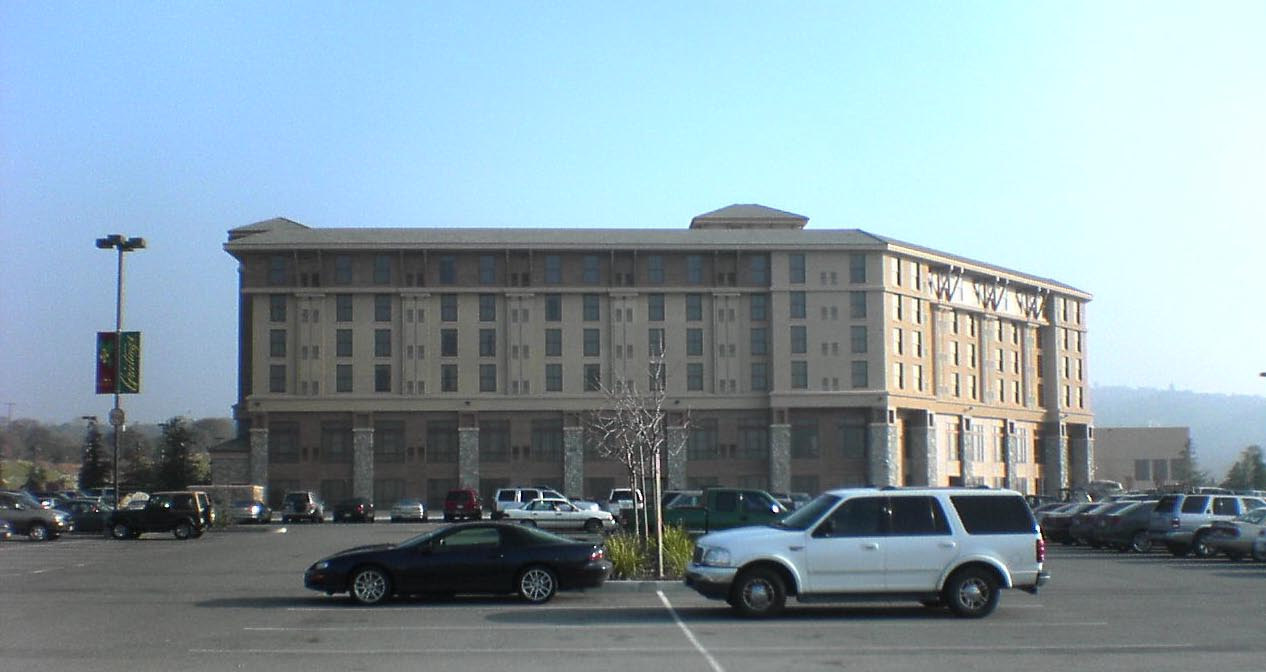
- Interactive map of Chukchansi Gold Resort & Casino
- Location: 711 Lucky Lane Coarsegold, California 93614
- Opened: June 25, 2003
- No. of rooms: 400+
- Gaming space: 56,000 sq ft (5,200 m^{2})
- Notable restaurants: California Market Buffet; Vintage Steakhouse; Nativos; Noodle Bar Asian Bistro; Goldfields Cafe; The Bakery; Firehouse Lounge
- Casino type: Land-based
- Owner: Picayune Rancheria of Chukchansi Indians
- Renovated in: 2005
- Website: http://www.chukchansigold.com/

Chukchansi Gold Resort & Casino is a Native American casino located just off of State Route 41 in Coarsegold, California, between Fresno and Yosemite National Park. It is owned and operated by the Picayune Rancheria of Chukchansi Indians.

The 56,000-square-foot (5,200 m^{2}) casino has 1,800 slot machines, and 43 table games. Chukchansi Gold Resort & Casino features a 370-seat buffet, Vintage Steakhouse, over 400 hotel rooms and suites, a full service spa and various other amenities.

== History ==
In June 2000, the Picayune Rancheria Tribe of Chukchansi Indians announced plans of constructing a resort casino close to Yosemite National Park. Construction was slated to begin in August 2000, but problems delayed groundbreaking. In March 2002, the resort casino was approved by the National Indian Gaming Commission. On October 29, 2002, groundbreaking for the Chuckchansi Gold Resort and Casino began. The forecast cost of the project was $150 million.

The casino opened on June 25, 2003, while the resort opened on August 22, 2003. In 2006, the casino bought the naming rights to Chukchansi Park in Fresno.

=== Armed Takeover and Reopening ===
On October 9, 2014, a confrontation occurred when a group of armed police officers and rival factions entered the casino in an attempt to take over control, handcuffing and detaining officers and employees reporting to the existing leadership. The casino was closed on the following day. Ultimately 15 people were charged in the takeover, including active-duty police officers.

The tribe brought in investments and new casino leadership to revamp operations and reopen the casino. Bradley Tusk and Christian Goode provided financing through Ivory Gaming Group, and Goode became the Chief Operations officer Christian Goode. Goode negotiated with the NIGC and local officials in California, and reached a new deal with Unite Here! Local 19 on an agreement to guarantee good paying jobs and benefits for about 700 casino employees with annual wage increases. The Tribe has also named Phil Hogen, former Chairman of the NIGC as Chairman of Chukchansi Tribal Gaming Commission and Joe Smith, former Director of Audits and Finance for NIGC as Commissioner of the Tribe's Gaming Commission.

The Casino reopened on December 31, 2015, and a formal Grand Reopening Ceremony took place on January 15, 2016.

== See also ==
- Chukchansi language
