= Love the Noise =

Love The Noise

Studio album by Camera Can't Lie
- Released: May 2005
- Recorded: 2005 at Minneapolis, MN
- Genre: Rock, Alternative
- Length: 43:00
- Label: Independent
- Producer: Matt Goldman

Camera Can't Lie chronology
Love The Noise (2005)	Camera Can't Lie EP (2007)

Professional ratings
Review scores
Source	Rating
iLike	4.5/5 stars

Love The Noise was the first full-length record released by the indie rock band Camera Can't Lie. It was re-released in 2006 and remixed by Matt Goldman (Copeland, Cartel). Songs off the album received strong air-time on Midwest indie radio stations.

== Track listing ==
1. "Forever" - 3:57
2. "One Last Sunset" - 4:12
3. "My Revelation" - 3:59
4. "Theme from Chapter Thirteen" - 5:30
5. "Stories In a Star" - 3:21
6. "To: the Desire for Perseverance" - 3:56
7. "Being Broken Is a Beautiful Thing" - 1:31
8. "A Helpful Imperfection" - 3:23
9. "Still Sweet Silence" - 4:34
10. "Nights Turned Day" - 4:22
11. "Love the Noise" - 4:16
