= The Other Side of the Tracks =

- Theatrical release poster
- Directed by: A. D. Calvo
- Written by: A. D. Calvo
- Produced by: Howard Baldwin; Karen Baldwin; Michael Bolton; Patrick Hadley
- Starring: Brendan Fehr; Chad Lindberg; Tania Raymonde
- Cinematography: Stephen Sheridan
- Edited by: A. D. Calvo
- Music by: Joe Carrano
- Production companies: Goodnight Film; Hadley Films
- Distributed by: Artist View Entertainment; MTI Home Video; Showtime
- Release date: March 28, 2008 (Kent Film Festival)
- Running time: 92 minutes
- Country: United States
- Language: English
- Budget: $3 million

The Other Side of the Tracks (also known as The Haunting of Amelia) is a 2008 independent fantasy film that was written and directed by A. D. Calvo, and is his feature film directorial debut. The movie had its world premiere on March 28, 2008, at the Kent Film Festival and premiered on Showtime on December 2, 2010. It was released onto DVD later that same month under the title The Haunting of Amelia.

== Plot ==
Ten years after a tragic train accident killed his girlfriend, Josh finds himself haunted by disturbing visions from somewhere between the world of the living and the dead—haunting memories that keep him from moving on. His buddy, back in town for their high school reunion, tries to wake Josh from his painful past, but a mysterious young waitress offers a seductive alternative.

== Cast ==
- Brendan Fehr as Josh Stevens
- Chad Lindberg as Rusty Miller
- Tania Raymonde as Emily "Amelia" Meyers
- Beatrice Rosen as Marcy
- Natassia Malthe as Lucinda
- Stephnie Weir as Ann
- Sam Robards as David
- Shirley Knight as Helen

== Reception ==
Critical reception for the film under both titles has been predominantly negative. Film Threat reviewed an early cut of The Other Side of the Tracks, which they criticized for being too predictable. DVD Verdict panned the movie, which they found "pretty forgettable". HorrorNews.net (who reviewed the film under the title of The Haunting of Amelia) commented that the movie was more coming of age than scary and that the film would be appeal most to fans of light horror.

=== Awards ===
- Best Feature Film - SENE Film Festival 2009
- Audience Choice Feature - Kent Film Festival 2008
- Best Cinematography - Connecticut Film Festival 2008
- Best Soundtrack - Connecticut Film Festival 2008

== Soundtrack ==
The Other Side of the Tracks features a variety of indie music including bands/artists like: This World Fair, The Alternate Routes, Brightwood, Camera Can't Lie, Windsor Drive, Volker Hinkel, and John Ralston.

The film features a previously unreleased version of Plastic Soul by This World Fair—best known for their hit "Don't Make Me Wait" from the Disturbia soundtrack. The film also features "Gone, Gone, Gone", a song by John Ralston—a BMI “top pick” and opening act for Dashboard Confessional.

== See also ==
- List of ghost films
