= Picayune Rancheria of Chukchansi Indians =

Total population
- 1200 enrolled members (2010)

Regions with significant populations
- United States (California)

Languages
- English, Chukchansi

Religion
- Traditional tribal religion, Christianity

Related ethnic groups
- other Yokuts people

Location of Picayune Rancheria

The Picayune Rancheria of Chukchansi Indians of California is a federally recognized tribe of indigenous people of California, affiliated with the Chukchansi subgroup of the Foothills Yokuts. The Picayune Rancheria, founded in 1912 and located in Coarsegold, California, covers 160 acres (1 km^{2}) in Madera County and serves as the tribal land.

The tribe has historically confronted numerous challenges, including European colonization, displacement, and loss of land. In response, they have pursued cultural and economic revitalization efforts, notably with the opening of the Chukchansi Gold Resort & Casino in 2003. Various initiatives have been undertaken to revive the Chukchansi language and to maintain the tribe's cultural heritage.

The tribal governance is based in Coarsegold and consists of a seven-member council. Economic activities of the Picayune Rancheria have expanded into investments into retail, construction and other areas. However, the tribe has faced issues related to the disenrollment of a significant portion of its members following the casino's opening.

== History ==
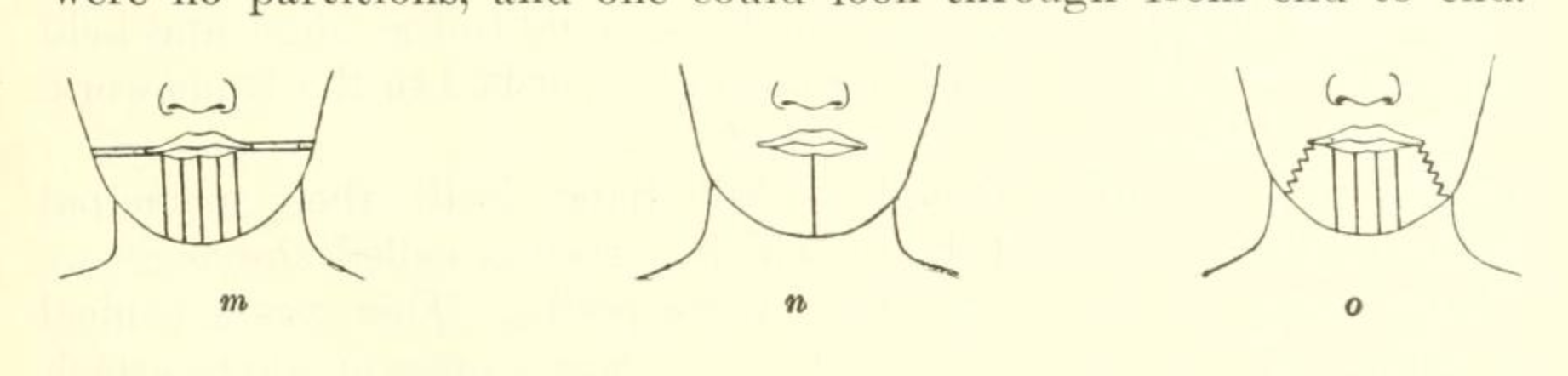
Traditional Chukchansi women's tattoos

The Picayune Rancheria of the Chukchansi Indians is affiliated to the Chukchansi Yokuts culture, indigenous to Central California. This group has occupied the San Joaquin Valley and Sierra Nevada foothills for over 12,000 years. The Chukchansi territory has traditionally spanned from the Sierra Nevada foothills to the Fresno and Chowchilla River valleys and down to the Tehachapi Mountains. Today, many Chukchansi reside near their tribal headquarters in the Picayune Rancheria, approximately 30 miles north of Fresno.

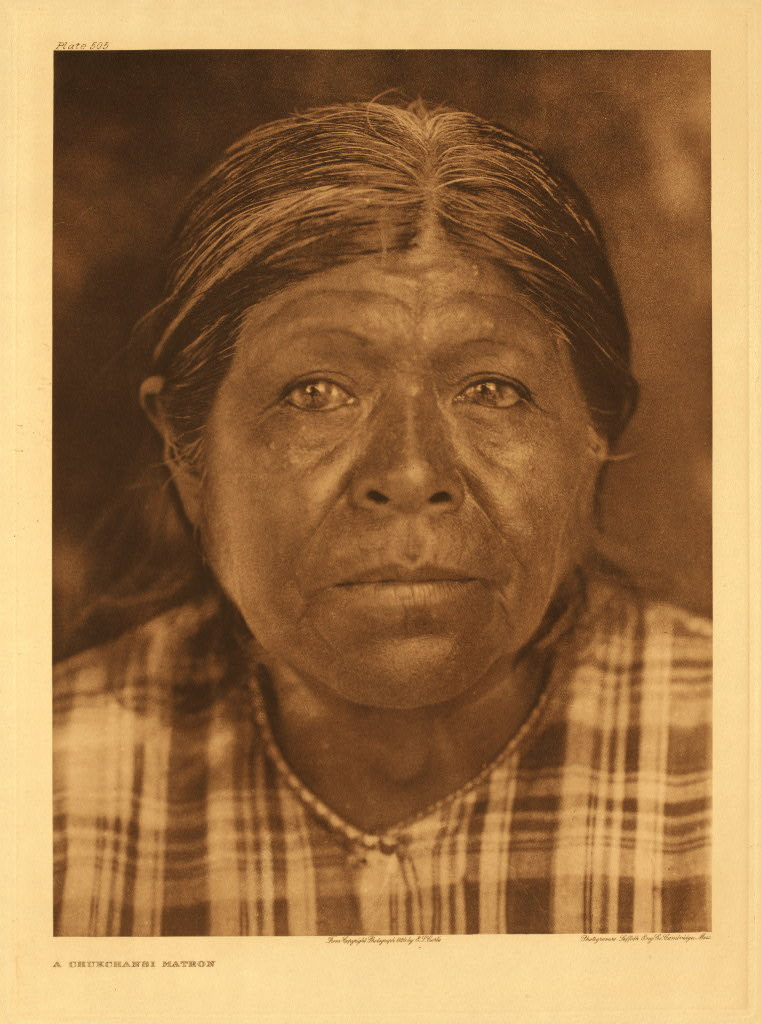
Photo of Chukchansi woman

The Chukchansi language, part of the broader Yokuts linguistic classification, reflects the diversity of approximately 60 tribes identified by anthropologists, each with distinct dialects but sharing cultural similarities.

Historically, the Chukchansi people were adept at utilizing their environment, engaging in farming, hunting, and gathering using advanced techniques. They relied on various animals for protein and employed innovative methods, such as decoys, for hunting. Their diet was complemented by plants, nuts, and seeds, particularly acorns, which were abundant in summer. Fire played a crucial role in their lifestyle, used not only for cooking but also for managing land and hunting grounds.

Following European contact, including Spanish missionaries and American settlers, the Chukchansi population faced significant challenges, including disease and displacement, dramatically reducing their numbers. The discovery of gold further exacerbated their loss of land and rights under American governance. In the early 20th century, the U.S. government allocated land to landless Native Californians, forming Rancherias. However, the Chukchansi experienced a period of federal non-recognition and land loss until their federal recognition was reinstated in 1983, although they initially remained landless.

Awani descendants from Yosemite Valley are also enrolled in the Picayune Rancheria.

In recent years, the Chukchansi have worked to reclaim their heritage and land, notably establishing the Chukchansi Gold Resort & Casino, marking a step toward economic and cultural revitalization.

== Education Programs ==
The tribe promotes education and has collaborated with Fresno State's Department of Linguistics since June 2009 to revive its nearly extinct language through the Chukchansi Yokuts Revitalization Project. With only a few native speakers remaining, the tribe partnered with the university and contributed $1 million in 2012 to support the language's preservation. The tribe also established the Picayune Rancheria Chukchansi Scholarship at Fresno State to support students with an interest in Native American culture. Moreover, the tribe offers a range of educational programs, scholarships, and internships for its members. They prioritize early education to support the educational success of Native American children and families, focusing on maintaining and sharing their cultural heritage.

== Government ==
The tribe's administrative center is in Coarsegold, California, managed by a seven-member tribal council elected by the community. Annual Tribal Council elections are overseen by an election committee, adhering to the tribe's constitutional guidelines. Eligible candidates and officers must be qualified voters residing within a 75-mile radius of the Picayune Reservation. General eligibility requires tribal members to be 18 years or older and have attended at least eight council meetings. For officer positions, candidates must be 25 years or older and also meet the meeting attendance requirement.

== Rancheria ==
Founded in 1912, the Picayune Rancheria (37°12′41″N 119°42′03″W) is 160 acres (650,000 m^{2}) large and located in Madera County, in Coarsegold, California. The community of Yosemite Lakes is also nearby.

The name of the rancheria in the Chukchansi language is Gadnew.

== Economic development ==
The tribe operates the Chukchansi Gold Resort and Casino and associated dining venues in Coarsegold. They also hold naming rights to Chukchansi Park in Fresno.

- MightyOak Capital is a diversified venture capital, merchant banking, and real estate firm in Central California, focusing on passive investments, mergers, acquisitions, and real estate development.
- Mighty Builders, established in 1987, is a prominent commercial construction company in Central California and the U.S., specializing in Indian Country and self-storage projects, with licenses in California, Nevada, and Hawaii.
- Yosemite Lumber, founded in 1953, serves as a leading lumber and construction supply wholesaler in Central California, catering to both commercial and residential contractors.
- Chukchansi Crossing, positioned on Highway 41 near the Chukchansi Gold Resort and Casino, plans to feature restaurants, retail spaces, and an advanced fuel and travel center, promoting Native American products.
- Blue King Inc., owned by the Picayune Rancheria of the Chukchansi Indians, operates as a tribal lending entity, subjecting users to the laws and jurisdiction of the tribe.
- Willow Glen Smoke Shop, established in 2011 by Chukchansi Inc., is a tribal-owned retailer offering Native American tobacco products in California.
- Sportsmen's Den, holding a Federal Firearms License, operates in Oakhurst and Mariposa, CA, offering services related to firearms transactions.
- FOI Commercial Interiors was acquired by the Chukchansi Indian Tribe in 2010, aligning with the tribe's values and expanding business opportunities in interior design and client services.

== Disenrollment controversy ==
Since the Chukchansi Gold Resort and Casino opened in 2003, the Chukchansi Tribe has disenrolled more than half its members. Disenrollment involves removing individuals from tribal membership, denying them various federal tribal benefits including educational support, land rights, tax advantages, medical care, and income from tribal enterprises like casinos.

Following the casino's opening, hundreds of members were disenrolled, resulting in increased financial shares for the remaining members. Those disenrolled included individuals with verified ancestry and rights, as well as some of the last speakers of the Chukchansi language. By 2013, tribal membership reportedly halved from approximately 1,800 to 900.

In 2012, the Ramirezes family's legal challenge asserted their exclusive legitimacy as tribe members, but the case was dismissed. February 2012 saw the election of leaders opposed to disenrollment, but the standing council members disputed the election results, leading to a standoff. Protests escalated when supporters of the new leaders occupied a tribal building, leading to confrontations involving pepper spray and burning logs. Law enforcement from Fresno and Madera Counties, alongside the California Highway Patrol, intervened.

In February 2014, the Bureau of Indian Affairs intervened by reinstating the 2010 Tribal Council, recognized as the last uncontested election, as a temporary measure to alleviate the conflict until a new council could be elected.

In 2019, more than 60 members were expelled from the tribe, and in 2023, an additional 49 members faced disenrollment. This reduction in total membership has resulted in an increase in the monthly payouts for the remaining members. The tribe's casino reportedly generated close to $44 million in revenue in 2022.

== Education ==
The ranchería is served by the Coarsegold Union Elementary School District and Yosemite Joint Union High School District.
