= Able Bodies =

Studio album by From Indian Lakes
- Released: November 13, 2012
- Genre: Indie rock, alternative rock, folk rock
- Length: 42:52
- Label: Independent

From Indian Lakes chronology
'The Man With Wooden Legs' (2009)	Able Bodies (2012)	Absent Sounds (2014)

Professional ratings
Review scores
Source	Rating
Sputnikmusic	4/5
idobi Radio	4/5
Under the Gun Review	8.5/10

Able Bodies is the second studio album by American band From Indian Lakes. It was originally released independently in November 2012.

== Track listing ==
1. Anything (4:02)
2. We Are Sick (3:10)
3. Paintings (3:14)
4. Breaking My Bones (3:48)
5. I Don’t Know You (3:12)
6. Stay Outside (4:30)
7. Below (4:34)
8. My Mouth, My Lips (4:26)
9. Your Son (3:19)
10. We Follow (3:46)
11. ‘Till I Can Walk (4:50)
