= Coarsegold, California =

Coarsegold
- Census-designated place
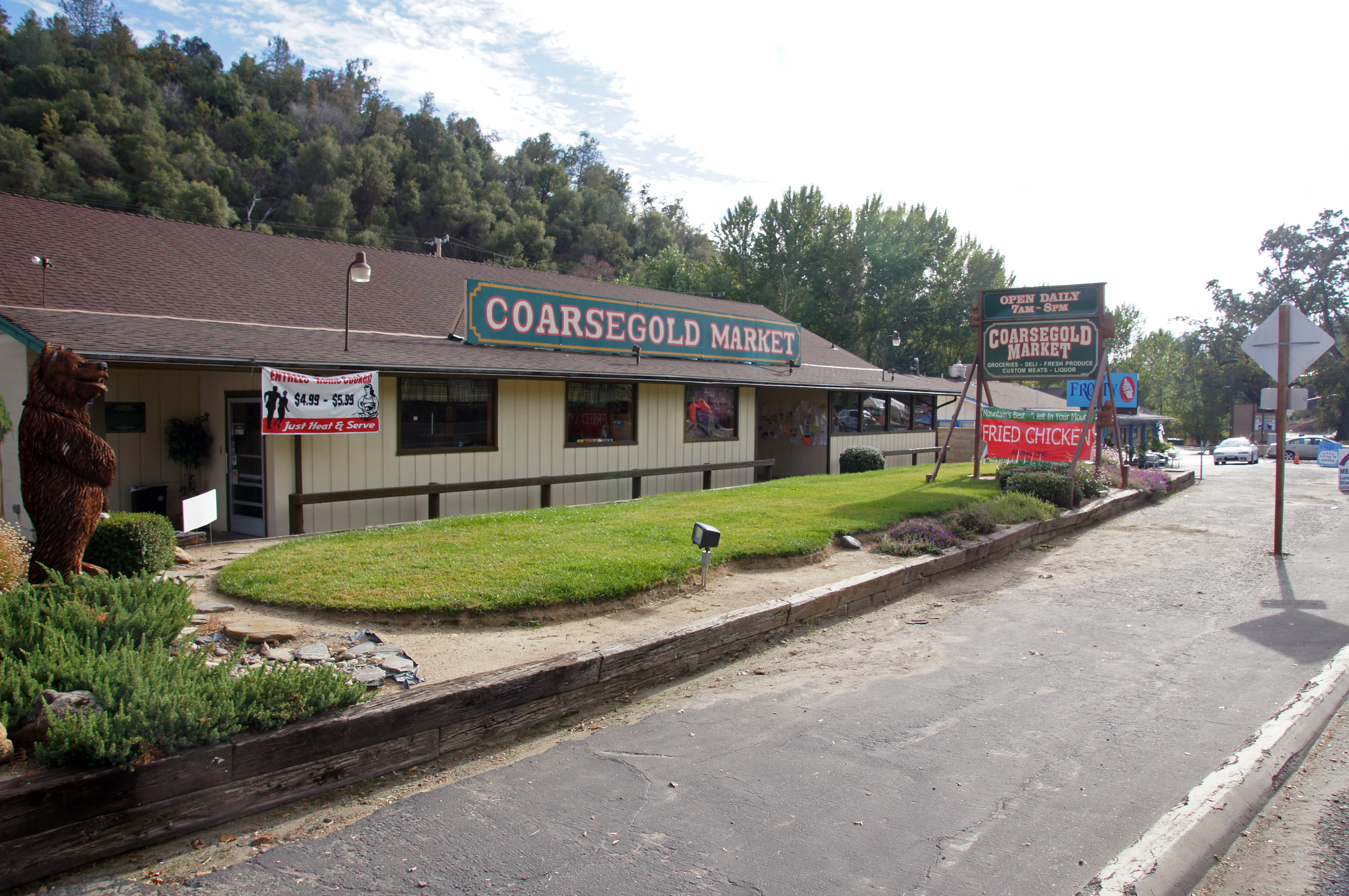
- Coarsegold Market

- Location in Madera County, California

- Location within California Location within the United States
- Coordinates: 37°15′44″N 119°42′04″W
- Country: United States
- State: California
- County: Madera

Area
  - Total: 17.29 sq mi (44.79 km^{2})
  - Land: 17.23 sq mi (44.62 km^{2})
  - Water: 0.066 sq mi (0.17 km^{2}) 0%
- Elevation: 2,218 ft (676 m)

Population (2020)
  - Total: 4,144
  - Density: 240.5/sq mi (92.87/km^{2})
- Time zone: UTC-8 (Pacific (PST))
  - Summer (DST): UTC-7 (PDT)
- ZIP Code: 93614
- GNIS feature IDs: 258494; 2628719
- FIPS code: 06-14288

Coarsegold is a census-designated place in Madera County, California, United States, situated in the central part of the state. As of the 2020 census, it had a population of 4,144. Coarsegold holds historical significance as Madera County's last surviving "gold town" and is notable for its Native American heritage, particularly as the headquarters of the Picayune Rancheria of Chukchansi Indians, a federally recognized tribe. The community celebrates its frontier culture with annual events such as the Coarsegold Rodeo and the Tarantula Awareness Festival. Positioned between Fresno and Yosemite National Park, the town appeals to both retirees and commuters, due to its strategic location along Highway 41.

== Human history ==
=== Native People ===
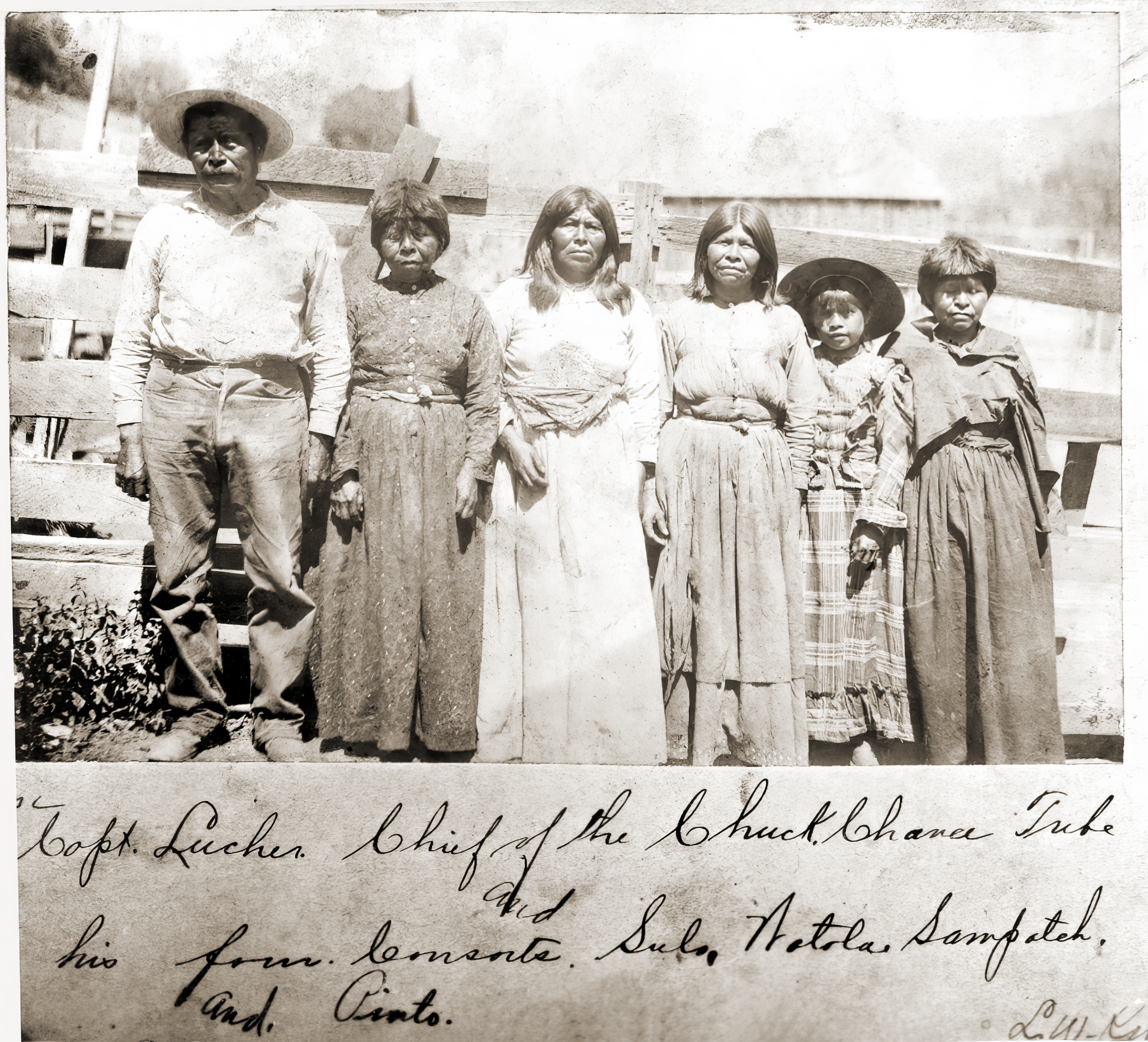
Chukchansi (then spelled "Chuck Chance") in Coarsegold, California. ca.1900

The Chukchansi, native to the Coarsegold region, have a history dating back over 8,000 years. They are part of a larger group known as the Yokuts, classified by anthropologists based on linguistic similarities among approximately 60 tribes in the Central Valley. While these tribes shared cultural traits and languages, they also maintained distinct dialects.

The discovery of gold marked a period of significant disruption for the Chukchansi, characterized by loss of land, spread of diseases, and societal upheaval. These events, coupled with policies of forced assimilation like the removal of children to boarding schools, led to a marked decline in the native population.

=== Gold Rush ===
Following the 1849 gold strike at Coarsegold, miners spread throughout the region, particularly along the Fresno River. By 1852, a settlement had formed at the river's only fordable point, marked by the establishment of a trading post by John Ledford and George M. Carson. Initially constructed from adobe, the site featured a store, saloon, and living quarters.

The trading post changed hands, eventually becoming known under J.L. Hunt and J.R. Roan. During this period, scarce goods led to high prices, especially for whiskey and flour. The area, known as The Crossing, was notorious for violent encounters among miners, leading to numerous burials on a nearby hill.

The Crossing also served as a launch point for the first tourist group to Yosemite Valley and was central to the community's history, including the first private school in California. The area experienced typical frontier challenges such as horse thefts, sluice box robberies, and a significant Chinese population facing theft. To combat lawlessness, locals formed a vigilante group.

In 1856, Fresno County was established, with the area becoming part of the initial supervisorial district. The gold from the region was notably valuable, prompting the construction of infrastructure like schools and mines. Notable individuals from this era include Theodore Thure Strombeck, an early settler and member of the Mariposa Battalion and the local vigilantes.

Coarsegold has previously had several names, including "Coarse Gold", "Gold Gulch", "Michaels", "Oro Grosso", "Texas Flat", and "Coarse Gold Gulch". The place was first called "Texas Flat" after miners from Texas discovered gold there in 1849. By 1874, the name had changed to "Michaels", honoring Charles Michaels, a local merchant. A rival mining camp inhabited by Mexicans there was called "Oro Grosso", the Spanish translation of "coarse gold". The current name derives from the California Gold Rush of the mid-19th century, when prospectors discovered coarse nuggets of gold in a nearby creek. At one time, several dozen gold mines operated in the area.

=== Stagecoach Era ===
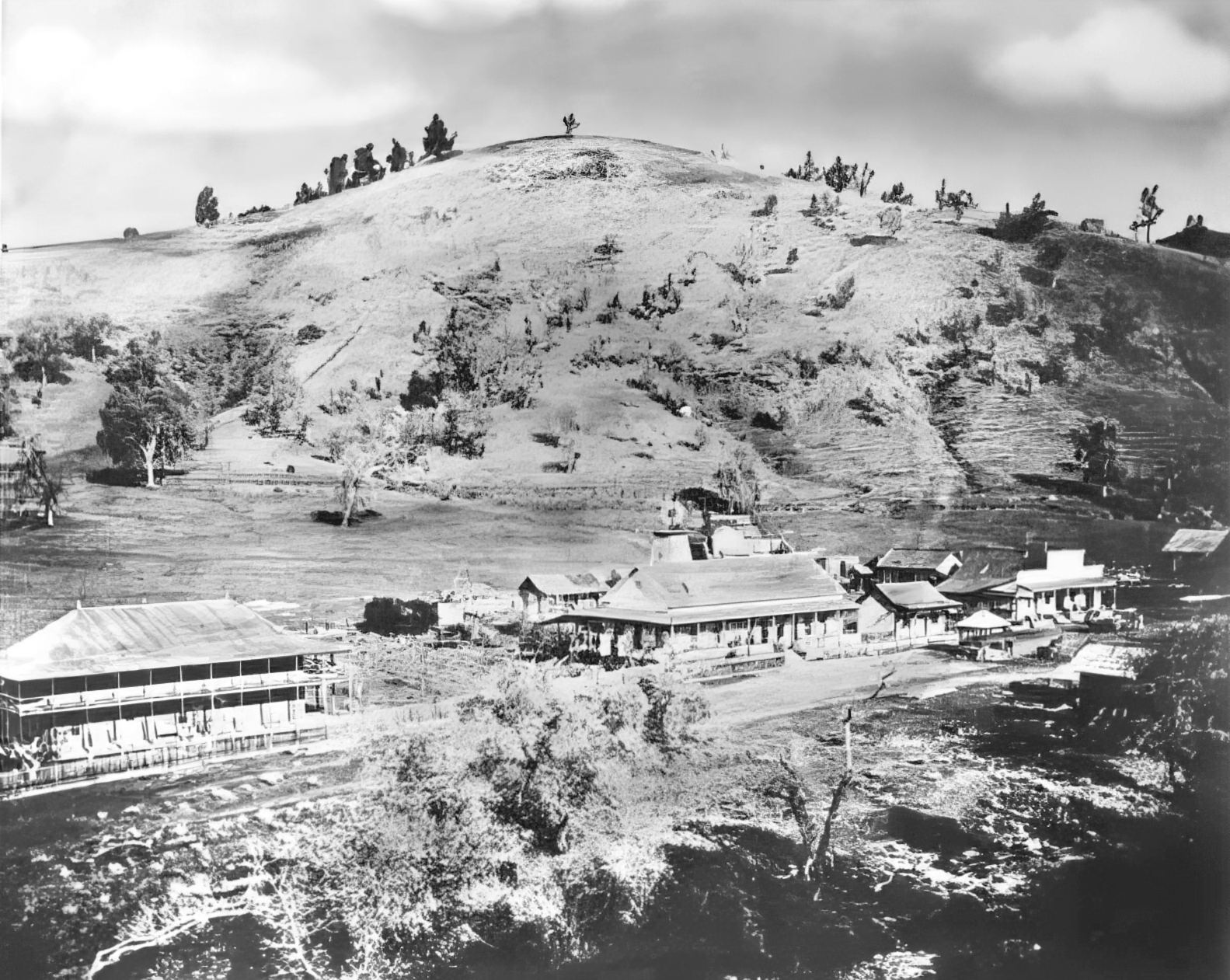
Coarsegold in the 1880s

By the 1860s, Coarsegold became well-known as an important stop for people heading to the mountains for cattle raising, farming, and lumbering. The town grew even more popular after the wagon road to Yosemite Valley was completed in 1876, attracting tourists worldwide. However, in the 1880s, Coarsegold saw less traffic after a new road was built directly from the valley to the mining areas in Grub Gulch and Ahwahnee, leading straight to Yosemite.

The Coarse Gold Gulch post office opened in 1878, changed the name to "Goldgulch" in 1895 and to "Coarsegold" in 1899.

=== Picayune Rancheria ===
By the early 20th century, the number of indigenous people in California, including the Chukchansi, had drastically reduced. In an attempt to address the displacement, the U.S. government created "Rancherias" in 1902. These were smaller than reservations and intended to provide living spaces and means for subsistence. The Rancheria at Picayune was specifically allocated to the Chukchansi in 1912, representing a federal recognition of their land rights, albeit in a limited form.

== Geography ==
Coarsegold is located on Highway 41 between Fresno and the southern entrance to Yosemite National Park, at an elevation of 2,218 ft (676 m). Fresno is 38 miles (61 km) to the south, and the south entrance of Yosemite is 23 miles (37 km) to the north. Nearby communities include Oakhurst 8 miles (13 km) to the north and Yosemite Lakes Park the same distance to the southwest. Indian Lakes Estates is 5 miles (8 km) southeast of the center of Coarsegold.

According to the U.S. Census Bureau, the CDP has an area of 17.3 square miles (45 km^{2}), of which 0.1 square miles (0.3 km^{2}), or 0.38%, are water. The area is drained by Coarse Gold Creek, a south-flowing tributary of the Fresno River.

=== Climate ===
Coarsegold has a Mediterranean climate (Csa according to the Köppen climate classification system) with hot, dry summers and cool, wet winters. Its average annual precipitation is 27.29 in (693 mm). It is located in hardiness zone 8b.

Coarsegold

Climate chart (precipitation, max. and min. temperature)
J	F	M	A	M	J	J	A	S	O	N	D
5.2 54 36	4.8 57 39	4.3 61 41	2 67 45	1 78 52	0.3 87 60	0.1 93 67	0.1 92 66	0.4 86 61	1.5 75 52	2.6 61 42	4.2 54 36
- █ Average max. and min. temperatures in °F
- █ Precipitation totals in inches
- Source: Weather.com
Metric conversion
J	F	M	A	M	J	J	A	S	O	N	D
133 12 2	122 14 4	108 16 5	50 19 7	25 26 11	7.9 31 16	1.8 34 19	1.3 33 19	9.7 30 16	38 24 11	67 16 6	108 12 2
- █ Average max. and min. temperatures in °C
- █ Precipitation totals in mm

== Demographics ==
Historical population
Census	Pop.	Note	%±
2010	1,840		—
2020	4,144		125.2%
U.S. Decennial Census; 1850–1870 1880-1890; 1900 1910 1920; 1930 1940 1950; 1960 1970 1980; 1990 2000 2010

=== 2020 census ===
As of the 2020 census, Coarsegold had a population of 4,144. The median age was 53.3 years. 18.8% of residents were under the age of 18 and 32.4% of residents were 65 years of age or older. For every 100 females there were 94.8 males, and for every 100 females age 18 and over there were 93.2 males age 18 and over.

0.0% of residents lived in urban areas, while 100.0% lived in rural areas.

There were 1,669 households in Coarsegold, of which 21.5% had children under the age of 18 living in them. Of all households, 57.2% were married-couple households, 14.1% were households with a male householder and no spouse or partner present, and 23.3% were households with a female householder and no spouse or partner present. About 24.7% of all households were made up of individuals and 17.9% had someone living alone who was 65 years of age or older.

There were 1,837 housing units, of which 9.1% were vacant. The homeowner vacancy rate was 2.0% and the rental vacancy rate was 3.2%.

Racial composition as of the 2020 census
Race	Number	Percent
White	3,164	76.4%
Black or African American	20	0.5%
American Indian and Alaska Native	260	6.3%
Asian	63	1.5%
Native Hawaiian and Other Pacific Islander	0	0.0%
Some other race	189	4.6%
Two or more races	448	10.8%
Hispanic or Latino (of any race)	589	14.2%

=== Demographic estimates ===
A notable 90.0% of Coarsegold homes are owner-occupied, well above California's 55.8% average. Additionally, linguistic diversity is lower here, with only 7.1% speaking a non-English language at home, compared to 44.4% statewide.

Demographically, Coarsegold has fewer foreign-born residents (3.9%) than California overall, and 17.8% of its residents are veterans.

Lastly, Coarsegold residents face longer commutes than most Californians, with an average travel time to work of 41.7 minutes, surpassing the state average of 28.3 minutes.

=== Income and poverty ===
Economically, Coarsegold has a median household income of $81,814, slightly below the state's $91,551. However, its poverty rate is lower at 8.2%, compared to California's 12.2%. The town's employment rate is 49.8%, under the state's 60.0%, and 22.7% of its residents have at least a bachelor's degree, less than the state's 37.0%.

== Culture ==
Since 2008, Chukchansi language courses have been offered at the local elementary school in Coarsegold. By 2012, these classes expanded to include both children and adults.

Initiated in 1953 to celebrate the town's centennial, the Coarsegold Rodeo has become an annual tradition, occurring on the first weekend of May.

Additionally, the Tarantula Awareness Festival is held yearly in Coarsegold. This event corresponds with the mating season of local tarantulas, marking the transition to cooler temperatures and the start of autumn rains. It provides an opportunity to learn about and observe these spiders in their natural habitat.

== Notable people ==
- Creed Bratton, actor and musician; raised in Coarsegold
- Richard Kiel, actor; lived in Coarsegold from 1980 to 2002
- Lee Newton, actress; raised in Coarsegold
- Grace Lee Whitney, actress; lived in Coarsegold from 1993 until her death in 2015

== Media ==
The 1993 adventure game Freddy Pharkas: Frontier Pharmacist is set in a fictional 1880s Coarsegold and was published by Sierra On-Line, then based in nearby Oakhurst. The company also released Cranston Manor in 1981, another game set in Coarsegold.

The Coarsegold (Coarse Gold) mining site is the destination for stars Joel McCrea and Randolph Scott in the 1962 film Ride the High Country.
