= Grub Gulch, California =

Grub Gulch
- Former settlement
- Location in California
- Coordinates: 37°19′29″N 119°46′15″W
- Country: United States
- State: California
- County: Madera
- Elevation: 2,474 ft (754 m)

Grub Gulch (also Grubgulch) is a former settlement in Madera County, California, United States. The town's name was earned by its lucky reputation that prospectors could count on panning enough gold to "grubstake themselves into better times." It was located 10.5 miles (17 km) northeast of Raymond on present day Road 600.

== History ==
Grub Gulch developed after the Gambetta Mine opened in 1880. Other local mines included the Mammoth Mine, the Enterprise Mine, and the Josephine Mine.

The Grubgulch post office operated from 1883 to 1918. Up to five thousand people lived in Grub Gulch from the mid-1880s to the late 1890s making it the mountain area's largest mining community at the time. In 1900, Grub Gulch had a general store, two hotels and five saloons, but never a church. There were twenty-four mines within a five mile radius. President Theodore Roosevelt visited Grub Gulch in 1903 and said, "this is a bully town".

A combination of factors let to Grub Gulch's demise in the early twentieth century. Development was hampered by lack of water. In 1906, the final mine closed. And the opening of the Yosemite Valley Railroad in 1907 ended the stagecoach route to Yosemite through Grub Gulch.

The town burned down in 1920. Today, a cemetery and historical marker are all that remain.

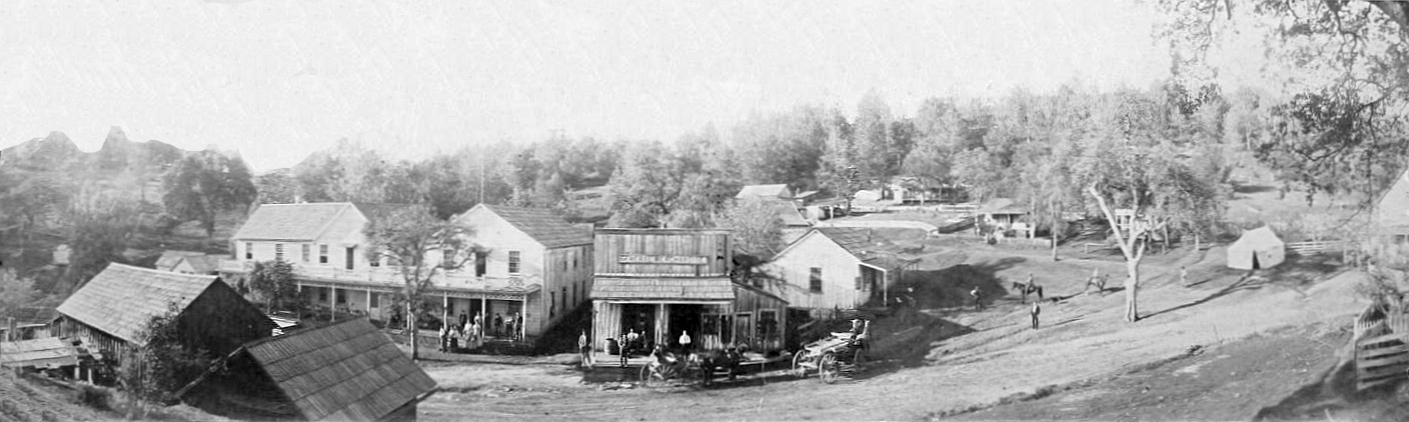
Grub Gulch, circa 1885
