= Camera Can't Lie =

American rock band

- Origin: Owatonna, Minnesota, United States
- Genres: Alternative rock, pop
- Years active: 2005–2012
- Labels: Atlantic Records
- Past members: Eric Arjes; Kyle Lindsay; Josh Bendell; Tim Nustad; Travis Stearns; Gabe Eckers; Jason Hale
- Website: cameracantlie.com

Camera Can't Lie was an American rock band based in Minneapolis, United States. They were discovered and were managed by the Grammy Award-winning record producer, Stephen Short. The band is most widely recognized for their songs, "Shine For Me", used in the 2011 and 2012 Lowe's Home Improvement Holiday TV Ads and "Days & Days", due to the self-produced music video featuring families of active duty US soldiers. The name of Camera Can't Lie is often abbreviated as 'Camera' or 'CCL'. They established themselves early on as an independent touring band, playing between 150-250 shows each year and have toured with artists including Jason Castro, LIVE, The Rocket Summer, This World Fair, Secondhand Serenade, Madina Lake, Between the Trees, and Anberlin.

== History ==
Camera Can't Lie, formed in Owatonna, Minnesota by high school friends Eric Arjes, Kyle Lindsay, Tim Nustad, Gabe Eckers, and Jason Hale were discovered managed by Grammy Award-winning record producer, Stephen Short. Shortly after beginning their relationship with Stephen two members, Hale and Eckers, left the band and were replaced by Travis Stearns and Josh Bendell. The current lineup includes Arjes and Lindsay. In May 2008, they were signed to Atlantic Records. In June 2009, the band signed a deal with music publisher Peermusic.

== Discography ==
- Love The Noise was released independently in 2005 by Camera Can't Lie. It was later remixed in 2006 by producer Matt Goldman.
- Camera Can't Lie EP was the second album release from the band. It was produced in 2007 by Stephen Short (Augustana, This World Fair).
- Days & Days EP was the band's first release for Atlantic Records and is their first release since 2007's self-titled EP. Twenty songs were recorded in 2009 with producer Ron Aniello, the EP featured tracks from the upcoming full-length as well as B-sides not used on the album.
- Not Everyone Leaves EP, released in 2010 on Atlantic Records as a preview of their full-length record.
- "Shine For Me", released in Dec 1, 2011.
- A song from Camera Can't Lie's self-titled EP, "Losing You", is featured and made available on the soundtrack for the 2009 independent mystery film, The Other Side of the Tracks.
- Their song "Losing You" was sampled by rapper Fakemink on the track "Baklava".
