= Yosemite Lakes Park, California =

Unincorporated community in California, United States

Yosemite Lakes
- Census-designated place
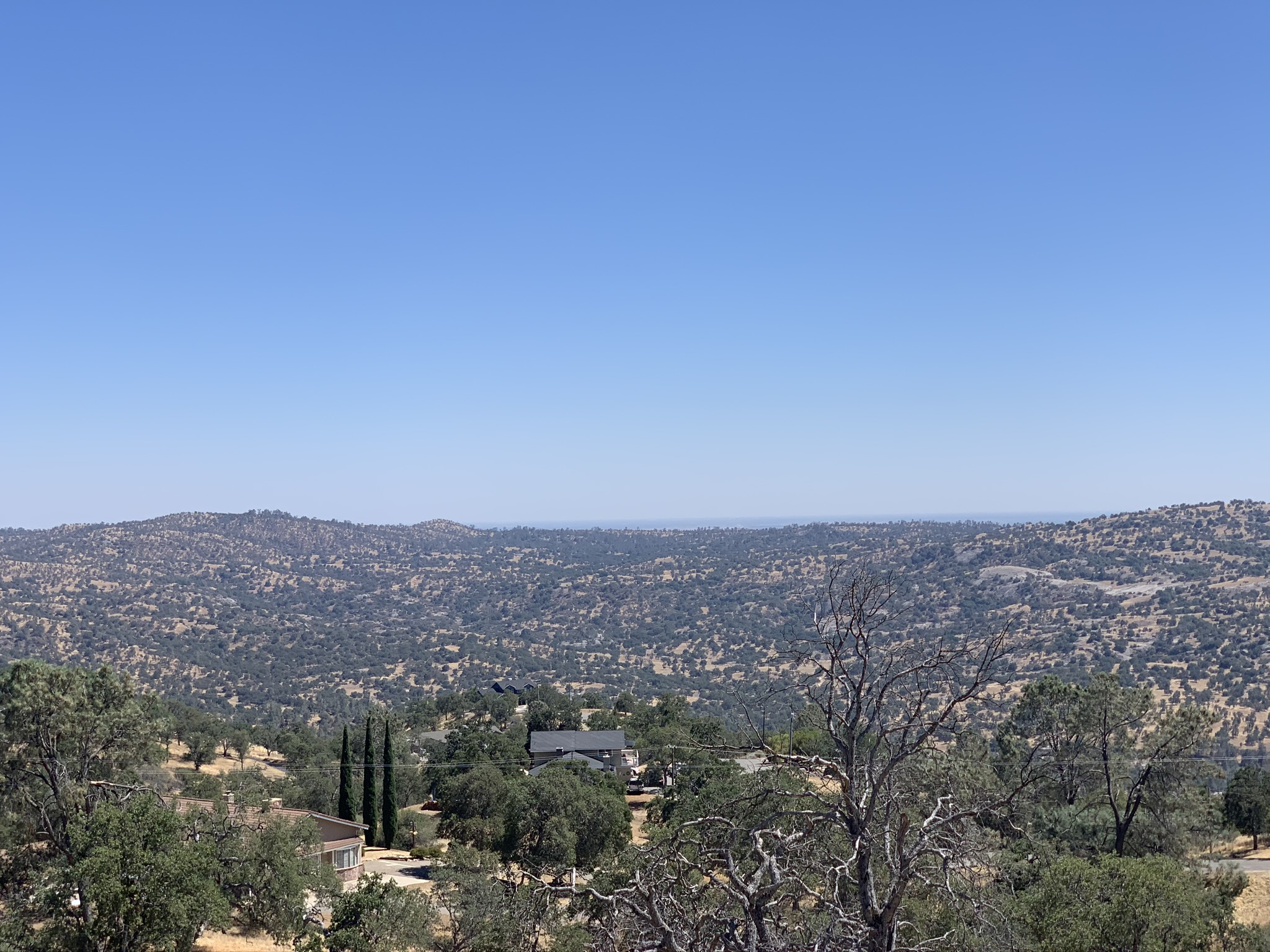
- View of Yosemite Lakes Park from Lilly Mountain

- Location in Madera County and the state of California

- Location in the United States
- Coordinates: 37°11′28″N 119°46′22″W
- Country: United States
- State: California
- County: Madera

Area
  - Total: 20.999 sq mi (54.387 km^{2})
  - Land: 20.902 sq mi (54.136 km^{2})
  - Water: 0.097 sq mi (0.251 km^{2}) 0.46%
- Elevation: 1,263 ft (385 m)

Population (2020)
  - Total: 5,022
  - Density: 240.3/sq mi (92.8/km^{2})
- Time zone: UTC-8 (Pacific)
  - Summer (DST): UTC-7 (PDT)
- ZIP code: 93614 (Coarsegold)
- Area code: 559
- FIPS code: 06-86878
- GNIS feature IDs: 1867075, 2409637

Yosemite Lakes Park is an unincorporated community in Madera County, California, United States. It lies at an elevation of 1,230 feet (370 m). As a census-designated place (CDP) it is known as Yosemite Lakes. It is part of the Madera Metropolitan Statistical Area. The population was 5,022 at the 2020 census.

The area was developed by Titan Group in the 1970s, and includes an equestrian center, clubhouse, and three man-made lakes. Additionally the community has a homeowners association which operates the Blue Heron restaurant and the Fairway Cafe which is situated next to the golf course. The community also supports a local grocery store and other small shops.

== Natural Disasters ==
=== 2013 Arson ===
In 2013 the community was struck by a series of fires which were set over a 46-day period. The next year, Kenneth Jackson and Alice Waterman were both convicted of starting the series fires; in 2018 a Fresno County judge ruled that there had been insufficient evidence to convict the pair on two of the charges. Kenneth Jackson was sentenced to 30 years in prison; in 2021 he became eligible for parole under Proposition 57, which was met with significant community pushback.

== Geography ==
Yosemite Lakes is located in the foothills of the Sierra Nevada at 37°11′28″N 119°46′22″W. Its northwestern border follows road 400 west of Yosemite Springs Parkway to South Lilley Way, and to the south and east it is bound by Coarsegold Creek. The northeastern community border follows to the north and east of Yosemite Springs Parkway, Ranger Circle Drive and North Dome Drive, and it is 34 miles (55 km) north of Fresno. According to the United States Census Bureau, the CDP has a total area of 21.0 square miles (54 km^{2}), of which 0.1 square miles (0.3 km^{2}), or 0.46%, are water.

The highest point in the community is Lilley Mountain, at 1,929 feet (588 m), and was a known landmark for drivers coming from Fresno on the way to Yosemite National Park.

== Demographics ==
Historical population
| Census | Pop. | Note | %± |
|---|---|---|---|
| 1990 | 2,367 | | — |
| 2000 | 4,160 | | 75.7% |
| 2010 | 4,952 | | 19.0% |
| 2020 | 5,022 | | 1.4% |
U.S. Decennial Census; 1990 2000 2010

=== 2020 ===
The 2020 United States census reported that Yosemite Lakes had a population of 5,022. The population density was 240.3 inhabitants per square mile (92.8/km^{2}). The racial makeup of Yosemite Lakes was 78.4% White, 0.7% African American, 1.6% Native American, 2.4% Asian, 0.1% Pacific Islander, 4.6% from other races, and 12.1% from two or more races. Hispanic or Latino of any race were 14.9% of the population.

The whole population lived in households. There were 1,971 households, out of which 25.5% included children under the age of 18, 60.6% were married-couple households, 5.7% were cohabiting couple households, 18.5% had a female householder with no partner present, and 15.3% had a male householder with no partner present. 21.6% of households were one person, and 12.3% were one person aged 65 or older. The average household size was 2.55. There were 1,445 families (73.3% of all households).

The age distribution was 20.1% under the age of 18, 5.6% aged 18 to 24, 19.9% aged 25 to 44, 26.7% aged 45 to 64, and 27.7% who were 65 years of age or older. The median age was 49.4 years. For every 100 females, there were 96.8 males.

There were 2,153 housing units at an average density of 103.0 units per square mile (39.8 units/km^{2}), of which 1,971 (91.5%) were occupied. Of these, 86.7% were owner-occupied, and 13.3% were occupied by renters.

=== 2023 estimates ===
In 2023, the US Census Bureau estimated that 2.6% of the population were foreign-born. Of all people aged 5 or older, 93.6% spoke only English at home, 4.5% spoke Spanish, 1.6% spoke other Indo-European languages, 0.0% spoke Asian or Pacific Islander languages, and 0.3% spoke other languages. Of those aged 25 or older, 97.0% were high school graduates and 31.2% had a bachelor's degree.

The median household income was $100,227, and the per capita income was $41,493. About 4.3% of families and 6.1% of the population were below the poverty line.

== Government ==
In the California State Legislature, Yosemite Lakes is in the 4th senatorial district, represented by Republican Marie Alvarado-Gil, and the 8th Assembly district, represented by Republican David Tangipa.

In the United States House of Representatives, Yosemite Lakes is in California's 5th congressional district, represented by Republican Tom McClintock.
