= This World Fair =

American rock band

- Origin: Minneapolis, Minnesota, U.S.
- Genres: Alternative rock, progressive rock, pop
- Years active: 2005-2009
- Labels: EMI, Rethink
- Past members: Chris Kalgren; Alexander Young; Zach Ojeda; DJ House; Matt Lennander; George Hadfield; Zack Carrol; Tyler Jorenby
- Website: thisworldfair.com

This World Fair was an American rock act based out of Minneapolis, Minnesota. The line-up included the singer-songwriter Chris Kalgren (vocals, piano, guitar), along with a touring band consisting of Alexander Young (drums) and Matt Lennander (guitar). This World Fair internationally released their first full-length album, self-titled This World Fair, on December 16, 2008. This World Fair performed hundreds of shows per year and toured extensively across the United States.

== History ==
This World Fair formerly went by the name 'Kalgren'.

Home, which included "Waiting For You", was released independently in 2003 when This World Fair went by the name Kalgren. Four tracks were awarded Track of the Day by GarageBand.

This World Fair were discovered in 2004 by the girlfriend of their manager, Stephen Short. Under Short the band recorded a five-song EP, So Is Death & Love, in 2005.

In 2007, This World Fair toured with acts such as Under the Influence of Giants, Guster, Phantom Planet and Quietdrive. During early 2008, the band transformed from being a band into the stage-name of lead singer-songwriter Chris Kalgren.

In January 2008, This World Fair headlined a tour across the Midwest. Throughout the month of February 2008, Kalgren produced Ari Herstand's 2008 album, Whispering Endearments, at Pachyderm Studio near Minneapolis. This World Fair headlined the Chipotle Rhythm Kitchen stage at Summerfest in Milwaukee, Wisconsin and co-headlined a national tour with the Universal Motown band Barcelona in the mid-2008.

This World Fair was released on December 16, 2008. The album was originally to be released in 2007, but it faced an eighteen-month delay due to the closing of Rethink. The album is This World Fair's first release on an international scale. It was produced in late 2007 by Al Clay at Sonic Ranch studios. During the writing process for the album, This World Fair worked with Ryan Tedder, the lead singer of OneRepublic, as well as Michael Guy Chislett who is the lead guitarist of The Academy Is. A three-song sampler of this album was released in the iTunes Store on April 16, 2007.

This World Fair recorded and co-wrote the track "Don't Make Me Wait" featured in the Dreamwork's film Disturbia, with Geoff Zanelli, the composer of the score from the film. It was released April 13, 2007. A music video for this song made by Disturbia's director, DJ Caruso, was produced by Lakeshore Records. The music video is included as an extra feature on the home releases of the film.

Music by This World Fair was featured in the second season of The Inferno on MTV.

A song from This World Fair, titled "Plastic Soul", was featured on the soundtrack for the 2008 independent mystery film, The Other Side of the Tracks.

Past This World Fair and Kalgren members include George Hadfield (bass), DJ House (guitar) and Tyler Jorenby (drums).

The band has since had all of their music removed from YouTube and any other streaming services.

There are some songs by "This World Fair," the alternative-rock band formerly known as Kalgren, uploaded by Album Rarities on his YouTube page.
