= Stephen Short =

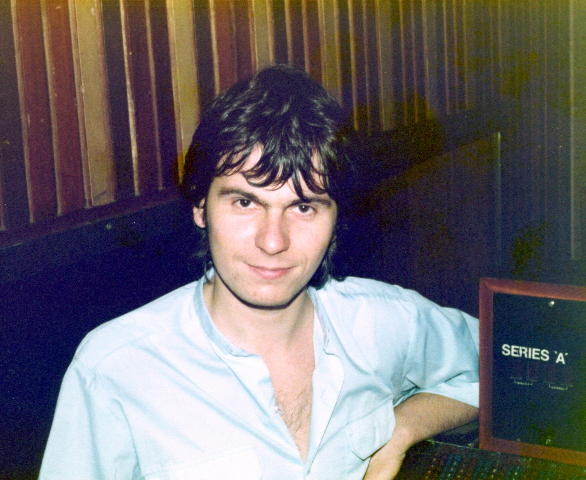

Background information
- Origin: United Kingdom
- Occupation: Record producer
- Years active: 1976–2015

Stephen Short (died 2015) was a British record producer who also operated Ping Pong Music, an artist management company. Songs he worked on went on to become chart-topping singles that had won Grammy Awards, Academy Awards, and Golden Globe Awards.

== 1976–1991: Early years ==
Stephen Short started his career in the music industry in 1976 at Trident Studios in London, UK. Working with musicians such as Kirk Allen and his band Elixir, Marc Bolan, Echo & the Bunnymen, Genesis, Paul McCartney, Peter Gabriel, Queen and Wings, Short went from being a teaboy to becoming senior engineer within two years. One of his earliest production credits is the 1978 Donna Summer song "Last Dance", which he had mixed and had contributed his own back-up vocals. The song went on to win an Academy Award and a Golden Globe for Best Original Song. In 1980, at the age of 24, Short created an investment group with three other investors and purchased Trident Studios. Employing a staff of thirty people, Short and his team became some of the most sought-after producers and engineers in the music industry.

== 1992–2000: Shift to US production ==
In early 1992, Short was invited to the United States to discuss the possibility of opening a US branch of Trident Studios. Following several meetings, Short decided to rather focus on production and to move on from the studio ownership business. After spending a brief amount of time in Los Angeles, California, Short traveled across the United States answering requests to become involved in many different musical projects. During this phase of his career, Short worked with popular musicians such as Remy Zero as well as Phil Collins. Short was awarded a Grammy for his work with the Christian band dc Talk and another Grammy for his work with Chaka Khan. Over the years, Stephen continued producing for major labels such as Epic Records, Capitol Records, and many others. In 1997, the band Ben Folds Five released the song "Steven's Last Night in Town", which is based on Stephen Short's friendship with Ben Folds.

== 2001–2015: Artist management ==
Identifying a need to develop and nurture young artists, Short formed a production & management company. In 2001, Short signed a band he discovered and managed called Limousine to Jimmy Iovine of Interscope Records. Eighteen months later, Short discovered a group called Augustana, and signed them a two million dollar deal with Sony and EMI publishing. In the mid to late 2000s, Short had developed more emerging artists including This World Fair Windsor Drive and Camera Can't Lie.

== Death ==
In the summer of 2015, Short announced he had been battling colon cancer for two years. He died on 9 July 2015.
