= 2016 Republican Party vice presidential candidate selection =

2016 Republican vice presidential nomination
- July 15, 2016
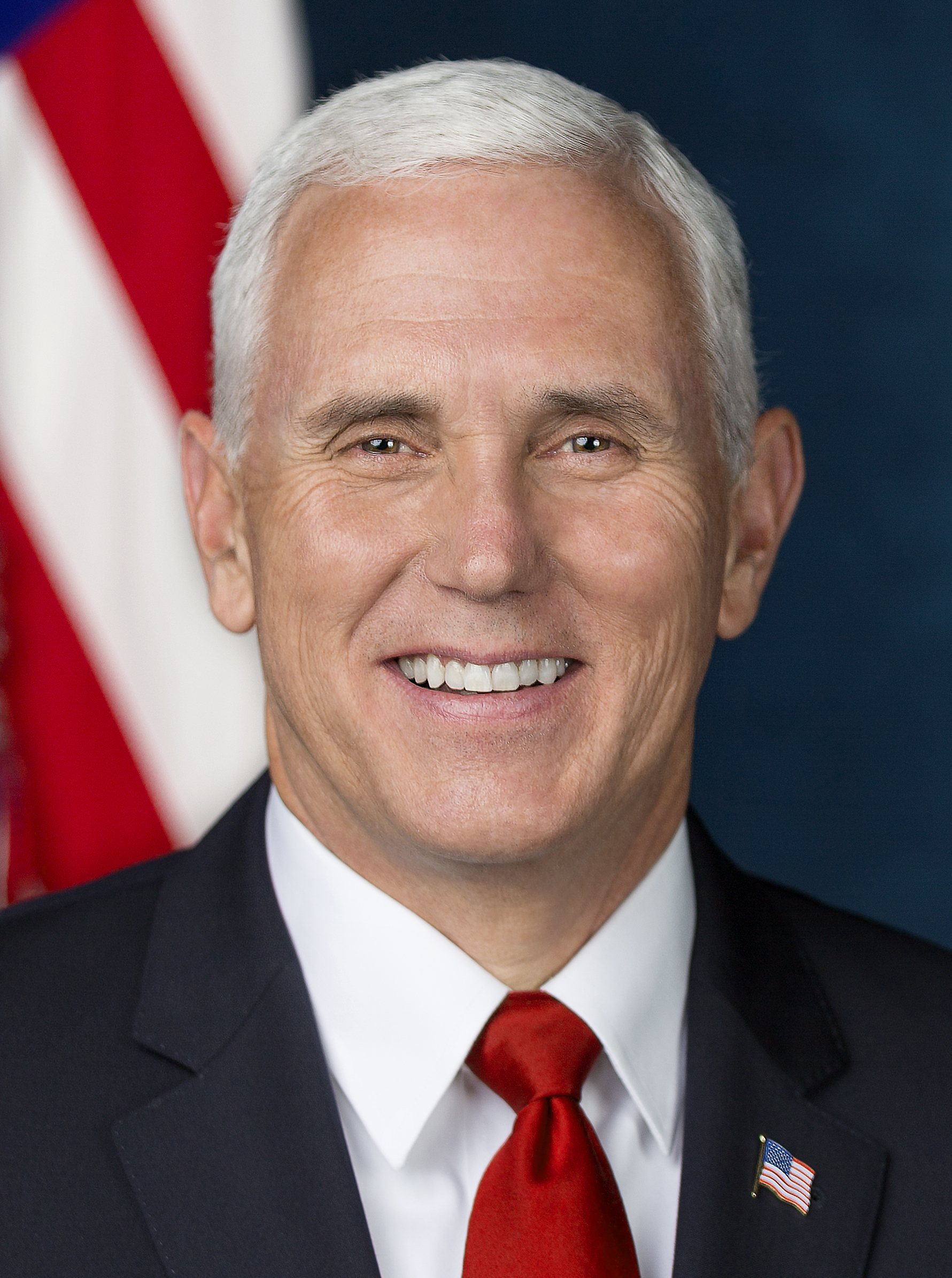
Nominee	Mike Pence
Home state	Indiana
Previous Vice Presidential nominee
Paul Ryan
Vice Presidential nominee
Mike Pence

Businessman Donald Trump of New York, the 2016 Republican nominee for President of the United States, considered several prominent Republicans and other individuals before selecting Governor Mike Pence of Indiana as his running mate on July 15, 2016. Pence formally won the vice presidential nomination at the 2016 Republican National Convention on July 19. The Trump–Pence ticket would go on to defeat the Clinton–Kaine ticket in the 2016 presidential election, but ultimately lost to the Biden–Harris ticket in 2020.

== Vetting process and selection ==
Presumptive Republican presidential nominee Donald Trump turned his attention towards selecting a running mate after he became the presumptive nominee on May 4, 2016. Trump's rivals, Senator Ted Cruz of Texas and Governor John Kasich of Ohio, had begun their vice-presidential vetting processes by April 2016, but both dropped out of the race after the Indiana primary. Cruz had selected businesswoman Carly Fiorina.

The vetting process begins with a thorough examination of public records, such as speeches and campaign finance reports. This is followed by a "full vet," in which potential vice presidential nominees are asked to submit detailed tax returns and medical records, and answer extensive questionnaires. Attorney Arthur B. Culvahouse Jr. led the vetting process for the Trump campaign. Then-campaign manager Corey Lewandowski and Paul Manafort presented Trump with a list of sixteen names in mid-May, and, starting in June, the Trump campaign began vetting six individuals.

== Final selection ==
On May 10, 2016, Trump told the Associated Press that he had narrowed his list of potential running mates to "five or six people" with a background in politics, as opposed to the military or business. However, on July 6, Trump stated that "about" ten people remained in the running as potential running mate selections. In mid-June, Eli Stokols and Burgess Everett of Politico reported that Trump's shortlist included Governor Chris Christie of New Jersey, former Speaker Newt Gingrich of Georgia, Senator Jeff Sessions of Alabama, and Governor Mary Fallin of Oklahoma. A June 30 report in The Washington Post also included Senators Bob Corker of Tennessee, Richard Burr of North Carolina, Tom Cotton of Arkansas, and Joni Ernst of Iowa, as well as Governor Mike Pence of Indiana, as individuals still being considered for the ticket. The Trump campaign also strongly considered Governor John Kasich of Ohio, considering him the "perfect choice," but Kasich refused to be considered for the ticket (or endorse the Trump campaign). In early July, Corker and Ernst both declined to be considered as Trump's running mate. Meanwhile, Trump stated that he was considering two military generals for the position, including retired Lieutenant General Michael Flynn. On July 12, NBC News reported that Trump was planning to formally introduce his eventual pick on July 15, though "it's not clear whether or not the identity of the pick could be released or could leak earlier in the week." The same article reported that he had narrowed his list to Christie, Gingrich, and Pence.

=== Shortlist ===
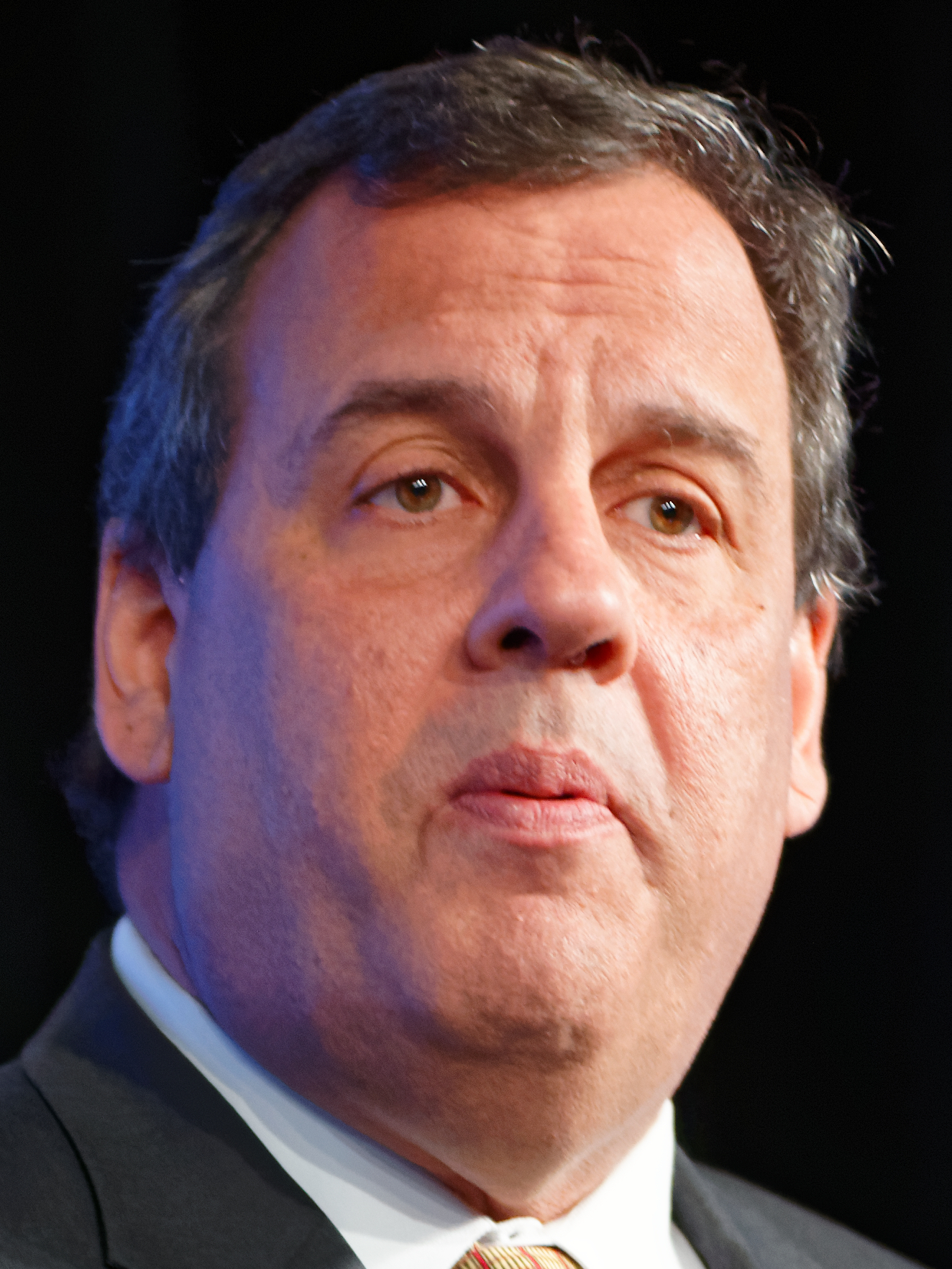
Governor and 2016 presidential candidate
Chris Christie
of New Jersey
(2010–2018)

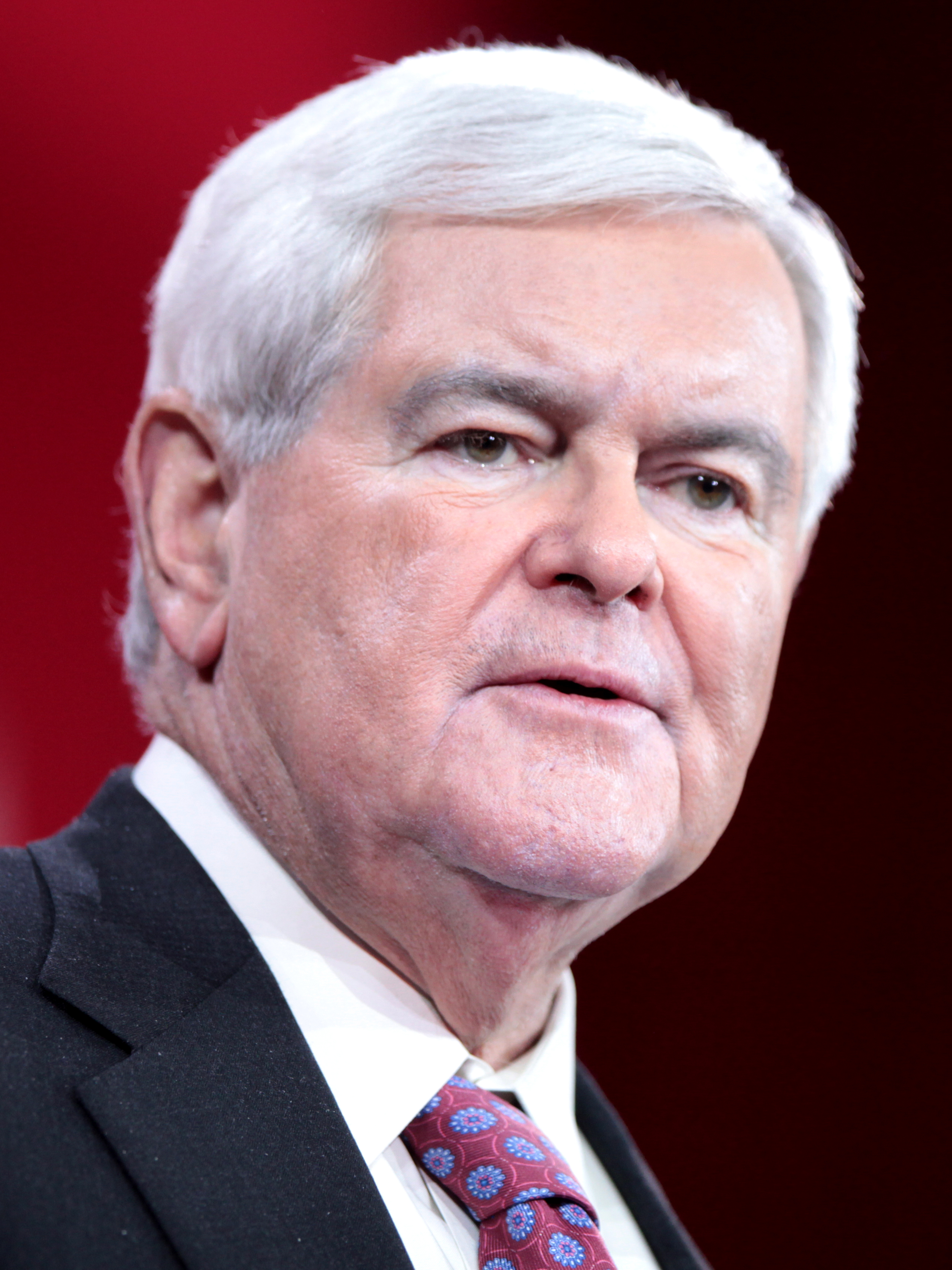
Former Speaker of the House of Representatives
Newt Gingrich
from Georgia
(1995–1999)

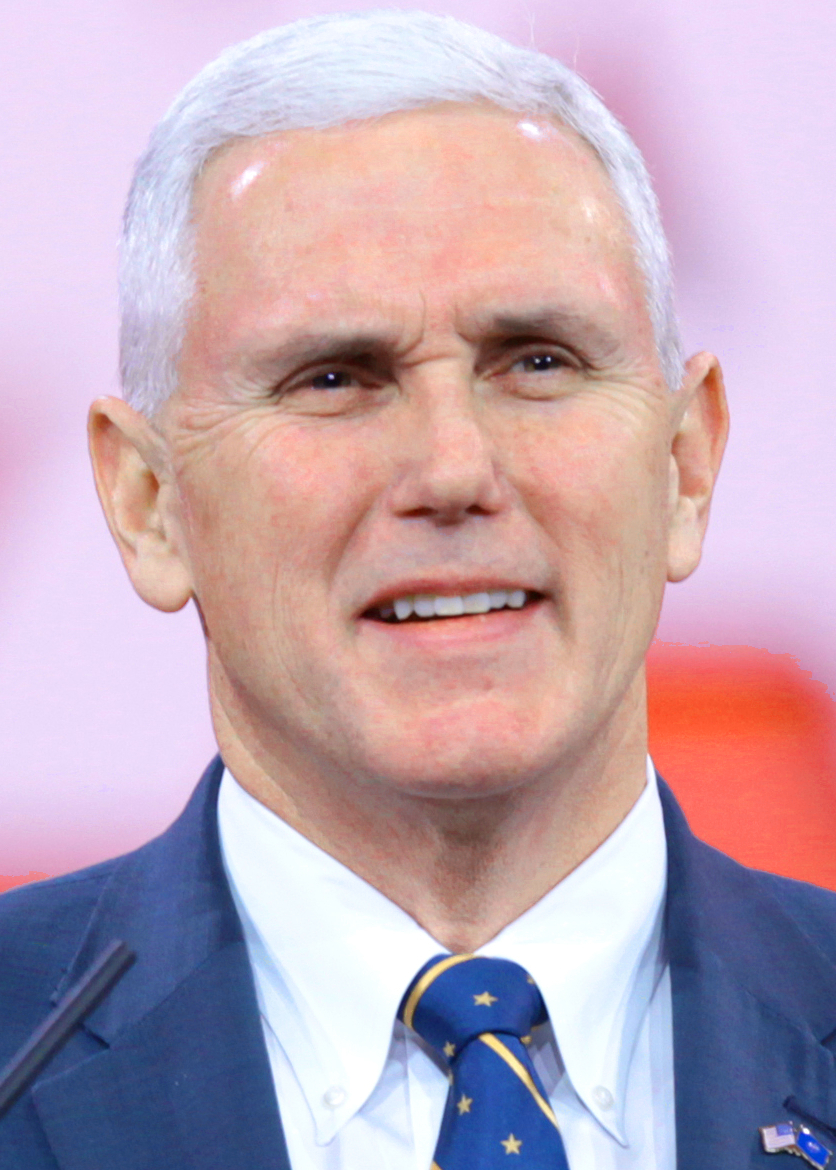
Governor
Mike Pence
of Indiana
(2013–2017)

== Media speculation on possible selections ==
=== Members of Congress ===
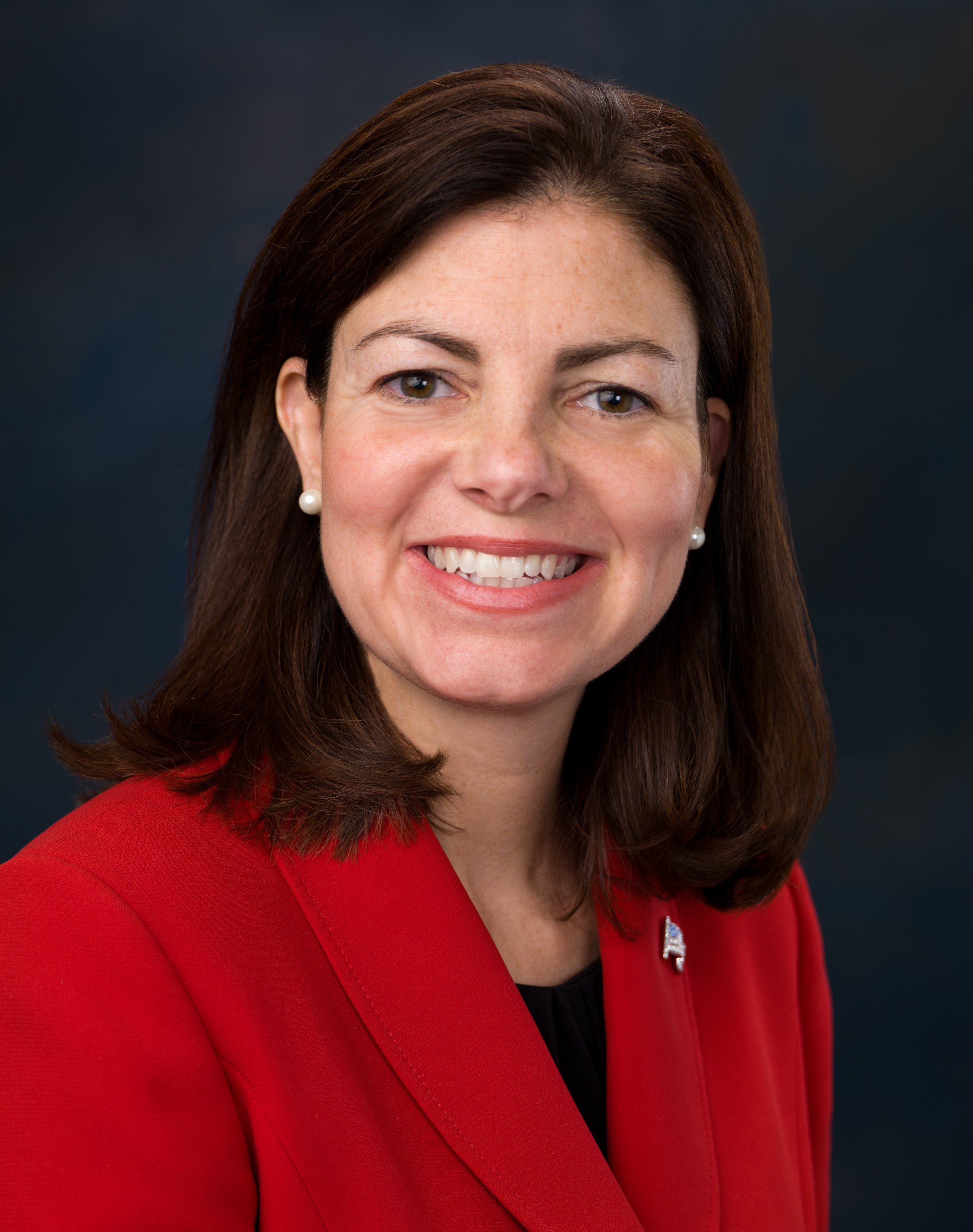
Senator
Kelly Ayotte
from New Hampshire

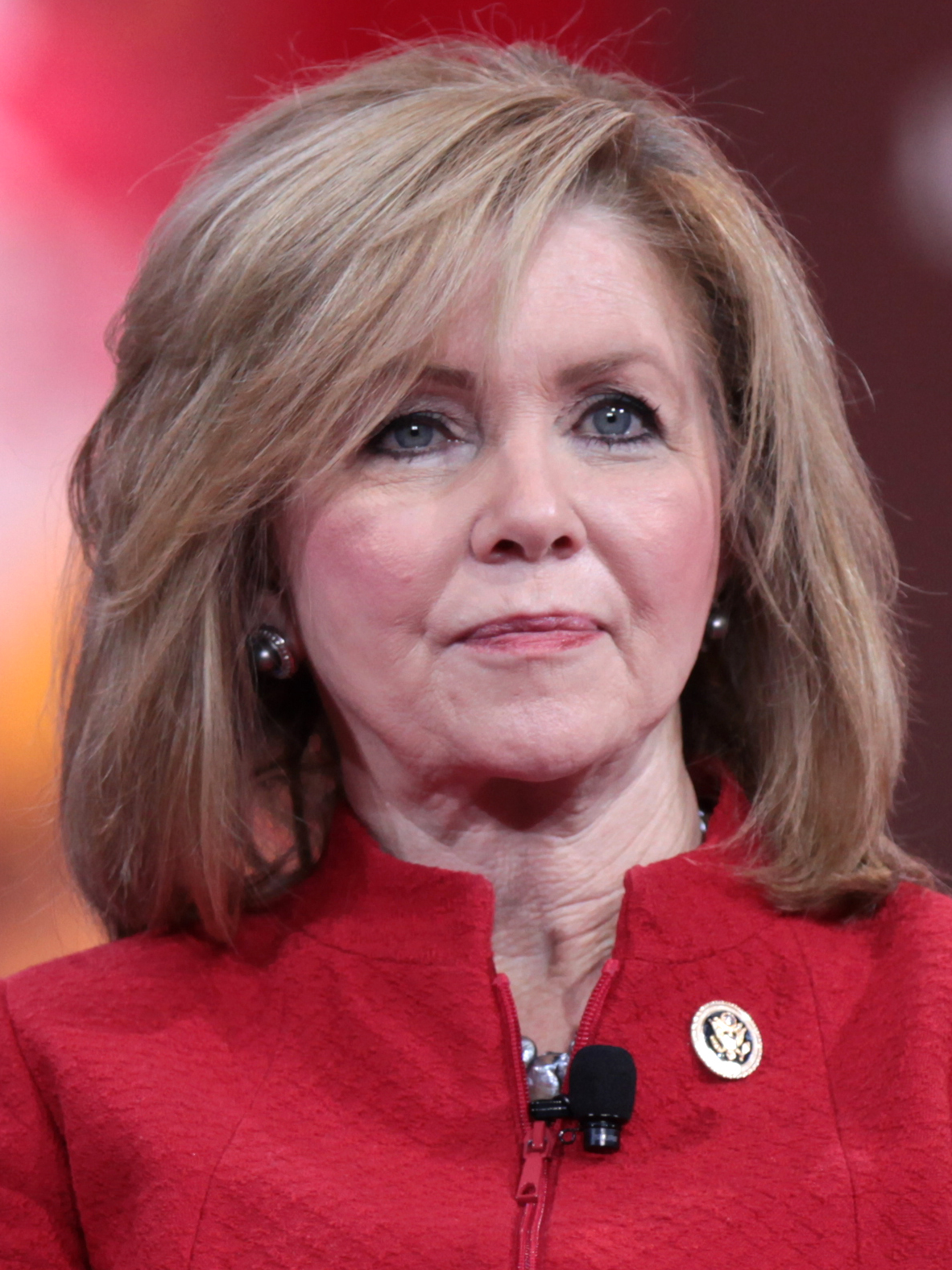
Representative
Marsha Blackburn
from Tennessee

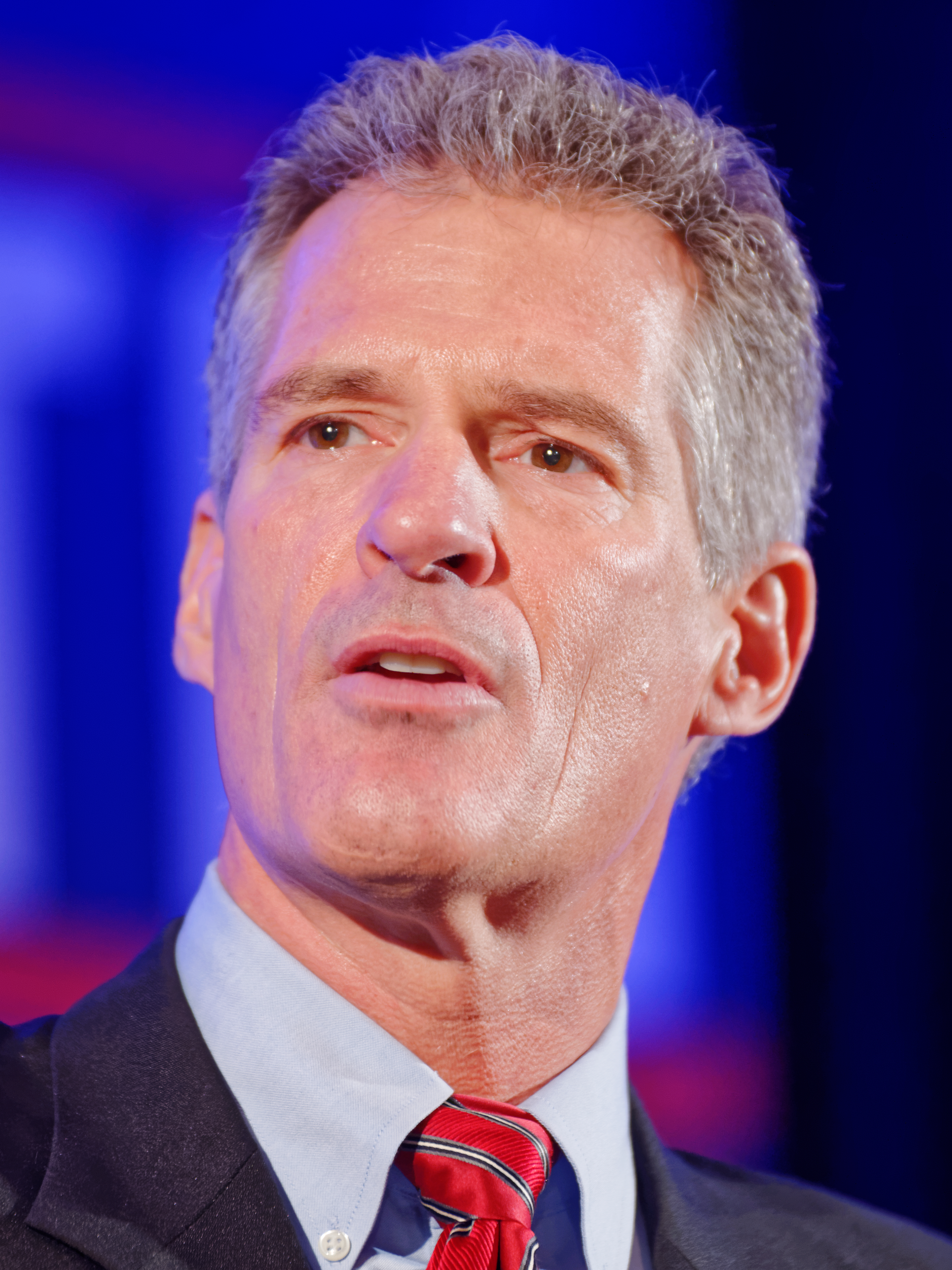
Former Senator
Scott Brown
from Massachusetts

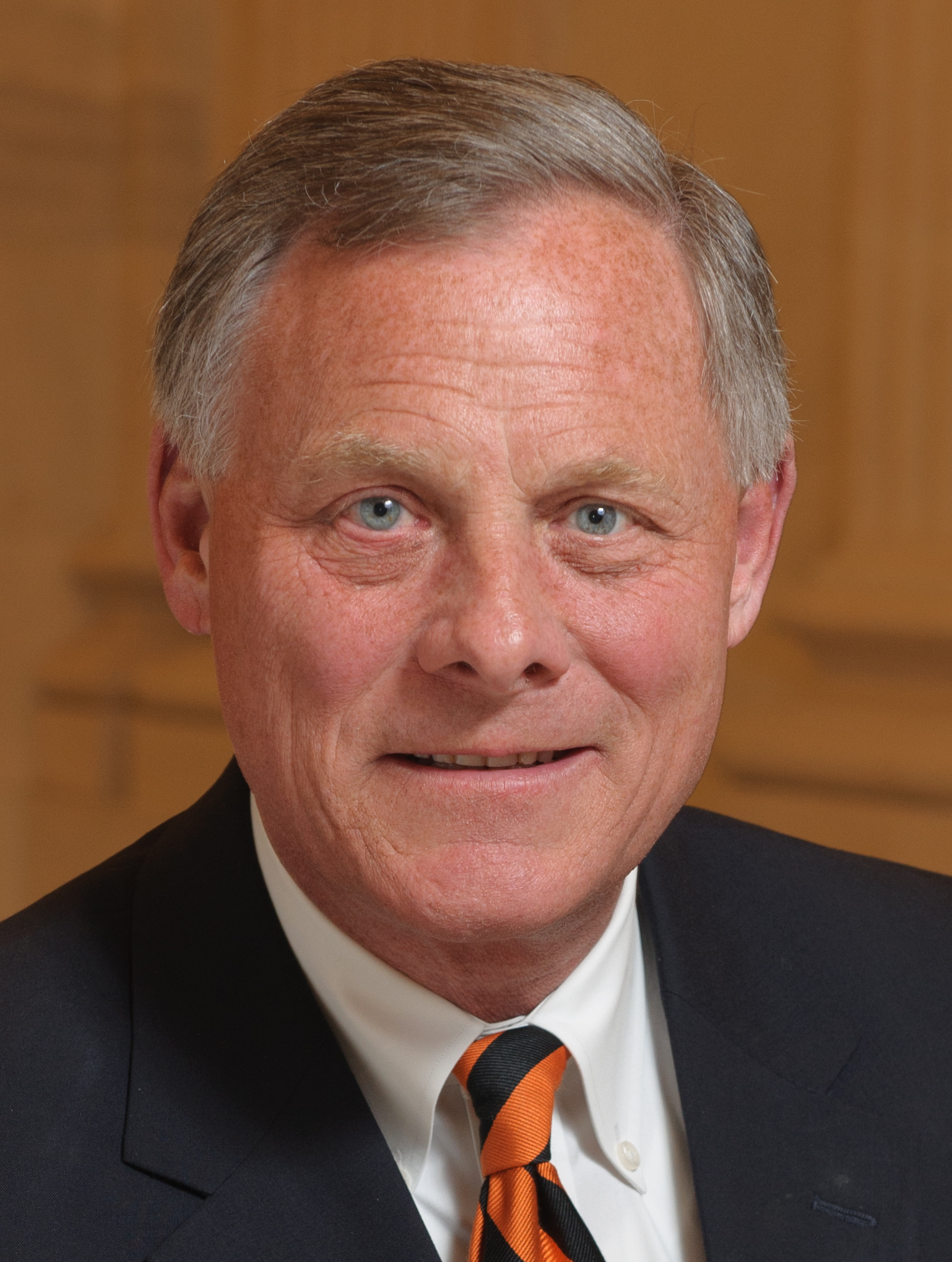
Senator
Richard Burr
from North Carolina

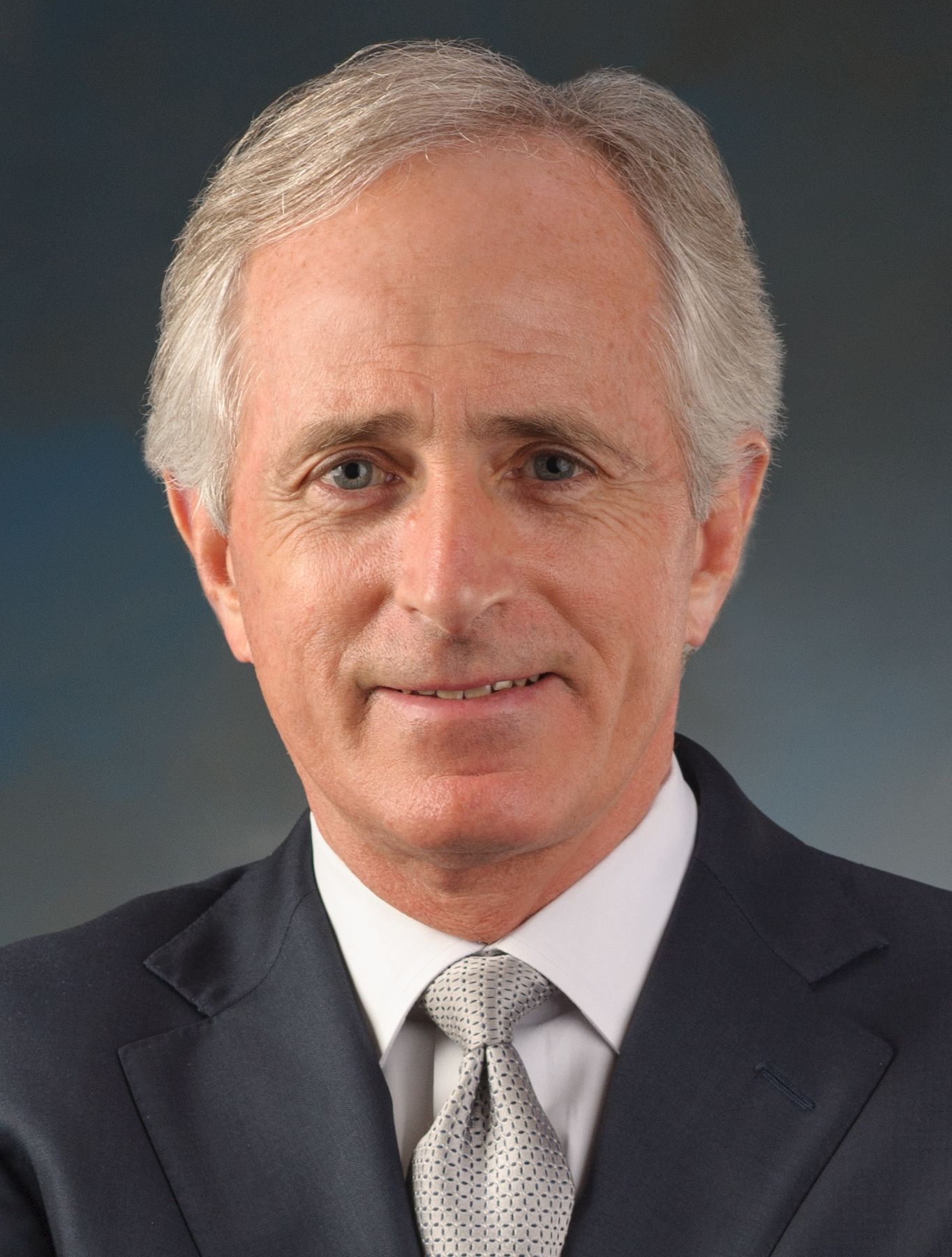
Senator
Bob Corker
from Tennessee

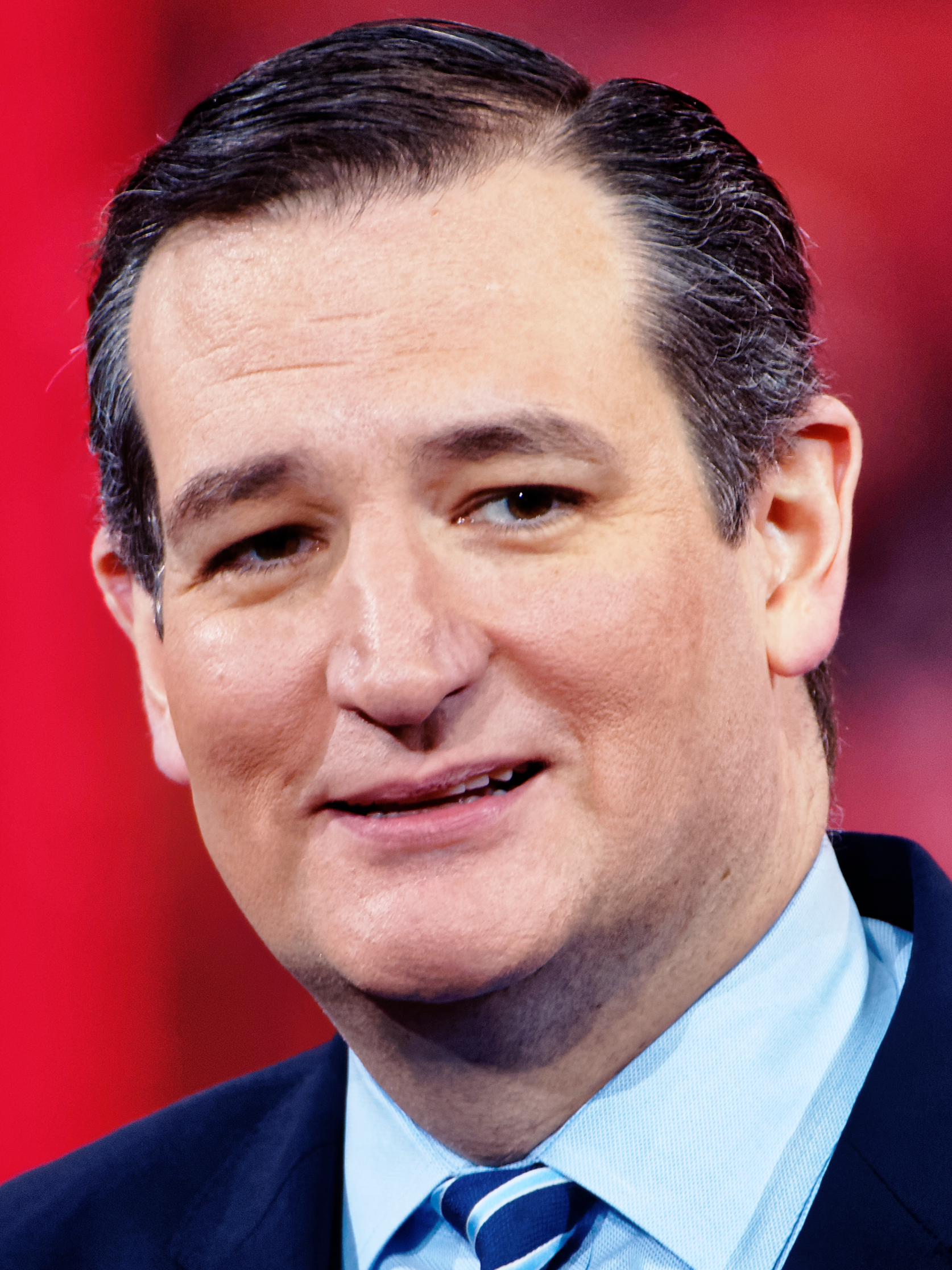
Senator
Ted Cruz
from Texas a 2016 presidential candidate

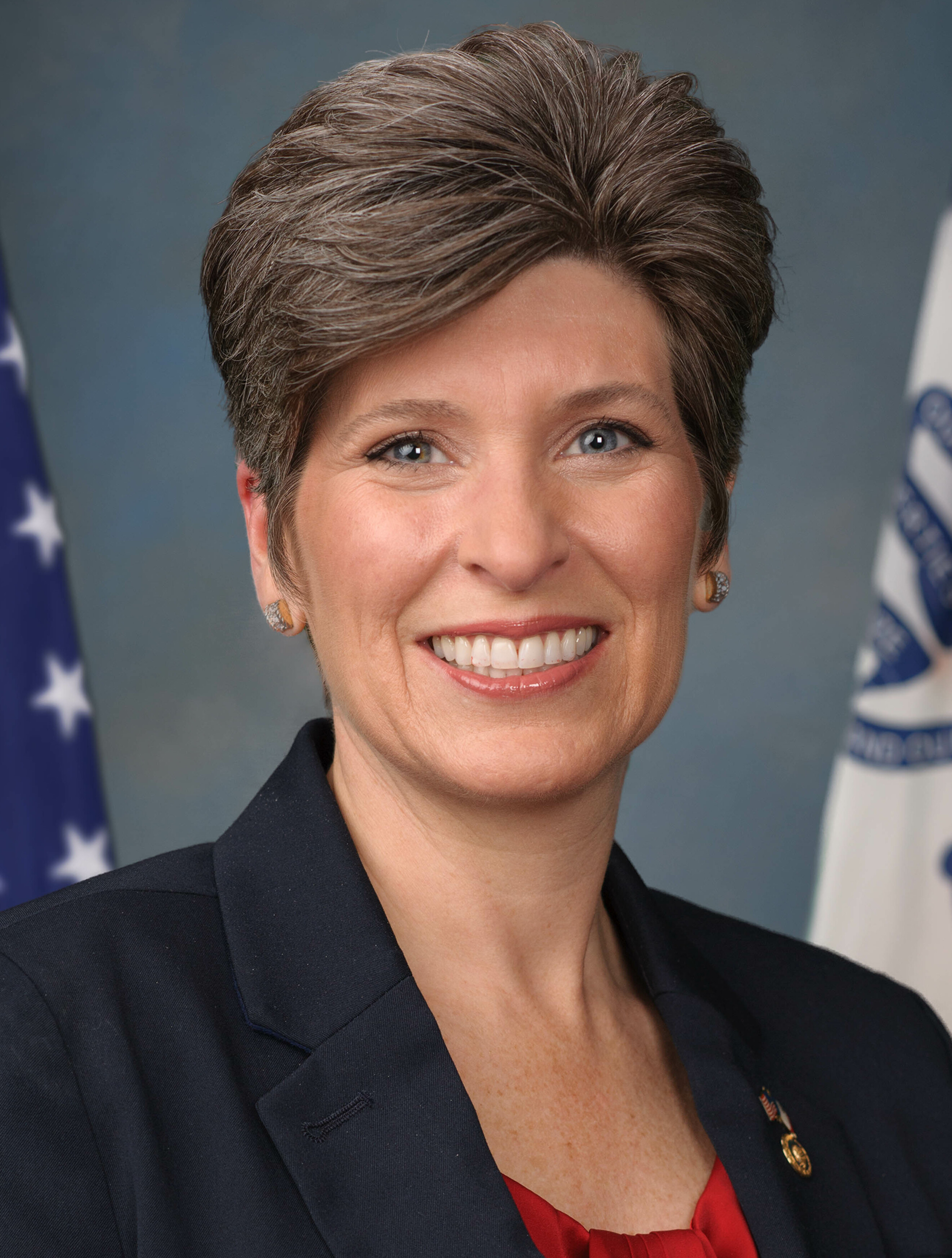
Senator
Joni Ernst
from Iowa

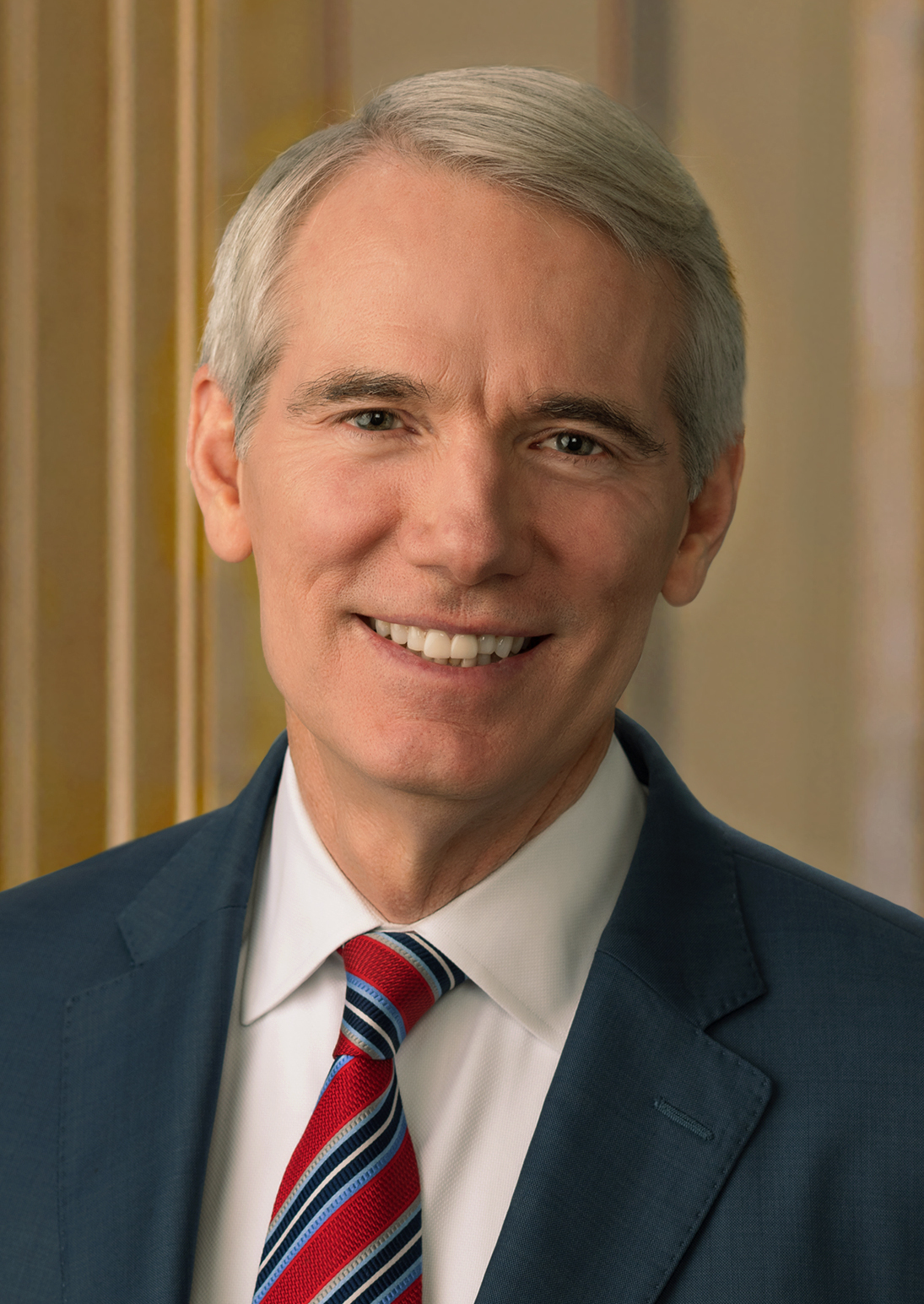
Senator
Rob Portman
from Ohio

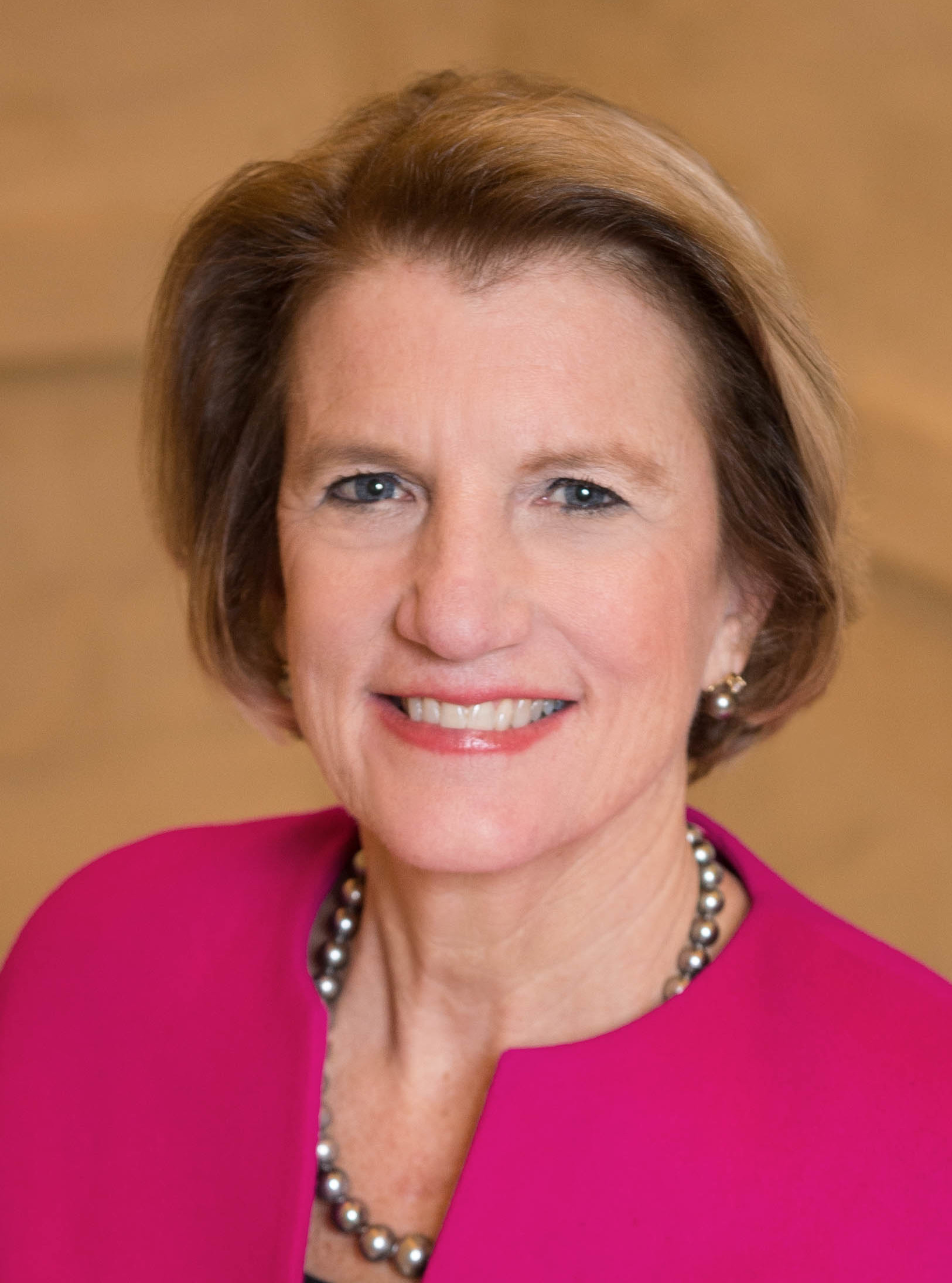
Senator
Shelley Moore Capito
from West Virginia

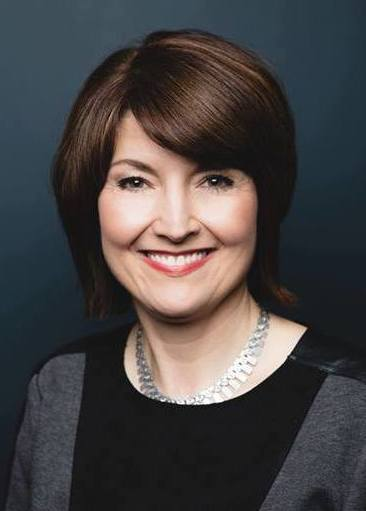
Representative
Cathy McMorris Rodgers
from Washington

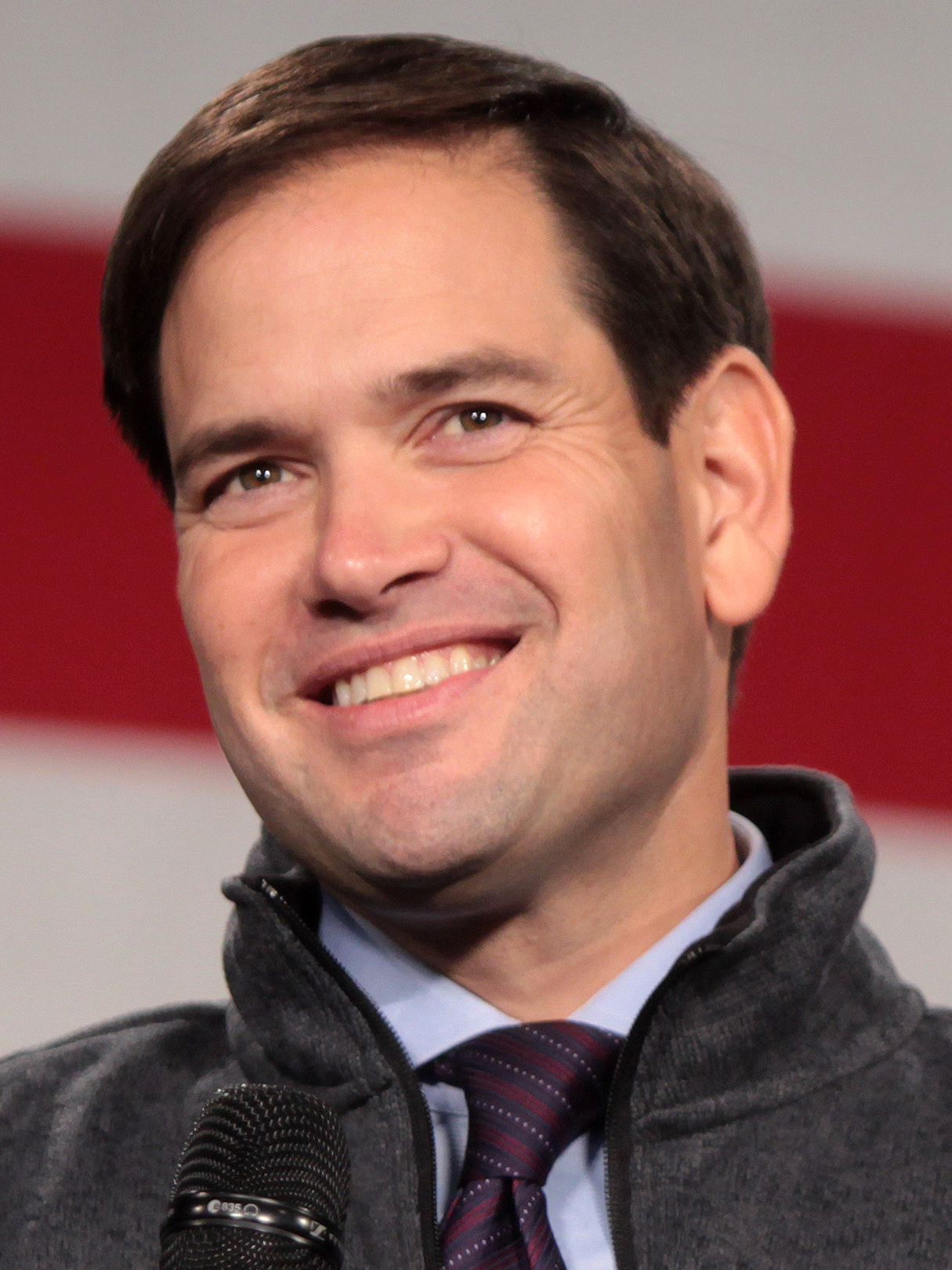
Senator
Marco Rubio
from Florida a 2016 presidential candidate

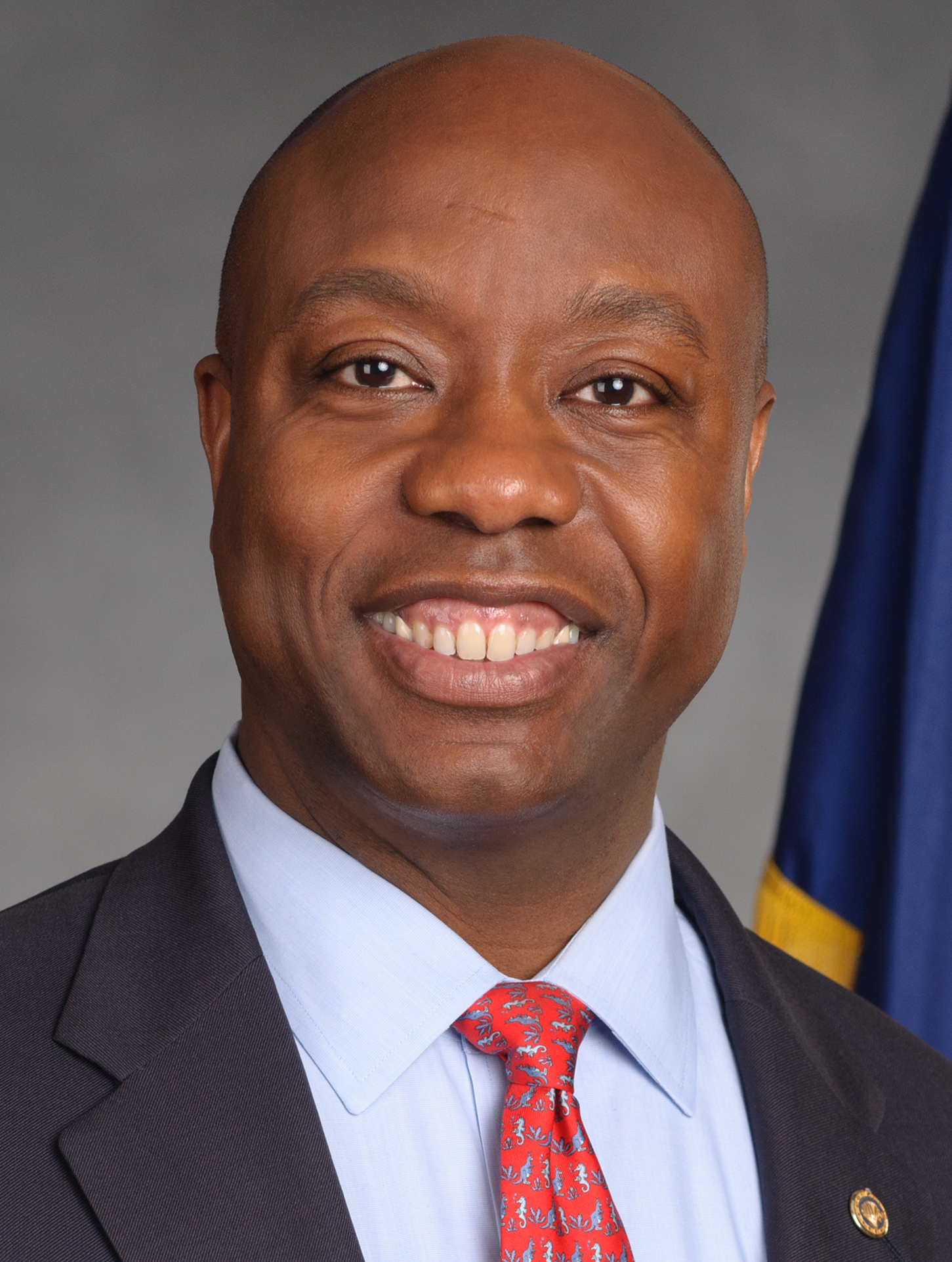
Senator
Tim Scott
from South Carolina

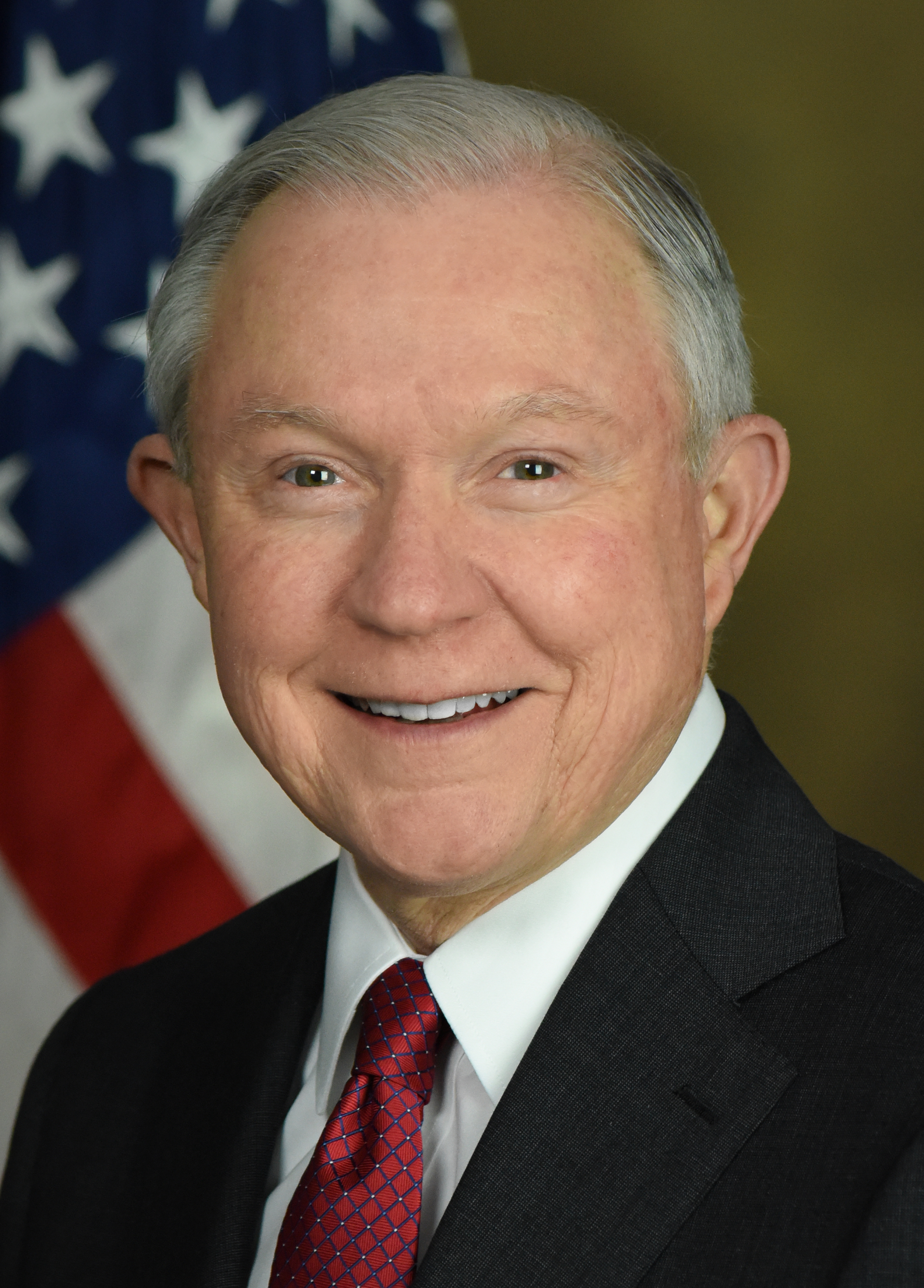
Senator
Jeff Sessions
from Alabama

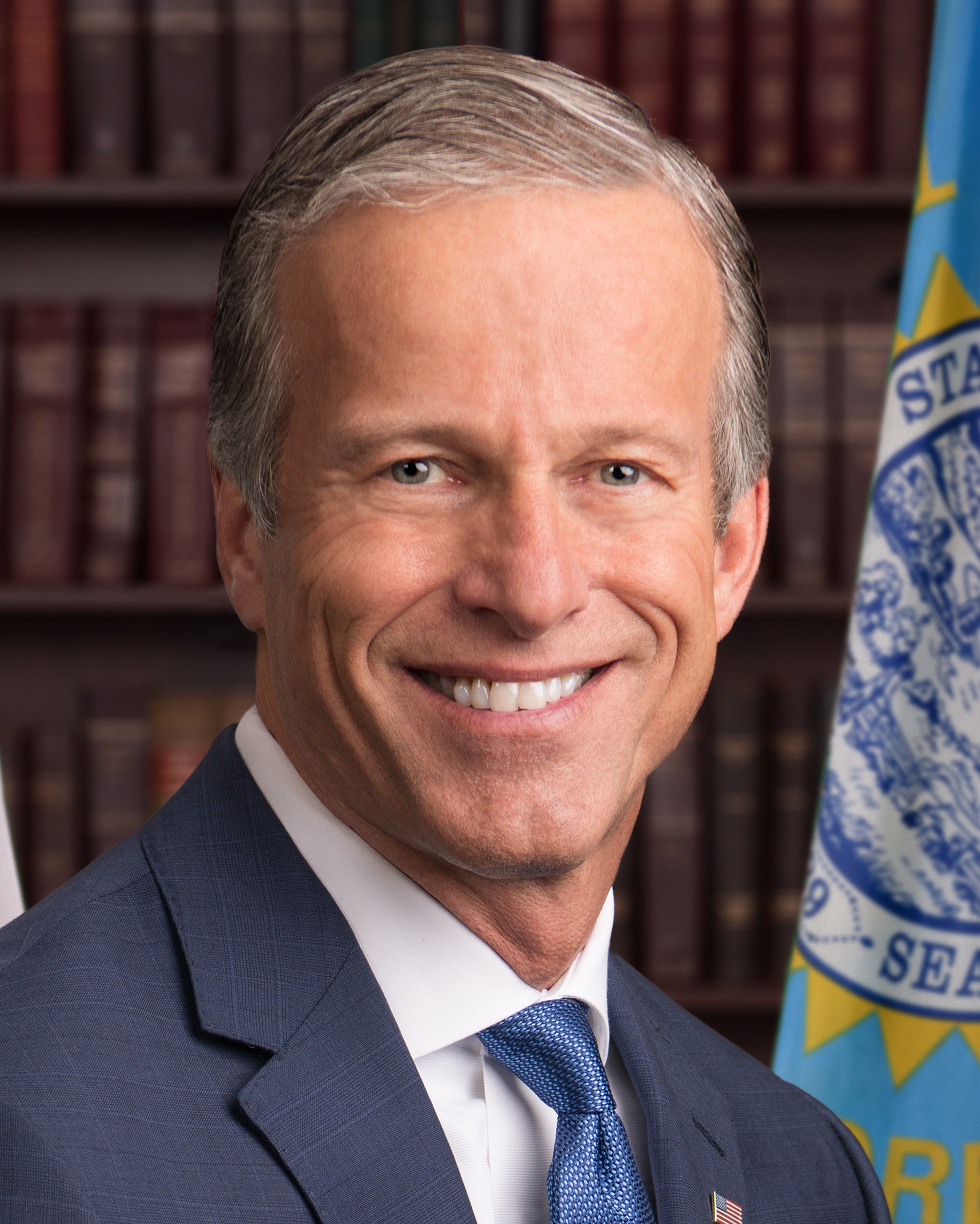
Senator
John Thune
from South Dakota

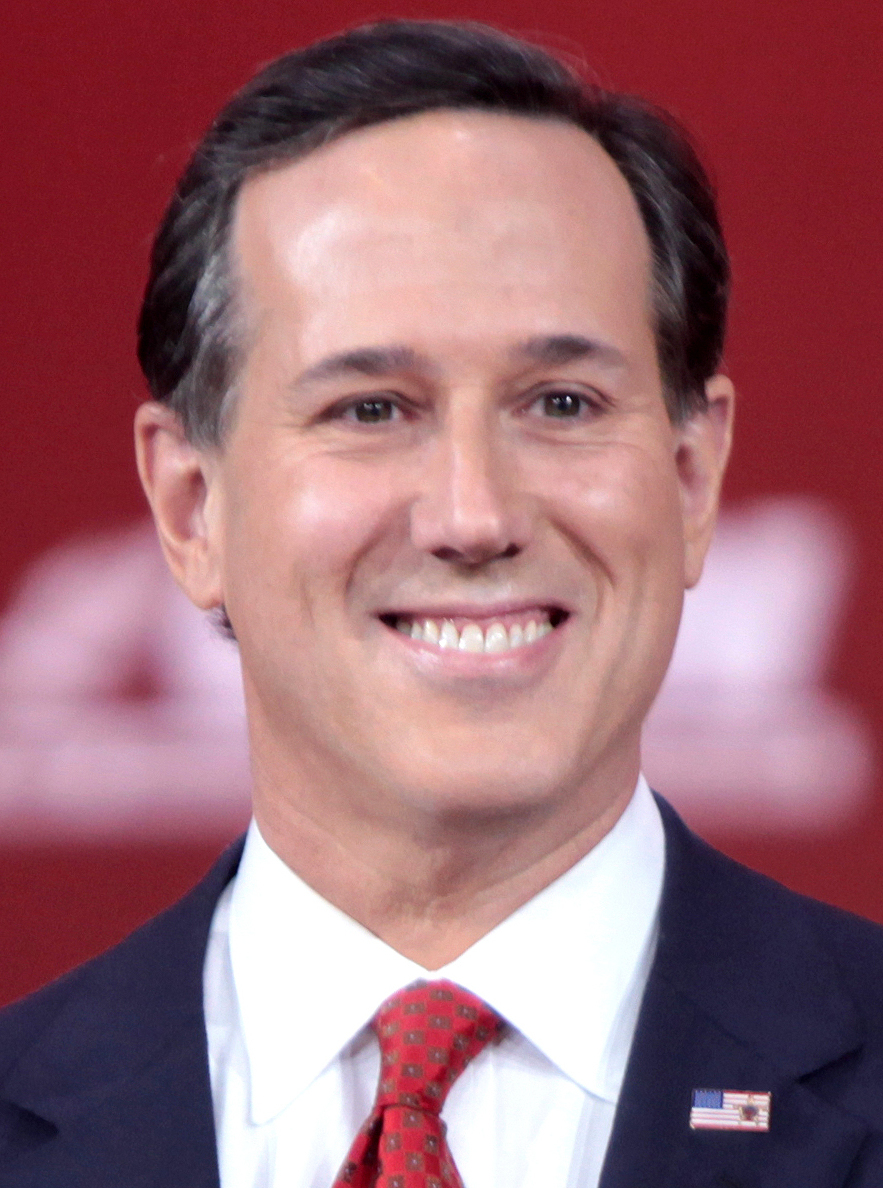
Former Senator
Rick Santorum
from Pennsylvania, a 2012 and 2016 presidential candidate

=== Governors ===
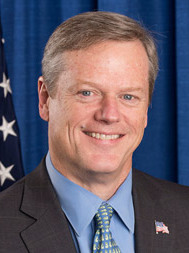
Charlie Baker
of Massachusetts

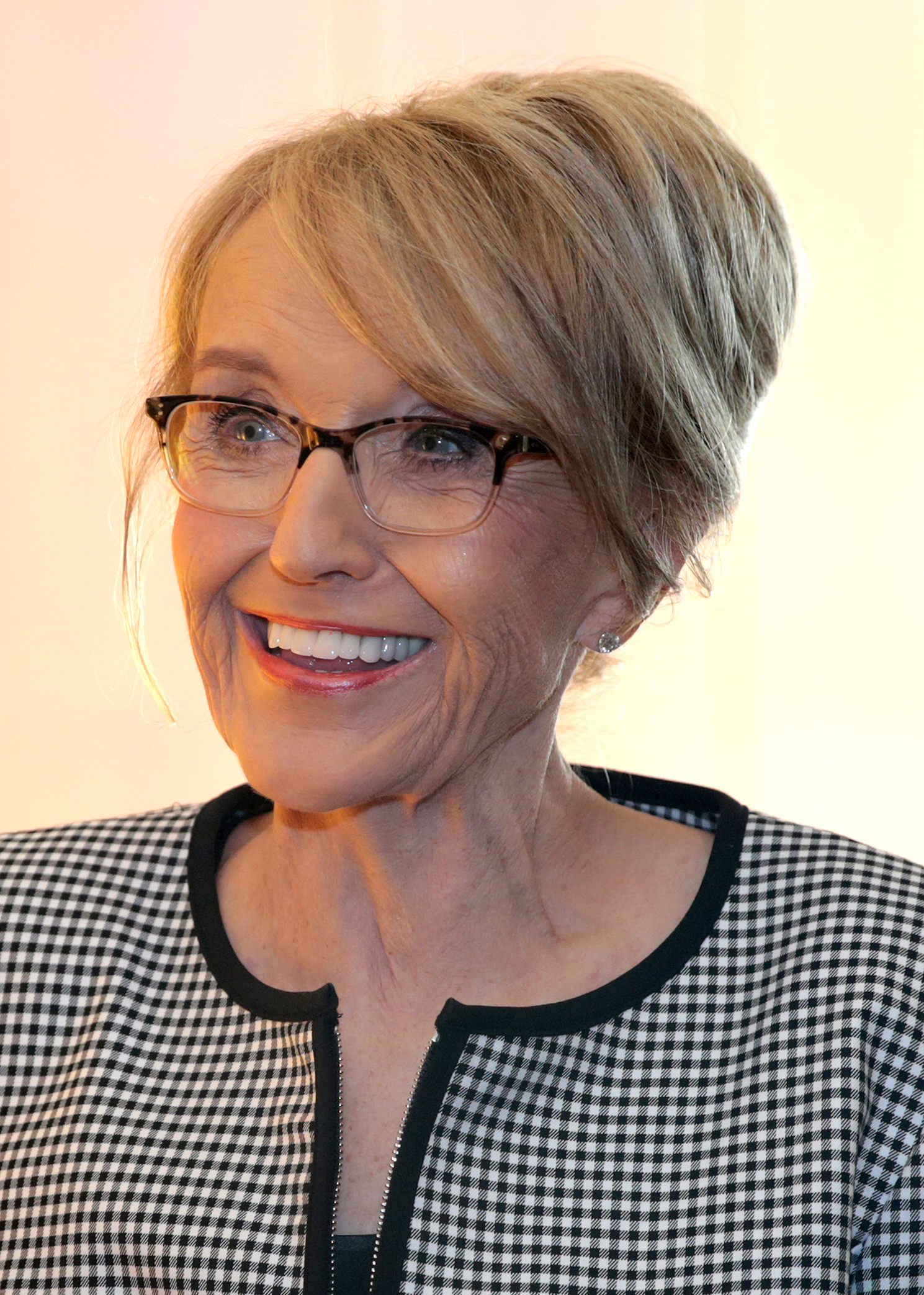
Jan Brewer
of Arizona

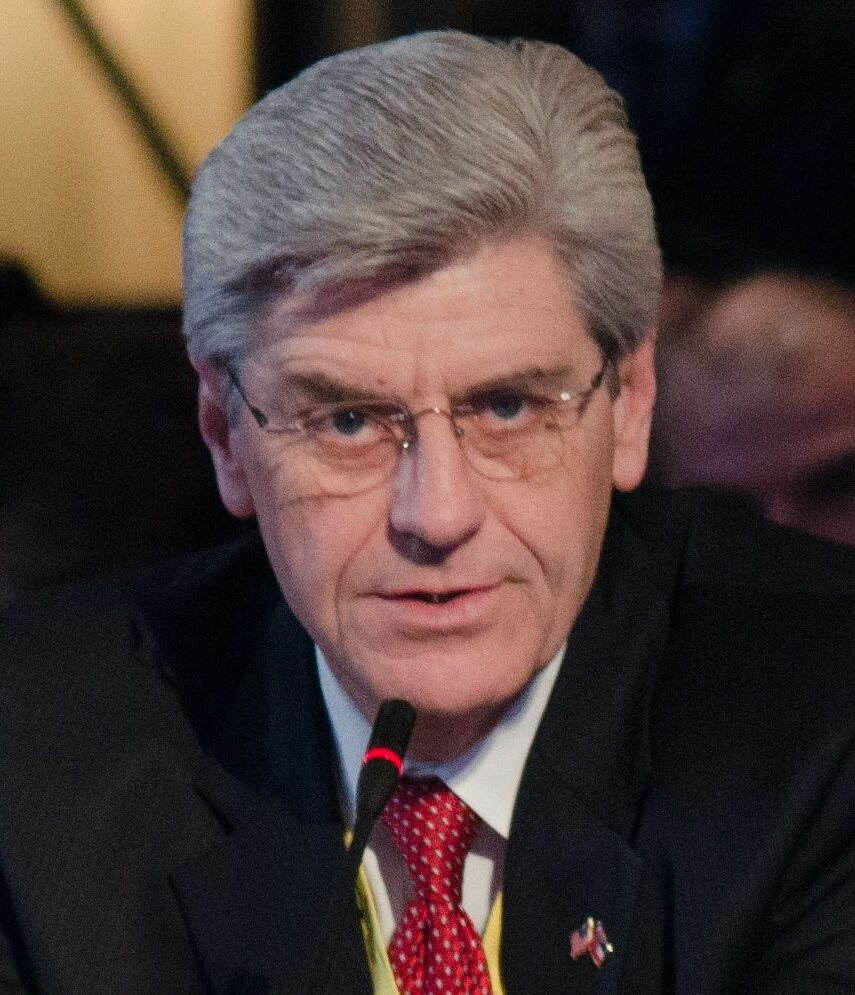
Phil Bryant
of Mississippi

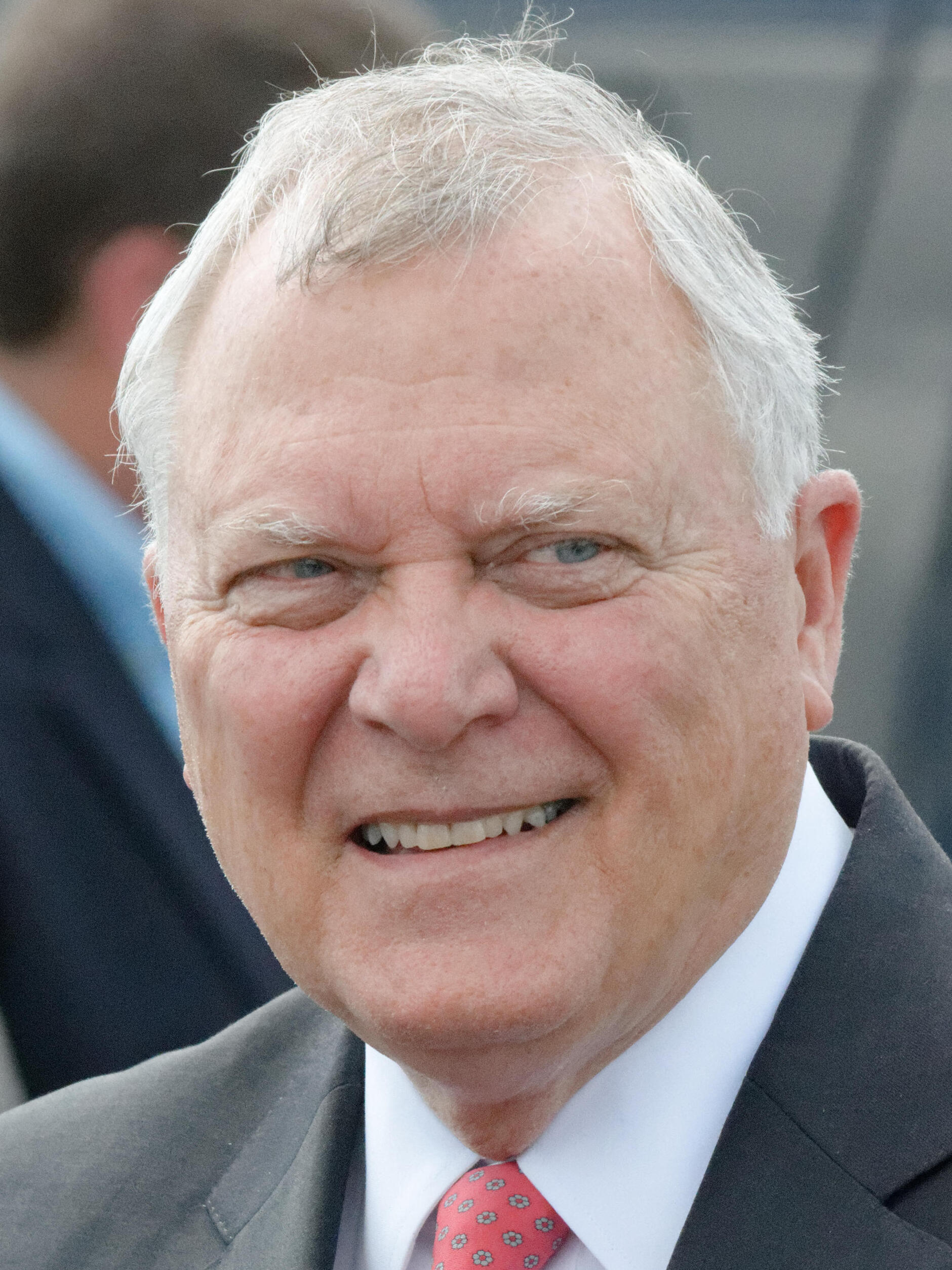
Nathan Deal
of Georgia

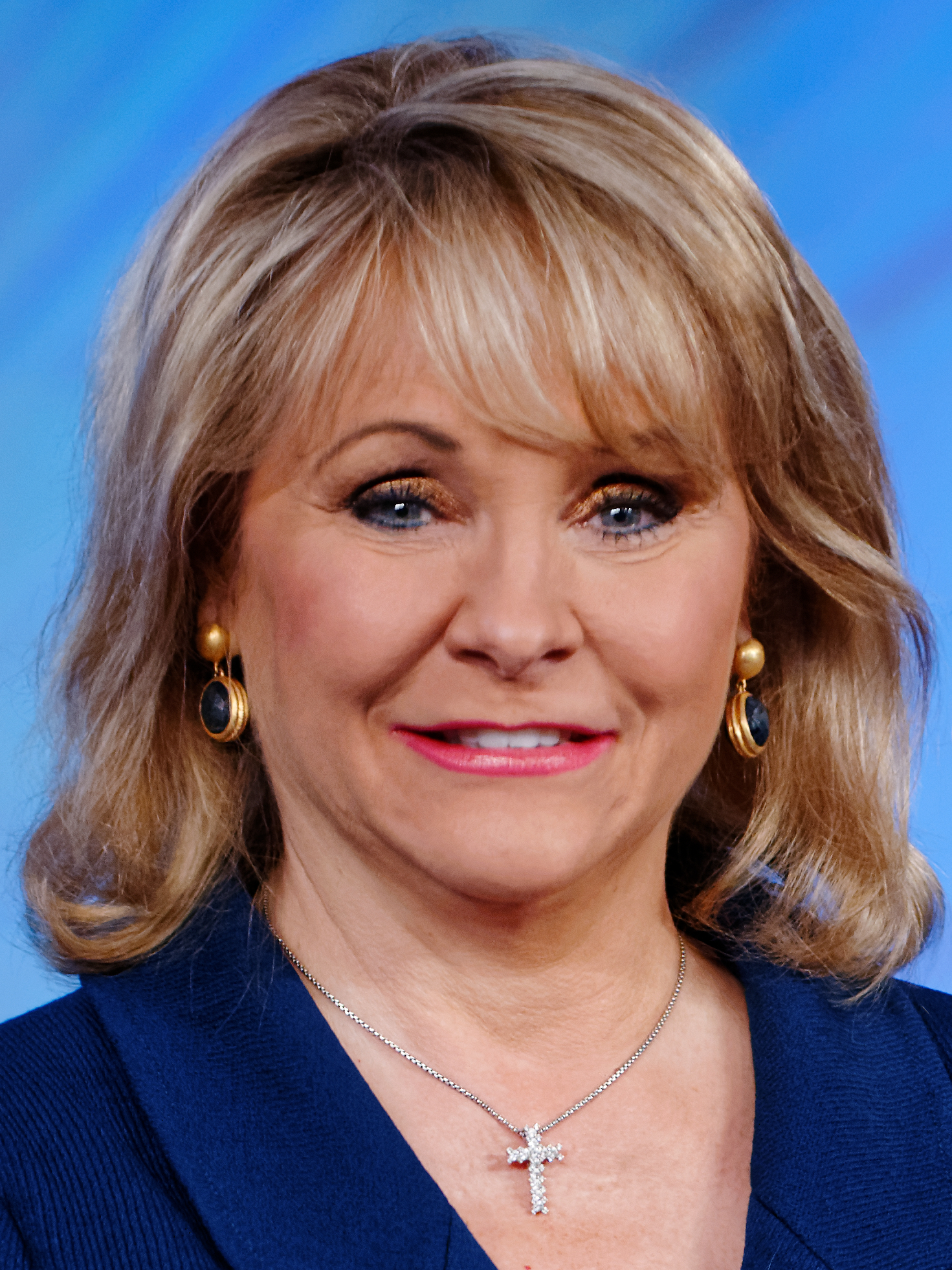
Mary Fallin
of Oklahoma

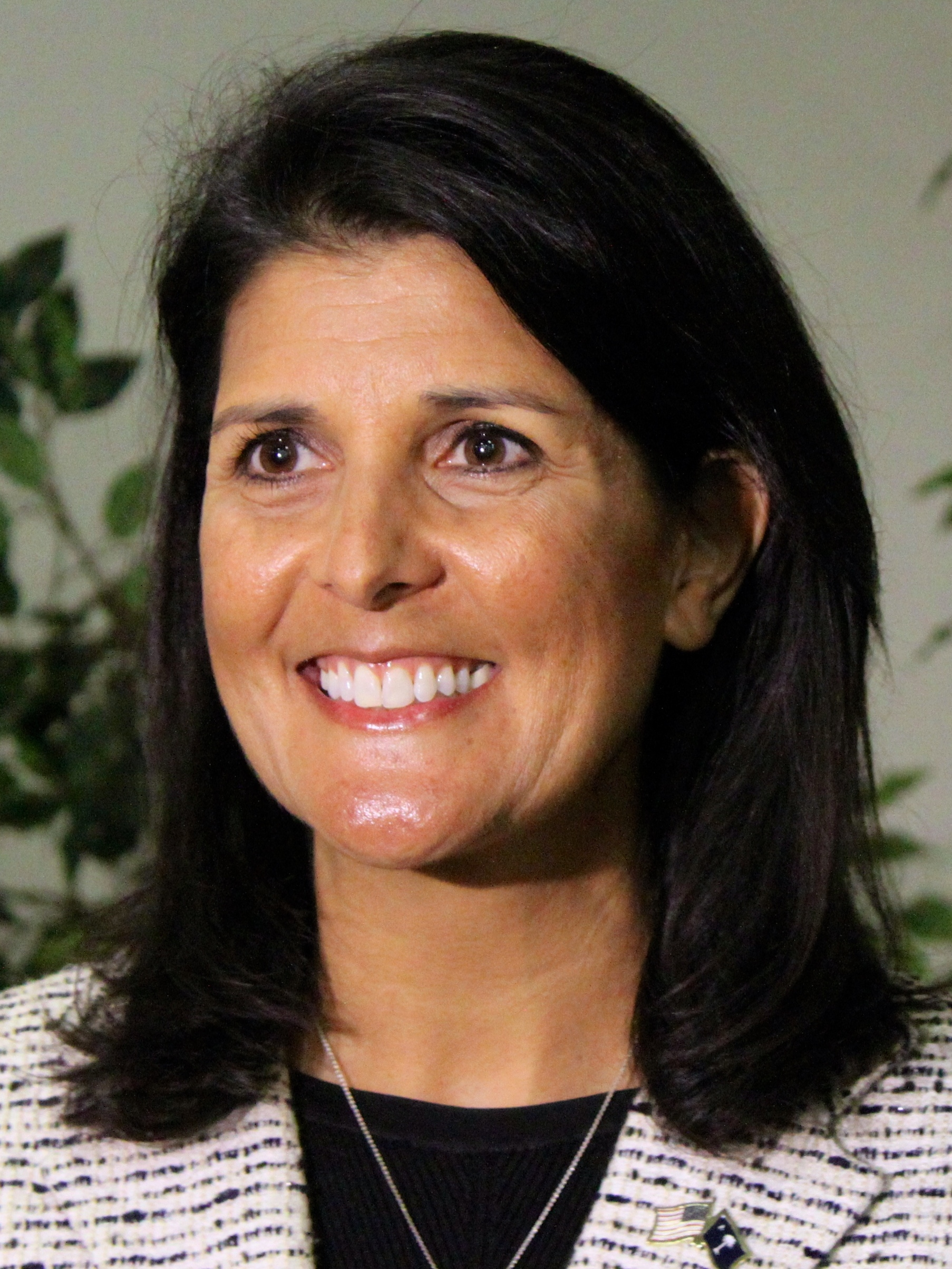
Nikki Haley
of South Carolina

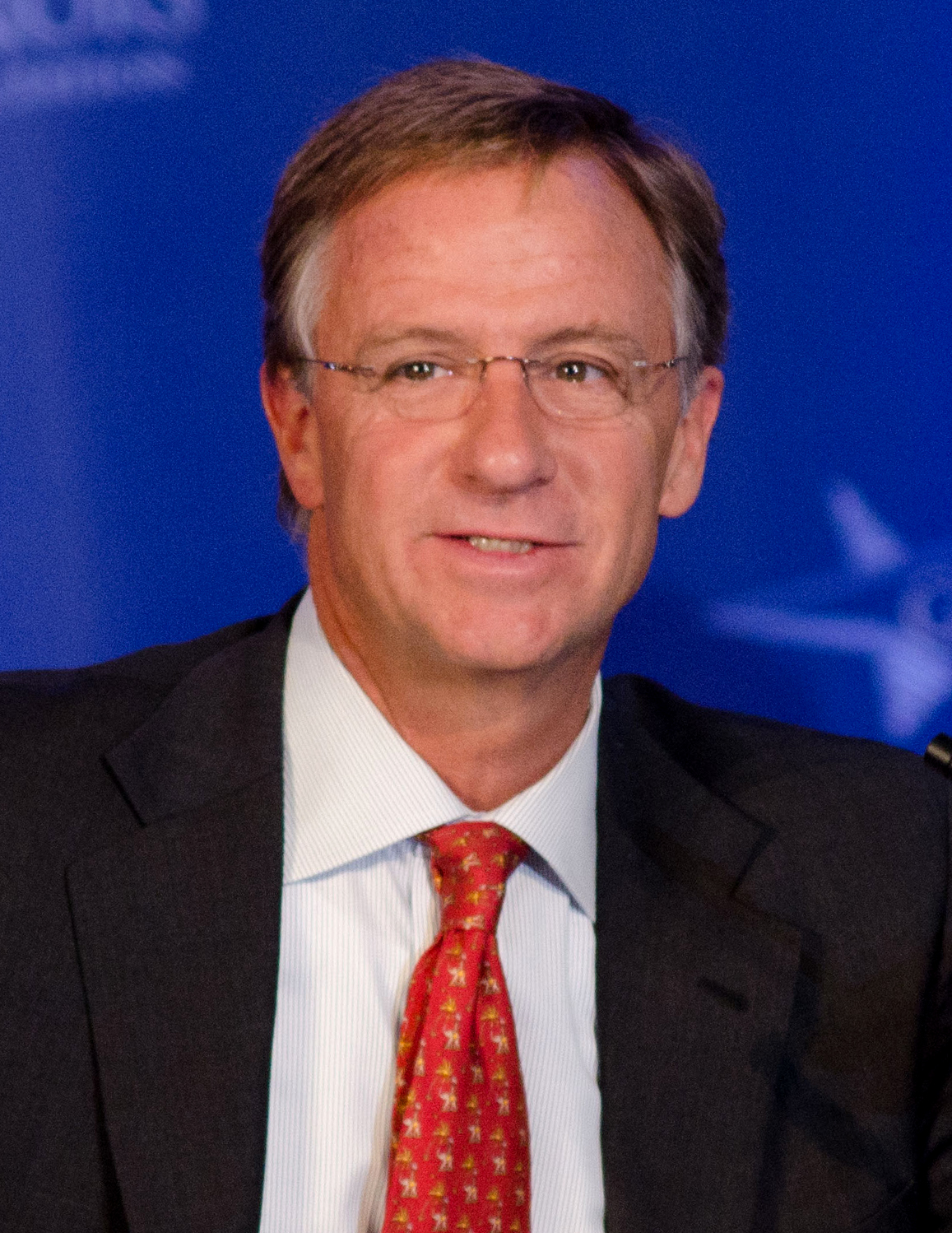
Bill Haslam
of Tennessee

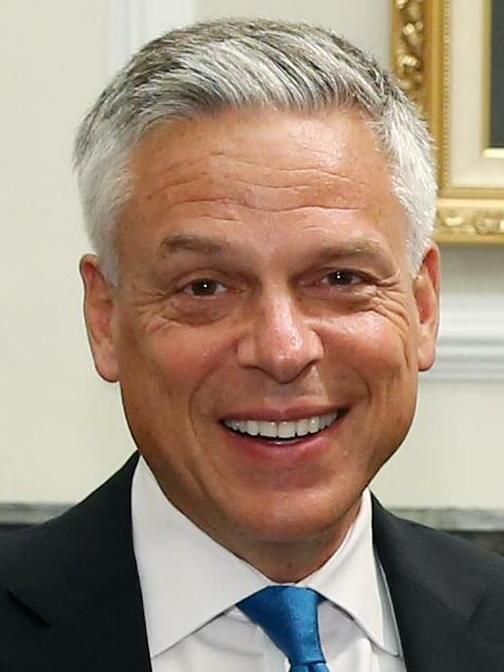
Jon Huntsman Jr.
of Utah (2005–2009), a 2012 presidential candidate

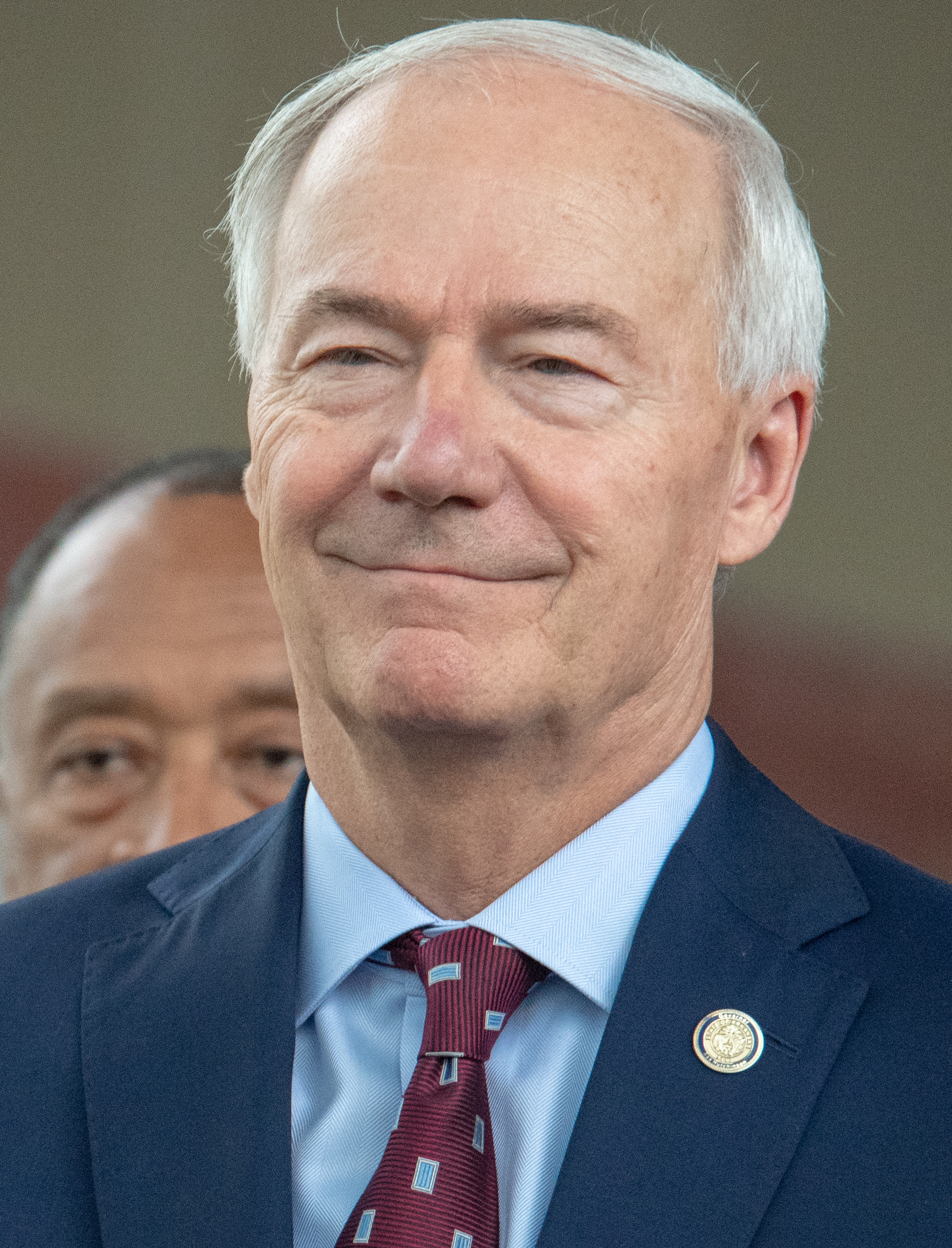
Asa Hutchinson
of Arkansas

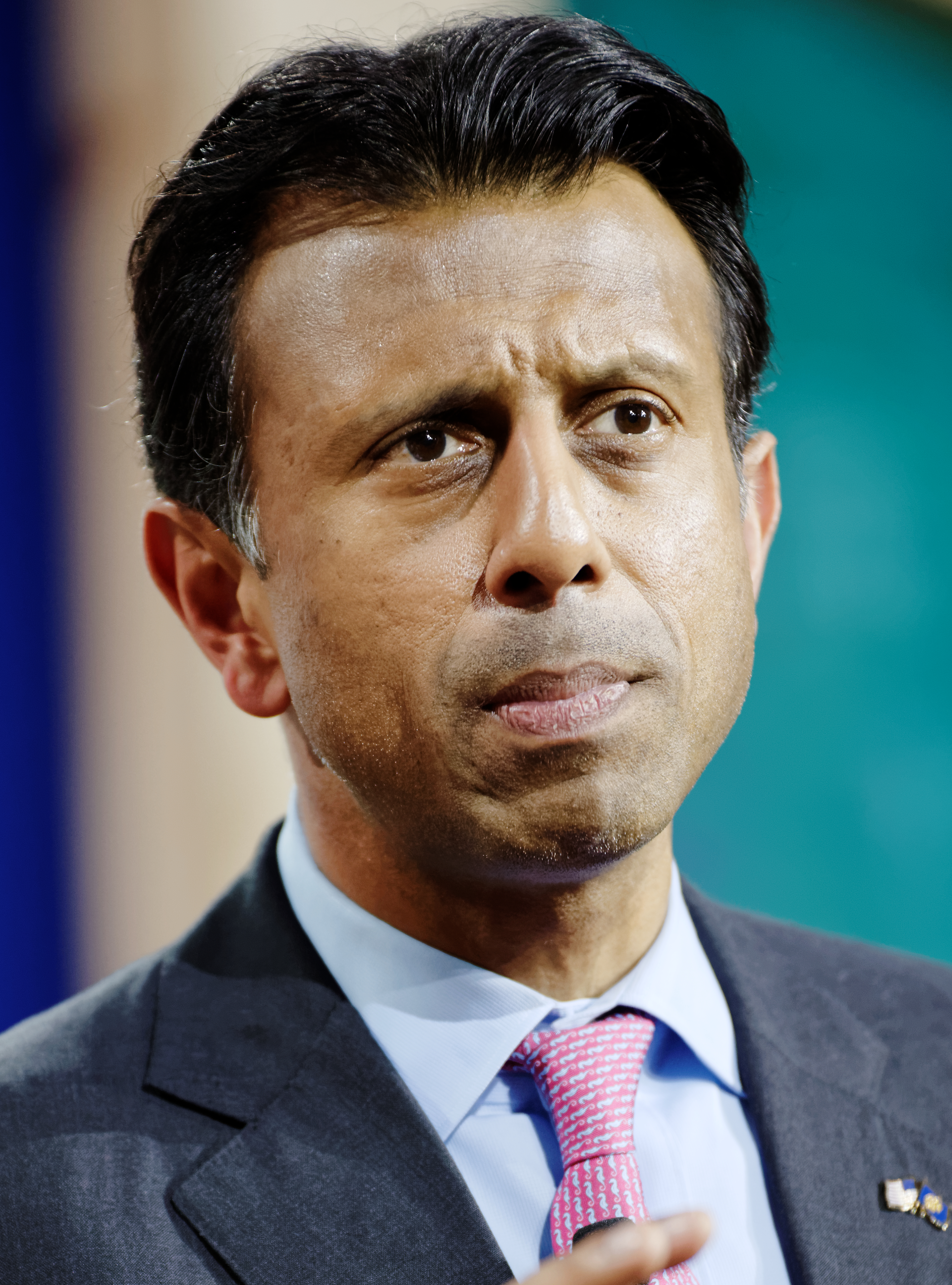
Bobby Jindal
of Louisiana (2008–2016), a 2016 presidential candidate

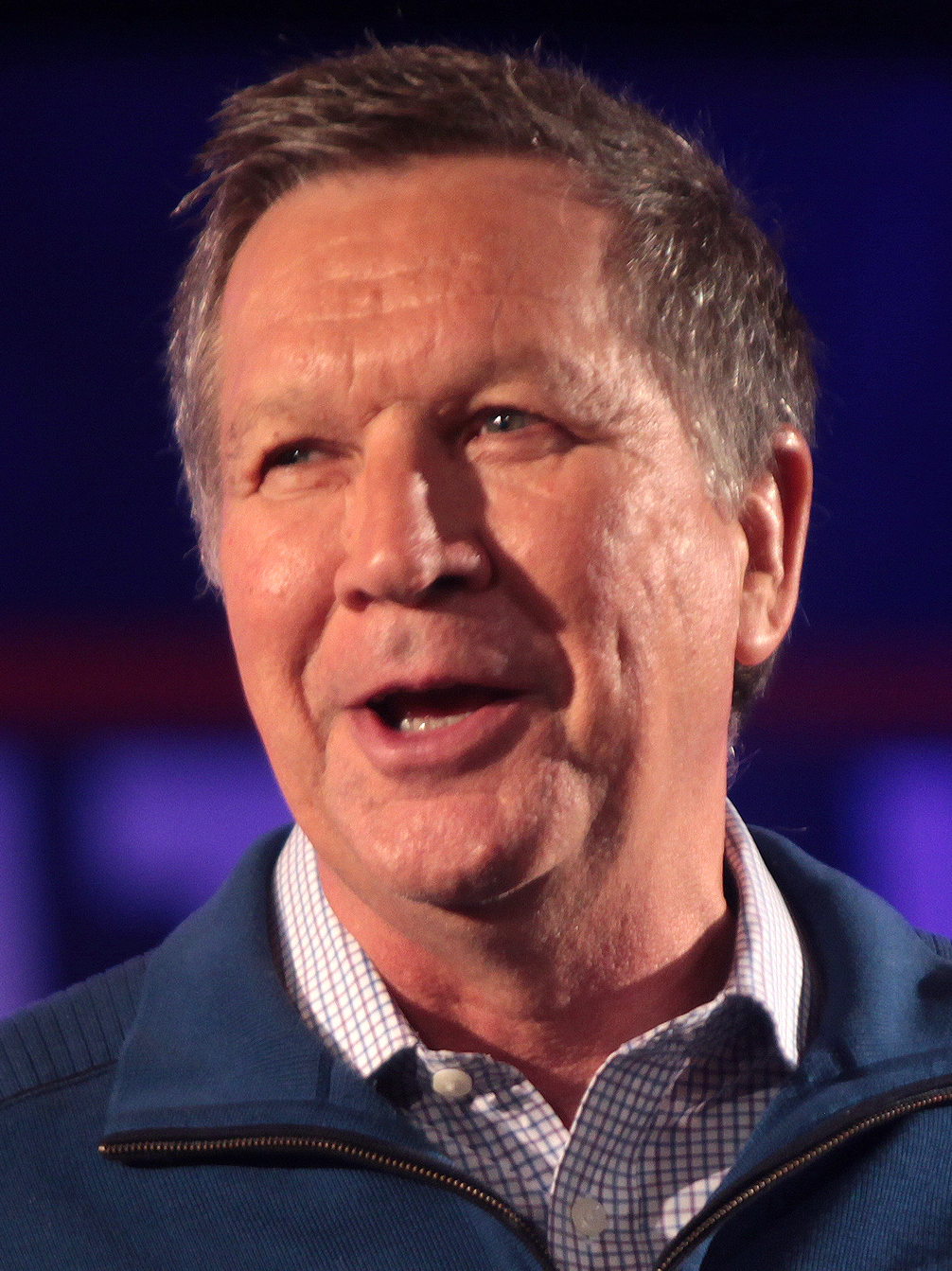
John Kasich
of Ohio, a 2000 and 2016 presidential candidate

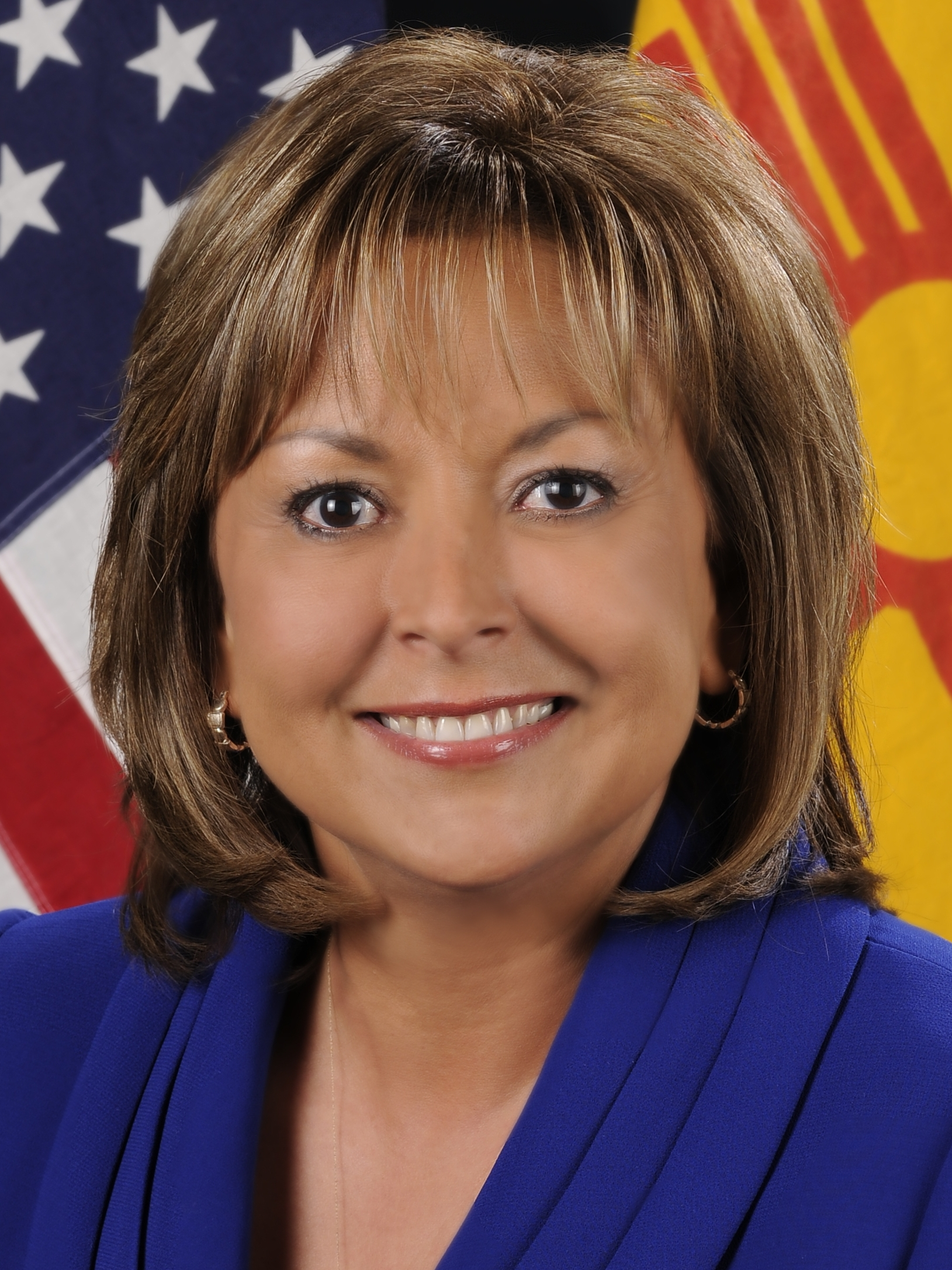
Susana Martinez
of New Mexico

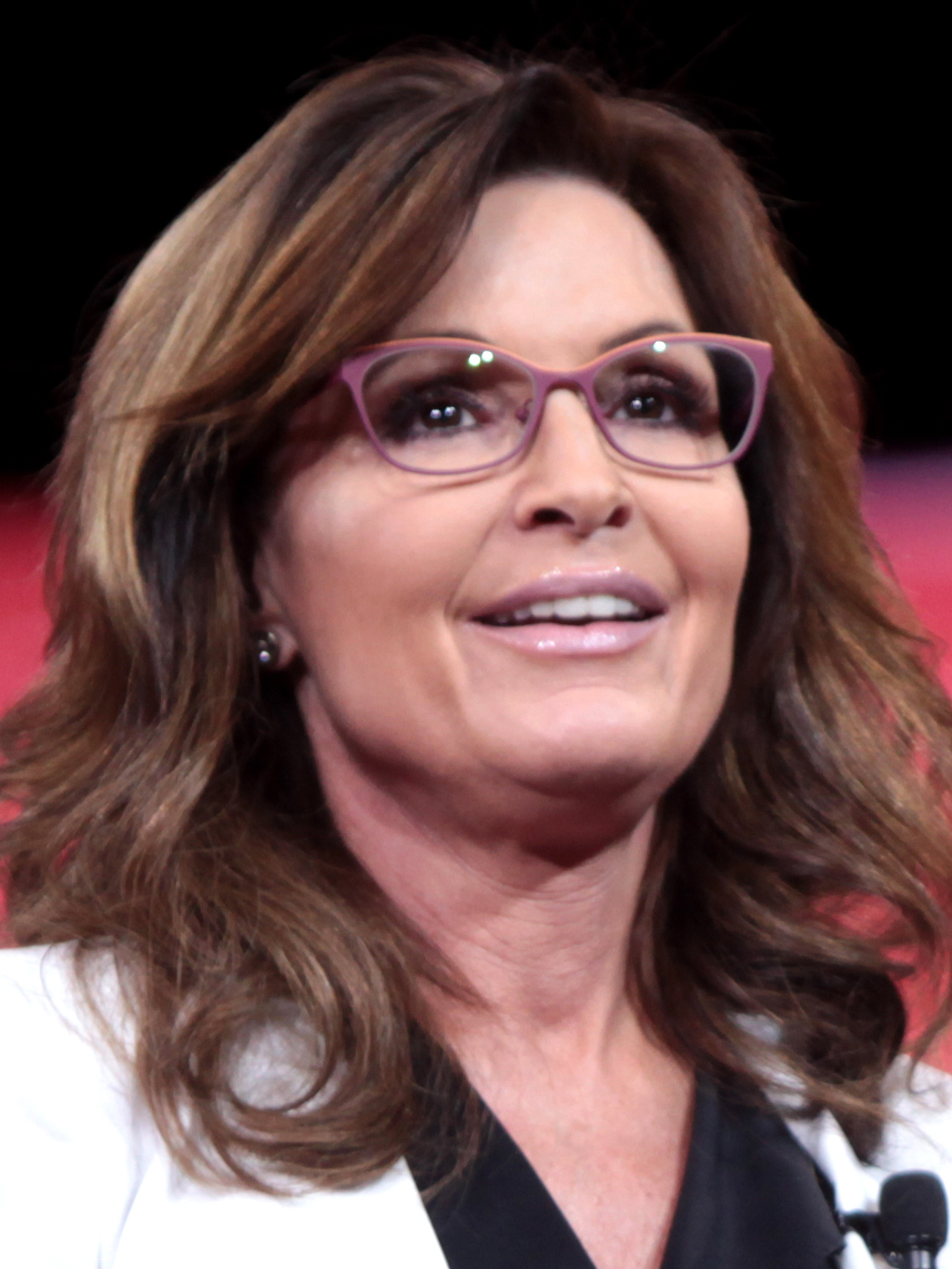
Sarah Palin
of Alaska,
(2006–2009), the 2008 Republican vice presidential nominee

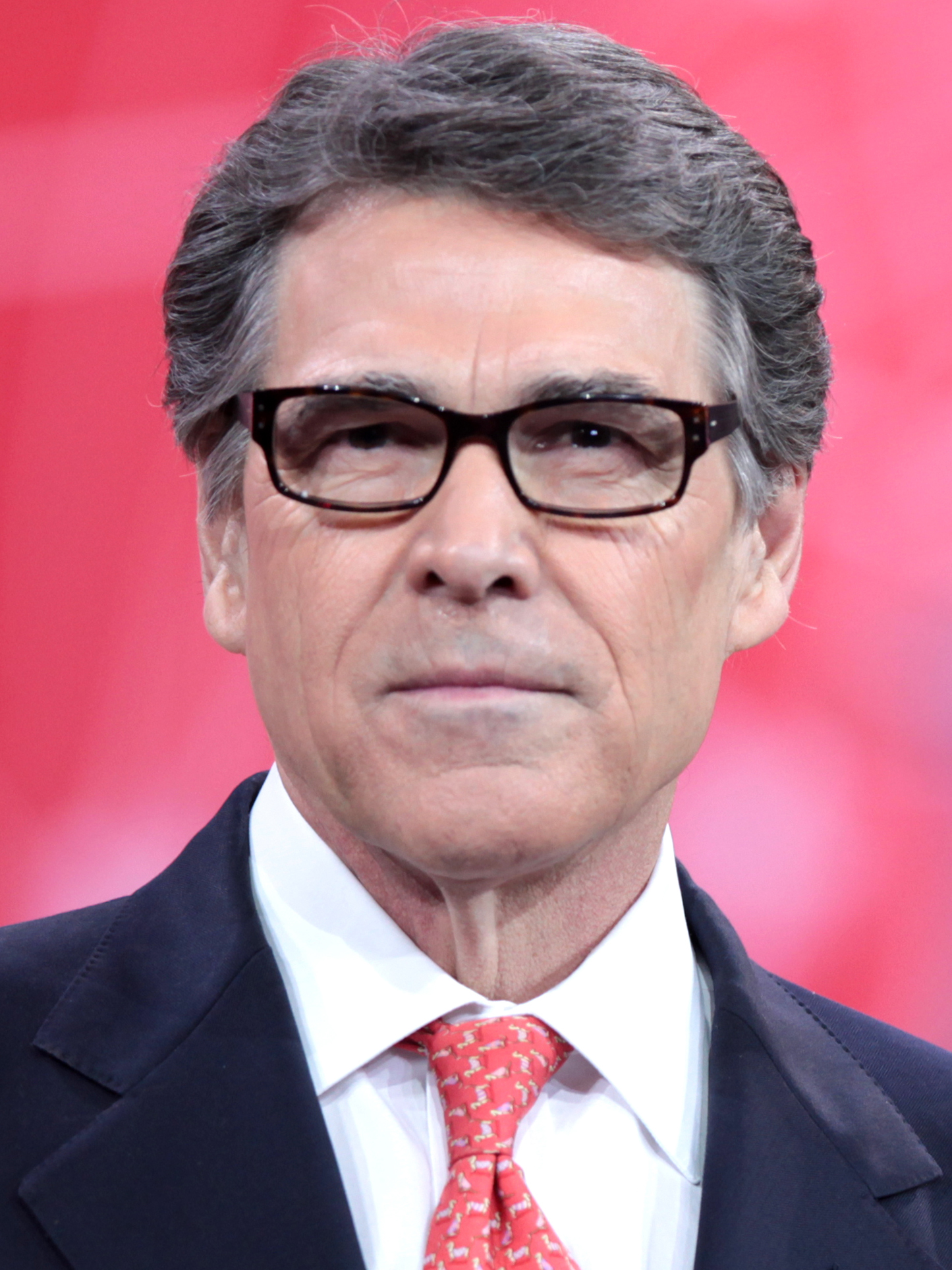
Rick Perry
of Texas (2000–2015), a 2012 and 2016 presidential candidate

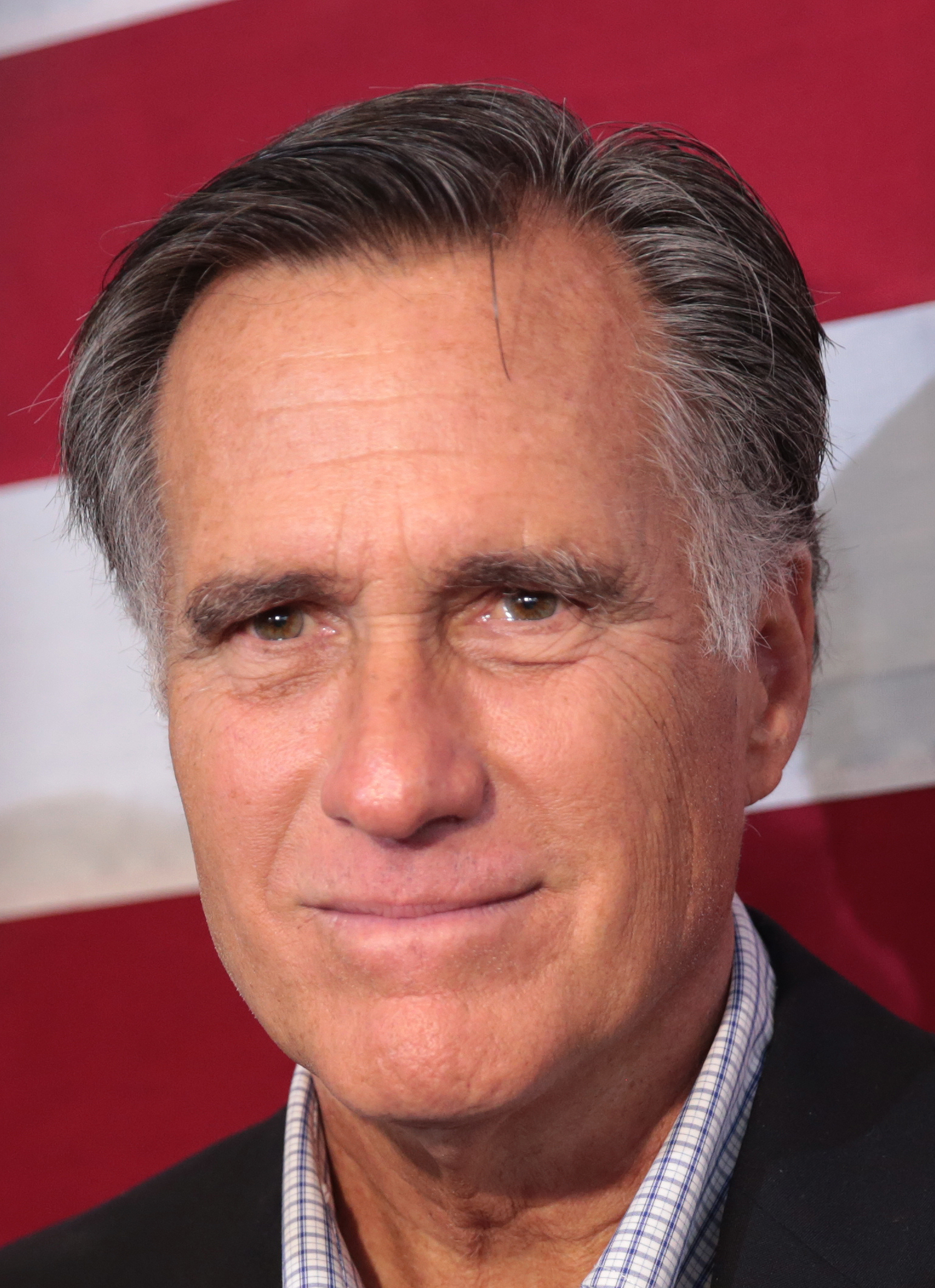
Mitt Romney
of Massachusetts (2003–2007), a 2012 presidential nominee

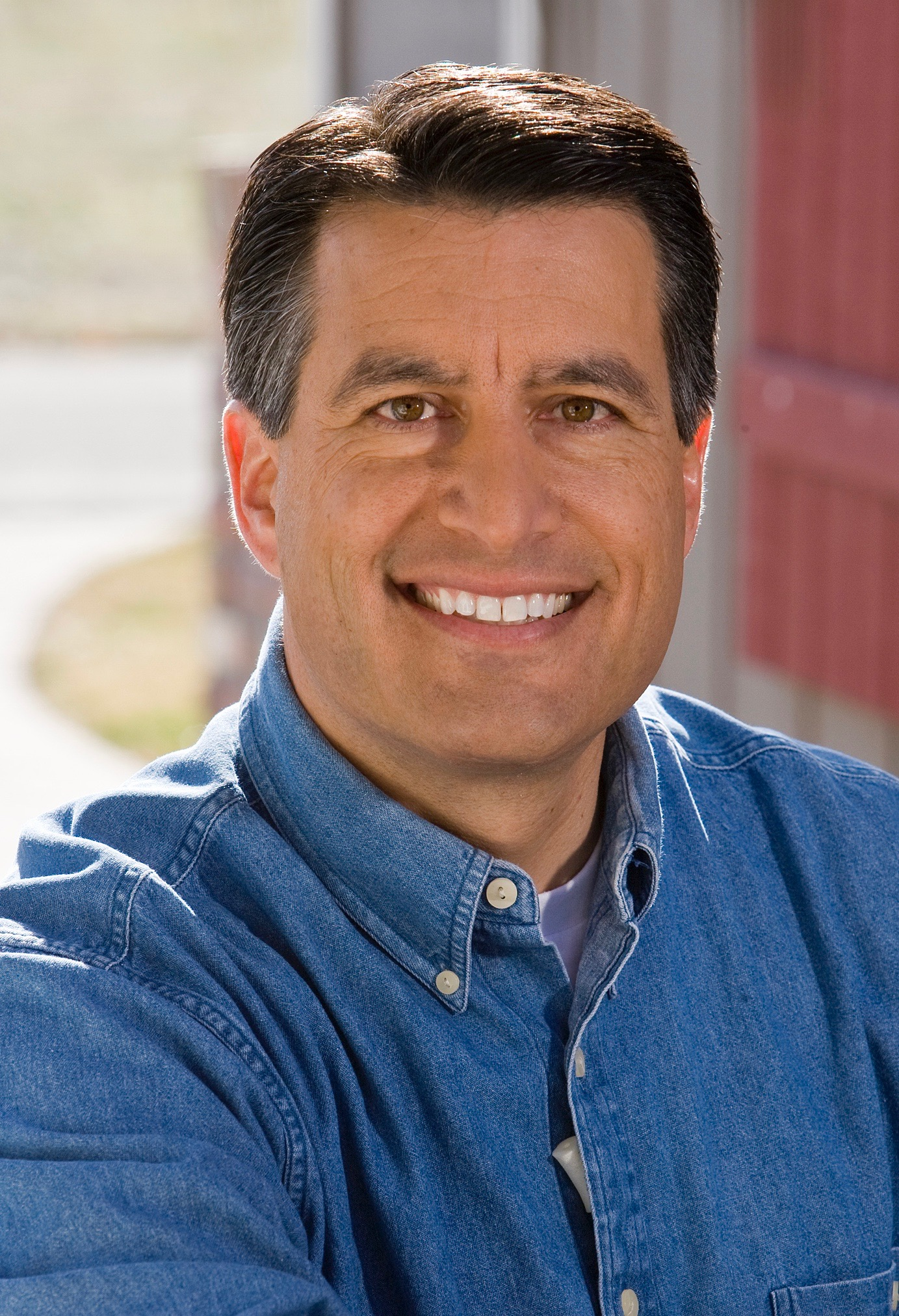
Brian Sandoval
of Nevada

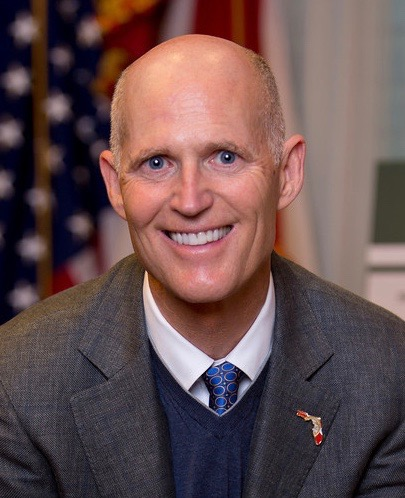
Rick Scott
of Florida

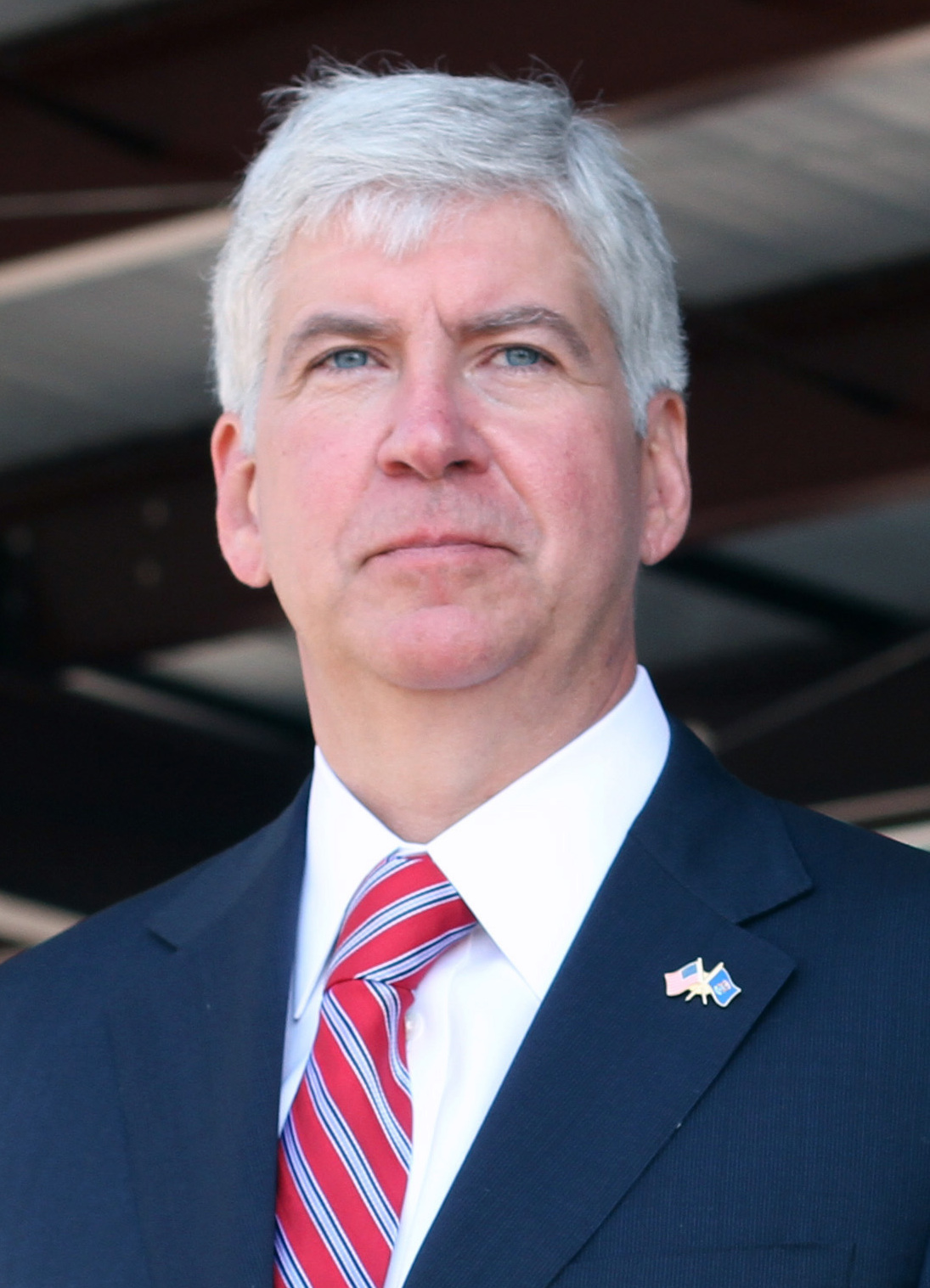
Rick Snyder
of Michigan

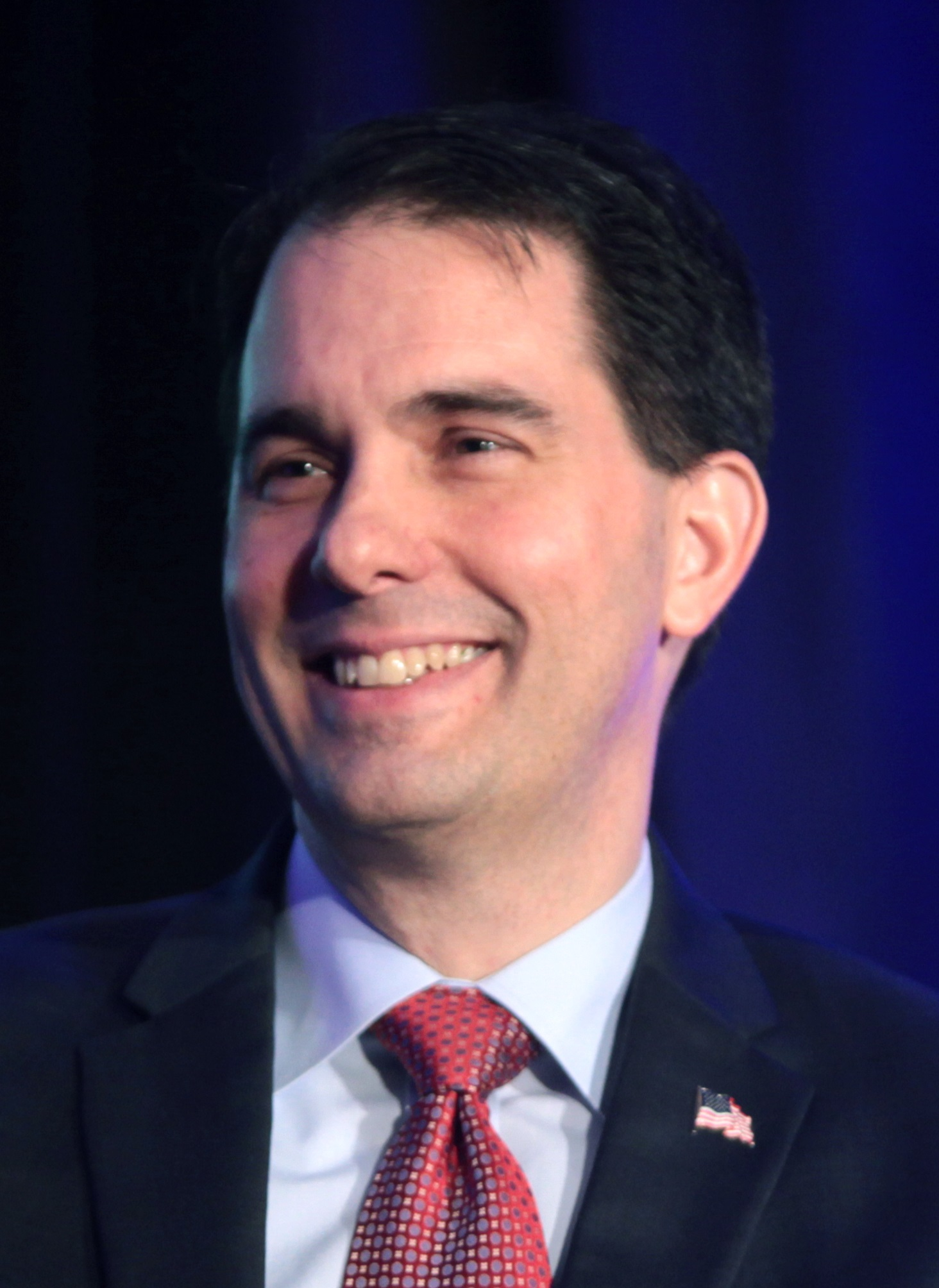
Scott Walker
of Wisconsin, a 2016 presidential candidate

=== Others ===
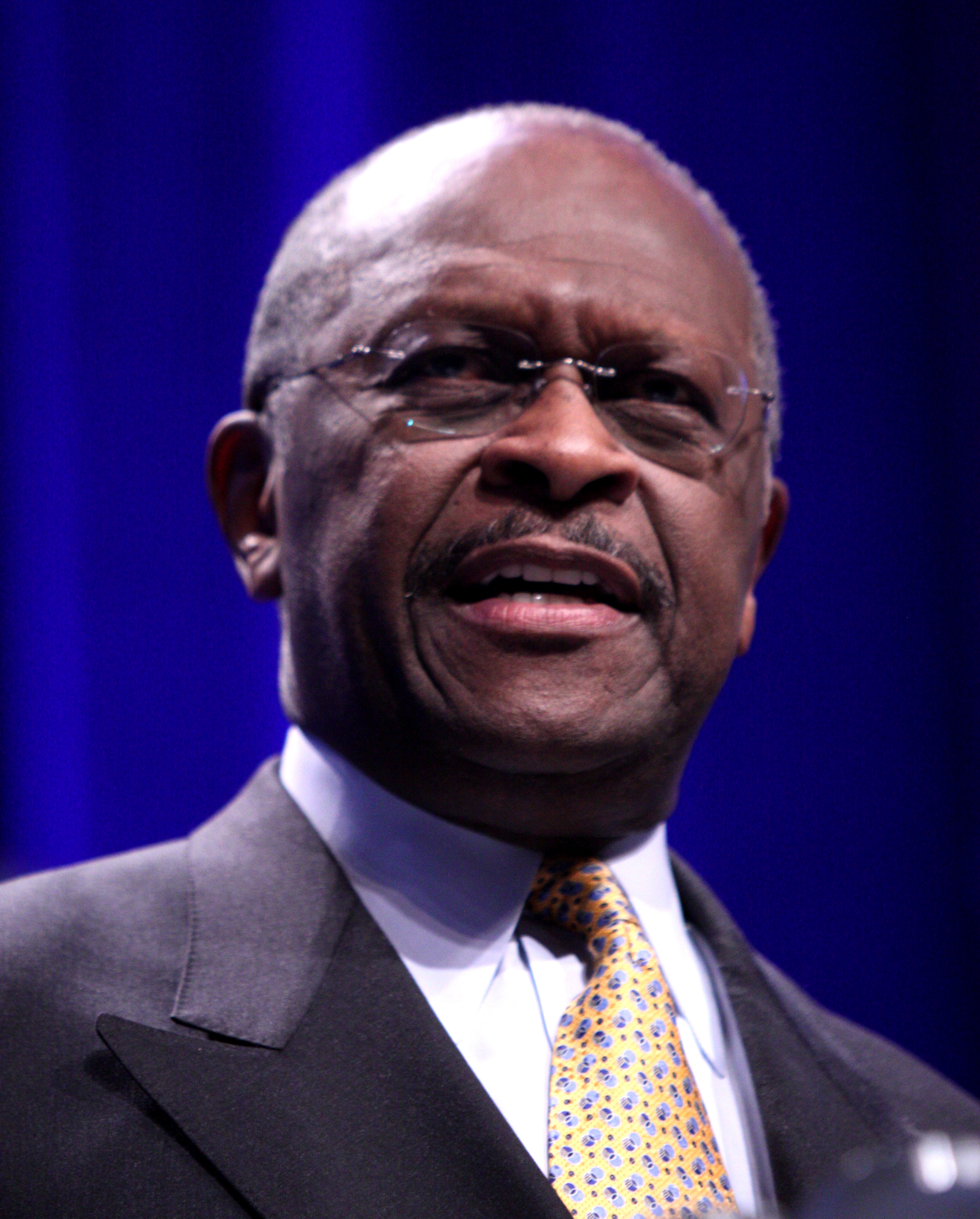
Businessman
Herman Cain
from Georgia, a 2000 and 2012 presidential candidate

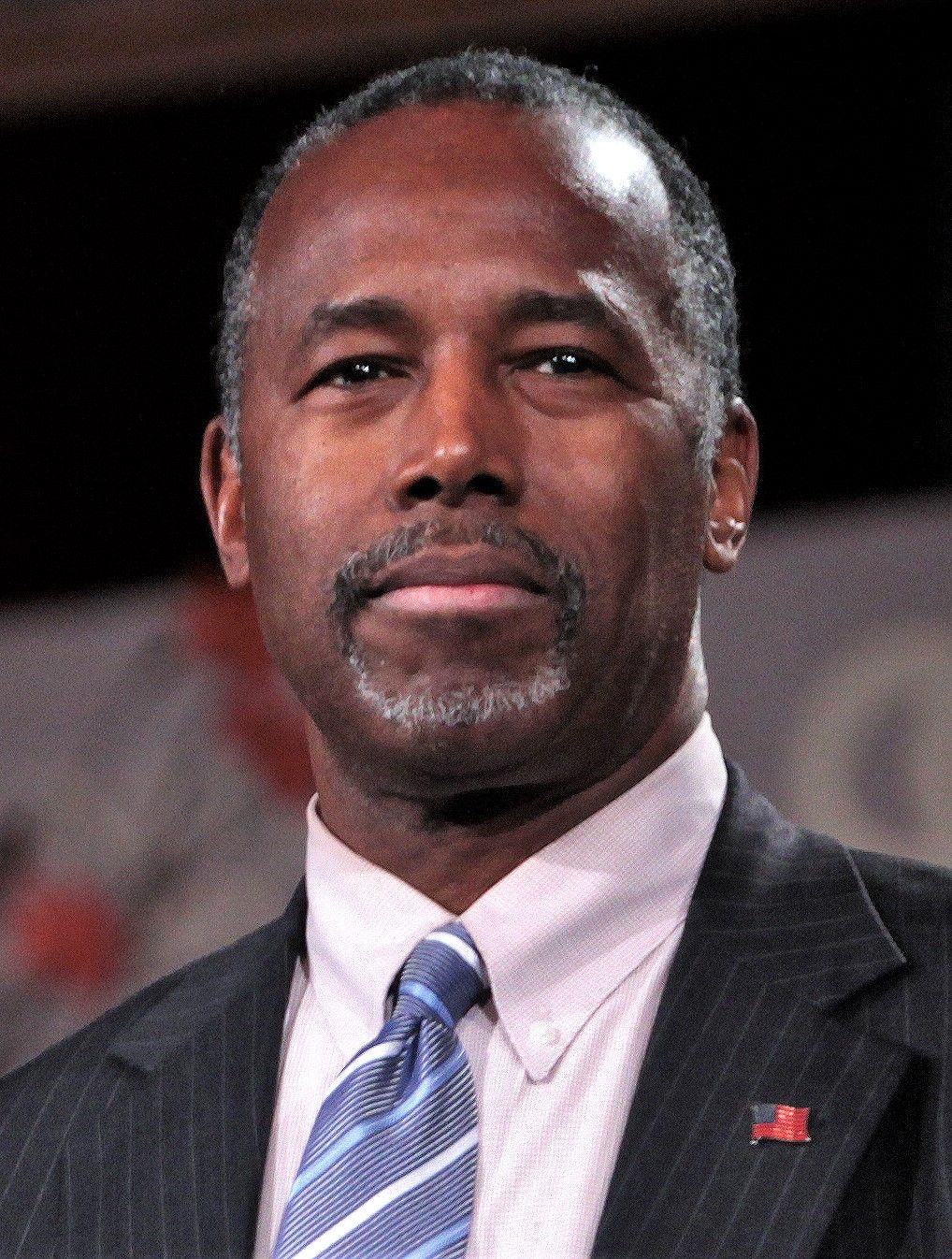
Retired neurosurgeon
Ben Carson
from Maryland, a 2016 presidential candidate

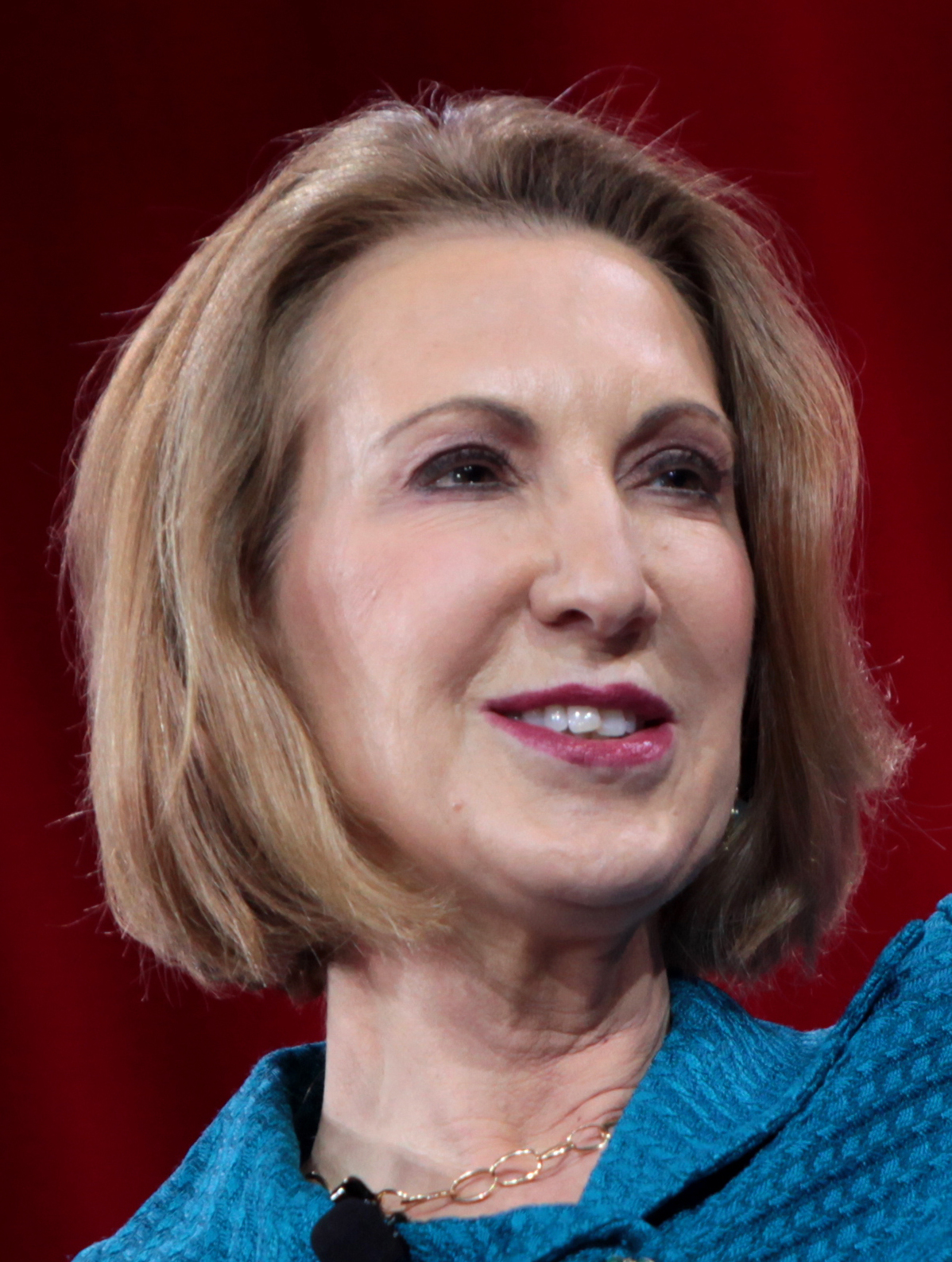
Former Hewlett-Packard CEO
Carly Fiorina
from California, a 2016 presidential candidate

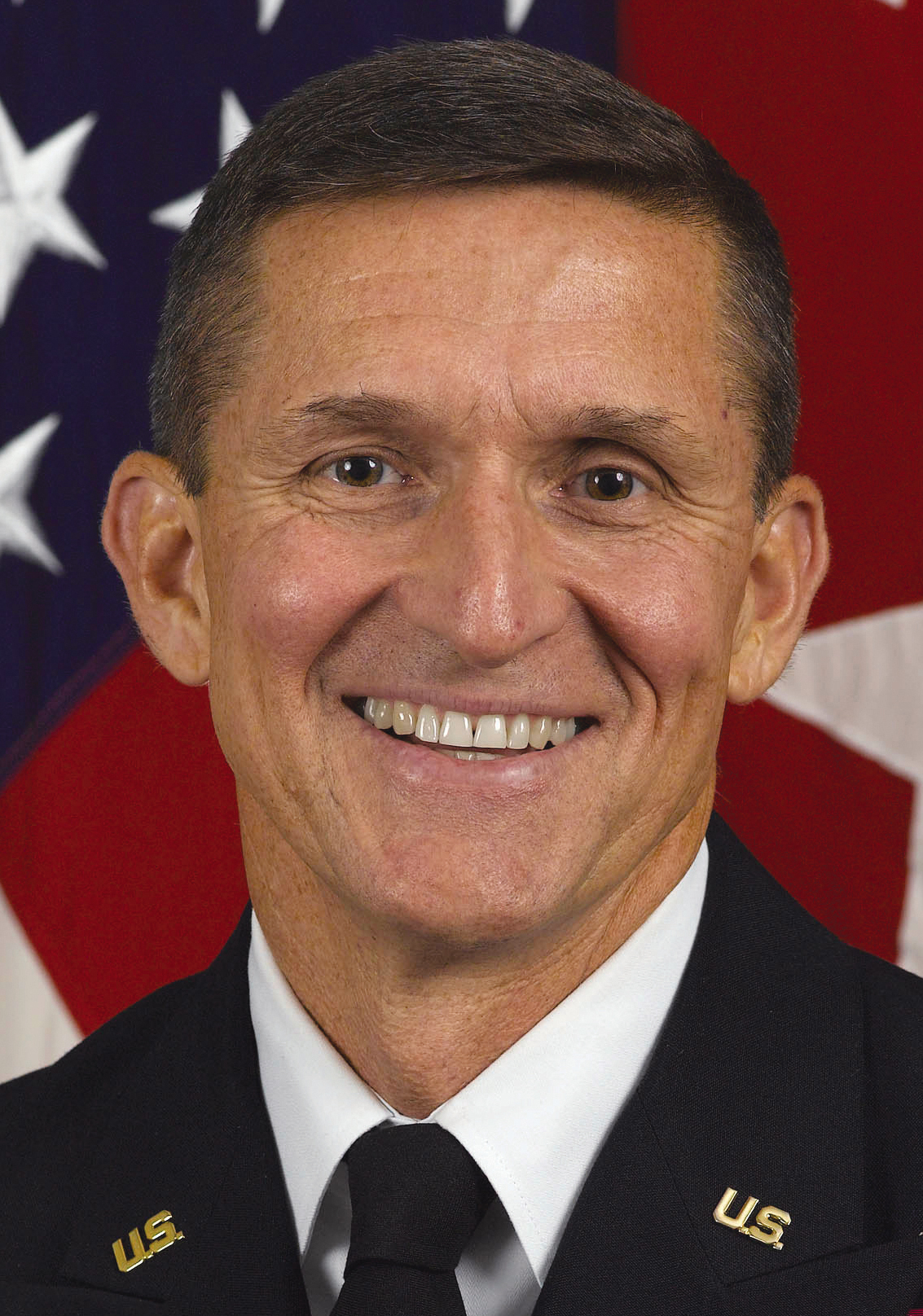
Retired General
Michael T. Flynn, former Director of the Defense Intelligence Agency

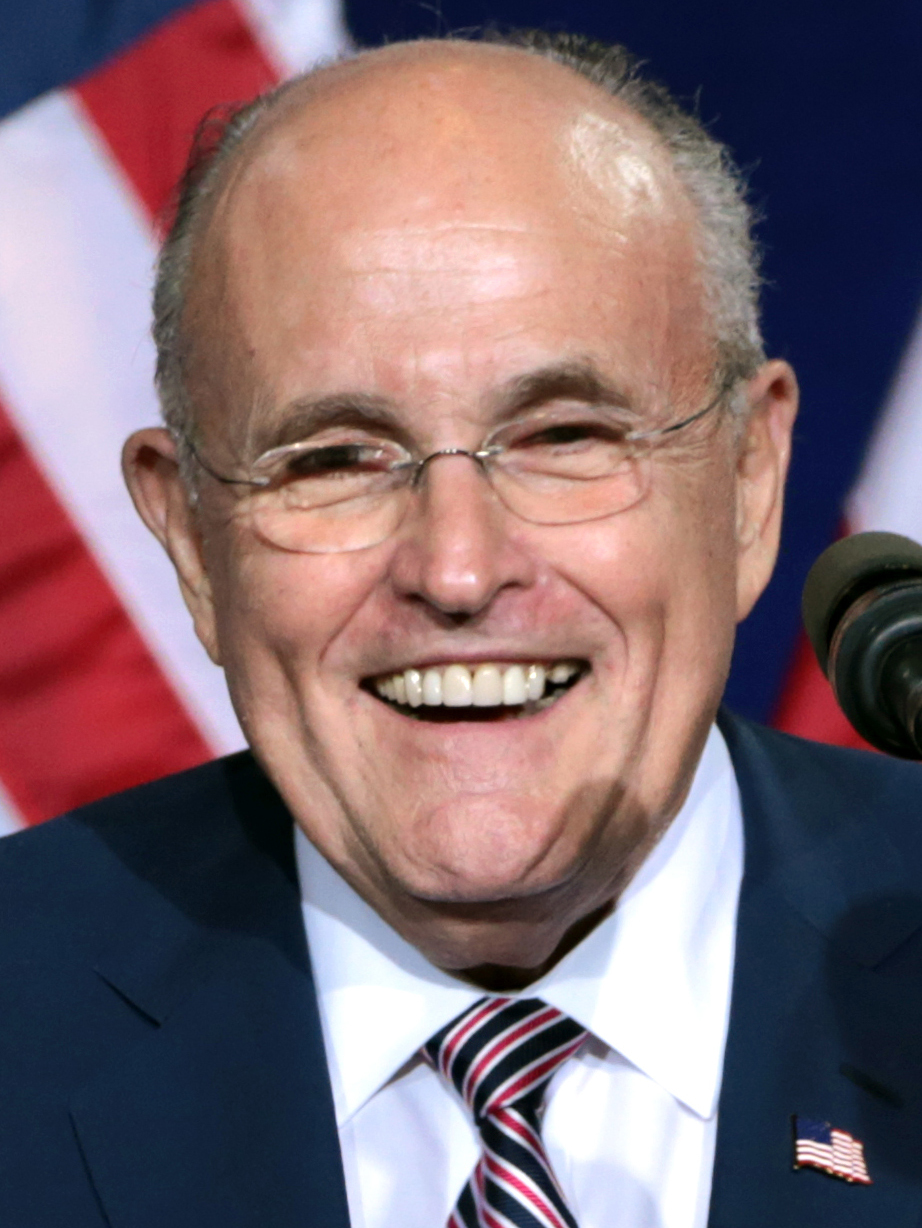
Former New York City Mayor
Rudy Giuliani
from New York, a 2008 presidential candidate

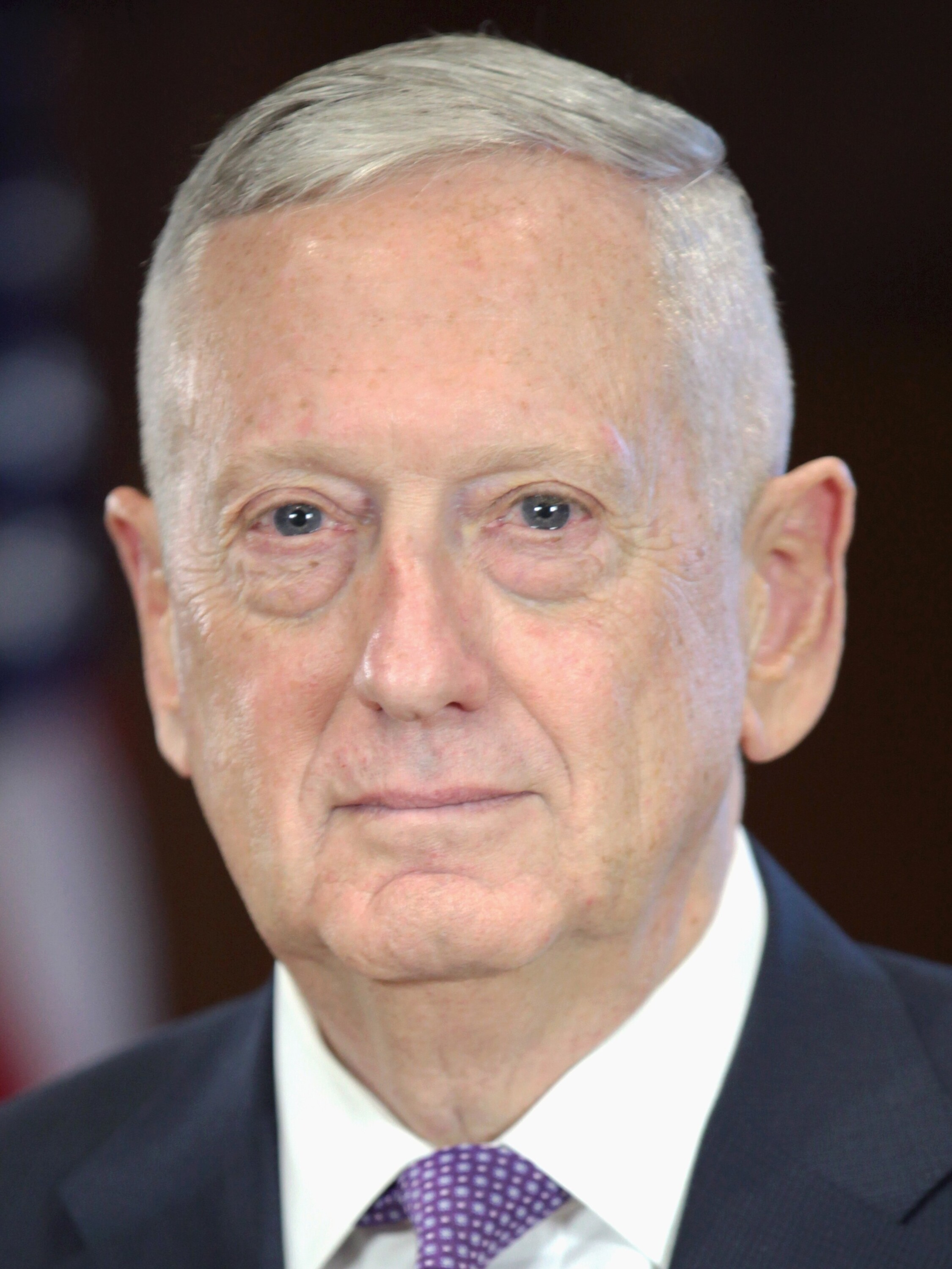
Retired General
James Mattis, former commander of the United States Central Command

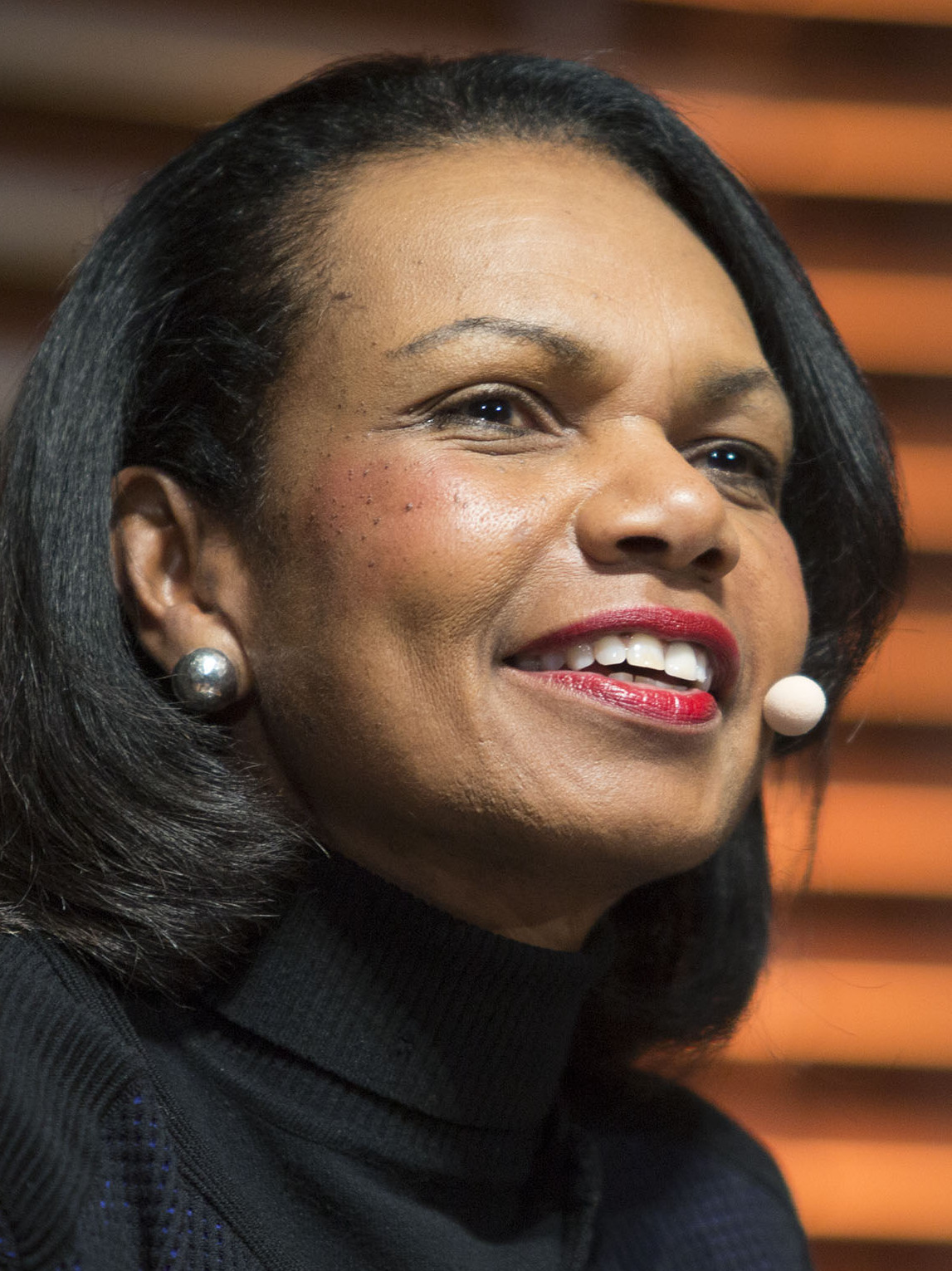
Former Secretary of State
Condoleezza Rice
from California

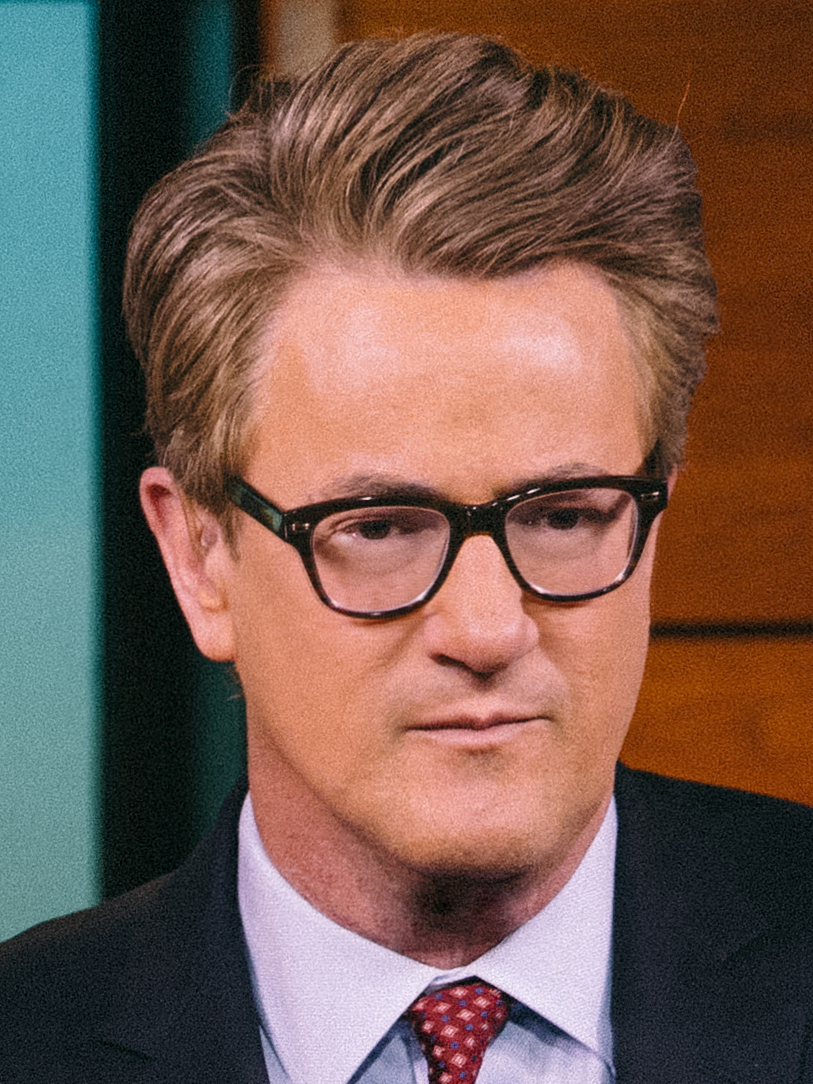
Television host and former Representative
Joe Scarborough
from Florida

== Announcement ==
On July 14, it was reported that Mike Pence had been selected as Donald Trump's running mate, following his acceptance of Trump's offer. Trump had planned to officially announce his choice on July 15 at 11 am. ET, in Manhattan, but, following a terrorist attack in Promenade des Anglais, Nice, France, announced the day prior that he would postpone the announcement. On the morning of July 15, Trump announced via Twitter his choice of Indiana Governor Mike Pence as his vice presidential running mate. Trump made the formal announcement at a news conference at 11 a.m. on July 16. Pence had been running for re-election as governor of Indiana, but Indiana law prevented him from appearing on the election ballot twice, so he suspended his gubernatorial campaign. Within the Trump campaign, Pence emerged as a potential running mate in May due to the backing of senior advisers Kellyanne Conway and Paul Manafort. CNN reported that multiple sources told them that Trump had second thoughts on the Pence pick and attempted to pick Christie instead, though the Trump campaign denied those reports. Following the selection, The New York Times noted that Pence is a "sturdy and predictable politician" who has a strong appeal to the Christian right. On July 19, the second night of the 2016 Republican National Convention, Pence won the vice presidential nomination by acclamation.

== See also ==
- Donald Trump 2016 presidential campaign
- 2016 Republican Party presidential candidates
- 2016 Republican Party presidential primaries
- 2016 Republican National Convention
- 2016 United States presidential election
- List of United States major party presidential tickets
