= Political positions of Newt Gingrich =

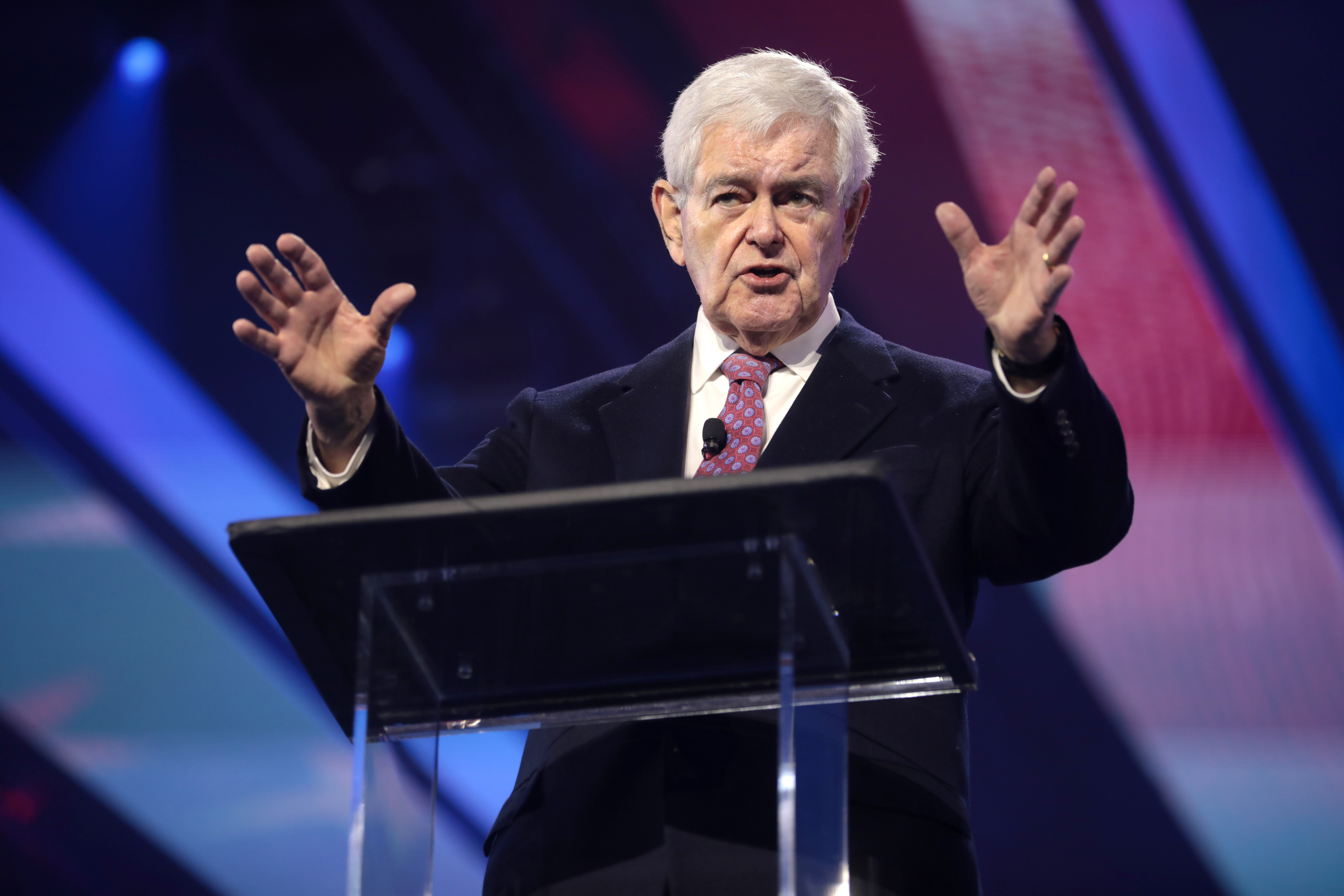
Gingrich in 2022, addressing people at AmericaFest

Newt Gingrich has declared his position on many political issues through his public comments and legislative record, including as Speaker of the House. The political initiative with which he is most widely identified was the Contract With America, which outlined an economic and social agenda designed to improve the efficiency of government while reducing its burden on the American taxpayer. Passage of the Contract helped establish Gingrich's reputation as a public intellectual. His engagement of public issues has continued through to the present, in particular as the founder of American Solutions for Winning the Future.

Gingrich's policy reach covers everything from national security to personal responsibility, but Gingrich has been known to take stances that are different from the traditional Republican line. For instance, on immigration, he favors a strong border policy but also favors a guest worker program. He also supports the idea of electing presidents with the national popular vote instead of the Electoral College.

Gingrich has authored or co-authored 16 non-fiction books since 1982, several of them bestsellers. In recent years, his works have had a more large-scale policy focus, including Winning the Future, and the most recent, To Save America. In recent years, Gingrich has identified education as "the number one factor in our future prosperity", and received national attention for partnering with Al Sharpton and Education Secretary Arne Duncan to promote the issue.

== "Replacement of the Left" ==
On November 18, 2010, Gingrich delivered a speech before the Republican Governors Association Conference in San Diego outlining 12 steps for what he called a "Replacement of the Left" strategy. In his speech, Gingrich said that the Republican election day victories of 2009 and 2010 should be followed by further victories over the next two years that would give the Republican party a large enough majority to replace what he called an increasingly leftist political system that has dominated American politics since 1932, largely through the influence of unelected bureaucracies. According to Gingrich, the strategy would be best pursued at the local level by lawmakers and activists in all 50 states rather than relying on leaders in Washington, D.C.

The 12 steps cover economic issues and entitlement reform, as well as education reform from K-12 through the collegiate level, including a "parents right to know" standards in education notifications. Specific steps address tying unemployment compensation to job training programs, replacing the Patient Protection and Affordable Care Act (PPACA) with state-based healthcare solutions and implementing ideas from business leaders to reduce the overall cost of government.

In December 2010, Gingrich began hosting the first of five scheduled Internet seminars to educate state lawmakers across the country about how to begin implementing the strategy before the 2012 elections.

== Domestic policy ==
=== Abortion ===
Gingrich is generally regarded as an anti-abortion candidate. The policy section of Gingrich's 2012 campaign web site states that he would "end taxpayer subsidies for abortion by repealing Obamacare, defunding Planned Parenthood, and reinstating the 'Mexico City Policy' which banned funding to organizations that promote and/or perform abortions overseas".

In 1995, when he was Speaker of the House, Gingrich advocated taxpayer funding of abortion services in cases of rape, incest, or protecting the life of the mother. In 1998, influential Christian broadcaster James Dobson criticized Gingrich for not working hard enough to eliminate funding for family-planning programs. Gingrich has since modified his position to oppose federal funding of abortions in all cases.

In an interview with Jake Tapper of ABC News in late 2011, Gingrich stated that he believed life began at "implantation". He has been criticized by socially conservative Republican presidential primary opponents Rick Santorum and Michele Bachmann for not consistently supporting the position that life begins at conception.

On December 12, 2011, he wrote to the board of The Family Leader that he "believes that life begins at conception". He promised on the first day of work as president to "sign an executive order reinstating President Ronald Reagan's Mexico City policy that prevents taxpayer dollars from being used to fund abortions overseas"; he will "repeal Obamacare, defund Planned Parenthood".

=== Judiciary ===
In 2011, while campaigning for the Republican nomination for president, Gingrich became the "loudest and fiercest critic" among a Republican field of "judicial-branch haters," frequently criticizing federal judges and judges. In December 2011, Gingrich termed the courts "grotesquely dictatorial and far too powerful" and said that as president, he would abolish whole courts whose decisions he disagrees with, asking "Are we forced for a lifetime to keep someone on the bench who is so radically anti-American that they are a threat to the fabric of the country?" Gingrich has particularly singled out the Ninth Circuit Court of Appeals for criticism, saying that it should be abolished because it is too liberal and "radically Anti-American."

Gingrich has said that if elected president, he would defy Supreme Court rulings that he opposed, citing the 2008 decision in Boumediene v. Bush as an example. Gingrich also said that if president, he might ignore a Supreme Court ruling recognizing a constitutional right to same-sex marriage.

Gingrich has frequently criticized what he termed "judicial activism" and in an appearance on Face the Nation in 2011 suggested that Congress should subpoena federal judges and force them to explain themselves before Congress. When host Bob Schieffer asked how he would force federal judges to comply with congressional subpoenas, Gingrich said he would send the U.S. Capitol Police or U.S. Marshals to arrest the judges and force them to testify. Gingrich's proposal drew criticism across the political spectrum. Harvard Law School professor Laurence Tribe (who described it as "a frontal assault on the independence of the federal judiciary" and "one of the craziest and most obviously unconstitutional things the former Speaker has ever proposed"), prominent conservative lawyer Bruce Fein (who wrote that "Gingrich unwittingly is proposing to overthrow the Constitution that he would be pledged to uphold and defend if elected"), and U.S. District Judge John L. Kane (who wrote that Gingrich's proposal would contravene the rule of law and the notion of judicial independence as set forth in Federalist No. 78). Eventual 2012 Republican presidential nominee Mitt Romney, former Republican Attorneys General Michael Mukasey and Alberto Gonzales, conservative attorney Edward Whelan and the nonpartisan Justice at Stake group all criticized Gingrich's comments for similar reasons.

Gingrich has stated that he believes the Warren Court misinterpreted Marbury v. Madison in its Cooper v. Aaron decision and went too far in asserting that only the Supreme Court has final and binding interpretive authority over the two other branches of the federal government in defining the meaning of the Constitution.

=== Child labor laws ===
Gingrich has said that children should be able to work at an earlier age. He said: "You say to somebody, you shouldn't go to work before you're what, 14, 16 years of age, fine," Mr. Gingrich said. "You're totally poor. You're in a school that is failing with a teacher that is failing. I've tried for years to have a very simple model. Most of these schools ought to get rid of the unionized janitors, have one master janitor and pay local students to take care of the school. The kids would actually do work, they would have cash, they would have pride in the schools, they'd begin the process of rising." He later clarified his position, saying he was not proposing major changes in the law or encouraging children to seek jobs instead of attending school, but rather was "talking about working 20 hours a week and being empowered to succeed".

=== Campaign finance regulation ===
Gingrich opposes restrictions on campaign contributions, which he says make "it impossible for a candidate of average means to go out and raise the resources" needed for a campaign. In a 2006 article in the National Review, Gingrich stated that current campaign finance rules have moved the U.S. "dangerously closer to a plutocracy where the highest bidder can buy a seat."

Gingrich opposed the McCain–Feingold campaign finance reform bill, which was passed in 2002 and prohibits unrestricted donations to candidates from wealthy individuals, corporations and labor unions. In his book Winning the Future, Gingrich criticized McCain-Feingold for creating a "more irresponsible" system than before its passage, in which 527s and other extra-campaign activities increased, and "rich people ironically had an even greater impact" on elections. Among other unintended consequences, Gingrich writes, the election process has "devolved into an incumbency protection racket", whereby lobbyists and PACs raise large amounts of money for incumbents, discourage potential opponents, which frees incumbents to "spend more time at Washington PAC fundraisers". In addition, McCain–Feingold's "ridiculously low contribution limits" require candidates to spend even more time focused on raising money.

He has called for a system where individuals are allowed to donate unlimited amounts to Congressional candidates within their district, however requiring that all donations be reported online immediately.

=== Drug policy ===
In 1982, Gingrich wrote a letter supporting medical marijuana, a position he later abandoned. While serving in Congress, Gingrich introduced H.R. 4170, the Drug Importer Death Penalty Act of 1996. The legislation would have required a court to sentence a first-time drug importer to life in prison or a multiple-time offender to death.

In a November 2011 interview, Gingrich reaffirmed his support for giving the death penalty to some drug smugglers, such as cartel leaders, and said "we need to think through a strategy that makes it radically less likely that we're going to have drugs in this country". He commented that places with "very draconian" drug policies like Singapore have been the most successful at doing that.

=== Education ===
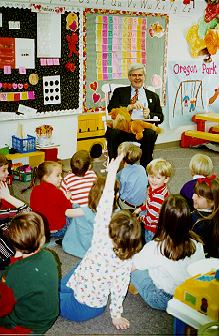
Gingrich at an elementary school in Georgia during the 1990s

Gingrich favors rigorous mathematics and science instruction in public schools, introducing competition between schools and between teachers, and permitting public school prayer.

In 2009, Gingrich, alongside civil rights activist Al Sharpton and the Secretary of the U.S. Department of Education, Arne Duncan, visited a number of U.S. schools that were implementing education reforms, on November 15, 2009, they appeared together on NBC's Sunday morning news and interview program Meet the Press. During their interview Gingrich said that "education is the number one factor in our future prosperity, it's the number one factor in national security and it's the number one factor in [our] young people having a decent future. I agree with Al Sharpton, this is the number one civil right of the 21st century."

Gingrich's 2010 book To Save America: Stopping Obama's Secular-Socialist Machine, the chapter co-authored by Lisa Keegan, Nancy Sinnott Dwight, and Fred Asbell, states, "We must be an intellectually hungry, morally strong, and urgently demanding nation with an education system capable of responding to a voracious American desire to learn."

==== Student debt ====
During his 2012 presidential campaign, Gingrich criticized the Federal Direct Student Loan Program, saying it allowed students "to stay in college longer because they don’t see the cost." He further called it a "Ponzi scheme".

=== Electoral College ===
"Unfortunately, the current system for electing presidents does not reflect this [country's] tremendous diversity. The winner-take-all-method of allotting electoral votes means candidates must focus their efforts on just a handful of closely divided states."

— Newt Gingrich, 2014, in a letter to National Popular Vote Inc.

In 2014, Gingrich sent a letter to John Koza of National Popular Vote Inc. endorsing the National Popular Vote Interstate Compact, under which presidents would be elected by the national popular vote and not by the United States Electoral College. In 2016, following Donald Trump's electoral victory but loss in the popular vote, Gingrich explained Trump didn't set out to win the popular vote and prioritized winning the Electoral College, "Remember, in 49 states, [Trump] had a 2.2 million-vote majority, and then there’s California ... We don’t compete in California."

=== Energy policy ===
On energy policy, Gingrich is most closely associated with proposals that would increase domestic energy production, and with opposition to policies that would increase energy costs through regulation, taxation or international treaties that would limit energy production. He has described his approach to finding new domestic energy sources as an "'all of the above' energy strategy". As Speaker of the House in 1998, Gingrich spoke out against a proposed federal gas tax. He has repeatedly stated that creating new energy regulations and taxes during an economic downturn would be a "recipe for disaster". Conversely, he has argued that lowering energy prices would create jobs and save Americans money.

In 2009, Gingrich's organization American Solutions for Winning the Future launched a "Stop the Energy Tax" petition campaign which As of January 2011 has collected over 230,000 signatures opposing the regulation of carbon by the Environmental Protection Agency and the enactment of any laws imposing "new energy taxes and/or establishing a national cap and trade system for carbon dioxide". Gingrich has opposed Barack Obama's proposed Cap-and-Trade legislation. In April 2009 he gave testimony before the House Energy and Commerce Committee, saying it would have no impact on global temperatures while simultaneously hurting the American economy.

Also in 2008, American Solutions launched a widely noted campaign, "Drill Here. Drill Now. Pay Less." The group began circulating an online petition calling for the government to authorize new drilling onshore and offshore in an effort to lower gas and diesel prices. The petition drew over one million signatures. The group was one of several advocacy groups and politicians that called for more drilling, and in September 2008, Congress allowed a 25-year ban on offshore drilling to expire.

Gingrich also published Drill Here, Drill Now, Pay Less: A Handbook for Slashing Gas Prices and Solving Our Energy Crisis, which outlines a plan for reducing both gas prices and America's dependence on foreign oil. Throughout the book, Gingrich argues that gas prices and overall rising energy costs are a reflection of bad government policy rather than a scarcity of resources. Gingrich proposes tapping into American oil reserves along with pursuing other energy resources including nuclear, coal and renewable energy resources.

Gingrich is an advocate of a flex-fuel mandate for automobiles sold in the United States. He has stated that flex-fuel vehicles are important for national security, while also providing greater competition in the fuel market and improving consumer choice. Gingrich's advocacy of ethanol has been criticized by some conservative publications, including National Review and The Wall Street Journal.

Beginning in February 2012, Gingrich responded to the rising price of gasoline nationwide by emphasizing his proposal for American energy independence as a major theme of his campaign. In a letter published by Human Events, Gingrich called for dramatically expanding the federal land open for oil and gas production with the stated goal of increasing supply. Citing oil prices of $1.13 a gallon on average from 1995 to 1999, and $1.89 a gallon when President Obama took office, Gingrich suggested $2.50 a gallon could be an attainable price with policies that permitted the maximum increase in gasoline production. On February 19, 2011, in an appearance on Fox News Sunday, Gingrich was critical of the Obama administration's energy policies and accused the president of being "anti-American–energy." Subsequently, President Obama announced a speech on energy policy on February 23, 2011, which news organizations including MSNBC, CBS and the Wall Street Journal attributed in part to Gingrich's criticisms.

=== Entitlement reform ===
In writings, speeches and interviews, Gingrich has argued that Medicaid, Medicare, Social Security, and other entitlement programs are fiscally unsustainable. Without reform, according to Gingrich, this will cause major financial problems, such as large benefit reductions or massive tax increases. In order to avoid these outcomes, Gingrich supports what he calls a "replacement approach" to entitlement reform. He argues that entitlement programs need fundamental restructuring in order to strengthen incentives for work and productivity. Gingrich cites the reform of Aid to Families with Dependent Children passed in the 1990s as a model for future policymaking. Gingrich has argued that the current welfare and unemployment insurance system continues to create work disincentives that trap people in poverty. He has proposed replacing these systems with an offer of guaranteed employment for the able-bodied, preferably in the private sector to save taxpayer money, or retraining. Beneficiaries who work enough hours would receive Medicare vouchers and housing assistance.

He also supports personal accounts for Social Security and Medicare, funded using the employee's portion of FICA payroll taxes, to replace all or part of the benefits paid under the current system. According to Gingrich, private accounts would offer workers retirement and medical benefits much better than what these programs currently offer while greatly reducing the need for government spending.

In May 2011, following an appearance on Meet the Press, Gingrich was criticized by some conservatives for using the phrase "right-wing social engineering" in apparent reference to Rep. Paul Ryan's voucher system plan for Medicare. In later statements, Gingrich said he was speaking to a general principle that major reforms require the support of the American people, and offered support for Ryan's efforts to promote reform.

=== Environment ===
Gingrich describes himself as a "Teddy Roosevelt Republican" and has professed a deep interest in conservation and maintaining biological diversity. Before being elected to Congress, he taught an environmental studies class at West Georgia College, and while in office, he was known as one of the most environmentally conscious Republicans. Gingrich co-sponsored the reauthorization of the Endangered Species Act and supported the 1990 Clean Air Act and the Rhinoceros and Tiger Fund.

In 2007, Gingrich released the book A Contract with the Earth, co-written with Terry Maple. In the book, Gingrich presented his policies for a market-based approach to environmentalism that incentivizes conservation and green technology, rather than relying on regulations or litigation. In particular, Gingrich has proposed using monetary prizes and tax incentives to spur environmentally friendly innovations, such as hydrogen engines, 100-mile-per-gallon conventional fuel engines and ethanol fuels that do not rely on corn or cane sugar.

In January 2011, Gingrich proposed the Environmental Protection Agency be replaced with a new organization called the Environmental Solutions Agency, which would be "dedicated to bringing together science, technology, entrepreneurs, incentives and local creativity to create a cleaner environment through smarter regulation". Gingrich criticized the EPA for focusing only on regulations and litigation, rather than innovation. He said the new agency's major energy projects would be working on developing clean coal and rewriting regulations governing the development of small nuclear plants.

==== Climate change ====
According to Science magazine, Gingrich changed his view on climate change "from cautious skeptic in the late 1980s to believer in the late 2000s to skeptic again during the [2016] campaign."

In February 2007 Gingrich stated that he "would strongly support" a cap and trade system for reducing carbon emissions based on the success of the Acid Rain Program enacted by Congress during his tenure. He later changed his position, saying that such a trading system "would lead to corruption, political favoritism, and would have a huge impact on the economy".

In April 2007 Gingrich called for "Green conservatism" and carbon-reduction tax credits. More recently Gingrich has expressed skepticism that mankind is significantly altering the climate and has preferred curbing carbon emissions through market-incentives instead of by taxes or cap-and-trade plans. He has opposed the Kyoto Protocol, stating that the protocols unfairly favor Europe, China and India to the disadvantage of the U.S.

In 2008, Gingrich accepted an invitation from Al Gore to appear with Democratic House Speaker Nancy Pelosi in a commercial produced by one of Gore's climate advocacy organizations. In the ad, Gingrich stated that he and Pelosi "agree our country must take action to address climate change". In 2011, Gingrich said his appearance in the ad was "the dumbest single thing I've done".

=== Free speech ===
Gingrich opposed a Senate amendment to the Communications Decency Act of 1996 that banned "indecent" content from the Internet, saying it "is clearly a violation of free speech and it's a violation of the right of adults to communicate with each other". The amendment remained in the enacted legislation, but in Reno v. ACLU (1997) the Supreme Court struck it down.

Gingrich was one of the 71 co-sponsors of a bill to reinstate the Fairness Doctrine after the Federal Communications Commission stopped enforcing the rule in 1987. In 2006, he indicated that free speech might need to be curtailed to fight terrorism, saying "Either before we lose a city or, if we are truly stupid, after we lose a city, we will adopt rules of engagement that use every technology we can find to break up their capacity to use the Internet, to break up their capacity to use free speech, and to go after people who want to kill us to stop them from recruiting people."

=== Health care ===
Gingrich opposes the Patient Protection and Affordable Care Act (PPACA). Through his organization, American Solutions for Winning the Future, Gingrich organized an online petition that secured over 100,000 signatures to support its repeal in the United States House of Representatives.

In February 2010, Gingrich and John C. Goodman, the founding president of the National Center for Policy Analysis, presented a 10-point consumer driven health care plan. Outlined in the Wall Street Journal, the plan proposes reforms to make health insurance more affordable, create alternatives to Medicare cuts, protect early retirees, cover the needs of the chronically ill, and protect doctors against frivolous lawsuits. In the book To Save America, also published in 2010, Gingrich described PPACA as "a dead end of higher taxes, bigger government, more bureaucracy and a decaying health system". With co-author Nancy Desmond, Gingrich outlined proposals for improving the American healthcare industry through a variety of means including: an overhaul of the U.S. medical research system that would reduce wastefulness, modernizing the FDA, eliminating Medicare fraud and abuse, and implementing a system of what they describe as "personalized medicine" that would improve care for individuals while reducing the costs associated with treatment. Gingrich has also called for transparency in the prices of medical devices, noting it is one of the few aspects of U.S. health care where consumers and federal health officials are "barred from comparing the quality, medical outcomes or price".

Gingrich supported the Medicare Prescription Drug, Improvement, and Modernization Act of 2003, creating the Medicare Part D federal prescription drugs benefit program. The same year, Gingrich founded the Center for Health Transformation to develop and advocate for "transformational" solutions that improve the quality of care, lower costs and expand coverage to all Americans. The Center has played a role in opposing PPACA, arguing that the plan will increase costs for both taxpayers and consumers and expand insurance coverage by growing government. The Center has released a series of charts highlighting different aspects of the legislation, focusing on the 159 new bureaucratic organizations it would create; the ten-year implementation timeline of nearly 500 related deadlines, mandates and taxes; and a claimed 1,968 new and expanded powers granted to the Secretary of Health and Human Services.

In an April 2006 newsletter the Center defended the individual mandate in Romneycare, describing "[i]ndividuals who can afford to purchase health insurance and simply choose not to" as "free-riders." In a May 15, 2011, interview with David Gregory on Meet the Press, Gingrich repeated his long-held belief that "all of us have a responsibility to pay – help pay for health care", and suggested this could be implemented by either a mandate to obtain health insurance or a requirement to post a bond ensuring coverage. In the same interview he said: "I don't think right wing social engineering is any more desirable than left wing social engineering. I don't think imposing radical change from the right or the left is a very good way for a free society to operate." This comment caused a great deal of backlash within the Republican Party and from conservative pundits. Later, on his web site, he expanded on his comments by saying he believes the federal mandate contained in the PPACA is unconstitutional and that he believes individual states should be able to decide the best way to implement healthcare programs for their citizens.

=== Jobs ===
Gingrich generally favors policies intended to stimulate job growth through reductions in government regulations and federal taxes. In September 1994, Gingrich co-authored the Contract With America, which included the Job Creation and Wage Enhancement Act. The act advocated for capital gains cuts and strengthening the Regulatory Flexibility Act. His 1995 book, To Renew America, outlined related ideas, including employer initiatives to make employees key players in improving processes and products.

Gingrich has also spoken out against unions, saying they prefer protection over competition, which hurts the economy. He has also argued that industry lawsuits lower the incentive to create jobs and invest in the American economy.

Starting in 2009, Gingrich's American Solutions advocacy organization launched a campaign called "Jobs Here. Jobs Now. Jobs First", also known as the "Real Jobs Tour", to address the issue of high unemployment levels, then approaching 10 percent across the United States. The plan put forth by the group outlined five major tax cuts to boost the American economy, including: a two-year, 50 percent reduction in payroll taxes; a 100 percent annual write-off for small businesses' new equipment purchases; adoption of the Irish corporate tax rate of 12.5 percent; and the abolishment of the estate tax and capital gains tax.

In December 2009, Gingrich hosted a jobs summit to rival one held by President Obama, focusing on tax cuts and other market-oriented incentives to spur job growth. Gingrich has been a consistent opponent of Obama's economic policies, and in October 2010 took part in his own 11-city tour to criticize the White House's economic agenda.

=== Lean Six Sigma ===
Gingrich has embraced the Lean Six Sigma principles for waste management and espouses their use in reducing the federal deficit. He was introduced to Lean Six Sigma in 2007, and has since encouraged the use of the methods for corporate and government waste reduction. In June 2011, Gingrich was the first Republican presidential candidate to sign the Lean Six Sigma "Strong America Now" pledge. The pledge commits to reducing federal government spending and starting to pay down the national debt by 2017. In a speech to The Heritage Foundation in August 2011, he stated that the waste cutting methods should be used to address the deficit, and estimated that through their application the government could identify a $3 trillion saving over 10 years by December 2011.

=== National security ===
During a 2008 appearance at Huntington, New York, Gingrich said: "The more successful they've been at intercepting and stopping bad guys the less proof there is that we're in danger. The better they've done at making sure there isn't an attack the easier it is to say there was never going to be an attack anyway. It's almost as if they should every once in a while have allowed an attack to get through just to remind us." He said: "I would divide the FBI into two agencies. I would have an anti-domestic crime FBI which was very cautious, very respectful of civil liberties, you are innocent until proven guilty. And I would have a small but very aggressive anti-terrorism agency. And I would frankly give them extraordinary ability to eavesdrop. And my first advice to civil libertarians is simple. Don't plot with terrorists."

=== Prison reform ===
Gingrich supports prison reform; he has stated that spending on prisons is too high, and increasing incarceration is unsustainable. According to a Washington Post op-ed Gingrich co-authored with Pat Nolan, as a supporter of the conservative "Right on Crime Campaign", he is in favor of diverting funding from prisons to probation services and "proven community corrections approaches". In April 2011, Gingrich wrote to the NAACP in support of its call for criminal justice system reform. The letter emphasized the need for "humane alternatives" to incarceration and the potential for prison reform to create savings for taxpayers. He also placed emphasis on the impact of current criminal justice policies on communities and stated that he supports a reform that includes "policies that will strengthen the families, neighborhood institutions, and places of worship that we as conservatives believe are the central pillars of society."

=== Religion ===
"The fight against Sharia and the maddrassas and mosques which teach hatred and fanaticism is the heart of the enemy movement from which the terrorists spring forth. ... One of the things I am going to suggest today is a federal law which says no court anywhere in the United States under any circumstance is allowed to consider Sharia as a replacement for American law."

— Newt Gingrich, 2010, at the American Enterprise Institute

Speaking in San Antonio, Texas, on March 26, 2011, Gingrich said, "I have two grandchildren—Maggie is 11, Robert is 9. I am convinced that if we do not decisively win the struggle over the nature of America, by the time they're my age they will be in a secular atheist country, potentially one dominated by radical Islamists and with no understanding of what it once meant to be an American." He referred to his decision to seek office again, pointing to a 2002 decision by the U.S. Court of Appeals for the Ninth Circuit that the phrase "under God" in the Pledge of Allegiance was unconstitutional, saying, "I had been watching the courts grow steadily more secular and steadily more anti-religious starting with the 1963 school prayer decision. But for some reason this particular decision struck me as so blindingly stupid, so profoundly un-American."

Gingrich has described Sharia as a "mortal threat" and called for federal legislation that would ban its use throughout the United States. During a town hall meeting in South Carolina, after being asked whether he would endorse a Muslim for president, he replied that he would only do so if the person denounced Sharia or refused to impose it on others. In 2016, Gingrich advocated for the mass deportation of all American Muslims who practice Sharia.

Amid controversy surrounding the Park51 mosque envisioned to be built near the World Trade Center site, Gingrich announced his opposition to it, stating, "There should be no mosque near Ground Zero in New York so long as there are no churches or synagogues in Saudi Arabia. The time for double standards that allow Islamists to behave aggressively toward us while they demand our weakness and submission is over." He also said, "We as Americans don't have to tolerate people who are supportive of violence against us, building something at the site of the violence." He compared the construction of Park51 with "putting a Nazi sign next to the Holocaust Museum".

=== Same-sex marriage ===
Although his half-sibling, Candace Gingrich, is an LGBTQ+ rights advocate, Gingrich opposes gay marriage. Speaking in Iowa in 2011, Gingrich said he thinks marriage is between a man and a woman, and told reporters that he "would like to find ways to defend that view as legitimately and effectively as possible". He said that the U.S. government should be defending the Defense of Marriage Act (DOMA). His 2012 campaign website says that he would "nominate conservative judges who are committed to upholding Constitutional limited government and understand that the role of the judges is to interpret the law, not legislate from the bench". Gingrich believes the Republican Party should accept the reality that several states allow same-sex marriage and accept the distinction between "a marriage in a church" and "a legal document issued by the state".

Gingrich had been criticized for opposing same-sex marriage while having been married three times and divorced twice. Representative Barney Frank (D-Mass) said he looks "forward to debating, to take one important example, the Defense of Marriage Act with Mr. Gingrich. I think he is an ideal opponent for us, when we talk about just who it is, is threatening the sanctity of marriage."

=== Space exploration ===
Gingrich is a lifelong astronautics enthusiast; he initially became fascinated with the United States/Soviet Union space race when he was a teenager. As of 2010, he serves on the National Space Society Board of Governors.

Gingrich is an advocate of space exploration technology, and has stated that the United States should place more emphasis on realizing landmark achievements in space exploration. He has been a vocal critic of NASA, which he has described as too bureaucratic, inefficient, and no longer able to foster ambitious projects such as the 1969 Moon landing. He has cited the building of the International Space Station as an example of a program that developed too slowly and was too expensive and the Space Launch System as a pork barrel project. Gingrich advocates greater reliance on the private sector and recommends incentivizing innovation through tax credits and by allocating 10 percent of the Nasa budget for prizes. He also supports initiating federally regulated commercial launch services. According to Gingrich, these changes would allow NASA to focus on advanced technological development and exploratory research. Gingrich's vision for the future of American space programs includes further solar system exploration, space travel for consumers and a sustained civilization beyond earth. He got the nickname of Newt Skywalker for his ideas.

Gingrich advocated the formation of a permanent crewed lunar base by 2020, the presumed end of his 2nd presidential term, and tried to introduce legislation in 1981, the Northwest Ordinance for Space, that would have enabled the Moon colony to become the 51st state upon reaching a population of 13,000 residents. The colony concept was called an "ambitious goal" by Neil deGrasse Tyson who criticized its reliance on the private sector which Tyson describes as unwilling to solely fund such exploratory efforts. Tyson went on to explain that public/private efforts such as NASA partnering with private companies is already happening.

=== State bankruptcy option ===
As an alternative to federal bailouts, Gingrich advocates revising federal law to allow states to voluntarily declare bankruptcy. In a Los Angeles Times opinion article co-written with former Florida Governor Jeb Bush, Gingrich argued such a provision would allow states to reorganize their finances and free them from contractual obligations, specifically with government employee unions. In the op-ed, Gingrich wrote that many government employee pension systems are "bloated, broken and underfunded" and are "perhaps the most significant hurdles for many states trying to restore fiscal health." However, Gingrich also said the new laws must respect the sovereignty of the citizens of a state, as well as limit judicial power over the bankruptcy process.

=== Stem cell research ===
Gingrich supported stem cell research in the past, but now opposes embryonic stem cell research.

=== Taxes ===
Gingrich favors keeping federal and state taxes as low as possible in order to encourage economic growth. He has stated that he believes the corporate tax rate in the United States is too high and inhibits economic growth and job creation. Pointing to emerging competitors such as India and China, which offer lower corporate tax rates than the United States, Gingrich has recommended the U.S. adopt something similar to Ireland's 12.5% corporate income tax. Gingrich opposes efforts by some Democrats to increase taxes on capital gains. Instead he proposes eliminating the capital gains tax entirely, for both individuals and businesses, to increase incentives for entrepreneurship. Gingrich is an opponent of inheritance taxes, referring to current policy as the "death tax", and argues that abolishing the inheritance tax will create "hundreds of thousands" of new jobs. Gingrich also views the estate tax as a form of double taxation.

=== TARP ===
In late 2008, Gingrich voiced his strong opposition to the Troubled Asset Relief Program. He described the $700 billion plan as "socialism" and "just wrong", saying that "it's likely to fail, and it's likely to make the situation worse over time." Gingrich reiterated that the bailout was "essentially wrong" in other appearances on Fox News on September 23 and 24, 2008. Some commentators have speculated that he undercut John McCain by rallying the conservative elements in the House to vote no on the bailout.

On September 29, 2008, Gingrich reversed course and stated that he would "reluctantly and sadly" support the program. He also called for then Treasury Secretary Henry Paulson to resign. He stated, ""The Bush Administration has now provided three case studies in arrogance, isolation, and destructiveness: Michael D. Brown during Hurricane Katrina, Ambassador Jerry Bremer in Baghdad, and Secretary Paulson at Treasury."

== Immigration ==
Gingrich has advanced "a nuanced position" on immigration reform that emphasizes border security and enforcement of immigration laws, as well as expanded immigration and visa programs for law-abiding workers. In a 2006 article in National Review, he called for the formation of "an intelligent center-Right coalition" that "would be for both security and immigration, for accuracy in identity (including a voter card with id and a biometric worker visa card) and patriotic integration of those who want to become American." In January 2011, Gingrich held a forum on Latino issues where he announced a goal to overhaul the country's immigration system so that every worker in the United States is legal within a decade.

Gingrich has argued the first priority for immigration reform is tighter border control. He has pushed for Congress to pass a narrowly written emergency border bill to finish the border fence between the United States and Mexico in less than a year and have complete border control within two years. In addition to greater border control, Gingrich has advocated for measures to discourage the hiring and harboring of illegal immigrants, such as shifting Internal Revenue Service resources to audit companies that employ illegal immigrants and cutting off federal aid to cities, counties or states that refuse to enforce immigration laws. He has frequently argued for using credit card companies to develop identification cards and a real-time system to verify citizenship.

Mr. Gingrich has proposed the building of a fence on the U.S.-Mexican border by Jan. 1, 2014, telling a Tea Party audience it was long overdue, "We won the entire second World War in 44 months, and now in 25 years we can't control the border when the entire Texas side of the border is a river."

Gingrich has been generally opposed to the mass deportation of illegal immigrants, but he has also decried complete amnesty, calling instead for "a humanitarian period of transition as we replace an illegal channel of immigration with a legal one." For example, he advocates using different rules for immigrants who came to the United States as children than those who came as adults, and he has called some parts of the DREAM Act "useful", although he objects to other parts of the bill. He has said the primary targets for deportation should be felons and gang members.

Gingrich supports an expanded temporary worker program, with a special open-ended visa for high value workers. He believes workers who immigrated illegally but have family and a clean criminal record should have first opportunity to get temporary worker visas, but they should be required to return to their country of origin to get the visa.

Gingrich is an advocate of making English the national language of the United States. He supports offering intensive English education to immigrants wishing to learn and has called for requiring immigrants to pass a test on American history in English. He also has said that immigrants should give up the right to vote in other countries to become an American citizen.

Gingrich said in a CNN debate held November 22, 2011 that: "I don't see how the party that says it's the party of the family is going to adopt an immigration policy which destroys families that have been here a quarter century." He also said: "And I'm prepared to take the heat for saying, let's be humane in enforcing the law without giving them citizenship but by finding a way to create legality so that they are not separated from their families."

== Foreign policy ==
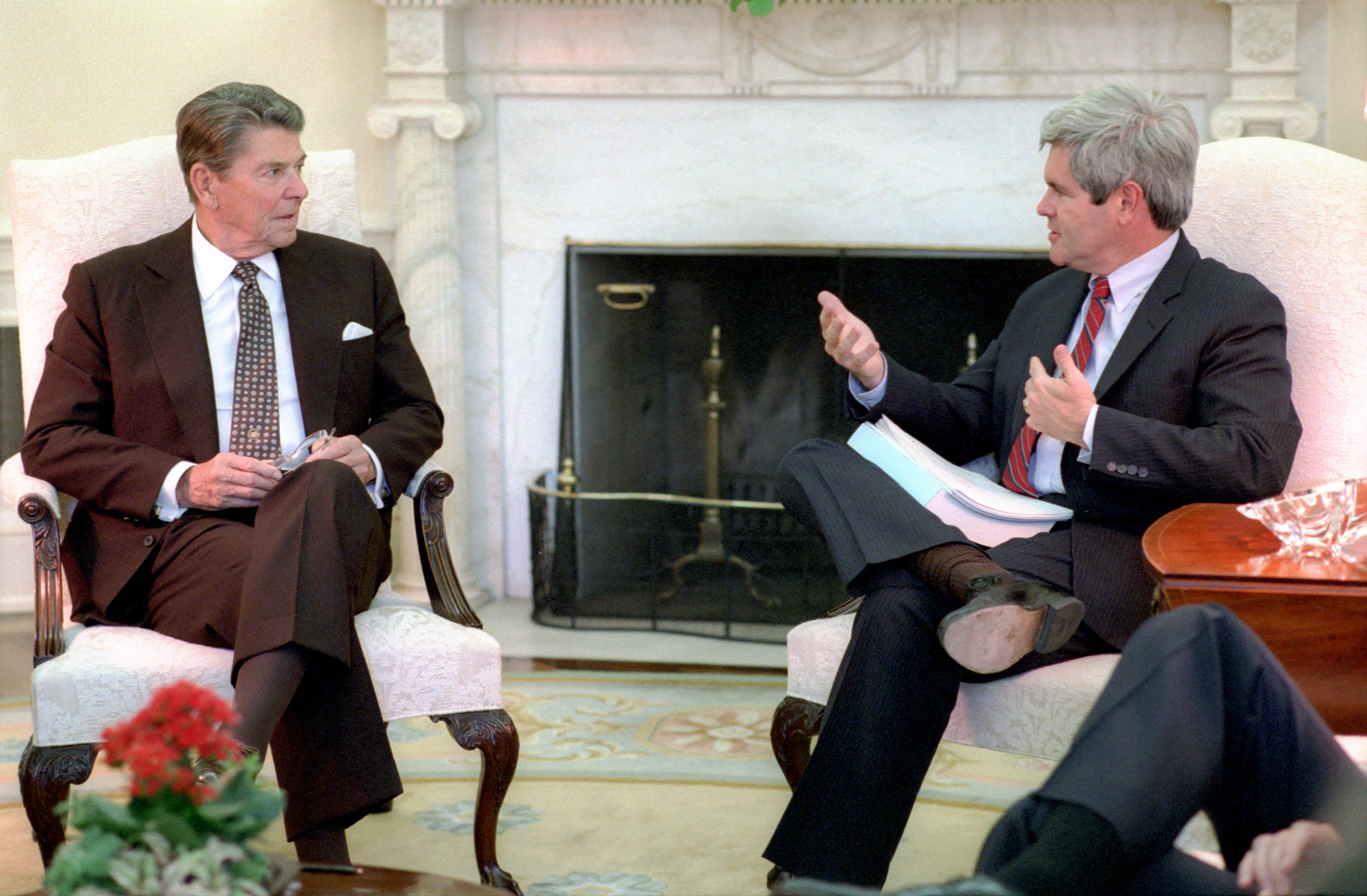
Gingrich and President Ronald Reagan in 1985

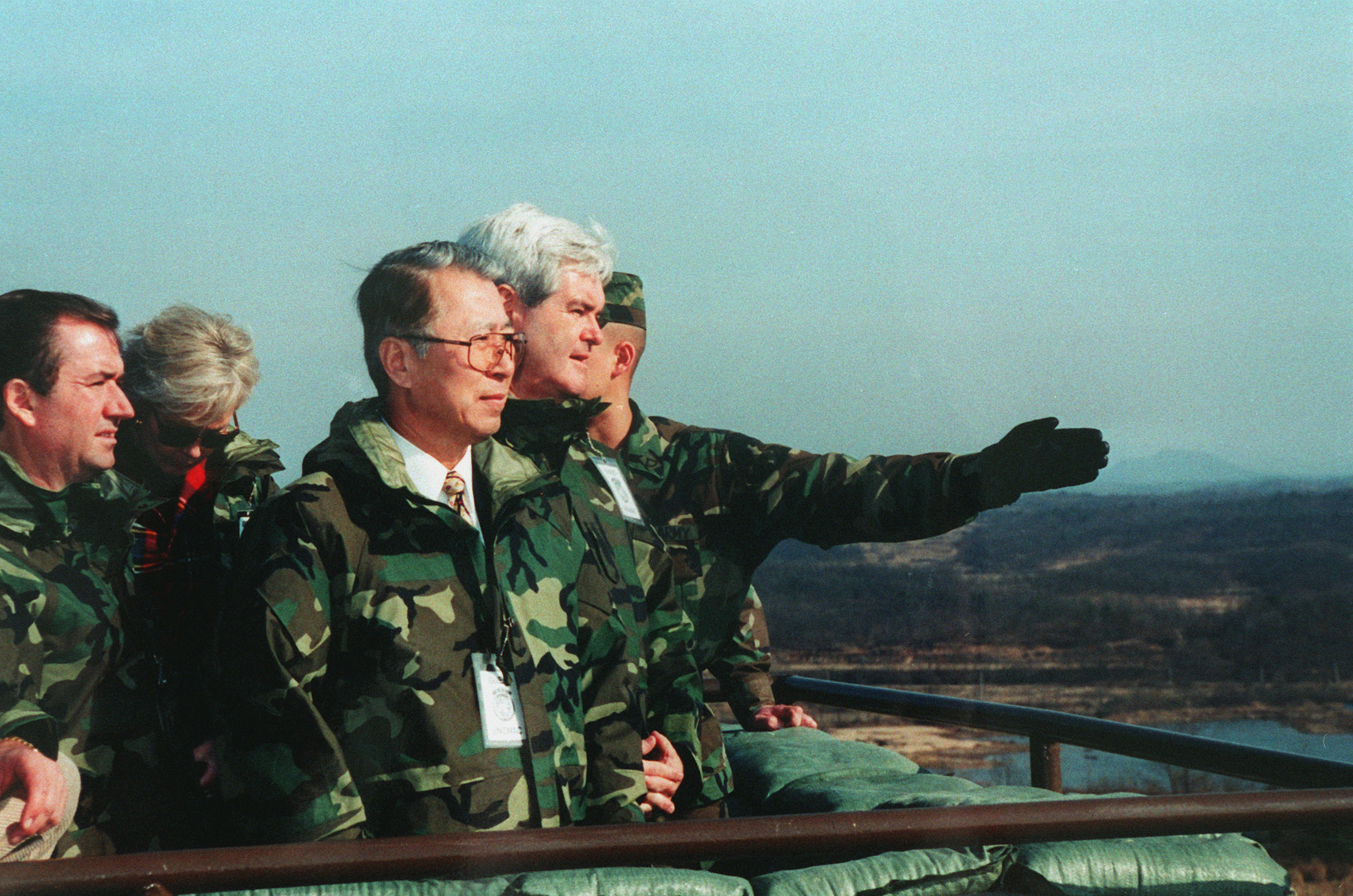
Speaker Newt Gingrich, Congressman Jay Kim and Ed Royce (R-Calif.) face North Korea from the Joint Security Area in 1997

Gingrich has called for a stronger foreign policy, along the lines of the "Reagan model" of toughness", having been critical of the "weakness" of recent administrations' policies. In 2006 Gingrich criticized George W. Bush's stance toward North Korea and Iran, stating that it was "a form of appeasement". He said, "We have accepted the lawyer-diplomatic fantasy that talking while North Korea builds bombs and missiles while the Iranians build bombs and missiles is progress." He has also severely criticized the foreign policy of President Obama for being too weak. Gingrich singled out Obama's responses to terrorism, North Korea, and Iran as particularly problematic. On North Korea he said, "There was amazing symbolism in North Korea deciding to launch a missile the very day President Obama was speaking to Europeans about his fantasy of nuclear disarmament. The West has talked with North Korea for over 15 years and they just keep building nuclear weapons and missiles. We have been talking with the Iranians for a decade and they continue to build nuclear capability and missiles."

=== Middle East ===
==== Afghanistan ====
Gingrich strongly supports the War in Afghanistan even though at times Gingrich has stated that the war in Afghanistan might not end well. Gingrich also stated in June 2011, "There is a radical Islamist war against America and our allies. It would be helpful if President Obama had found time in his speech tonight to explain to the American people how we are going to win this war. Giving a speech in isolation about our military operations in Afghanistan without explaining how it connects with a larger strategy for winning the war against radical Islamists does not help Americans understand what it will take to provide for the security of the American people."

==== Egypt ====
Gingrich has been very critical of Obama's handling of the crisis in Egypt, and has warned of the possibility that Egypt might "go the way of Iran". Gingrich said, "I think this is a period of tremendous challenge and is a sign of the general failure of our strategy of not dealing with radical Islamists and not being honest and aggressive of what's going on around the world." Gingrich also said that the Obama administration had failed to take the Middle East seriously and that Obama's 2009 speech in Cairo designed to improve relations with the Muslim world was a mistake. Gingrich said, "The president went to Cairo and gave his famous speech in which he explained that we should all be friends together because we're all the same people doing the same things and there are no differences between us. Well, I think there are a lot of differences between the Muslim Brotherhood and the rest of us."

==== Iran ====
In a November 2011 presidential candidates' debate, Gingrich "called for replacing the leadership of Iran and said that could be accomplished within a year".

In a 2009 speech to the American Israel Public Affairs Committee (AIPAC), he had called for the withdrawal of funds from Durban II, suspending Iran's right to vote at the United Nations and cutting off supplies of gasoline to Iran in order to force regime change. Gingrich has also said he would "wage real cyber warfare" to initiate a regime change in Iran and would be prepared to use military force, as a last resort, to keep Iran from obtaining a nuclear weapon. At the December 2011 New Hampshire GOP debate, Gingrich said that the idea of a bombing campaign to accurately take out all of Iran's nuclear program is "a fantasy. It would be a gigantic mess, with enormous collateral civilian casualties." Gingrich told the New Hampshire Union Leader in November 2011 that before agreeing to military action, he would first promote covert action and cyber warfare, fund dissident groups and wage economic warfare to effect regime change.

==== Iraq ====
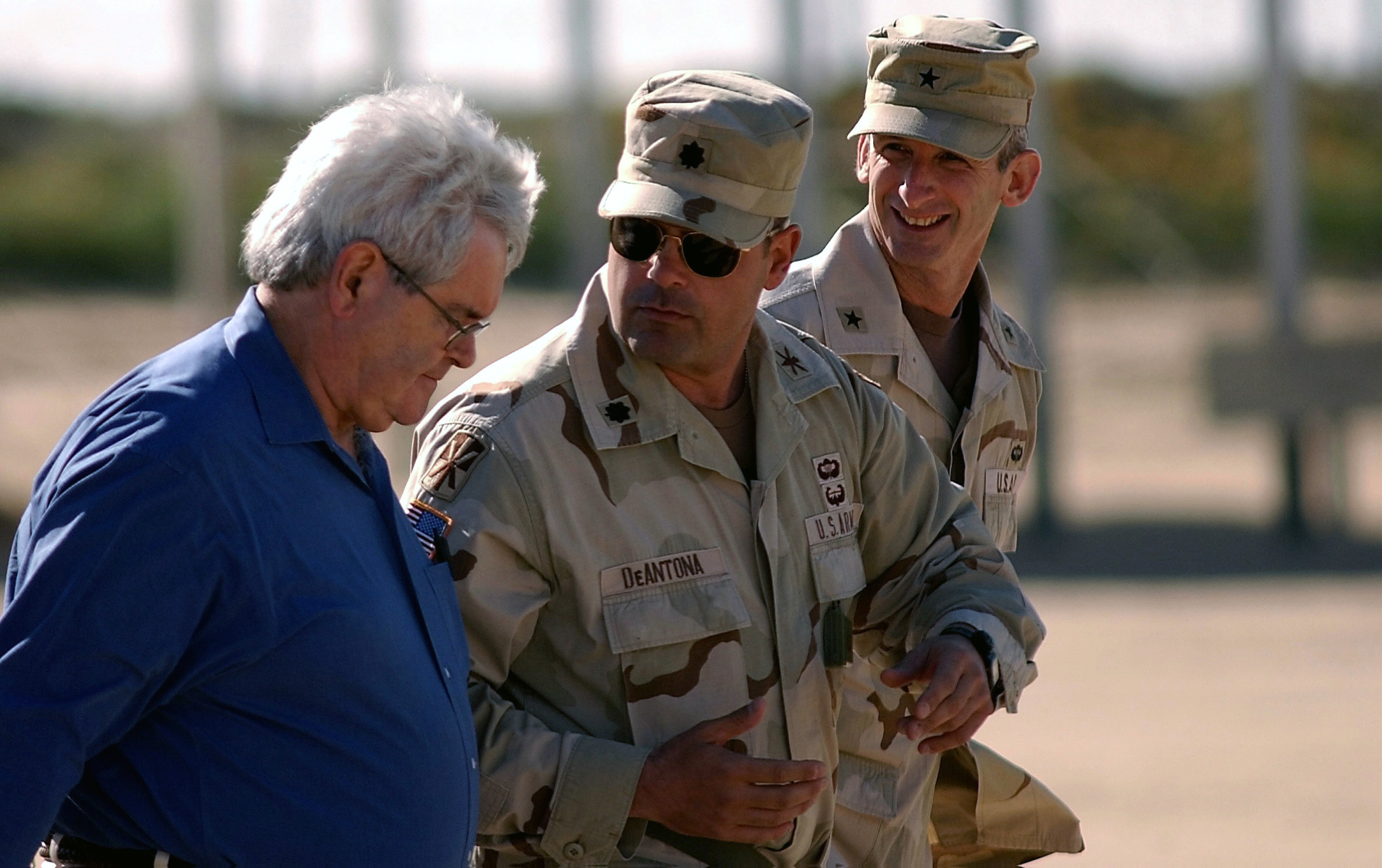
Gingrich tours the Ahmad al-Jaber Air Base in Kuwait, February 6, 2003

Gingrich was supportive of the 2003 invasion of Iraq and the deposition of Saddam Hussein from power. By 2006, Gingrich said the mission in Iraq was "clearly failing" and suggested the size of Iraqi forces be doubled and an "Iraqi Citizen Jobs Corps," in the style of President Franklin D. Roosevelt's Civilian Conservation Corps, be created to stabilize the region.

==== Israel ====
As an informal adviser to the Pentagon in June 2003, Gingrich prepared a six-page memo for Secretary of Defense Donald Rumsfeld. In the document, he outlined "Seven Strategic Necessities" for U.S. policy in the Middle East following the invasion of Iraq. His suggestions included advice on how to approach ongoing conflicts between Israel and the Palestinians, noting that "America does not have a doctrine for total war against an enemy who is hiding behind a civilian population." According to The Washington Post, Rumsfeld "put a small check next to that paragraph". In a 2009 speech to the American Israel Public Affairs Committee (AIPAC), Gingrich called for creating an alternative to Hamas in the Gaza Strip. In a December 2011 interview, Gingrich referred to the Palestinians as "an invented people" and called the Israeli-Palestinian peace process a "delusional" undertaking. He confirmed these statements in the Republican Presidential Debate on December 10, 2011, adding that he considers both Fatah and Hamas to be terrorist organizations. He has also said that there is no Palestinian right of return.

==== Libya ====
During the 2011 Libyan civil war, Gingrich changed his position on U.S. military intervention in Libya, for which he was criticized by some commentators.

On February 24, Gingrich told Fox News' Greta Van Susteren that he supported getting rid of Gaddafi but without military force.

On March 7, however, Gingrich stated that President Obama should "exercise a no-fly zone this evening." On March 23, Gingrich said: "I would not have intervened. I think there were a lot of other ways to affect Gaddafi." In a subsequent statement on Facebook the same day, Gingrich attempted to clarify his remarks, stating that when President Obama publicly declared "it's time for Gaddafi to go" on March 3, he "put the prestige and authority of the United States" on the line and anything short of regime change would have been seen as a defeat for the United States. According to Gingrich, "the President should have moved immediately to consult with Congress to implement a no-fly zone" but instead "wasted weeks trying to get approval from the United Nations instead of Congress" resulting in a change of mission from ousting Gaddafi to one of humanitarian intervention.

=== Promoting democracy ===
In early 2011, Gingrich called for the promotion of democracy around the world, saying that the US should be encouraging countries to renounce dictatorial forms of government. Gingrich has stated he believes that the U.S. should push the message that "America stands for freedom". Gingrich specifically mentioned Egypt, Russia, China, and Cuba as places the United States should be applying pressure. As part of the promotion of democracy, Gingrich has said that he wants to re-think the current model of foreign aid. He says the focus of reform should be on shifting funding and responsibility away from governments and into NGOs. Gingrich has previously argued that government-to-government foreign aid programs are detrimental to the promotion of democracy since they "prop up" repressive governments and allow them to retain control.

=== Use of torture ===
Gingrich's position on the use of torture has changed over time. In 1997, while speaker of the House speaker, Gingrich raised the issue in a meeting with then-Chinese President Jiang Zemin, saying that "Republican leaders made explicitly clear our unwavering commitment to human rights and individual liberty" and that "There is no place for torture and arbitrary detention."

In a January 2009 interview, Gingrich stated: "I am totally opposed to the United States using any form of torture to obtain information as a matter of public policy. Under extraordinary circumstances, the government has a duty to do what it takes to protect Americans, but such cases must be personally authorized by the president."

In an April 2009 television appearance, when asked whether waterboarding was torture, Gingrich said that the question was "debatable" and that "I honestly don't know" the answer. Gingrich stated that however the practice was characterized, waterboarding was "something we shouldn't do" but then stated that there are "very rare circumstances where extreme measures" should be used. In a May 2009 interview, Gingrich said that "waterboarding is not torture" and defended the use of "specific enhanced interrogation techniques in specific circumstances against very high-level terrorists."

In a November 2011 Republican primary debate, Gingrich expressed support for "enhanced interrogation techniques" (a euphemism for torture). At a December 2011 campaign event, Gingrich took the position that waterboarding was technically not torture but that it should be used only at the direction of the president and in extraordinary circumstances.

=== United Nations ===
Gingrich supports the ideals of the United Nations Charter, but believes that the organization itself is deeply corrupt and in need of reform. Gingrich served as co-chair with former senator George Mitchell on the United States Institute of Peace's Task Force on the United Nations, which issued a report calling for the abolition of the current UN Human Rights Commission and replacement with a new Human Rights Council Gingrich sees the main problem at the United Nations being that a large group of developing countries, often referred to as the Group of 77, exploit the "one-country, one-vote" system in attempts to transfer wealth from the world's rich nations to themselves. Gingrich also points to fraud and embezzlement within the UN such as the Oil-for-Food scandal, anti-Western and anti-Israel bias within its human-rights organs, sexual assaults committed by peacekeepers, and a lack of sincere commitment to human rights as major problems that call for reform. Gingrich believes that the United States should spearhead an effort to reform the United Nations. Specifically, he calls for creating an independent oversight body, similar to corporate audit committees, to oversee financial matters, developing a clear-cut definition of terrorism emphasizing that violence against civilians is not acceptable, enhanced sanctions against human-rights violators, and a human rights body with rigorous standards for membership.

=== Ukraine ===
In September 2016 Gingrich stated in an interview to Europeiska Pravda that if Donald Trump won the 2016 US presidential election he would likely lift the ban on supplies of lethal weapons to Ukraine and called the ban "a defeat for the United States." (At the time Ukraine was fighting the War in Donbas.)

== Criticism of Obama administration ==
Gingrich has been a longtime critic of Barack Obama, whom he described as "the most radical president in American history". Gingrich has argued that it is necessary to "save America" and stop Obama's "secular socialist machine". He has characterized the Patient Protection and Affordable Care Act as leading America towards authoritarianism, totalitarianism, and the end of democracy.

Gingrich was criticized in 2010 by Andy Card, George W. Bush's White House chief of staff, for remarks he made during an interview with National Review, in which he said "What if [Obama] is so outside our comprehension, that only if you understand Kenyan, anti-colonial behavior, can you begin to piece together [his actions]? ... That is the most accurate, predictive model for his behavior." Card referred to Gingrich's comments as "not helpful" to Republicans trying to win in the 2010 elections.

In his book To Save America: Stopping Obama's Secular-Socialist Machine, Gingrich said, "The secular socialist machine represents as great a threat to America as Nazi Germany or the Soviet Union once did."

== Relationship with Donald Trump ==
During Gingrich's 2012 presidential campaign, Donald Trump kept it ambiguous whether he would endorse him or Mitt Romney. Trump eventually endorsed Romney.

Transcript of Gingrich offering praise and criticism of Trump during a speech, February 29, 2016

During Trump's 2016 Republican primary campaign, Gingrich was supportive of Trump's candidacy though refrained from giving an outright endorsement, defending him against criticisms from other establishment Republicans. After Trump's primary win in Indiana, Gingrich endorsed Trump and expressed a willingness to serve as his running mate if he were to be selected. CNN described Gingrich as "one of Trump’s most blunt advisers," referencing Gingrich's criticism of Trump's attack on Judge Gonzalo P. Curiel for being biased against him due to his Mexican heritage. Gingrich called Trump's remarks "inexcusable" which led to Trump retorting on how it was "inappropriate" for Gingrich to publicly criticize him. Nevertheless, Gingrich remained a top pick for Trump's running mate, becoming a finalist alongside state governors Mike Pence and Chris Christie. Ultimately, Pence was chosen to be Trump's vice presidential pick, though Gingrich remained a contender for a possible cabinet position, specifically secretary of state, ahead of the general election. After Trump's electoral victory, Gingrich's involvement in the upcoming Trump administration continued to remain in speculation until he officially declined consideration on November 17, 2016.

Following the 2020 election, Gingrich wrote an article for The Washington Times declaring he would not accept Joe Biden as president and how he felt the election wasn't "legitimate or honorable". Ahead of the 2022 midterms, Gingrich and Trump started work on a new "Trumpified" Contract with America (→Project 2025).

In December 2024, Gingrich referred to Trump as a "mythic figure, almost like the various Scandinavian Beowulfs [sic] and other kind of sagas," adding "there is no practical way that you can explain Trump within a normal political structure."
