= List of After Words interviews first aired in 2005 =

After Words is an American television series on the C-SPAN2 network’s weekend programming schedule known as Book TV. The program is an hour-long talk show, each week featuring an interview with the author of a new nonfiction book. The program has no regular host. Instead, each author is paired with a guest host who is familiar with the author or the subject matter of their book.

First air date (Links to video)	Interviewee(s)	Interviewer(s)	Book	Topic of interview / Comments
January 2, 2005	Newt Gingrich	Norman Ornstein	Winning the Future: A 21st Century Contract with America	
January 9, 2005	Howard Friel	Ken Adelman	The Record of the Paper: How the 'New York Times' Misreports U.S. Foreign Policy	The New York Times
January 16, 2005	Helen Prejean	Victoria Toensing	The Death of Innocents: An Eyewitness Account of Wrongful Executions	Wrongful execution
January 23, 2005	Craig Shirley	Joseph Trippi	Reagan's Revolution: The Untold Story of the Campaign That Started It All	Republican Party presidential primaries, 1976, Ronald Reagan
January 30, 2005	Melissa Boyle Mahle	Dana Priest	Denial and Deception: An Insider's View of the CIA From Iran Contra to 9/11	The Central Intelligence Agency
February 6, 2005	Essie Mae Washington-Williams	Harold Ford, Jr.	Dear Senator: A Memoir by the Daughter of Strom Thurmond	Strom Thurmond
February 13, 2005	Natan Sharansky	Tom Gjelten	The Case for Democracy: The Power of Freedom to Overcome Tyranny and Terror	
February 20, 2005	Doug Wead	Harold Gullan	The Raising of a President: The Mothers and Fathers of our Nation's Leaders	
February 27, 2005	William Hague	Martin Turner	William Pitt the Younger	William Pitt the Younger
March 6, 2005	Donald Ritchie	John Dickerson	Reporting from Washington: The History of the Washington Press Corps	
March 13, 2005	Tom Fenton	Roger Mudd	Bad News: The Decline of Reporting, the Business of News, and the Danger to Us All	
March 20, 2005	Ari Fleischer	Karen Hosler	Taking Heat: The President, the Press, and My Years in the White House	
March 27, 2005	Jim Wallis	Randy Tate	God's Politics: Why the Right Gets It Wrong and the Left Doesn't Get It	
April 3, 2005	Roy Moore	Bill Press	So Help Me God: The Ten Commandments, Judicial Tyranny, and the Battle for Religious Freedom	Glassroth v. Moore
April 10, 2005	Ernestine Bradley	Hadassah Lieberman	The Way Home: A German Childhood, an American Life	
April 17, 2005	Bob Dole	Rick Atkinson	One Soldier's Story: A Memoir	
April 24, 2005	Jorge Ramos	Linda Chavez	Dying to Cross: The Worst Immigrant Tragedy in American History	
May 1, 2005	Linda Greenhouse	Tim O'Brien	Becoming Justice Blackmun: Harry Blackmun's Supreme Court Journey	Harry Blackmun
May 8, 2005	Byron York	Clarence Page	The Vast Left Wing Conspiracy: The Untold Story of How Democratic Operatives, Eccentric Billionaires, Liberal Activists, and Assorted Celebrities Tried to Bring Down a President--and Why They'll Try Even Harder Next Time	
May 15, 2005	Michael Eric Dyson	Debra Dickerson	Is Bill Cosby Right: Or Has the Black Middle Class Lost Its Mind?	
May 22, 2005	Ronald Radosh	Jack Valenti	Red Star Over Hollywood: The Film Colony's Long Romance with the Left	
May 29, 2005	Jack Coughlin	Tony Capaccio	Shooter: The Autobiography of the Top-Ranked Marine Sniper	
June 5, 2005	Zell Miller	John Anderson	A Deficit of Decency	
June 12, 2005	Patricia O'Toole	Tom Daschle	When Trumpets Call: Theodore Roosevelt after the White House	Theodore Roosevelt
June 19, 2005	Neil Baldwin	Joseph Bottum	The American Revelation: Ten Ideals That Shaped Our Country from the Puritans to the Cold War	
June 26, 2005	David Rothkopf	James Bamford	Running the World: The Inside Story of the National Security Council and the Architects of American Power	United States National Security Council
July 3, 2005	Robert W. Merry	Harlan Ullman	Sands of Empire: Missionary Zeal, American Foreign Policy, and the Hazards of Global Ambition	
July 10, 2005	Bob Woodward	James Mann	The Secret Man: The Story of Watergate's Deep Throat	Mark Felt, Deep Throat
July 17, 2005	Victor Navasky	David Frum	A Matter of Opinion	
July 24, 2005	Asra Nomani	Akbar Ahmed	Standing Alone in Mecca: An American Woman's Struggle for the Soul of Islam	
July 31, 2005	Rick Santorum	Kirk Victor	It Takes a Family: Conservatism and the Common Good	
August 7, 2005	Kenneth Walsh	Susan Eisenhower	From Mount Vernon to Crawford: A History of the Presidents and Their Retreats	
August 14, 2005	Harvey Kaye	Michael Novak	Thomas Paine and the Promise of America	Thomas Paine
August 21, 2005	Ralph Peters	Anatol Lieven	New Glory: Expanding America's Global Supremacy	
August 28, 2005	Sheldon Hackney	Janet Langhart Cohen	Magnolias Without Moonlight: The American South from Regional Confederacy to National Integration	History of the Southern United States, Politics of the Southern United States
September 3, 2005	Charles Peters	Thomas Fleming	Five Days in Philadelphia: The Amazing 'We Want Willkie!' Convention of 1940 and How It Freed FDR to Save the Western World	1940 Republican National Convention
September 10, 2005	Barbara Ehrenreich	Stephen Moore	Bait and Switch: The (Futile) Pursuit of the American Dream	
September 17, 2005	Steve Forbes	Alice Rivlin	Flat Tax Revolution: Using a Postcard to Abolish the IRS	Flat tax
September 24, 2005	Tony Blankley	Barbara Slavin	The West's Last Chance: Will We Win the Clash of Civilizations?	
October 1, 2005	Andrea Mitchell	Robert Lichter	Talking Back: ...to Presidents, Dictators, and Assorted Scoundrels	
October 8, 2005	Chris Whittle	Jay Mathews	Crash Course: Imagining a Better Future for Public Education	
October 15, 2005	Bing West	Mark Mazzetti	No True Glory: A Frontline Account of the Battle for Fallujah	Second Battle of Fallujah
October 22, 2005	Mary Frances Berry	Juan Williams	My Face Is Black Is True: Callie House and the Struggle for Ex-Slave Reparations	Callie House
October 29, 2005	Thomas P.M. Barnett	Tom Feeney	Blueprint for Action: A Future Worth Creating	
November 6, 2005	Jimmy Carter	Brian Williams	Our Endangered Values: America's Moral Crisis	
November 12, 2005	Bill Richardson	Chuck Todd	Between Worlds: The Making of an American Life	
November 19, 2005	Nathaniel Fick	Andrew Carroll	One Bullet Away: The Making of a Marine Officer	United States Marine Corps
November 26, 2005	Bruce Chadwick	Edward Lengel	The First American Army: The Untold Story of George Washington and the Men Behind America's First Fight for Freedom	George Washington
December 3, 2005	Mary Mapes	Brent Bozell	Truth and Duty: The Press, the President, and the Privilege of Power	Killian documents controversy
December 10, 2005	Haynes Johnson	Joseph diGenova	The Age of Anxiety: McCarthyism to Terrorism	
December 17th, 2005	John Linder	David Wessel	The FairTax Book	FairTax
December 24, 2005	George Weigel	Jon Meacham	God's Choice: Pope Benedict XVI and the Future of the Catholic Church	Pope Benedict XVI
December 31, 2005	Janis Karpinski	Douglas Macgregor	One Woman's Army: The Commanding General of Abu Ghraib Tells Her Story	Abu Ghraib torture and prisoner abuse
