= Robert Bennett =

Robert or Bob Bennett may refer to:

== Arts and entertainment ==
=== Music ===
- Robert Russell Bennett (1894–1981), American composer
- Bobby Bennett (The Famous Flames) (1938–2013), member of James Brown's singing group The Famous Flames
- Bob Bennett, drummer for The Sonics
- Bob Bennett (singer-songwriter) (born 1955), Christian music vocalist and acoustic guitarist
- Bobby Bennett, Jr. (born 1986), contestant on season 5 of American Idol

=== Writing ===
- Robert Bennet (theologian) or Bennett (died 1687), English author
- Robert Jackson Bennett (born 1984), American author

== Politics ==
- Robert Bennett (Melbourne mayor) (1822–1891), mayor of Melbourne, 1861–1862
- Robert Frederick Bennett (1927–2000), governor of Kansas, 1975–1979
- Robert H. Bennett (1913–1991), member of the Alabama House of Representatives
- Bob Bennett (politician) (1933–2016), U.S. senator from Utah, 1993–2011
- Robert T. Bennett (1939–2014), chairman of the Ohio Republican Party

== Sports ==
- Robert Bennett (athlete) (1919–1974), 1948 Olympic bronze medalist in hammer throw
- Bob Bennett (swimmer) (born 1943), 1960 and 1964 Olympic bronze medalist in swimming
- Bob Bennett (baseball) (1933–2020), American college baseball coach
- Robert Bennett (cricketer) (1831–1875), English cricketer
- Bob Bennett (rugby league), Australian player and coach
- Bob Bennett (cricketer) (born 1940), former English cricketer
- Bobby Bennett (footballer) (born 1951), English footballer

== Others ==
- Robert A. Bennett (born 1941), American business journalist
- Robert R. Bennett (born 1958), American businessman
- Robert L. Bennett (1912–2002), Native American lawyer and official with the Bureau of Indian Affairs
- Robert S. Bennett (1939–2023), President Bill Clinton's attorney
- Robert W. Bennett (born 1941), American legal scholar and former dean of Northwestern University School of Law
- Bob Bennett (bishop) (1949–2025), Canadian Anglican bishop
- Robert David Bennett (1875–1932), Australian criminal and sex offender
- Robert Bennett (geographer) (born 1948), British geographer

== See also ==
- Robert Bennet (disambiguation)
- Robert Benet, English Protestant martyr
