= National Popular Vote =

National Popular Vote may refer to:

- National Popular Vote Interstate Compact, an Electoral College reform proposal adopted or being considered by the legislatures of the several U.S. states plus the District of Columbia
- National Popular Vote Inc., a non-profit group which promotes the National Popular Vote Interstate Compact
