= Every Vote Equal =

2006 book

- Author: John R. Koza, Barry Fadem, Mark Grueskin, Michael S. Mandell, Robert Richie, Joseph F. Zimmerman
- Publisher: National Popular Vote Press
- Publication date: December 2006
- Media type: Paperback
- Pages: 620
- ISBN: 978-0-9790107-0-5
- OCLC: 65432021

Every Vote Equal is a 2006 book addressing the rationales, strategies, and legal and administrative issues associated with the National Popular Vote Interstate Compact. It was made available online by National Popular Vote Inc. for free.

It includes forwards by John B. Anderson, Birch Bayh, John Buchanan and Tom Campbell.
