= Robert Bennet =

Robert Bennet may refer to:

- Robert Bennet (bishop) (died 1617), English bishop
- Robert Bennet of Chesters, Scottish gentleman and prisoner on the Bass Rock
- Robert Bennet (surveyor) (fl. 1621–1622), English surveyor and politician
- Robert Bennet (Roundhead) (1605–1683), English politician
- Robert Bennet (theologian) (died 1687), English theologian and writer
- Robert Ames Bennet (1870–1954), American western and science fiction writer
- Bob Bennet (1879–1962), New Zealand rugby union player

== See also ==
- Robert Bennett (disambiguation)
