= 2020 Colorado Proposition 113 =

Proposition 113
- National Popular Vote Interstate Compact Referendum

Results
Choice	Votes	%
Yes	1,644,716	52.33%
No	1,498,500	47.67%
Valid votes	3,143,216	95.37%
Invalid or blank votes	152,450	4.63%
Total votes	3,295,666	100.00%
Registered voters/turnout	3,793,790	86.87%

For
80–90%
70%–80%
60%–70%
50%–60%
Against
90–100%
80–90%
70–80%
60–70%
50–60%
Other
Tie
No data

2020 Colorado Proposition 113 was a ballot initiative approved by voters in Colorado as part of the November 3, 2020 United States elections. The proposition was to join the National Popular Vote Interstate Compact.

== Contents ==
The proposal appeared on the ballot as follows:

Adopt Agreement to Elect U.S. President By National Popular Vote

Shall the following Act of the General Assembly be approved: An Act concerning adoption of an agreement among the states to elect the President of the United States by national popular vote, being Senate Bill No.19-042?

== Polling ==
Poll source	Date(s) administered	Sample size (Note: Key: A – all adults RV – registered voters LV – likely voters V – unclear)	Margin of error	For Proposition 113	Against Proposition 113	Undecided
Civiqs/Daily Kos	October 11–14, 2020	1,013 (LV)	± 3.6%	47%	45%	8%
YouGov/University of Colorado	October 5–9, 2020	800 (LV)	± 4.64%	49%	34%	17%
SurveyUSA/9News/Colorado Politics	October 1–6, 2020	1,021 (LV)	± 3.9%	39%	38%	23%

== Results ==
Proposition 113
Choice	Votes	%
For	1,644,716	52.33
Against	1,498,500	47.67
Total	3,143,216	100.00
Registered voters/turnout	3,793,790	86.87

The proposal was approved narrowly, with around 52% of the vote. The results of the proposal were highly correlated with the results of the concurrent presidential election. Every county that voted for Donald Trump voted against the proposal, and all but two counties that voted for Joe Biden voted for the proposal.

== See also ==
- List of Colorado ballot measures
