= Tipping-point state =

Concept in US presidential elections

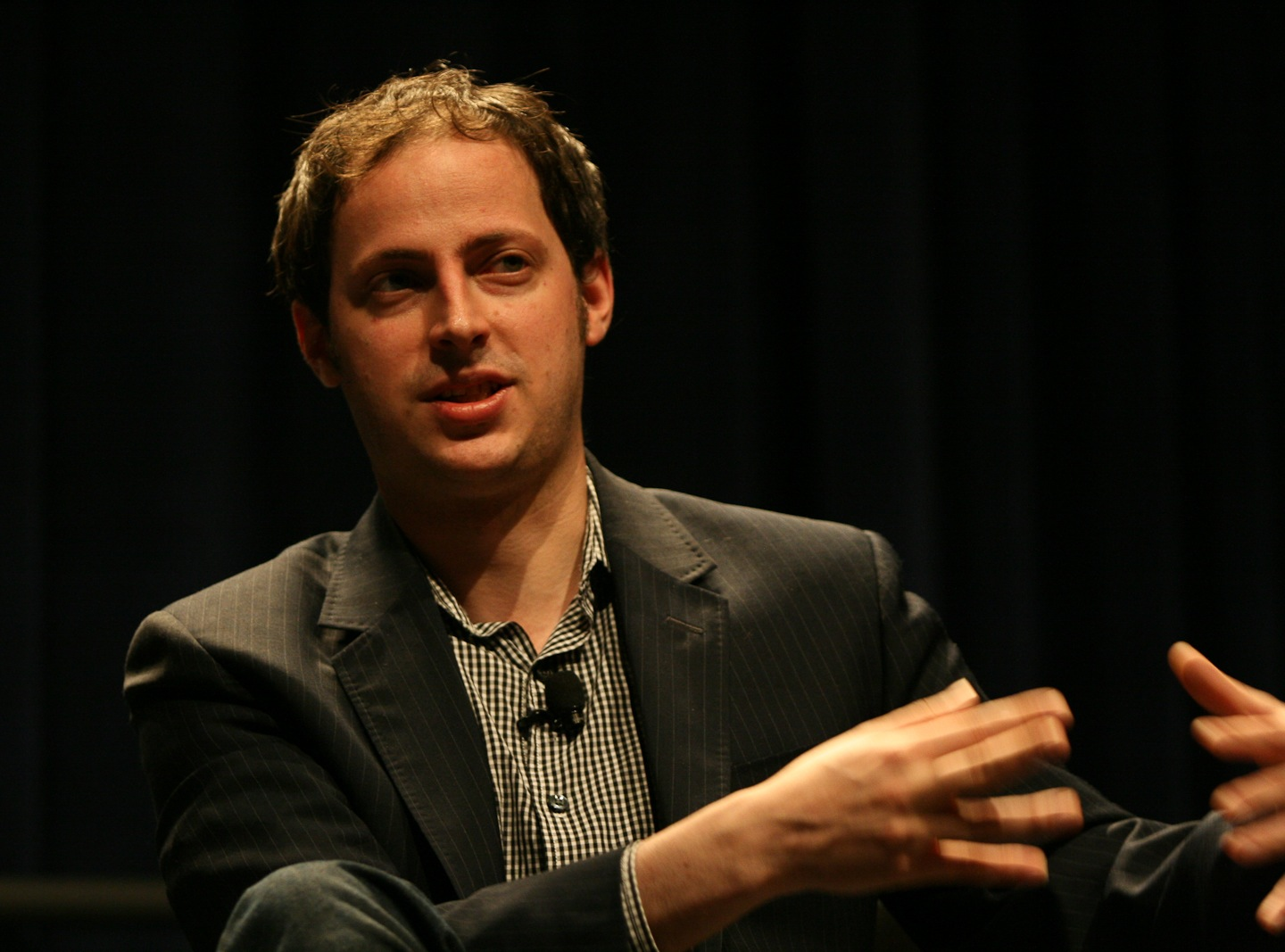
The concept of tipping-point states was popularized by Nate Silver.

"Tipping-point state" is used to analyze the median state of a United States presidential election. In a list of states ordered by decreasing margin of victory for the winning candidate, the tipping point state is the first state where the combined electoral votes of all states up to that point in the list give the winning candidate a majority in the Electoral College.

The idea of a "tipping-point state" can be interpreted as suggesting a counterfactual, on the assumption that outcomes in different states are strongly correlated: if the nationwide vote margin were shifted, but the order of states by vote margin were unchanged, the tipping-point state would be the state or states in which a change in the state winner would result in a change in the national winner. The term may also refer to the state that would give the second-place candidate a majority of the electoral vote when all states are arranged in order of their vote margins; this is typically, but not always, the same state as in the primary definition.

Since the number of electors was set to 538 for the 1964 United States presidential election, 270 electoral votes have been required to win the Electoral College. In some elections, there can be multiple tipping-point states for different candidates: if no candidate receives 270 electoral votes, a contingent election is required in the United States House of Representatives. For example, in the 2020 United States presidential election, if Donald Trump had won Wisconsin, Arizona and Georgia, the electoral college would have been tied 269–269: thus, Wisconsin was the tipping-point state for a Biden victory, whereas Pennsylvania, the next-closest, was the tipping-point state for a Trump victory.

== Origin ==
The concept of a tipping-point state was popularized by FiveThirtyEight's Nate Silver. FiveThirtyEight regularly predicts which state will be the tipping-point state in a given presidential election through the site's "Tipping Point Index". Past predictions of tipping-point states include either Michigan or Ohio in the 2008 election, Ohio in the 2012 election, Florida in the 2016 election, and Pennsylvania in the 2020 election.

Because a majority of the electoral vote is required in order to clinch the presidential election in the Electoral College, (Note: If no individual wins a majority of the electoral vote, the U.S. House of Representatives determines the winner in a contingent election.) the tipping-point state for the first-place finisher and the second-place finisher may differ if more than two candidates received electoral votes, or if a shift in the states would leave the electoral vote tied. Tipping-point states may also differ depending on the disposition of faithless electors, on the assumption that certain faithless electors may have chosen to give their vote to the candidate they had pledged to vote for if their vote would have given that candidate a majority of the vote. Because electoral votes are awarded to winners of Washington, D.C. and certain congressional districts, (Note: Nebraska and Maine award two electoral votes to the statewide winner and award the remainder of their electoral votes based on the winner of each congressional district. Since the 1832 presidential election, the vast majority of states have awarded all of their respective electoral votes to the statewide winner, but various methods have been used historically. In some cases, such as the 1860 United States presidential election in New York, parties have formed fusion tickets in which they agreed to split a state's electoral vote if they won the state.) it is possible for the tipping-point to be something other than a state.

The tipping-point state is not related to the chronological order in which state-by-state election results are reported, either by media outlets or by state officials. Rather, the media uses decision desks to project the apparent winners of each state before all the votes are counted, and will announce a state that they project will give a candidate enough electoral votes to become the apparent presidential winner. The tipping-point state can only be determined after all the votes in each state are counted and certified, and thus all the vote margins are accurate. For example, the projection of Joe Biden to have won the state of Pennsylvania in the 2020 election made him the projected winner of the electoral college, but for Biden the tipping point state of the 2020 election was Wisconsin, which was called for him three days prior.

== Example: 2012 presidential election ==
2012 Electoral College result.

=== Obama victory tipping point state ===
In the 2012 presidential election, Barack Obama defeated Mitt Romney in the electoral vote, taking 332 electoral votes compared to 206 for Romney. As with all presidential elections since the 1964 election, 270 electoral votes were needed to win a majority in the Electoral College. Obama would still have won a majority of the electoral vote even if he did not win Florida, Ohio, and Virginia, the three states in which he had his smallest margin of victory. However, if Obama had lost those three states as well as Colorado (where he recorded his fourth-smallest margin of victory), he would not have won a majority of the Electoral College. Thus, Colorado was the tipping point state for an Obama victory in 2012.

2012 presidential election tipping-point state
State			Cumulative Obama electoral vote
State	Obama margin	Electoral votes	Cumulative Obama electoral vote
19 states + D.C. (Note: 19 states and Washington D.C. voted for Obama by a margin of at least 6 percent in 2012.)	>6%	233	233
Iowa	5.81%	6	239
New Hampshire	5.58%	4	243
Pennsylvania	5.38%	20	263
Colorado	5.36%	9	272
Virginia	3.88%	13	285
Ohio	2.98%	18	303
Florida	0.88%	29	332
24 states (Note: 24 states voted for Romney in 2012.)	<0%	206	—N/a

== List of tipping-point states by election ==
This table shows the tipping point state for the winning candidate in each presidential election since 1832, without any reassignment of faithless electors.

Election	State	State margin (Note: The margin by which the winning candidate won the tipping point state.)	National margin (Note: The margin by which the winning candidate won the national popular vote.)	Margin difference (Note: The tipping-point state margin subtracted by the national popular vote margin.)	Winning candidate
1832	Maine (Note: Because third party candidates John Floyd and William Wirt each won several electoral votes, Pennsylvania was the tipping point state for a Henry Clay victory.)	10.7%	16.8%	-6.1%	Andrew Jackson (D)
1836	Pennsylvania (Note: Because Hugh Lawson White, Daniel Webster, and Willie Person Mangum each won several electoral votes, and because William Henry Harrison did not appear on the ballot of every state, New York was the tipping point state for a Harrison victory.)	2.4%	14.2%	-11.8%	Martin Van Buren (D)
1840	New Jersey	3.6%	6.1%	-2.5%	William Henry Harrison (W)
1844	New York	1.1%	1.5%	-0.4%	James K. Polk (D)
1848	Pennsylvania	3.6%	4.8%	-1.2%	Zachary Taylor (W)
1852	New York	5.2%	7.0%	-1.8%	Franklin Pierce (D)
1856	Tennessee (Note: Because Millard Fillmore won several electoral votes, and because John C. Fremont did not appear on the ballot of every state, Pennsylvania was the tipping point state for a Fremont victory.)	4.4%	12.2%	-7.8%	James Buchanan (D)
1860	New York	7.4%	10.1%	-2.7%	Abraham Lincoln (R)
1864	Illinois	8.8%	10.1%	-1.3%	Abraham Lincoln (R) (Note: Hoping to rally War Democrats and other unionists during the American Civil War, the Republican Party campaigned as the National Union Party in the 1864 election.)
1868	North Carolina (Note: Arkansas was the tipping point state for a victory by Horatio Seymour.)	6.8%	5.3%	1.5%	Ulysses S. Grant (R)
1872	Ohio (Note: Congress voted to reject the electoral votes of Arkansas and Louisiana on the grounds of election irregularities. If the presidential electors of those states had been accepted by Congress, New Hampshire would have been the tipping point state.)	7.1%	11.8%	-4.7%	Ulysses S. Grant (R)
1876	South Carolina	0.5%	-3%	3.5%	Rutherford B. Hayes (R)
1880	New York	1.9%	0.1%	1.8%	James A. Garfield (R)
1884	New York	0.1%	0.6%	-0.5%	Grover Cleveland (D)
1888	New York	1.1%	-0.8%	1.9%	Benjamin Harrison (R)
1892	Illinois	3.1%	3%	-0.1%	Grover Cleveland (D)
1896	Ohio	4.8%	4.3%	0.5%	William McKinley (R)
1900	Illinois	8.4%	6.1%	2.3%	William McKinley (R)
1904	New Jersey	18.6%	18.8%	-0.2%	Theodore Roosevelt (R)
1908	West Virginia	10.3%	8.5%	1.8%	William Howard Taft (R)
1912	New York (Note: Ohio was the tipping point state for a victory by Theodore Roosevelt.)	12.6%	14.4%	-1.8%	Woodrow Wilson (D)
1916	California	0.4%	3.1%	-2.7%	Woodrow Wilson (D)
1920	Rhode Island	31.2%	26.2%	5.0%	Warren G. Harding (R)
1924	Nebraska	17.5%	25.2%	-7.7%	Calvin Coolidge (R)
1928	Illinois	14.7%	17.4%	-2.7%	Herbert Hoover (R)
1932	Iowa	17.7%	17.8%	-0.1%	Franklin D. Roosevelt (D)
1936	Ohio	20.1%	24.3%	-4.2%	Franklin D. Roosevelt (D)
1940	Pennsylvania	6.9%	10%	-3.1%	Franklin D. Roosevelt (D)
1944	New York	5%	7.5%	-2.5%	Franklin D. Roosevelt (D)
1948	California (Note: Because third party candidate Strom Thurmond won 39 electoral votes, Illinois was the tipping point state for a victory by Thomas Dewey.)	0.4%	4.5%	-4.1%	Harry S. Truman (D)
1952	Michigan	11.5%	10.9%	0.6%	Dwight D. Eisenhower (R)
1956	Florida	14.5%	15.4%	-0.9%	Dwight D. Eisenhower (R)
1960	Missouri (Note: In 1960, because of unpledged electors who cast their votes for Harry F. Byrd, New Jersey was the tipping point state for a Nixon victory.)	0.5%	0.2%	0.3%	John F. Kennedy (D)
1964	Washington	24.6%	22.3%	2.3%	Lyndon B. Johnson (D)
1968	Ohio (Note: Because third party candidate George Wallace won several electoral votes, Illinois was the tipping point state for a victory by Hubert Humphrey.)	2.3%	0.7%	1.6%	Richard Nixon (R)
1972	Ohio (Note: Because of a faithless elector, Maine was the tipping point state for a George McGovern victory.)	21.6%	23.2%	-1.6%	Richard Nixon (R)
1976	Wisconsin	1.7%	2.1%	-0.4%	Jimmy Carter (D)
1980	Illinois	7.9%	9.7%	-1.8%	Ronald Reagan (R)
1984	Michigan	19%	18.2%	0.8%	Ronald Reagan (R)
1988	Michigan	7.9%	7.7%	0.2%	George H. W. Bush (R)
1992	Tennessee	4.7%	5.6%	-0.9%	Bill Clinton (D)
1996	Pennsylvania	9.2%	8.5%	0.7%	Bill Clinton (D)
2000	Florida	0.0% (Note: George W. Bush won Florida by 0.0092% in the 2000 presidential election.)	-0.5%	0.5%	George W. Bush (R)
2004	Ohio	2.1%	2.5%	-0.4%	George W. Bush (R)
2008	Colorado (Note: Broke a possible tie in the Electoral College. As a result, Iowa was the tipping point state for a John McCain victory.)	9.0%	7.3%	1.7%	Barack Obama (D)
2012	Colorado	5.4%	3.9%	1.5%	Barack Obama (D)
2016	Pennsylvania (Note: Without assigning faithless electors to the winners of their respective states, Pennsylvania was the tipping point state for a Trump victory. Wisconsin was the tipping point state for a Hillary Clinton victory, and was also the tipping point state for a Trump victory if faithless electors are assigned to the winners of their respective states.)	0.7%	-2.1%	2.8%	Donald Trump (R)
2020	Wisconsin (Note: Broke a possible tie in the Electoral College. As a result, Pennsylvania was the tipping point state for a Donald Trump victory.)	0.6%	4.4%	-3.8%	Joe Biden (D)
2024	Pennsylvania	1.7%	1.5%	0.2%	Donald Trump (R)

=== Tipping-point states by frequency ===
The following 20 states have been the tipping-point state for the winning candidate (without accounting for any change in the disposition of faithless electors) beginning with the 1832 election:

Times	State(s)
8	New York
6	Ohio, Pennsylvania
5	Illinois
3	Michigan
2	California, Colorado, Florida, New Jersey, Tennessee, Wisconsin
1	Iowa, Maine, Missouri, Nebraska, North Carolina, Rhode Island, South Carolina, Washington, West Virginia
