= Robert A. Bennett =

American journalist

Robert Bennett
- Born: 1941 (age 84–85)
- Occupation: Journalist

Robert A. Bennett (born 1941) is an American banking and finance journalist.

== Background ==
Robert Bennett has worked for The New York Times and U.S. Banker (also previously known as United States Banker). Bennett wrote for The New York Times between 1977–1989, most in his official capacity as the newspaper's Banking Correspondent (1979–1988).

Later, Bennett served as Editor of U.S. Banker from 1988 to 1992 and then, as Editor-in-Chief from 2000-2002. He left U.S. Banker in 1988, while the Publisher, Andrew L. Goodenough, called Bennett, "the nation's premier banking editor." Goodenough described Bennett's reach in the financial world: "Robert A. Bennett is known personally by most of the nation's financial institution leaders; the rest most certainly know him by name and reputation. His byline has been seen by every business leader in New York, across the country, and even the world."

Bennett also wrote and worked for other financial publications, including American Banker and The Bond Buyer.
