= National Popular Vote Interstate Compact =

U.S. agreement on presidential elections

- Status as of September 2026: Each square in the cartogram represents one electoral vote.: Enacted – 222 EVs (41.3% of Electoral College); Pending – 19 EVs (3.5%); Neither enacted nor pending – 297 EVs (55.2%); | Threshold for activation – 270 EVs (50% plus one)
- Drafted: January 2006
- Effective: Not in effect
- Condition: Adoption by states (and D.C.) whose electoral votes constitute a majority in the Electoral College. The agreement is binding only where adopted.
- Signatories: List: Maryland; New Jersey; Illinois; Hawaii; Washington; Massachusetts; District of Columbia; Vermont; California; Rhode Island; New York; Connecticut; Colorado; Delaware; New Mexico; Oregon; Minnesota; Maine; Virginia

Full text
- Agreement Among the States to Elect the President by National Popular Vote at Wikisource

The National Popular Vote Interstate Compact (NPVIC) is an agreement among a group of U.S. states and the District of Columbia to award all their electoral votes to whichever presidential ticket wins the overall popular vote in the 50 states and the District of Columbia, regardless of which ticket won more votes in their individual state/district. Introduced in 2006, the compact is designed to ensure that the candidate who receives the most votes nationwide is elected president, and it would come into effect only when it would guarantee that outcome.

It has been joined by eighteen states and the District of Columbia as of September 2026. They have 222 electoral votes, which is 41% of the Electoral College and 82% of the 270 votes needed to give the compact legal force. The idea gained traction amongst scholars after George W. Bush won the presidential election but lost the popular vote in 2000, the first time the winner of the presidency had lost the popular vote since 1888. The compact gained even more momentum when Donald Trump won the presidential election in 2016, despite having received nearly three million fewer votes than his rival, Hillary Clinton. The November 2026 elections increased the prospect of the compact entering force in the near term, due to changes in the partisanship of certain state legislatures and governorships.

Some legal questions may affect implementation of the compact. Some legal observers believe states have plenary power to appoint electors as prescribed by the compact. The authors of the compact argue that Article II, Section 1, Clause 2 of the United States Constitution allow states to cast their electoral votes in whatever manner their state legislatures deem appropriate. Others believe that the compact will require congressional consent under the Constitution's Compact Clause or that the presidential election process cannot be altered except by a constitutional amendment.

== Mechanism ==
Taking the form of an interstate compact, the agreement would go into effect among participating states only after they collectively represent an absolute majority of votes (at least 270) in the Electoral College. Once in effect, in each presidential election the participating states would award all of their electoral votes to the candidate with the largest national popular vote total across the 50 states and the District of Columbia. As a result, that candidate would win the presidency by securing a majority of votes in the Electoral College. Until the compact's conditions are met, all states award electoral votes in their current manner.

The compact would modify the way participating states implement Article II, Section 1, Clause 2 of the U.S. Constitution, which requires each state legislature to define a method to appoint its electors to vote in the Electoral College. The Constitution does not mandate any particular legislative scheme for selecting electors, and instead vests state legislatures with the exclusive power to choose how to allocate their states' electors (although systems that violate the 14th Amendment, which mandates equal protection of the law and prohibits racial discrimination, are prohibited). States have chosen various methods of allocation over the years, with regular changes in the nation's early decades. Today, all but two states (Maine and Nebraska) award all their electoral votes to the single candidate with the most votes statewide (the "winner-take-all" system). (Note: Maine and Nebraska currently award one electoral vote to the winner in each congressional district and their remaining two electoral votes to the statewide winner. In addition, because Maine uses ranked choice voting in its presidential elections, its certified popular vote count will be from the final result of a series of instant runoffs that continue until only two presidential slates remain.)

The compact would no longer be in effect should the total number of electoral votes held by the participating states fall below the threshold required, which could occur due to withdrawal of one or more states, changes due to the decennial congressional re-apportionment, or an increase in the size of Congress, for example by admittance of a 51st state. The compact mandates a July 20 deadline in presidential election years, six months before Inauguration Day, to determine whether the agreement is in effect for that particular election. Any withdrawal by a state after that deadline will not be considered effective by other participating states until the next president is confirmed.

== Motivation ==
Reasons given for the compact include:

1. The current Electoral College system allows a candidate to win the Presidency while losing the popular vote, an outcome seen as counter to the one person, one vote principle of democracy.

This happened in the elections of 1824, 1876, 1888, 2000, and 2016. (The 1960 election is also a disputed example.) Whether these splits suggest an advantage for one major party or the other in the Electoral College is discussed in § Suggested partisan advantage below.

Elections in which the popular vote winner lost
Election	Election winner			Popular vote winner			Difference		Turnout (Note: These figures show percentage of the voting-eligible population, not the percentage of registered voters.)
1824	John Quincy Adams	30.9%	113,122	Andrew Jackson	41.4%	157,271	10.5%	44,149	26.9%
1876	Rutherford B. Hayes	47.9%	4,034,311	Samuel J. Tilden	50.9%	4,288,546	3.0%	254,235	82.6%
1888	Benjamin Harrison	47.8%	5,443,892	Grover Cleveland	48.6%	5,534,488	0.8%	90,596	80.5%
2000	G. W. Bush	47.9%	50,456,002	Al Gore	48.4%	50,999,897	0.5%	543,895	54.2%
2016	Donald Trump	46.1%	62,984,828	Hillary Clinton	48.2%	65,853,514	2.1%	2,868,686	60.1%

2. State winner-take-all laws encourage candidates to focus disproportionately on a limited set of swing states, as small changes in the popular vote in those states produce large changes in the electoral college vote.
  For example, in the 2016 election, a shift of 2,736 votes (or less than 0.4% of all votes cast) toward Donald Trump in New Hampshire would have produced a four electoral vote gain for his campaign. A similar shift in any other state would have produced no change in the electoral vote, thus encouraging the campaign to focus on New Hampshire above other states. A study by FairVote reported that the 2004 candidates devoted three-quarters of their peak season campaign resources to just five states, while the other 45 states received very little attention. The report also stated that 18 states received no candidate visits and no TV advertising. This means that swing state issues receive more attention, while issues important to other states are largely ignored.
3. State winner-take-all laws tend to decrease voter turnout in states without close races. Voters living outside the swing states have a greater certainty of which candidate is likely to win their state. This knowledge of the probable outcome decreases their incentive to vote. A report by The Center for Information and Research on Civic Learning and Engagement (CIRCLE) found that turnout among eligible voters under age 30 was 64.4% in the ten closest battleground states and only 47.6% in the rest of the country – a 17% gap.

== Enactment prospects ==
Political analyst Nate Silver noted in 2014 that all jurisdictions that had adopted the compact at that time were blue states, and that there were not enough electoral votes from the remaining blue states to achieve the required majority. He concluded that, as swing states were unlikely to support a compact that reduces their influence (see § Campaign focus on swing states), the compact could not succeed without adoption by some red states as well. Republican-led chambers have adopted the measure in New York (2011), Oklahoma (2014), and Arizona (2016), and the measure has been unanimously approved by Republican-led committees in Georgia and Missouri, prior to the 2016 election. On March 15, 2019, Colorado became the most "purple" state to join the compact, though no Republican legislators supported the bill and Colorado had a state government trifecta under Democrats. It was later submitted to a ballot initiative, where it was approved by 52% of voters. Since then, several "purpler" states have joined the compact through the additions of New Mexico, Maine, Minnesota, and Virginia. The "swing" state of Nevada passed legislation to join the compact when it had a Democratic legislative majority, but required the legislation to be passed again in 2025, which it did not.

Following the 2026 midterm elections, Democrats gained five state government trifectas in states not previously party to the compact – Arizona, Michigan, Nevada, Pennsylvania, and Wisconsin – creating a viable legislative path towards enacting the National Popular Vote Interstate Compact before the 2028 presidential election. As 48 additional electoral votes are required to reach the 270-vote majority threshold, activation could be achieved by the joining of a combination of Pennsylvania (19 electoral votes), Michigan (15), and any two of Arizona (11), Wisconsin (10), or Nevada (6).

In addition to the adoption threshold, the NPVIC raises potential legal issues (see § Constitutionality) that could draw challenges to the compact.

== Debate over effects ==
The project has been supported by editorials in newspapers, including The New York Times, the Chicago Sun-Times, the Los Angeles Times, The Boston Globe, and the Minneapolis Star Tribune, arguing that the existing system discourages voter turnout and leaves emphasis on only a few states and a few issues, while a popular election would equalize voting power. Others have argued against it, including the Honolulu Star-Bulletin. Pete du Pont, a former governor of Delaware, in an opinion piece in The Wall Street Journal, called the project an "urban power grab" that would shift politics entirely to urban issues in high population states and allow lower caliber candidates to run. A collection of readings pro and con has been assembled by the League of Women Voters. Some of the most common points of debate are detailed below:

=== Protective function of the Electoral College ===
Certain founders, notably Alexander Hamilton and James Madison, conceived of the Electoral College as a deliberative body which would weigh the inputs of the states, but not be bound by them, in selecting the president, and would therefore serve to protect the country from the election of a person who is unfit to be president. However, the Electoral College has never served such a role in practice. From 1796 onward, presidential electors have acted as "rubber stamps" for their parties' nominees. Journalist and commentator Peter Beinart has cited the election of Donald Trump, whom some, he notes, view as unfit, as evidence that the Electoral College does not perform a protective function. As of 2026, no election outcome has been determined by an elector deviating from the will of their state. Furthermore, thirty-two states and the District of Columbia have laws to prevent such "faithless electors", and such laws were upheld as constitutional by the Supreme Court in 2020 in Chiafalo v. Washington. The National Popular Vote Interstate Compact does not eliminate the Electoral College or affect faithless elector laws; it merely changes how electors are pledged by the participating states.

=== Campaign focus on swing states ===
Focus of major-party candidates in the final stretch of the 2004 presidential campaign (September 26 – November 2, 2004)
Spending on advertising per capita: < $0.50; $0.50 – 1.00; $1.00 – 2.00; $2.00 – 4.00; > $4.00; Campaign visits per 1 million residents: No visits; 0 – 1.0; 1.0 – 3.0; 3.0 – 9.0; > 9.0

Under the current system, campaign focus – as measured by spending, visits, and attention to regional or state issues – is largely limited to the few swing states whose electoral outcomes are competitive, with politically "solid" states mostly ignored by the campaigns. The adjacent maps illustrate the amount spent on advertising and the number of visits to each state, relative to population, by the two major-party candidates in the last stretch of the 2004 presidential campaign. Supporters of the compact contend that a national popular vote would encourage candidates to campaign with equal effort for votes in competitive and non-competitive states alike. Critics of the compact argue that candidates would have less incentive to focus on regions with smaller populations or fewer urban areas, and would thus be less motivated to address rural issues.

=== Disputed results and electoral fraud ===
Opponents of the compact have raised concerns about the handling of close or disputed outcomes. National Popular Vote contends that an election being decided based on a disputed tally is far less likely under the NPVIC, which creates one large nationwide pool of voters, than under the current system, in which the national winner may be determined by an extremely small margin in any one of the fifty-one smaller statewide tallies. However, the national popular vote can theoretically be closer than the vote tally within any one state. In the event of an exact tie in the nationwide tally, NPVIC member states will award their electors to the winner of the popular vote in their state. Under the NPVIC, each state will continue to handle disputes and statewide recounts as governed by their own laws. The NPVIC does not include any provision for a nationwide recount, though Congress has the authority to create such a provision.

Former Governor Pete du Pont argued that the NPVIC would enable electoral fraud, stating, "Mr. Gore's 540,000-vote margin [in the 2000 election] amounted to 3.1 votes in each of the country's 175,000 precincts. 'Finding' three votes per precinct in urban areas is not a difficult thing...". However, National Popular Vote counters that altering the outcome via fraud would be more difficult under a national popular vote than under the current system, due to the greater number of total votes that would likely need to be fraudulently altered: currently, a close election may be determined by the outcome in only a few close states (see tipping-point state), and the margin in the closest of those states is likely to be far smaller than the nationwide margin, due to the smaller pool of voters at the state level, and the fact that several states may be capable of tipping the election.

=== Suggested partisan advantage ===
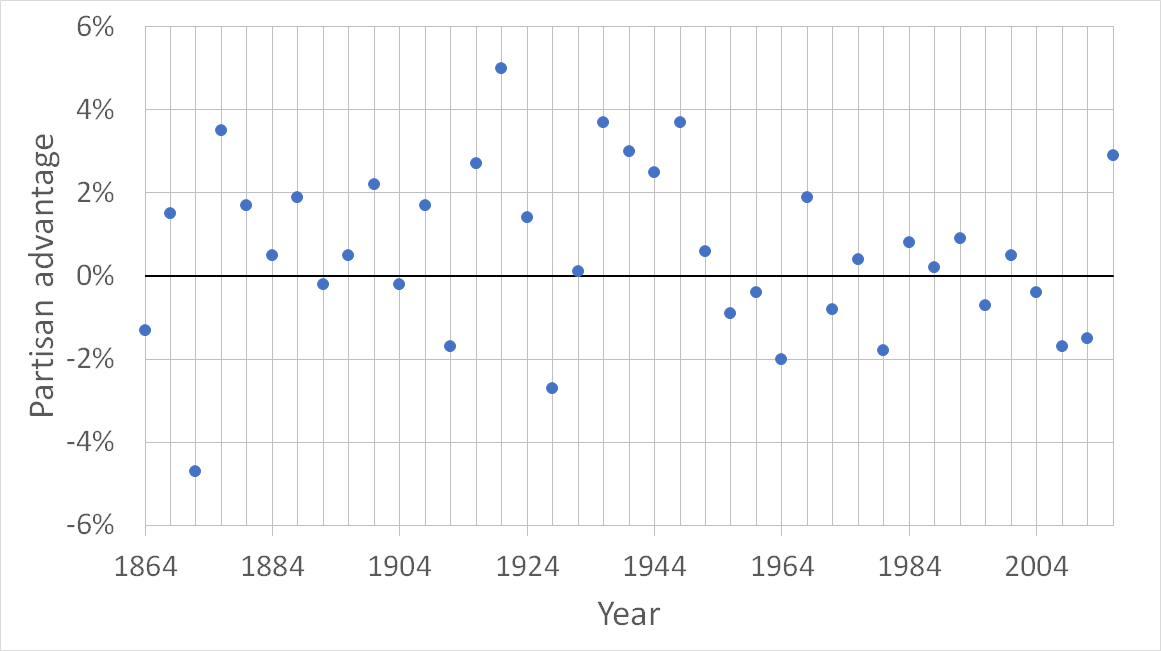
Historical partisan advantage in the Electoral College, computed as the difference between popular vote margins nationally and in the tipping-point state(s). Positive values indicate a Republican advantage and negative values indicate a Democratic advantage.

Some supporters and opponents of the NPVIC believe it gives one party an advantage relative to the current Electoral College system. Former Delaware Governor Pete du Pont, a Republican, has argued that the compact would be an "urban power grab" and benefit Democrats. However, Saul Anuzis, former chairman of the Michigan Republican Party, wrote that Republicans "need" the compact, citing what he believes to be the center-right nature of the American electorate. New Yorker essayist Hendrik Hertzberg concluded that the NPVIC would benefit neither party, noting that historically both Republicans and Democrats have been successful in winning the popular vote in presidential elections.

A statistical analysis by FiveThirtyEight's Nate Silver of all presidential elections from 1864 to 2016 (see adjacent chart) found that the Electoral College has not consistently favored one major party or the other, and that any advantage in the Electoral College does not tend to last long, noting that "there's almost no correlation between which party has the Electoral College advantage in one election and which has it four years later." In all four elections since 1876 in which the winner lost the popular vote, the Republican became president; however, Silver's analysis shows that such splits are about equally likely to favor either major party. A popular vote-Electoral College split favoring the Democrat John Kerry nearly occurred in 2004.

=== State power relative to population ===
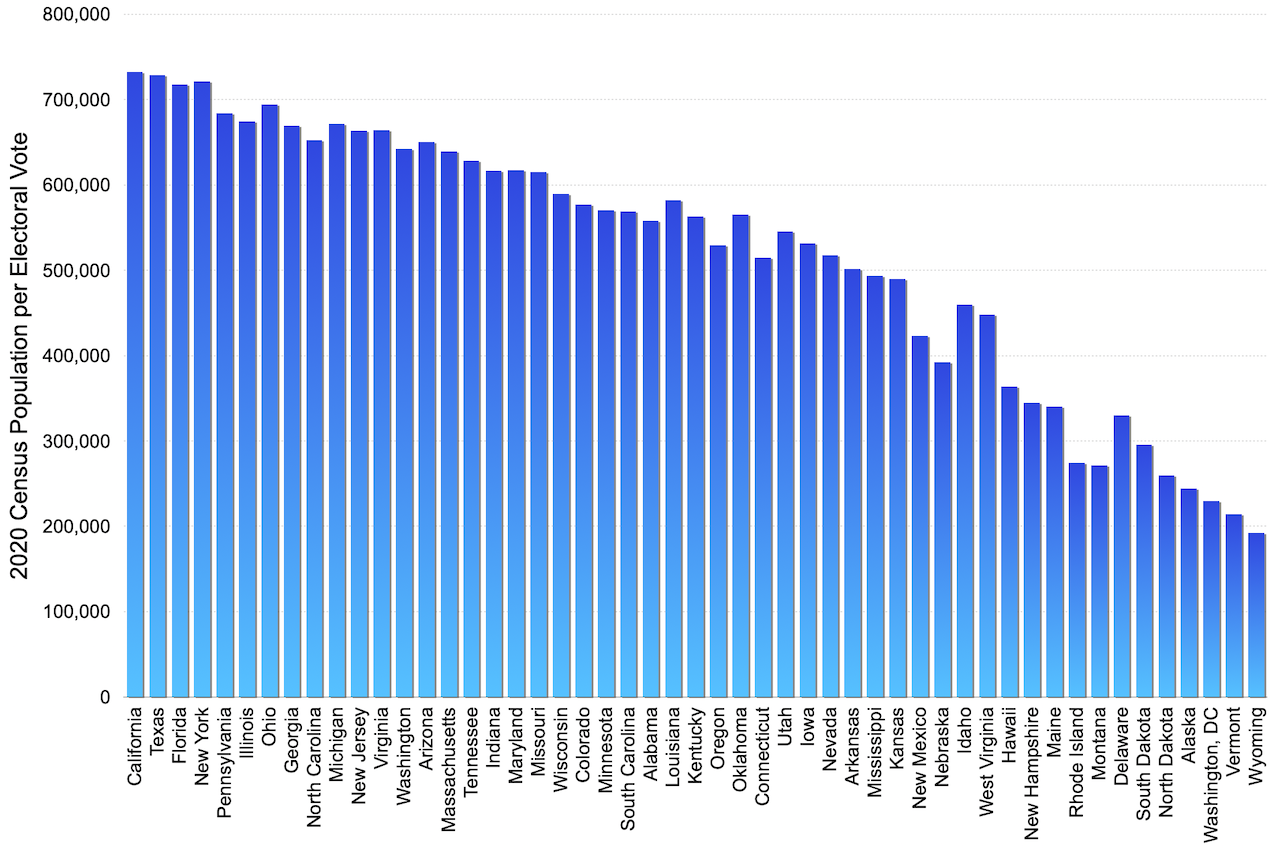
State population per electoral vote from the 2020 census

There is some debate over whether the Electoral College favors low- or high-population states. Those who argue that the College favors low-population states point out that such states have proportionally more electoral votes relative to their populations. (Note: Each state's electoral votes are equal to the sum of its seats in both houses of Congress. The allocation of House seats, which is approximately proportional to population (see United States congressional apportionment § Apportionment methods), has been distorted by the fixed size of the House since 1929 and the requirement that each state have at least one representative. Each state has two Senate seats regardless of population. Both factors favor less populous states.) As of the reapportionment based on the 2020 United States census, the least populous state – Wyoming, with three electors – has 3.3 times the electoral votes it would have in a proportional-by-population allocation of electoral votes; the most populous state, California, has 16% less. (Note: Per the 2020 census, Wyoming accounted for 0.17% of the US population, but it controlled 3 electoral votes, or 0.56% of the Electoral College, after reapportionment. California accounted for 11.9% of the population, but controlled 54 electoral votes, or 10.0% of the College, after reapportionment.) Thus, citizens of Wyoming each carry 3.9 times more weight in the Electoral College than citizens of California. In contrast, the NPVIC would give equal weight to each voter's ballot, regardless of what state they live in. Others, however, believe that since most states award electoral votes on a winner-takes-all system (the "unit rule"), the potential of populous states to shift greater numbers of electoral votes gives them more clout than would be expected from their electoral vote count alone.

Some opponents of a national popular vote contend that the non-proportionality of the Electoral College is a fundamental component of the federal system established by the Constitutional Convention. Specifically, the Connecticut Compromise established a bicameral legislature – with proportional representation of the states in the House of Representatives and equal representation of the states in the Senate – as a compromise between less populous states fearful of having their interests dominated and voices drowned out by larger states, and larger states which viewed anything other than proportional representation as an affront to principles of democratic representation. The ratio of the populations of the most and least populous states is far greater currently (68.50 as of the 2020 census) (Note: 39,538,223 for California vs. 576,851 for Wyoming) than when the Connecticut Compromise was adopted (12.65 as of the 1790 census), (Note: 747,610 for Virginia vs. 59,094 for Delaware, Three-fifths Compromise notwithstanding) exaggerating the non-proportional component of the compromise allocation.

=== Irrelevance of state-level majorities ===
Three governors who have vetoed NPVIC legislation – Arnold Schwarzenegger of California, Linda Lingle of Hawaii, and Steve Sisolak of Nevada – objected to the compact on the grounds that it could require their states' electoral votes to be awarded to a candidate who did not win a majority in their state. (California and Hawaii have since enacted laws joining the compact.) Supporters of the compact counter that under a national popular vote system, state-level majorities are irrelevant; in all states, votes contribute to the nationwide tally, which determines the winner. Individual votes combine to directly determine the outcome, while the intermediary measure of state-level majorities is rendered obsolete.

=== Proliferation of candidates ===
Some opponents of the compact contend that it would lead to a proliferation of third-party candidates, such that an election could be won with a plurality of as little as 15% of the vote. However, evidence from U.S. gubernatorial and other plurality-based races does not bear out this suggestion. In the 1,975 general elections for governor in the U.S. between 1948 and 2011, 90% of winners received more than 50% of the vote, 99% received more than 40%, and all received more than 35%. Duverger's law holds that plurality elections do not generally create a proliferation of minor candidacies with significant vote shares.

=== State voting law differences ===
Each state sets its own rules for voting, including registration deadlines, voter ID laws, poll opening and closing times, conditions for early and absentee voting, and disenfranchisement of felons. Currently, parties in power have an incentive to create state rules meant to skew the relative turnout for each party in their favor, by, for example, making voting more difficult for groups that tend to vote against them. Under NPVIC, this incentive may be reduced, as electoral votes will no longer be rewarded on the basis of statewide vote totals, but on nationwide results, which are less likely to be significantly affected by the voting rules of any one state. Under the compact, however, there may be an incentive for states to create rules that make voting easier for all, to increase their total turnout, and thus their impact on the nationwide vote totals. In either system, the voting rules of each state have the potential to affect the election outcome for the entire country.

== Constitutionality ==
There is ongoing legal debate about the constitutionality of the compact. At issue are interpretations of the Compact Clause of Article I, Section X, and states' plenary power under the Elections Clause of Article II, Section I.

=== Compact clause ===
A 2019 report by the Congressional Research Service examined whether the NPVIC should be considered an interstate compact, and as such, whether it would require congressional approval to take effect. At issue is whether the NPVIC would affect the vertical balance of power between the federal government and state governments, and the horizontal balance of power between the states.

With respect to vertical balance of power, the NPVIC removes the possibility of contingent elections for president conducted by the U.S. House of Representatives. Whether this would be a de minimis diminishment of federal power is unresolved. The Supreme Court has also held that congressional consent is required for interstate compacts that alter the horizontal balance of power among the states. There is debate over whether the NPVIC affects the power of non-compacting states with regard to presidential elections.

Ian Drake, a law professor at Montclair State University, has argued that Congress cannot consent to the NPVIC, because Congress has no power to alter the functioning of the Electoral College under Article I, Section VIII. However, a report by the Government Accountability Office suggests congressional authority is not limited in this way.

The CRS report concluded that the NPVIC would likely become the source of considerable litigation, and it is likely that the Supreme Court will be involved in any resolution of the constitutional issues surrounding it. NPV Inc. has stated that it plans to seek congressional approval if the compact is approved by a sufficient number of states.

=== Plenary power doctrine ===
Proponents of the compact have argued that states have the plenary power to appoint electors in accordance with the national popular vote under the Elections Clause of Article II, Section I. However, the Supreme Court has found limits on the manner in which states may appoint their electors, under several Constitutional amendments.

The Supreme Court has held in Chiafalo v. Washington that states may bind their electors to the state's popular vote, enforceable by penalty or removal and replacement. This has been interpreted by some legal observers as a precedent that states may likewise choose to bind their electors to the national popular vote, while other legal observers cautioned against reading the opinion too broadly.

Due to a lack of a precedent and case law, the CRS report concludes that whether states are allowed to appoint their electors in accordance with the national popular vote is an open question.

== History ==
=== Public support for Electoral College reform ===
Public opinion surveys suggest that a majority or plurality of Americans support a popular vote for president. Gallup polls dating back to 1944 showed consistent majorities of the public supporting a direct vote. A 2007 Washington Post and Kaiser Family Foundation poll found that 72% favored replacing the Electoral College with a direct election, including 78% of Democrats, 60% of Republicans, and 73% of independent voters.

A November 2016 Gallup poll following the 2016 U.S. presidential election showed that Americans' support for amending the U.S. Constitution to replace the Electoral College with a national popular vote fell to 49%, with 47% opposed. Republican support for replacing the Electoral College with a national popular vote dropped significantly, from 54% in 2011 to 19% in 2016, which Gallup attributed to a partisan response to the 2016 result, where the Republican candidate Donald Trump won the Electoral College despite losing the popular vote. In March 2018, a Pew Research Center poll showed that 55% of Americans supported replacing the Electoral College with a national popular vote, with 41% opposed, but that a partisan divide remained in that support, as 75% of self-identified Democrats supported replacing the Electoral College with a national popular vote, while only 32% of self-identified Republicans did. A September 2020 Gallup poll showed support for amending the U.S. Constitution to replace the Electoral College with a national popular vote rose to 61% with 38% opposed, similar to levels prior to the 2016 election, although the partisan divide continued with support from 89% of Democrats and 68% of independents, but only 23% of Republicans. An August 2022 Pew Research Center poll showed 63% support for a national popular vote versus 35% opposed, with support from 80% of Democrats and 42% of Republicans.

=== Proposals for constitutional amendment ===
The Electoral College system was established by Article II, Section 1 of the U.S. Constitution, drafted in 1787. It "has been a source of discontent for more than 200 years." Over 700 proposals to reform or eliminate the system have been introduced in Congress, making it one of the most popular topics of constitutional reform. Electoral College reform and abolition has been advocated "by a long roster of mainstream political leaders with disparate political interests and ideologies." Proponents of these proposals argued that the electoral college system does not provide for direct democratic election, affords less-populous states an advantage, and allows a candidate to win the presidency without winning the most votes. Reform amendments were approved by two-thirds majorities in one branch of Congress six times in history. However, other than the 12th Amendment in 1804, none of these proposals have received the approval of two-thirds of both branches of Congress and three-fourths of the states required to amend the Constitution. The difficulty of amending the Constitution has always been the "most prominent structural obstacle" to reform efforts.

Since the 1940s, when modern scientific polling on the subject began, a majority of Americans have preferred changing the electoral college system. Between 1948 and 1979, Congress debated electoral college reform extensively, and hundreds of reform proposals were introduced in the House and Senate. During this period, Senate and House Judiciary Committees held hearings on 17 different occasions. Proposals were debated five times in the Senate and twice in the House, and approved by two-thirds majorities twice in the Senate and once in the House, but never at the same time. In the late 1960s and 1970s, over 65% of voters supported amending the Constitution to replace the Electoral College with a national popular vote, with support peaking at 80% in 1968, after Richard Nixon almost lost the popular vote while winning the Electoral College vote. A similar situation occurred again with Jimmy Carter's election in 1976; a poll taken weeks after the election found 73% support for eliminating the Electoral College by amendment. Carter himself proposed a Constitutional amendment that would include the abolition of the electoral college shortly after taking office in 1977. After a direct popular election amendment failed to pass the Senate in 1979 and prominent congressional advocates retired or were defeated in elections, electoral college reform subsided from public attention and the number of reform proposals in Congress dwindled.

=== Interstate compact plan ===
Distribution of electoral votes following the 2020 census

The 2000 U.S. presidential election produced the first divergence between the national popular and electoral votes since 1888, as Al Gore carried the popular vote but lost the Electoral College vote to George W. Bush. This sparked studies and proposals from scholars and activists on electoral college reform, ultimately leading to the National Popular Vote Interstate Compact (NPVIC).

In 2001, two articles were published by law professors suggesting paths to a national popular vote through state legislative action rather than constitutional amendment. The first, a paper by Northwestern University law professor Robert W. Bennett, suggested states could pressure Congress to pass a constitutional amendment by acting together to pledge their electoral votes to the winner of the national popular vote. Bennett noted that the 17th Amendment was passed only after states had enacted state-level reform measures unilaterally.

A few months later, Yale Law School professor Akhil Amar and his brother, University of California Hastings School of Law professor Vikram Amar, wrote a paper suggesting states could coordinate their efforts by passing uniform legislation under the Presidential Electors Clause and Compact Clause of the Constitution. The legislation could be structured to take effect only once enough states to control a majority of the Electoral College (270 votes) joined the compact, thereby guaranteeing that the national popular vote winner would also win the electoral college. Bennett and the Amar brothers "are generally credited as the intellectual godparents" of NPVIC.

=== Organization and advocacy ===
Building on the work of Bennett and the Amar brothers, in 2006, John Koza, a computer scientist and former Democratic elector, created the National Popular Vote Interstate Compact (NPVIC), a formal interstate compact that linked and unified individual states' pledges to commit their electoral votes to the winner of the national popular vote. NPVIC offered what it called “a framework for building support one state at a time as well as a legal mechanism for enforcing states' commitments after the threshold of 270 had been reached." Compacts of this type had long existed to regulate interstate issues such as water rights, ports, and nuclear waste.

Koza, who had earned substantial wealth by co-inventing the scratchcard, had worked on lottery compacts such as the Tri-State Lottery with an election lawyer, Barry Fadem. To promote NPVIC, Koza, Fadem, and a group of former Democratic and Republican Senators and Representatives, formed a California 501(c)(4) non-profit, National Popular Vote Inc. (NPV, Inc.). NPV, Inc. published Every Vote Equal, a detailed, "600-page tome" explaining and advocating for NPVIC, and a regular newsletter reporting on activities and encouraging readers to petition their governors and state legislators to pass NPVIC. NPV, Inc. also commissioned statewide opinion polls, organized educational seminars for legislators, and hired lobbyists in almost every state seriously considering NPVIC legislation.

NPVIC was announced at a press conference in Washington, D.C., on February 23, 2006, with the endorsement of former U.S. Senator Birch Bayh; Chellie Pingree, president of Common Cause; Rob Richie, executive director of FairVote; and former U.S. Representatives John Anderson and John Buchanan. NPV, Inc. announced it planned to introduce legislation in all 50 states and had already done so in Illinois. "To many observers, the NPVIC looked initially to be an implausible, long-shot approach to reform", but within months of the campaign's launch, several major newspapers including The New York Times and Los Angeles Times, published favorable editorials. Shortly after the press conference, NPVIC legislation was introduced in five additional state legislatures, "most with bipartisan support". It passed in the Colorado Senate, and in both houses of the California legislature before being vetoed by Governor Arnold Schwarzenegger.

=== Adoption ===
In 2007, NPVIC legislation was introduced in 42 states. It was passed by at least one legislative chamber in Arkansas, California, Colorado, Illinois, New Jersey, North Carolina, Maryland, and Hawaii. Maryland became the first state to join the compact when Governor Martin O'Malley signed it into law on April 10, 2007.

By 2019, NPVIC legislation had been introduced in all 50 states. As of September 2026, the NPVIC has been adopted by eighteen states and the District of Columbia. Together, they have 222 electoral votes, which is 41.3% of the Electoral College and 82.2% of the 270 votes needed to give the compact legal force.

In Nevada, the Legislature passed Assembly Joint Resolution 6 in 2023, but failed to pass it again in 2025 to amend the state's constitution. States where only one chamber has passed the legislation are Arizona, Arkansas, Michigan, North Carolina, and Oklahoma. Bills seeking to repeal the compact in Connecticut, Maryland, New Jersey, and Washington have failed.

No Republican governor has signed or allowed the compact to enter into law, though it has passed several Republican-led chambers and committees. This partisan split, if it continues, will affect the likelihood of the compact reaching the enactment threshold; see § Enactment prospects. The possibility of a partisan advantage to the compact is discussed in § Suggested partisan advantage.

History of adoption of the NPVIC as of September 2026. State-by-state details are in the table below.

Jurisdictions enacting law to join the National Popular Vote Interstate Compact
No.	Jurisdiction	Date adopted	Method of adoption	Ref.	Current electoral votes
1	Maryland	April 10, 2007	Signed by Gov. Martin O'Malley		10
2	New Jersey	January 13, 2008	Signed by Gov. Jon Corzine		14
3	Illinois	April 7, 2008	Signed by Gov. Rod Blagojevich		19
4	Hawaii	May 1, 2008	Legislature overrode veto of Gov. Linda Lingle		4
5	Washington	April 28, 2009	Signed by Gov. Christine Gregoire		12
6	Massachusetts	August 4, 2010	Signed by Gov. Deval Patrick		11
7	District of Columbia	October 12, 2010	Signed by Mayor Adrian Fenty (Note: Congress did not enact a joint resolution objecting to the passage of DC's bill during the 30-day congressional review period following passage, thus allowing the District's action to proceed.)		3
8	Vermont	April 22, 2011	Signed by Gov. Peter Shumlin		3
9	California	August 8, 2011	Signed by Gov. Jerry Brown		54
10	Rhode Island	July 12, 2013	Signed by Gov. Lincoln Chafee		4
11	New York	April 15, 2014	Signed by Gov. Andrew Cuomo		28
12	Connecticut	May 24, 2018	Signed by Gov. Dannel Malloy		7
13	Colorado	March 15, 2019	Signed by Gov. Jared Polis		10
14	Delaware	March 28, 2019	Signed by Gov. John Carney		3
15	New Mexico	April 3, 2019	Signed by Gov. Michelle Lujan Grisham		5
16	Oregon	June 12, 2019	Signed by Gov. Kate Brown		8
17	Minnesota	May 24, 2023	Signed by Gov. Tim Walz		10
18	Maine	April 16, 2024	Enacted without signature of Gov. Janet Mills		4
19	Virginia	April 13, 2026	Signed by Gov. Abigail Spanberger		13
Total					222
Percentage of the 270 EVs needed					82.2%

==== Initiatives and referendums ====
In Maine, an initiative to join the National Popular Vote Interstate Compact began collecting signatures on April 17, 2016. It failed to collect enough signatures to appear on the ballot. In Arizona, a similar initiative began collecting signatures on December 19, 2016, but failed to collect the required 150,642 signatures by July 5, 2018. In Missouri, an initiative did not collect the required number of signatures before the deadline of May 6, 2018.

Colorado Proposition 113, a ballot measure seeking to overturn Colorado's adoption of the compact, was on the November 3, 2020 ballot; Colorado's membership was affirmed by a vote of 52.3% to 47.7% in the referendum.

=== Reapportionment ===
In April 2021, reapportionment following the 2020 census caused NPVIC members California, Illinois and New York to each lose one electoral vote, and Colorado and Oregon to each gain one, causing the total electoral votes represented by members to fall from 196 to 195.

=== Opposing action by North Dakota ===
On February 17, 2021, the North Dakota Senate passed SB 2271, "to amend and reenact sections ... relating to procedures for canvassing and counting votes for presidential electors". The bill's purpose was to stymie the efficacy of the NPVIC by keeping the state's popular vote a secret to be made public during the meeting of the Electoral College. Later the bill was entirely rewritten as only a statement of intent and ordering a study for future recommendations, and this version was signed into law.

== Bills ==
=== Bills in latest session ===
The table below lists all state bills to join the NPVIC introduced in a state's current or most recent legislative session. That includes all bills that are law, pending or have failed. The "EVs" column indicates the number of electoral votes each state has.

State	EVs	Session	Bill	Latest action	Lower house	Upper house	Executive	Status	Ref.
Arizona	11	2026	SB 1300	January 26, 2026	—N/a	Died in committee	—N/a	Failed	
Arizona	11	2026	HB 4013	February 10, 2026	Died in committee	—N/a	—N/a	Failed	
Kansas	6	2025–26	HB 2257	February 4, 2025	Died in committee	—N/a	—N/a	Failed	
Mississippi	6	2026	HB 861	February 3, 2026	Died in committee	—N/a	—N/a	Failed	
Pennsylvania	19	2025–26	HB 270	April 9, 2025	In committee	—N/a	—N/a	Pending	
South Carolina	9	2025–26	H 3870	January 30, 2025	Died in committee	—N/a	—N/a	Failed	
Virginia	13	2026	HB 965	April 13, 2026	Passed 61–36	Passed 21–19	Signed	Law	
Virginia	13	2026	SB 322	April 13, 2026	Passed 62–36	Passed 21–19	Signed	Law	
Wisconsin	12	2025–26	AB 1152	March 23, 2026	Died in committee	—N/a	—N/a	Failed	
Wisconsin	12	2025–26	SB 1117	March 23, 2026	—N/a	Died in committee	—N/a	Failed	

=== Bills receiving floor votes in previous sessions ===
The table below lists past bills that received a floor vote (a vote by the full chamber) in at least one chamber of the state's legislature. Bills that failed without a floor vote are not listed.

State	EVs	Session	Bill	Lower house	Upper house	Executive	Outcome	Ref.
Arizona	11	2016	HB 2456	Passed 40–16	Died in committee	—N/a	Failed	
Arkansas	6	2007	HB 1703	Passed 52–41	Died in committee	—N/a	Failed	
Arkansas	6	2009	HB 1339	Passed 56–43	Died in committee	—N/a	Failed	
California	55	2005–06	AB 2948	Passed 48–30	Passed 23–14	Vetoed	Failed	
California	55	2007–08	SB 37	Passed 45–30	Passed 21–16	Vetoed	Failed	
California	55	2011–12	AB 459	Passed 52–15	Passed 23–15	Signed	Law	
Colorado	9	2006	SB 06-223	Indefinitely postponed	Passed 20–15	—N/a	Failed	
Colorado	9	2007	SB 07-046	Indefinitely postponed	Passed 19–15	—N/a	Failed	
Colorado	9	2009	HB 09-1299	Passed 34–29	Not voted	—N/a	Failed	
Colorado	9	2019	SB 19-042	Passed 34–29	Passed 19–16	Signed	Law	
Connecticut	7	2009	HB 6437	Passed 76–69	Not voted	—N/a	Failed	
Connecticut	7	2018	HB 5421	Passed 77–73	Passed 21–14	Signed	Law	
Delaware	3	2009–10	HB 198	Passed 23–11	Not voted	—N/a	Failed	
Delaware	3	2011–12	HB 55	Passed 21–19	Died in committee	—N/a	Failed	
Delaware	3	2019–20	SB 22	Passed 24–17	Passed 14–7	Signed	Law	
District of Columbia	3	2009–10	B18-0769	Passed 11–0		Signed	Law	
Hawaii	4	2007	SB 1956	Passed 35–12	Passed 19–4	Vetoed	Failed	
Hawaii	4	2007	SB 1956	Override not voted	Overrode 20–5	Vetoed	Failed	
Hawaii	4	2008	HB 3013	Passed 36–9	Died in committee	—N/a	Failed	
Hawaii	4	2008	SB 2898	Passed 39–8	Passed 20–4	Vetoed	Law	
Hawaii	4	2008	SB 2898	Overrode 36–3	Overrode 20–4	Overridden	Law	
Illinois	21	2007–08	HB 858	Passed 65–50	Died in committee	—N/a	Failed	
Illinois	21	2007–08	HB 1685	Passed 64–50	Passed 37–22	Signed	Law	
Louisiana	8	2012	HB 1095	Failed 29–64	—N/a	—N/a	Failed	
Maine	4	2007–08	LD 1744	Indefinitely postponed	Passed 18–17	—N/a	Failed	
Maine	4	2013–14	LD 511	Failed 60–85	Failed 17–17	—N/a	Failed	
Maine	4	2017–18	LD 156	Failed 66–73	Failed 14–21	—N/a	Failed	
Maine	4	2019–20	LD 816	Failed 66–76	Passed 19–16	—N/a	Failed	
Maine	4	2019–20	LD 816	Passed 77–69 (Note: In the Maine legislature, bills must be passed by a vote in both houses and then enacted by another vote in both houses before they can be sent to the governor. In each instance, if the houses disagree, they may repeat the vote.)	Insisted 21–14	—N/a	Failed	
Maine	4	2019–20	LD 816	Enactment failed 68–79	Enacted 18–16	—N/a	Failed	
Maine	4	2019–20	LD 816	Enactment failed 69–74	Insisted on enactment	—N/a	Failed	
Maine	4	2023–24	LD 1578	Passed 74–67	Passed 22–13	No action	Law	
Maine	4	2023–24	LD 1578	Enacted 73–72	Enacted 18–12	No action	Law	
Maryland	10	2007	HB 148	Passed 85–54	Passed 29–17	Signed	Law	
Maryland	10	2007	SB 634	Passed 84–54	Passed 29–17	Signed	Law	
Massachusetts	12	2007–08	H 4952	Passed 116–37	Passed	—N/a	Failed	
Massachusetts	12	2007–08	H 4952	Enacted	Enactment not voted (Note: In the Massachusetts legislature, bills must be passed by a vote in both houses and then enacted by another vote in both houses before they can be sent to the governor.)	—N/a	Failed	
Massachusetts	12	2009–10	H 4156	Passed 114–35	Passed 28–10	Signed	Law	
Massachusetts	12	2009–10	H 4156	Enacted 116–34	Enacted 28–9	Signed	Law	
Michigan	17	2007–08	HB 6610	Passed 65–36	Died in committee	—N/a	Failed	
Minnesota	10	2013–14	HF 799	Failed 62–71	—N/a	—N/a	Failed	
Minnesota	10	2019–20	SF 2227	Passed 73–58	Not voted (Note: This omnibus bill, initially without the NPVIC, was passed by the Senate, then amended to include the NPVIC and passed by the House. The bill was sent to a conference committee to reconcile the two versions but it was not further considered.)	—N/a	Failed	
Minnesota	10	2023–24	SF 1362	Died in committee	Passed 34–33	—N/a	Failed	
Minnesota	10	2023–24	HF 1830	Passed 70–59	Not voted (Note: This omnibus bill including the NPVIC was passed by the House, then amended to a version without the NPVIC and passed by the Senate. The bill was sent to a conference committee, which reincluded the NPVIC, and the revised bill was passed by both houses.)	Signed	Law	
Minnesota	10	2023–24	HF 1830	Repassed 69–62	Repassed 34–31	Signed	Law	
Montana	3	2007	SB 290	—N/a	Failed 20–30	—N/a	Failed	
Nevada	5	2009	AB 413	Passed 27–14	Died in committee	—N/a	Failed	
Nevada	6	2019	AB 186	Passed 23–17	Passed 12–8	Vetoed	Failed	
Nevada	6	2023	AJR 6	Passed 27–14	Passed 12–9	—N/a	Failed (Note: This proposed amendment to the Constitution of Nevada was passed by the legislature in 2023. To be enacted, it had to be passed by the legislature again in 2025, but was not.)	
New Hampshire	4	2017–18	HB 447	Failed 132–234	—N/a	—N/a	Failed	
New Jersey	15	2006–07	A 4225	Passed 43–32	Passed 22–13	Signed	Law	
New Mexico	5	2009	HB 383	Passed 41–27	Died in committee	—N/a	Failed	
New Mexico	5	2017	SB 42	Died in committee	Passed 26–16	—N/a	Failed	
New Mexico	5	2019	HB 55	Passed 41–27	Passed 25–16	Signed	Law	
New York	31	2009–10	S02286	Not voted	Passed	—N/a	Failed	
New York	29	2011–12	S04208	Not voted	Passed	—N/a	Failed	
New York	29	2013–14	A04422	Passed 100–40	Died in committee	—N/a	Failed	
New York	29	2013–14	S03149	Passed 102–33	Passed 57–4	Signed	Law	
North Carolina	15	2007–08	S954	Died in committee	Passed 30–18	—N/a	Failed	
North Dakota	3	2007	HB 1336	Failed 31–60	—N/a	—N/a	Failed	
Oklahoma	7	2013–14	SB 906	Died in committee	Passed 28–18	—N/a	Failed	
Oregon	7	2009	HB 2588	Passed 39–19	Died in committee	—N/a	Failed	
Oregon	7	2013	HB 3077	Passed 38–21	Died in committee	—N/a	Failed	
Oregon	7	2015	HB 3475	Passed 37–21	Died in committee	—N/a	Failed	
Oregon	7	2017	HB 2927	Passed 34–23	Died in committee	—N/a	Failed	
Oregon	7	2019	SB 870	Passed 37–22	Passed 17–12	Signed	Law	
Rhode Island	4	2008	H 7707	Passed 36–34	Passed	Vetoed	Failed	
Rhode Island	4	2008	S 2112	Passed 34–28	Passed	Vetoed	Failed	
Rhode Island	4	2009	H 5569	Failed 28–45	—N/a	—N/a	Failed	
Rhode Island	4	2009	S 161	Died in committee	Passed	—N/a	Failed	
Rhode Island	4	2011	S 164	Died in committee	Passed	—N/a	Failed	
Rhode Island	4	2013	H 5575	Passed 41–31	Passed 32–5	Signed	Law	
Rhode Island	4	2013	S 346	Passed 48–21	Passed 32–4	Signed	Law	
Vermont	3	2007–08	S 270	Passed 77–35	Passed 22–6	Vetoed	Failed	
Vermont	3	2009–10	S 34	Died in committee	Passed 15–10	—N/a	Failed	
Vermont	3	2011–12	S 31	Passed 85–44	Passed 20–10	Signed	Law	
Virginia	13	2020	HB 177	Passed 51–46	Died in committee	—N/a	Failed	
Washington	11	2007–08	SB 5628	Died in committee	Passed 30–18	—N/a	Failed	
Washington	11	2009–10	SB 5599	Passed 52–42	Passed 28–21	Signed	Law	

== See also ==
- Electoral college
- Electoral reform in the United States
- Efforts to reform the United States Electoral College
- Ranked-choice voting in the United States
- Other reforms:
  - Reform of the United States Senate
  - Supreme Court reform in the United States

== Works cited ==
- Whitaker, L. Paige (May 17, 2023). Campaign Finance Law: An Analysis of Key Issues, Recent Developments, and Constitutional Considerations for Legislation (Report). Congressional Research Service.
- Report on the Electoral Count Act of 1887: Proposals for Reform (PDF) (Report). United States House Committee on House Administration. 2022. Archived from the original (PDF) on May 18, 2023.
- Keyssar, Alexander (2020). Why do we still have the electoral college?. Harvard University Press. ISBN 9780674974142. OCLC 1153869791.
- Neale, Thomas H. (October 22, 2020). The Electoral College: A 2020 Presidential Election Timeline (Report). Congressional Research Service.
- Whitaker, L. Paige (September 8, 2020). Political Campaign Contributions and Congress: A Legal Primer (Report). Congressional Research Service.
- Report on Russian Active Measures Campaigns and Interference in the 2016 U.S. Election, Volume 5: Counterintelligence Threats and Vulnerabilities (PDF) (Report). United States Senate Select Committee on Intelligence. 2020.
- Report On The Investigation Into Russian Interference In The 2016 Presidential Election, Volume II of II (PDF) (Report). United States Department of Justice. June 2020b.
- Report On The Investigation Into Russian Interference In The 2016 Presidential Election, Volume I of II (PDF) (Report). United States Department of Justice. June 2020a.
- Neale, Thomas H.; Nolan, Andrew (October 28, 2019). The National Popular Vote (NPV) Initiative: Direct Election of the President by Interstate Compact (Report). Congressional Research Service.
- Report on Russian Active Measures Campaigns and Interference in the 2016 U.S. Election, Volume 2: Russia's Use of Social Media with Additional Views (PDF) (Report). United States Senate Select Committee on Intelligence. October 2019b.
- Report on Russian Active Measures Campaigns and Interference in the 2016 U.S. Election, Volume 1: Russian Efforts Against Election Infrastructure with Additional Views (PDF) (Report). United States Senate Select Committee on Intelligence. July 2019a.
- Rossiter, Clinton, ed. (2003). The Federalist Papers. Signet Classics. ISBN 9780451528810.
- Gamboa, Anthony H. (March 13, 2001). Elections: The Scope of Congressional Authority in Election Administration (PDF) (Report). Government Accountability Office.
