= Melissa Boyle Mahle =

Writer and former CIA officer

- Education: University of California, Berkeley
- Occupations: former intelligence officer, movie consultant non-fiction author, co-founder of SpyGirls Press
- Espionage activity
- Allegiance: United States
- Service branch: United States-Central Intelligence Agency
- Service years: 1980s-2000s

Melissa Boyle Mahle is a writer and former Central Intelligence Agency officer.

== Background ==
She graduated from University of California, Berkeley and went on to acquire fluency in Arabic.

Asked how she became a spy, Mahle told a group of high school students in 2017 that she had never entertained having a career in intelligence work until, one day, while living in the Middle East and working as an archaeologist, she realized that she didn't "want to spend the rest of [her] life in a ditch." She returned to the United States to pursue "a graduate degree in modern political economy, and ... was spotted by a CIA recuiter."

== Covert career ==
Mahle worked as a CIA "field officer" (spy) for the CIA from the mid-1980s until 2002 in the Middle East. She was involved in US intelligence operations in the Middle East, Central Asia, and Africa, including the oversight of operations against al-Qaeda and networks involved in the sale of weapons of mass destruction. Her service spanned the presidencies of Ronald Reagan, George H. W. Bush, Bill Clinton, and to the beginning of George W. Bush.

=== Awards and honors ===
Mahle has received multiple awards from the CIA for exceptional intelligence work performance and her efforts to recruit agents. She was also given a Presidential Letter of Appreciation for her contributions to the Middle East peace process.

== Public career ==
Since leaving the CIA, Mahle has worked as a commentator, movie consultant, author, and publisher.

In 2004, after leaving the CIA, Mahle published Denial and Deception, in which she criticized in detail the CIA as rudderless and adrift in a post-Cold War world up to 9/11. She also described the challenges of being a married woman field agent (in a covert career that overlapped with Valerie Plame).

She appeared as a guest on The Daily Show with Jon Stewart in 2005. For the documentary Secrecy in 2008, which opened at the Sundance Film Festival, she featured in and advised filmmakers Peter Galison and Robb Moss on practices within the Intelligence Community. For the film Salt (2010), she advised actors Angelina Jolie, Liev Schreiber, and Chiwetel Ejiofor on their as well as director Phillip Noyce on script and visuals. For the film Hanna (2011), she advised actress Cate Blanchett on her role and director Joe Wright on script.

She often speaks at the International Spy Museum, particularly youth programs.

She co-founded Spy Girls Press with Kathryn Dennis.

== Selected works ==
- Denial and Deception: An Insider’s View of the CIA from Iran-Contra to 9/11 (The Nation Press, 2004)
- Lost in Petra - Anatolia Steppe Mystery, Book 1) (Spy Girls Press, 2012)
- Camp Secret - Junior Spies, Volume 1 (Spy Girls Press, 2013)
- Uncovered in Istanbul - Anatolia Steppe Mystery, Volume 2 (Spy Girls Press, 2014)
