= Robert W. Bennett =

American legal scholar

- Born: March 30, 1941 (age 85)
- Title: Nathaniel L. Nathanson Professor of Law Emeritus
- Awards: Frank Knox Memorial Fellowship (1965–66)

Academic background
- Education: Harvard University (BA, LLB)

Academic work
- Discipline: Constitutional law
- Institutions: Pritzker School of Law at Northwestern University

Robert William Bennett (born March 30, 1941) is an American legal scholar and the Nathaniel L. Nathanson Professor of Law Emeritus at the Pritzker School of Law at Northwestern University. An expert on constitutional law, he joined the faculty of Northwestern's Law School in 1969, and served as the school's dean from 1985 to 1995. He was named the Nathaniel L. Nathanson Professor of Law there in 2002. He also served as president of the American Bar Foundation from 1992 to 1994. He is credited with being one of the first people to propose the idea behind the National Popular Vote Interstate Compact in a 2001 paper, along with Akhil and Vikram Amar.
