= Barbara Slavin =

American journalist and foreign policy expert (born 1951)

- Born: 1951 (age 74–75); New York City
- Education: Harvard University
- Occupation: Journalist

Barbara Slavin (born 1951) is an American journalist and foreign policy expert. She is a Distinguished Fellow at The Stimson Center and former director of the Future of Iran Initiative at the Atlantic Council's Rafik Hariri Center & Middle East Programs.

== Education ==
Barbara Slavin graduated from Harvard University, where she earned a Bachelor of Arts degree in Russian language and literature.

== Career ==
Slavin was an assistant Managing Editor for World and National Security at The Washington Times, an editor of the Week in Review in The New York Times, and a correspondent for The Economist in Cairo, Egypt, and Senior Diplomatic Reporter for USA Today. She has also written for Business Week, Newsday, and The Los Angeles Times. She was a Washington correspondent for Al-Monitor.

In June–August 2006, Slavin was a scholar at the Woodrow Wilson International Center for Scholars. She was also a senior fellow at the United States Institute of Peace. She also authored the book Bitter Friends, Bosom Enemies.

In an article for the Lowy Institute for International Policy in January 2017, Slavin described President Donald Trump as "a neophyte populist politician whose promise to 'make America great again' is based on a deeply pessimistic view of the American status quo and the world order." She added, "Our new president has a lot to learn and has shown a limited capacity to evolve."

In December 2022 The Future of Iran Initiative concluded its efforts and Slavin left her position as director.

== Works ==
- Slavin, Barbara (2007). Bitter Friends, Bosom Enemies: Iran, the US, and the Twisted Path to Confrontation. New York: St. Martin's Press. ISBN 9780312368258. OCLC 493683087.
- Slavin, Barbara (2008). Mullahs, Money, and Militias: How Iran Exerts Its Influence in the Middle East. Washington, D.C.: United States Institute of Peace. OCLC 232159795.
