= Winning the Future =

Book by Newt Gingrich

Winning the Future: A 21st Century Contract with America
- Author: Newt Gingrich
- Publisher: Regnery Publishing
- Publication date: 2005
- Media type: Hardcover
- ISBN: 0-89526-042-5
- OCLC: 57344769

Winning the Future: A 21st Century Contract with America is a book by former U.S. Speaker of the House Newt Gingrich that outlines Gingrich's plans for the United States of America. Published in 2005 by Regnery Publishing, its themes include: Social Security reform, immigration reform, education reform, increasing the usage of health savings accounts, allowing the disabled the option of working, and American interests within the world trading system.

The C-SPAN interview show After Words debuted on January 2, 2005; Gingrich was interviewed by Norm Ornstein for the first program, and Winning the Future was the subject of the interview.
