= John Koza =

American computer scientist

John R. Koza is a computer scientist and a former adjunct professor at Stanford University, most notable for his work in pioneering the use of genetic programming for the optimization of complex problems. Koza co-founded Scientific Games Corporation, a company which builds computer systems to run state lotteries in the United States. John Koza is also credited with being the creator of the 'scratch card' with the help of retail promotions specialist Daniel Bower.

Koza was born in 1944 and earned a bachelor's degree in computer science from the University of Michigan, being the second person to ever earn a bachelor's degree in computer science. He earned a doctoral degree in computer science from the University of Michigan in 1972.

Koza was featured in Popular Science for his work on evolutionary programming that alters its own code to find far more complex solutions. The machine, which he calls the "invention machine", has created antennae, circuits, and lenses, and has received a patent from the US Patent Office.

== Politics ==
Koza advocates for a plan to revamp the way states choose their electors for the Electoral College in the United States, such that candidates who win the majority of the popular vote would then win a majority of the electors through an interstate compact. He established the organization National Popular Vote Inc. to advocate for state adoption of the policy and the election of supportive candidates.

Koza is a registered Democrat, having twice served as a Democratic elector.

== Works by Koza ==
- Koza, J.R. (1990). Genetic Programming: A Paradigm for Genetically Breeding Populations of Computer Programs to Solve Problems, Stanford University Computer Science Department technical report STAN-CS-90-1314. A thorough report, possibly used as a draft to his 1992 book.
- Koza, J.R. (1992). Genetic Programming: On the Programming of Computers by Means of Natural Selection, MIT Press. ISBN 0-262-11170-5
- Koza, J.R. (1994). Genetic Programming II: Automatic Discovery of Reusable Programs, MIT Press. ISBN 0-262-11189-6
- Koza, J.R.; Goldberg, David; Fogel, David; & Riolo, Rick, (Eds.) (1996). Genetic Programming 1996: Proceedings of the First Annual Conference (Complex Adaptive Systems), MIT Press. ISBN 0-262-61127-9
- Koza, J.R.; Deb, K.; Dorigo, M.; Fogel, D.; Garzon, M.; Iba, H.; & Riolo, R., (Eds.) (1997). Genetic Programming 1997: Proceedings of the Second Annual Conference, Morgan Kaufmann. ISBN 1-55860-483-9
- Koza, J.R.; & Others (Eds.)(1998). Genetic Programming 1998, Morgan Kaufmann Publishers. ISBN 1-55860-548-7
- Koza, J.R.; Bennett, F.H.; Andre, D.; & Keane, M.A. (1999). Genetic Programming III: Darwinian Invention and Problem Solving, Morgan Kaufmann. ISBN 1-55860-543-6
- Koza, J.R.; Keane, M.A.; Streeter, M.J.; Mydlowec, W.; Yu, J.; & Lanza, G. (2003). Genetic Programming IV: Routine Human-Competitive Machine Intelligence, Springer. ISBN 1-4020-7446-8
- Koza, John R.; Fadem, Barry; Grueskin, Mark; Mandell, Michael S.; Richie, Robert; Zimmerman, Joseph F. (2013). Every Vote Equal: A State-Based Plan for Electing the President by National Popular Vote (Fourth ed.). Los Altos, California: National Popular Vote Press. ISBN 978-0-9790107-3-6.
