= Robert Bennet (theologian) =

Robert Bennet or Bennett (died 1687), was an English author.

== Early life and family ==
Of his birth, parentage, and early education nothing has been transmitted. He was at the University of Oxford, and is named by Anthony à Wood; but in what college does not appear. In his Concordance he describes himself as B.D. He was presented by Lord Wharton to the rectory of Waddesdon, Buckinghamshire, in 1648. The living included three separate rectories. One of these had been simultaneously bestowed on a John Ellis, "who scrupled to take the title upon him, and only preached every other Lord's day in his turn." Bennet discharged all the other duties of baptising, pastoral visitation, preaching, etc., but freely let Ellis enjoy half the profits. From the parish registers it is found that he was married, and that his wife's Christian name was Margaret. A son Gervase and daughter Margaret appear among the baptisms.

== Later life ==
On the passing of the Act of Uniformity in 1662, Bennet joined the two thousand ejected, while Ellis conformed, and got his majesty's title to all the three benefices. To his honour, however, it must be recorded that he allowed the ejected rector 55l. for life.

After some time spent in retirement in Derbyshire — probably his native county — he settled at Aylesbury, where he preached privately to a small congregation. Thence he removed to Abingdon, Berkshire, where he died 6 April 1687. It may be noted that Lipscomb in his list of the rectors of Waddesdon designates him Richard. Probably the mistake originated in the fact that a former rector (in 1383) was a Richard Bennet. His Theological Concordance has only R. Bennet, but the parish entry is distinctly Robert, and so Calamy.

== Works ==
Bennet was the author of A Theological Concordance of the Synonymous Terms in the Holy Scriptures, wherein the many various and different Words and Phrases that concur in Sense and Signification, are exactly referred to their distinct Heads and Common Places, digested in an Alphabetical Order. Very useful for all Students in Divinity and Labourers in the great Work of the Ministery, and for all that desire to search into the hidden Treasures of the Scripture for Increase in Knowledge and Confirmation in the Faith. By R. Bennet, B.D. London, 1657. Bennet's Theological Concordance was in use for many generations.
