= National Popular Vote Inc. =

US organization on the national popular vote

- Abbreviation: NPV Inc.
- Formation: 2006 (20 years ago)
- Founders: John Koza; Barry Fadem
- Type: Nonprofit corporation 501(c)(4)
- Purpose: Enactment of the National Popular Vote Interstate Compact, which would guarantee the U.S. presidency to the candidate who wins the national popular vote across all fifty states and Washington, D.C.
- Headquarters: Los Altos, California, U.S.
- Board of directors: John Koza; Barry Fadem; Christopher Pearson; Pam Wilmot; Stephen Silberstein
- Key people: John Koza; (Chairman); Barry Fadem; (President); Christopher Pearson; (Secretary); Patrick Rosenstiel; (Senior Consultant); Eileen Reavey; (National Grassroots Director); Ted Trimpa; (Consultant); Scott Drexel; Saul Anuzis; Ray Haynes
- Website: www.nationalpopularvote.com

National Popular Vote Inc. is a non-profit organization based in Los Altos, California, launched in 2006 by Barry Fadem and John Koza. Its purpose is "to study, analyze and educate the public regarding its proposed interstate compact providing for the nationwide popular election of the President of the United States," and it developed and champions the National Popular Vote Interstate Compact.

== The proposal ==
The group's website describes their approach as follows: "Nationwide popular election of the President can be implemented if the states join together to pass identical state laws awarding all of their electoral votes to the presidential candidate receiving the most popular votes in all 50 states and the District of Columbia. The proposed state legislation would come into effect only when it has been enacted, in identical form, by enough states to elect a President—that is, by states possessing a majority (270) of the 538 electoral votes."

The group developed and champions the adoption of the National Popular Vote Interstate Compact, which is an agreement among a group of U.S. states and the District of Columbia to award all their electoral votes to whichever presidential candidate wins the overall popular vote in the 50 states and the District of Columbia. The compact is designed to ensure that the candidate who receives the most votes nationwide is elected president, and it would come into effect only when it would guarantee that outcome.

== Progress ==
Within the first several months of its 2006 launch and media campaign, National Popular Vote's proposal began to make progress in various state legislatures. Early action occurred both in large Democratic strongholds California, New York, and Illinois, as well as in medium-sized swing and red states such as Colorado, Missouri, and Louisiana.

As of 2026, 18 states and the District of Columbia have joined the compact; collectively, these jurisdictions control 222 electoral votes, which is 82% of the 270 required for the compact to take effect.

== Advisory committee ==
- Hon. John B. Anderson (IL)
- Hon. Birch Bayh (IN)
- Hon. John Buchanan (AL)
- Hon. Tom Campbell (CA)
- Hon. Tom Downey (NY)
- Hon. David Durenberger (MN)
- Hon. Jake Garn (UT)

== Notable newspaper endorsements ==
- Chicago Sun Times, March 1, 2006
- New York Times, March 14, 2006
- Minneapolis Star Tribune, March 27, 2006
- Sacramento Bee, June 3, 2006
- Los Angeles Times, June 5, 2006
- Miami Herald, November 5, 2008
- Boston Globe, April 19, 2009

== See also ==
- United States Electoral College
