= Chowchilla (disambiguation) =

Chowchilla may refer to:

- Chowchilla, a bird (Orthonyx spaldingii)
- Chowchilla, California, a city in Madera County, California, USA
  - Chowchilla Airport
  - the 1976 Chowchilla kidnapping of a school bus driver and 26 children in Chowchilla, California
- Chowchilla River, a river in Central California and a minor tributary of the San Joaquin River
