= Alview-Dairyland Union School District =

School district in California, United States

- 12861 Avenue 18 1/2 Chowchilla, California, 93610

District information
- Grades: K-8
- Superintendent: Sheila Perry
- NCES District ID: 0602360

Students and staff
- Students: 385

Alview-Dairyland Union School District is a school district headquartered in the campus of Dairyland Elementary School, located in Dairyland, an unincorporated community in Madera County, California, near Chowchilla. In addition to Dairyland Elementary, the district operates Alview Elementary School in the Alview community, also in unincorporated Madera County. Its attendance boundary includes rural areas in the county. It feeds into Chowchilla Union High School District, which operates Chowchilla Union High School.

It originated from a school opened in a private house in September 1915. Prior to the opening students attended school in Chowchilla. The community established a $2,500 bond to establish a two-room schoolhouse.

== Schools ==
Alview School has one building which contains six classrooms. In 2015 Alview School had 177 students; it relies on a school well.
