= 2008 United States presidential election in California =

- November 4, 2008
- Turnout: 79.42% (of registered voters) ▲3.38 pp 59.22% (of eligible voters) ▲2.19 pp

Nominee	Barack Obama	John McCain
Party	Democratic	Republican
Home state	Illinois	Arizona
Running mate	Joe Biden	Sarah Palin
Electoral vote	55	0
Popular vote	8,274,473	5,011,781
Percentage	61.01%	36.95%

Obama
40–50%
50–60%
60–70%
70–80%
80–90%
McCain
50–60%
60–70%
President before election
George W. Bush
Republican
Elected President
Barack Obama
Democratic

The 2008 United States presidential election in California took place on November 4, 2008, in California as part of the 2008 United States presidential election. Voters chose 55 electors, the most out of any of the 50 states, to the Electoral College, who voted for president and vice president.

California was won by Democratic nominee Barack Obama with a 24.1% margin of victory. No Republican has carried the state in a presidential election since George H. W. Bush in 1988. Prior to the election, California was considered to be a state Obama would win or as a safe blue state. With its 55 electoral votes, California was Obama's largest electoral prize in 2008. A number of media outlets called several West Coast states – including California, Hawaii, Oregon, and Washington – for Obama once polls closed in those states. This pushed Obama above the threshold of 270 Electoral College votes needed for victory, and so these outlets declared him president-elect.

As of the 2024 presidential election, this is the last time the Democratic candidate carried Trinity County in a presidential election. This was also the first time since 1936 that a Democratic presidential candidate won more than 60% of the vote in California, which the Democrats have done in every election since, except for 2024.

== Primaries ==
- For other parties, see California state elections, February 2008.

On February 5, 2008, presidential primaries were held by all parties with ballot access in the state.

=== Democratic ===
2008 California Democratic presidential primary
- February 5, 2008

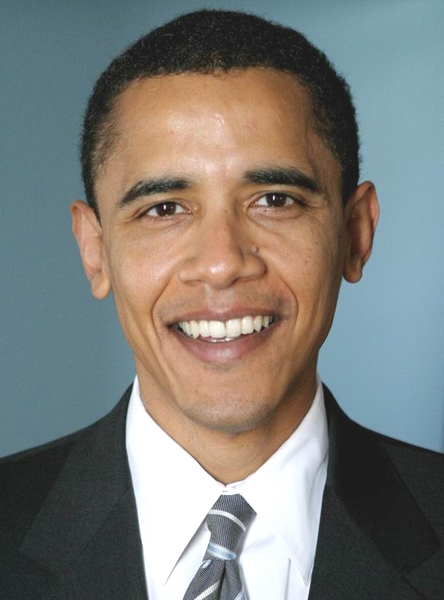
Candidate	Hillary Clinton	Barack Obama
Home state	New York	Illinois
Delegate count	204	166
Popular vote	2,608,184	2,186,662
Percentage	51.47%	43.16%
- Election results by county

The 2008 California Democratic presidential primary took place on February 5, 2008, also known as Super Tuesday. California was dubbed the "Big Enchilada" by the media because it offers the most delegates out of any other delegation. Hillary Clinton won the primary.

==== Process ====
In the primary, 370 of California's 441 delegates to the Democratic National Convention were selected. The remaining delegates were superdelegates not obligated to vote for any candidate at the convention. Of these delegates, 241 were awarded at the congressional district level, and the remaining 129 were awarded to the statewide winner. Candidates were required to receive at least 15% of either the district or statewide vote to receive any delegates. Registered Democrats and Decline to State voters were eligible to vote.

Number of delegates	Congressional districts
3	20, 47
4	2, 3, 11, 16, 18, 19, 21, 22, 25, 26, 31, 32, 34, 38, 39, 40, 41, 42, 43, 44, 45, 46, 48, 49, 51, 52
5	1, 4, 5, 7, 10, 13, 15, 17, 23, 24, 27, 28, 29, 33, 35, 36, 37, 50, 53
6	6, 8, 9, 12, 14, 30

==== Polls ====
The latest six polls were averaged (only counting the latest Zogby poll).

Candidate	Mean of polls released in February 2008	Median of polls released in February 2008	RCP average
Hillary Clinton	42.8%	40.5%	44.2%
Barack Obama	40.3%	40.4%	41.6%

==== Results ====
Key:	Withdrew prior to contest

2008 California Democratic presidential primary
Candidate	Votes	Percentage	National delegates
Hillary Clinton	2,608,184	51.47%	204
Barack Obama	2,186,662	43.16%	166
John Edwards	193,617	3.82%	0
Dennis Kucinich	24,126	0.48%	0
Bill Richardson	19,939	0.39%	0
Joe Biden	18,261	0.36%	0
Mike Gravel	8,184	0.16%	0
Christopher Dodd	8,005	0.16%	0
Willie Carter (write-in)	4	0.00%	0
Eric Hinzman (write-in)	4	0.00%	0
Phil Epstein (write-in)	3	0.00%	0
Brian Calef (write-in)	2	0.00%	0
David Frey (write-in)	1	0.00%	0
Joseph McAndrew (write-in)	1	0.00%	0
Keith Judd (write-in)	0	0.00%	0
John Stein (write-in)	7	0.0000001%	0
Totals	5,066,993	100.00%	370
Voter turnout (Note: Turnout information is not available because Decline to State voters were allowed to participate. There were a total of 6,749,406 eligible registered voters registered with the Democratic Party and 3,043,164 who declined to state.)	—		—

=== Republican ===
2008 California Republican primary
- February 5, 2008
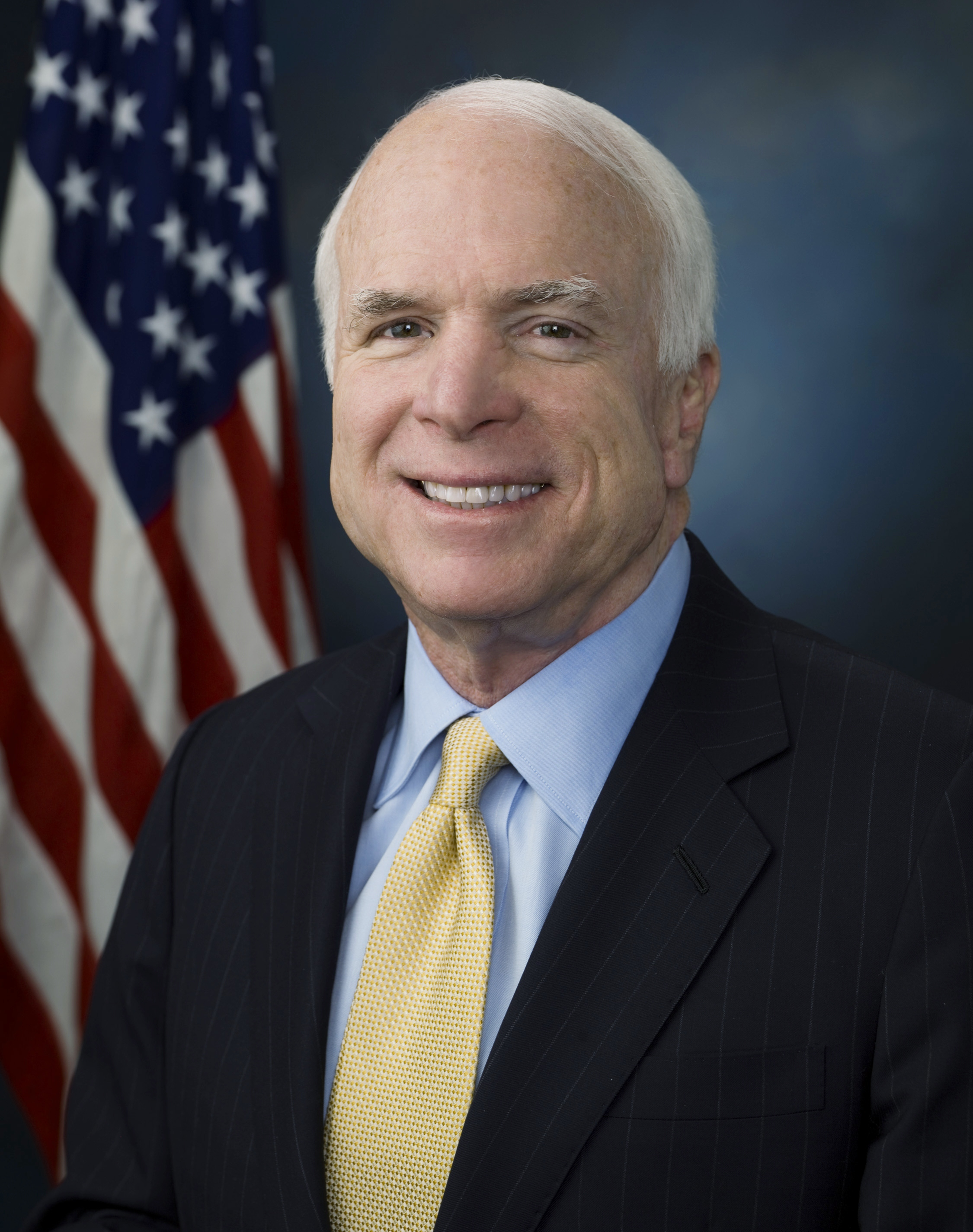

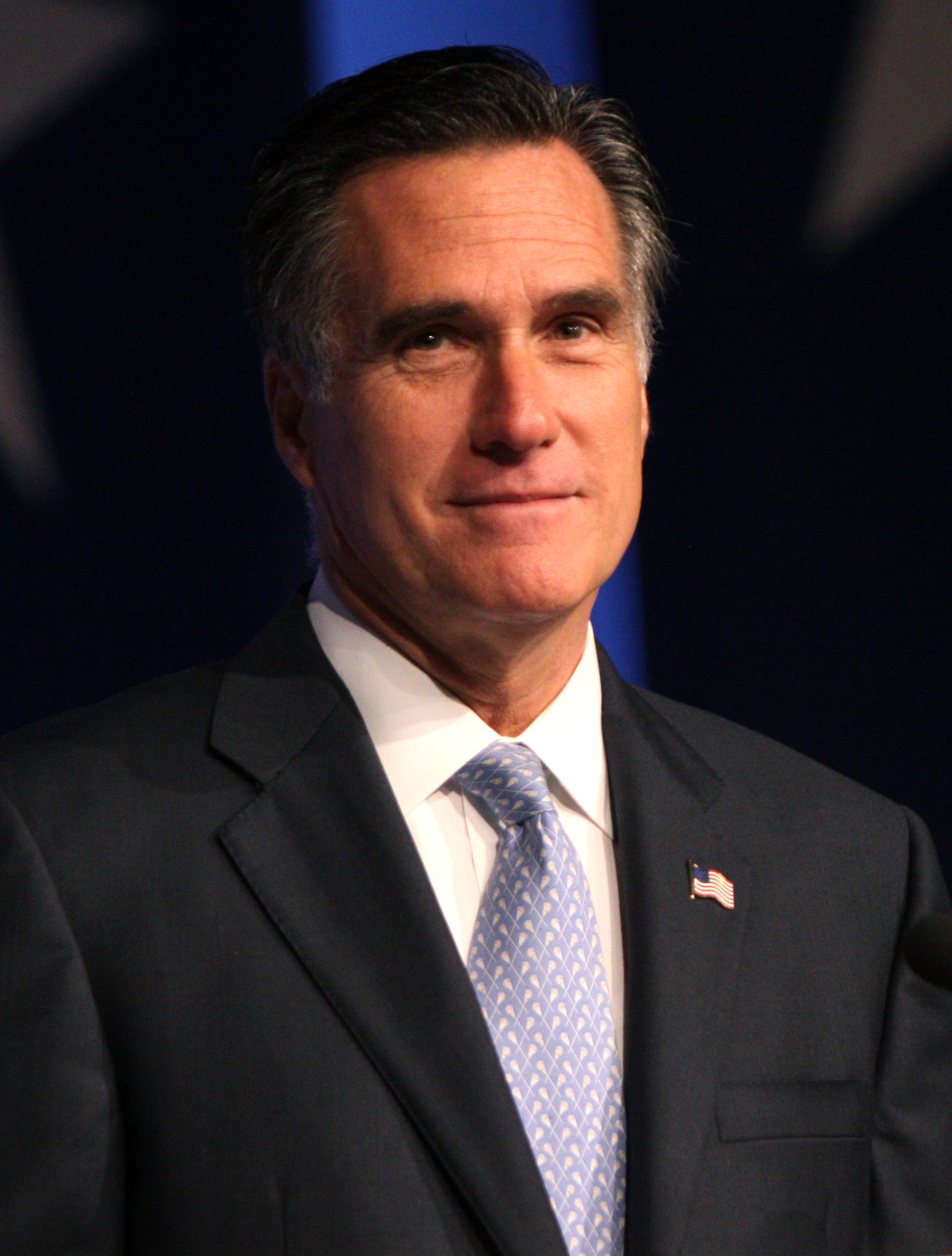

Candidate	John McCain	Mitt Romney	Mike Huckabee
Party	Republican	Republican	Republican
Home state	Arizona	Massachusetts	Arkansas
Popular vote	1,238,988	1,013,471	340,669
Percentage	42.25%	34.56%	11.61%
- Election results by county

The 2008 California Republican primary was held on February 5, 2008, with a total of 173 national delegates at stake.

==== Process ====
The delegates represented California at the Republican National Convention. There were three delegates to every congressional district and fourteen bonus delegates. The winner in each of the 53 congressional districts was awarded all of that district's delegates. The statewide winner was awarded 11 of the 14 bonus delegates, with the 3 remaining delegates assigned to party leaders. Voting in the primary was restricted to registered Republican voters.

==== Polls ====
Early polls showed Rudy Giuliani in the lead. Polls taken closer to the primary either showed Mitt Romney or John McCain as the favored candidate.

==== Results ====
Key:	Withdrew prior to contest

2008 California Republican presidential primary
Candidate	Votes	Percentage	National delegates
John McCain	1,238,988	42.25%	155
Mitt Romney	1,013,471	34.56%	15
Mike Huckabee	340,669	11.62%	0
Rudy Giuliani	128,681	4.39%	0
Ron Paul	125,365	4.27%	0
Fred Thompson	50,275	1.71%	0
Duncan Hunter	14,021	0.48%	0
Alan Keyes	11,742	0.40%	0
John H. Cox	3,219	0.11%	0
Tom Tancredo	3,884	0.13%	0
Sam Brownback	2,486	0.08%	0
Karen Irish (write-in)	6	0.00%	0
Michael Shaw (write-in)	2	0.00%	0
Edward Marshall (write-in)	1	0.00%	0
Joel Neuberg (write-in)	1	0.00%	0
Robert Brickell (write-in)	0	0.00%	0
Brian Calef (write-in)	0	0.00%	0
David Frey (write-in)	0	0.00%	0
Walter Rothnie (write-in)	0	0.00%	0
John Sutherland (write-in)	0	0.00%	0
Uncommitted delegates	3		
Totals	2,932,811	100.00%	173
Voter turnout	56.08%		—

=== American Independent Party ===
The American Independent Party held its primary February 5, 2008

2008 California AIP presidential primary
Candidate	Votes	Percentage
Don J. Grundmann	16,603	36.08%
Dianne Beall Templin	15,302	33.25%
Mad Max Riekse	14,099	30.64%
David Andrew Larson (write-in)	18	0.04%
Totals	46,022	100.00%

=== Green Party ===
The Green Party held its primary February 5, 2008.

2008 California Green Party presidential primary
Candidate	Votes	Percentage	National delegates
Ralph Nader	21,726	60.61%	-
Cynthia McKinney	9,534	26.60%	-
Elaine Brown	1,598	4.46%	-
Kat Swift	1,084	3.02%	-
Kent Mesplay	727	2.03%	-
Jesse Johnson	619	1.73%	-
Jared Ball	556	1.55%	-
Totals	35,844	100.00%	168

=== Libertarian ===
The Libertarian Party held its primary February 5, 2008.

2008 California Libertarian Party presidential primary
Candidate	Votes	Percentage
Christine Smith	4,241	25.16%
Steve Kubby	2,876	17.06%
Wayne Allen Root	2,360	14.00%
Bob Jackson	1,486	8.81%
Barry Hess	891	5.29%
George Phillies	852	5.05%
Michael P. Jingozian	774	4.19%
Robert Milnes	721	4.28%
Daniel Imperato	707	4.19%
John Finan	706	4.19%
Dave Hollist	678	4.02%
Alden Link	565	3.35%
Leon L. Ray (write-in)	1	0.01%
Totals	16,858	100.00%

=== Peace and Freedom ===
The Peace and Freedom Party held its primary February 5, 2008.

2008 California Peace and Freedom Party presidential primary
Candidate	Votes	Percentage
Ralph Nader	2,620	40.66%
Cynthia McKinney	1,385	21.49
Gloria La Riva	1,292	20.05%
Brian P. Moore	335	5.51%
John Crockford	346	5.37%
Stewart A. Alexander	340	5.28%
Stanley Hetz	106	1.64%
Totals	6,444	100.00%

== Campaign ==
=== Predictions ===
Name	Prediction
Associated Press	Likely D
CNN	Safe D
The Cook Political Report	Solid D
CQ Politics	Solid D
D.C. Political Report	Likely D
Electoral-vote.com	Solid D
Fox News	Likely D
The New York Times	Solid D
Politico	Solid D
Real Clear Politics	Solid D
Rasmussen Reports	Safe D
The Takeaway	Solid D

=== Polling ===
Characterized early on as “The Big Enchilada” by some pundits, ultimately Obama won most opinion polls taken prior to the election. Until October 9, his lead ranged from 7 to 15 points in most polls. However, after October 9, his lead expanded to more than 20 consistently. In the final three polls he averaged 59%, while McCain averaged 34%; which is close to the results on election day.

=== Fundraising ===
Obama raised a total of $124,325,459 from the state. McCain raised a total of $26,802,024.

=== Advertising and visits ===
The Obama campaign spent almost $5,570,641. The McCain campaign spent $1,885,142. Obama visited the state six times. McCain visited the state eight times.

== Analysis ==
California was once a Republican leaning swing state, supporting Republican candidates in every election from 1952 through 1988, except in 1964. However, since the 1990s, California has become a reliably Democratic state with a highly diverse ethnic population (mostly Latino) and liberal bastions such as the San Francisco Bay Area and Los Angeles County. The last time the state was won by a Republican candidate was in 1988 by George H. W. Bush.

Obama won by a historic margin, with 61.01% of the votes. Most news organizations called California for Obama as soon as the polls in the state closed. He was projected the winner of the state along with Washington, Hawaii, and Oregon at the same time, whose combined electoral votes caused all news organizations to declare Obama the president-elect. The last time the margin was higher in the state was in 1936 when Franklin D. Roosevelt won with 66.95% of the vote.

In San Francisco and Alameda County (which includes Oakland and Berkeley), four out of five voters backed the Democratic candidate. Elsewhere in the Bay Area, Obama won every county by a three to two margin or greater. In Los Angeles County, Obama won almost 70% of the votes. His combined margin in the Bay Area and Los Angeles County would have been more than enough to carry the state.

Obama also made considerable headway in historically Republican areas of the state. Fresno County, for example, a heavily populated county in the Central Valley, went from giving Bush a 16% margin to a 2% margin for Obama. San Diego County moved from a six-percent margin for Bush to a 10-point margin for Obama—only the second time since World War II that a Democrat has carried this military-dominated county. San Bernardino and Riverside went from double-digit Republican victories to narrow Democratic wins. Ventura County also moved from Republican to Democratic. Orange County, historically one of the most Republican suburban counties in the nation, went from a 21-point margin for Bush to only a 2.5-point margin for McCain. Nevada County voted Democratic for the first time since 1964, and Trinity County did so for the only time since 1976 (although it voted for Ross Perot in 1992).

Voter turnout was also fairly higher than the national average. The 79% turnout of registered voters in the state was the highest since the 1976 presidential election. Despite the Democratic landslide in California, during the same election, a ballot proposition to ban same-sex marriage narrowly passed. A number of counties that had voted for Obama voted yes to it, as it was supported by Hispanics and African Americans. Even though Obama considered marriage to be between a man and a woman at the time, he opposed the "divisive and discriminatory efforts to amend the California Constitution... the U.S. Constitution or those of other states". Arnold Schwarzenegger, the state's Republican governor and a supporter of John McCain, opposed the proposition, though McCain supported it. There was also a proposed ballot proposition called the Presidential Election Reform Act in the state to alter the way the state's electors would be distributed among presidential candidates, but the initiative failed to get onto the ballot.

== Results ==
2008 United States presidential election in California
Party	Candidate	Running mate	Votes	Percentage	Electoral votes
Democratic	Barack Obama	Joe Biden	8,274,473	61.01%	55
Republican	John McCain	Sarah Palin	5,011,781	36.95%	0
Peace and Freedom	Ralph Nader	Matt Gonzalez	108,381	0.80%	0
Libertarian	Bob Barr	Wayne Allyn Root	67,582	0.50%	0
American Independent	Alan Keyes	Brian Rohrbough	40,673	0.30%	0
Green	Cynthia McKinney	Rosa Clemente	38,774	0.29%	0
Independent	Ron Paul (write-in)	Gail Lightfoot	17,006	0.13%	0
Independent	Chuck Baldwin (write-in)	Darrell Castle	3,145	0.02%	0
Independent	James Harris (write-in)	Alyson Kennedy	49	0.00%	0
Independent	Frank Moore (write-in)	Susan Block	36	0.00%	0
Valid votes			13,561,900	98.68%	—
Invalid or blank votes			181,277	1.32%	—
Totals			13,743,177	100.00%	55
Voter turnout			79.42%		—

=== By county ===
County	Barack Obama Democratic		John McCain Republican		Various candidates Other parties		Margin		Total votes cast
County	#	%	#	%	#	%	#	%	Total votes cast
Alameda	489,106	78.76%	119,555	19.25%	12,368	1.99%	369,551	59.51%	621,029
Alpine	422	60.98%	252	36.42%	18	2.60%	170	24.57%	692
Amador	7,813	41.54%	10,561	56.15%	436	2.32%	-2,748	-14.61%	18,810
Butte	49,013	49.85%	46,706	47.50%	2,606	2.65%	2,307	2.35%	98,325
Calaveras	9,813	42.11%	12,835	55.07%	658	2.82%	-3,022	-12.97%	23,306
Colusa	2,569	39.96%	3,733	58.07%	127	1.98%	-1,164	-18.11%	6,429
Contra Costa	306,983	67.97%	136,436	30.21%	8,231	1.82%	170,547	37.76%	451,650
Del Norte	4,323	45.36%	4,967	52.11%	241	2.53%	-644	-6.76%	9,531
El Dorado	40,529	43.61%	50,314	54.14%	2,083	2.24%	-9,785	-10.53%	92,926
Fresno	136,706	50.21%	131,015	48.12%	4,568	1.68%	5,691	2.09%	272,289
Glenn	3,734	37.80%	5,910	59.82%	235	2.38%	-2,176	-22.03%	9,879
Humboldt	39,692	62.28%	21,713	34.07%	2,322	3.64%	17,979	28.21%	63,727
Imperial	24,162	62.24%	14,008	36.08%	650	1.67%	10,154	26.16%	38,820
Inyo	3,743	43.86%	4,523	53.01%	267	3.13%	-780	-9.14%	8,533
Kern	93,457	40.14%	134,793	57.89%	4,600	1.98%	-41,336	-17.75%	232,850
Kings	14,747	42.00%	19,710	56.14%	651	1.85%	-4,963	-14.14%	35,108
Lake	14,854	58.16%	9,935	38.90%	753	2.95%	4,919	19.26%	25,542
Lassen	3,586	31.49%	7,483	65.72%	318	2.79%	-3,897	-34.22%	11,387
Los Angeles	2,295,853	69.19%	956,425	28.82%	65,970	1.99%	1,339,428	40.37%	3,318,248
Madera	17,952	42.38%	23,583	55.68%	820	1.94%	-5,631	-13.29%	42,355
Marin	109,320	77.98%	28,384	20.25%	2,493	1.78%	80,936	57.73%	140,197
Mariposa	4,100	42.48%	5,298	54.90%	253	2.62%	-1,198	-12.41%	9,651
Mendocino	27,843	69.58%	10,721	26.79%	1,452	3.63%	17,122	42.79%	40,016
Merced	34,031	53.33%	28,704	44.98%	1,073	1.68%	5,327	8.35%	63,808
Modoc	1,313	29.71%	2,981	67.44%	126	2.85%	-1,668	-37.74%	4,420
Mono	3,093	55.52%	2,354	42.25%	124	2.23%	739	13.27%	5,571
Monterey	88,453	68.15%	38,797	29.89%	2,533	1.95%	49,656	38.26%	129,783
Napa	38,849	65.14%	19,484	32.67%	1,309	2.19%	19,365	32.47%	59,642
Nevada	28,617	51.43%	25,663	46.12%	1,367	2.46%	2,954	5.31%	55,647
Orange	549,558	47.63%	579,064	50.19%	25,065	2.17%	-29,506	-2.56%	1,153,687
Placer	75,112	43.39%	94,647	54.68%	3,348	1.93%	-19,535	-11.28%	173,107
Plumas	4,715	42.75%	6,035	54.72%	278	2.52%	-1,320	-11.97%	11,028
Riverside	325,017	50.21%	310,041	47.90%	12,241	1.89%	14,976	2.31%	647,299
Sacramento	316,506	58.49%	213,583	39.47%	11,012	2.04%	102,923	19.02%	541,101
San Benito	11,917	60.48%	7,425	37.68%	363	1.84%	4,492	22.80%	19,705
San Bernardino	315,720	52.07%	277,408	45.75%	13,206	2.18%	38,312	6.32%	606,334
San Diego	666,581	54.15%	541,032	43.95%	23,434	1.90%	125,549	10.20%	1,231,047
San Francisco	322,220	84.16%	52,292	13.66%	8,353	2.18%	269,928	70.50%	382,865
San Joaquin	113,974	54.44%	91,607	43.76%	3,768	1.80%	22,367	10.68%	209,349
San Luis Obispo	68,176	51.39%	61,055	46.03%	3,422	2.58%	7,121	5.37%	132,653
San Mateo	222,826	73.47%	75,057	24.75%	5,409	1.78%	147,769	48.72%	303,292
Santa Barbara	105,614	60.38%	65,585	37.50%	3,713	2.12%	40,029	22.89%	174,912
Santa Clara	462,241	69.45%	190,039	28.55%	13,309	2.00%	272,202	40.90%	665,589
Santa Cruz	98,745	77.46%	25,244	19.80%	3,494	2.74%	73,501	57.66%	127,483
Shasta	28,867	35.91%	49,588	61.68%	1,935	2.41%	-20,721	-25.78%	80,390
Sierra	743	37.32%	1,158	58.16%	90	4.52%	-415	-20.84%	1,991
Siskiyou	9,292	43.28%	11,520	53.66%	658	3.06%	-2,228	-10.38%	21,470
Solano	102,095	63.42%	56,035	34.81%	2,843	1.77%	46,060	28.61%	160,973
Sonoma	168,888	73.64%	55,127	24.04%	5,336	2.33%	113,761	49.60%	229,351
Stanislaus	80,279	49.86%	77,497	48.13%	3,239	2.01%	2,782	1.73%	161,015
Sutter	13,412	40.72%	18,911	57.41%	618	1.88%	-5,499	-16.69%	32,941
Tehama	8,945	36.61%	14,843	60.74%	648	2.65%	-5,898	-24.14%	24,436
Trinity	3,233	50.72%	2,940	46.12%	201	3.15%	293	4.60%	6,374
Tulare	43,634	41.47%	59,765	56.81%	1,807	1.72%	-16,131	-15.33%	105,206
Tuolumne	11,532	42.43%	14,988	55.14%	661	2.43%	-3,456	-12.71%	27,181
Ventura	187,601	55.21%	145,853	42.92%	6,346	1.87%	41,748	12.29%	339,800
Yolo	53,488	67.07%	24,592	30.84%	1,669	2.09%	28,896	36.23%	79,749
Yuba	8,866	41.43%	12,007	56.10%	528	2.47%	-3,141	-14.68%	21,401
Total	8,274,473	61.01%	5,011,781	36.95%	275,646	2.03%	3,262,692	24.06%	13,561,900

Counties that flipped from Republican to Democratic

- Butte (largest city: Chico)
- Fresno (largest town: Fresno)
- Nevada (largest town: Truckee)
- Merced (largest community: Merced)
- Riverside (largest city: Riverside)
- San Bernardino (largest town: San Bernardino)
- San Diego (largest community: San Diego)
- San Joaquin (largest city: Stockton)
- San Luis Obispo (largest town: San Luis Obispo)
- Stanislaus (largest community: Modesto)
- Trinity (largest community: Weaverville)
- Ventura (largest city: Oxnard)

=== By congressional district ===
Obama carried 42 of 53 congressional districts in California, including eight districts held by Republicans.

District	McCain	Obama	Representative
1st	32%	66%	Mike Thompson
2nd	55%	43%	Wally Herger
3rd	48.7%	49.2%	Dan Lungren
4th	54%	44%	John Doolittle (110th Congress)
4th	54%	44%	Tom McClintock (111th Congress)
5th	28%	70%	Doris Matsui
6th	22%	76%	Lynn Woolsey
7th	27%	72%	George Miller
8th	12%	85%	Nancy Pelosi
9th	10%	88%	Barbara Lee
10th	33%	65%	Ellen Tauscher
11th	45%	54%	Jerry McNerney
12th	24%	74%	Jackie Speier
13th	24%	74%	Pete Stark
14th	25%	73%	Anna Eshoo
15th	30%	68%	Mike Honda
16th	29%	70%	Zoe Lofgren
17th	26%	72%	Sam Farr
18th	39%	59%	Dennis Cardoza
19th	52%	46%	George Radanovich
20th	39%	60%	Jim Costa
21st	56%	42%	Devin Nunes
22nd	60%	38%	Kevin McCarthy
23rd	32%	66%	Lois Capps
24th	48%	51%	Elton Gallegly
25th	48%	49%	Howard McKeon
26th	47%	51%	David Dreier
27th	32%	66%	Brad Sherman
28th	22%	76%	Howard Berman
29th	30%	68%	Adam Schiff
30th	28%	70%	Henry Waxman
31st	18%	80%	Xavier Becerra
32nd	30%	68%	Hilda Solis
33rd	12%	87%	Diane Watson
34th	23%	75%	Lucille Roybal-Allard
35th	14%	84%	Maxine Waters
36th	34%	64%	Jane Harman
37th	19%	80%	Laura Richardson
38th	27%	71%	Grace Napolitano
39th	32%	65%	Linda Sánchez
40th	51%	47%	Ed Royce
41st	54%	44%	Jerry Lewis
42nd	53%	45%	Gary Miller
43rd	30%	68%	Joe Baca
44th	49%	50%	Ken Calvert
45th	47%	52%	Mary Bono Mack
46th	50%	48%	Dana Rohrabacher
47th	38%	60%	Loretta Sanchez
48th	48.6%	49.3%	John B. T. Campbell III
49th	53%	45%	Darrell Issa
50th	47%	51%	Brian Bilbray
51st	35%	63%	Bob Filner
52nd	53%	45%	Duncan Hunter
53rd	30%	68%	Susan Davis

=== By city ===
By municipality

Official outcome by city and unincorporated areas of counties, of which Obama won 360 and McCain won 176.
City	County	Barack Obama Democratic		John McCain Republican		Various candidates Other parties		Margin		Total Votes	2004 to 2008 Swing %
City	County	#	%	#	%	#	%	#	%	Total Votes	2004 to 2008 Swing %
Alameda	Alameda	27,449	77.39%	7,290	20.55%	731	2.06%	20,159	56.83%	35,470	6.14%
Albany	Alameda	7,767	88.42%	839	9.55%	178	2.03%	6,928	78.87%	8,784	1.72%
Berkeley	Alameda	61,134	92.49%	3,243	4.91%	1,718	2.60%	57,891	87.59%	66,095	3.09%
Dublin	Alameda	11,098	66.07%	5,441	32.39%	259	1.54%	5,657	33.68%	16,798	19.40%
Emeryville	Alameda	4,187	89.41%	399	8.52%	97	2.07%	3,788	80.89%	4,683	5.78%
Fremont	Alameda	52,953	71.12%	20,205	27.14%	1,298	1.74%	32,748	43.98%	74,456	9.80%
Hayward	Alameda	32,983	77.98%	8,590	20.31%	723	1.71%	24,393	57.67%	42,296	7.77%
Livermore	Alameda	21,571	57.25%	15,400	40.87%	706	1.87%	6,171	16.38%	37,677	15.45%
Newark	Alameda	10,838	72.61%	3,837	25.71%	252	1.69%	7,001	46.90%	14,927	8.49%
Oakland	Alameda	151,308	91.24%	11,618	7.01%	2,906	1.75%	139,690	84.24%	165,832	4.36%
Piedmont	Alameda	5,611	78.06%	1,477	20.55%	100	1.39%	4,134	57.51%	7,188	11.64%
Pleasanton	Alameda	20,857	60.15%	13,226	38.14%	591	1.70%	7,631	22.01%	34,674	16.26%
San Leandro	Alameda	24,371	75.49%	7,310	22.64%	602	1.86%	17,061	52.85%	32,283	4.51%
Union City	Alameda	17,419	76.11%	5,091	22.25%	376	1.64%	12,328	53.87%	22,886	5.85%
Unincorporated Area	Alameda	39,560	70.22%	15,589	27.67%	1,187	2.11%	23,971	42.55%	56,336	7.43%
Unincorporated Area	Alpine	422	61.07%	252	36.47%	17	2.46%	170	24.60%	691	15.73%
Amador City	Amador	67	56.30%	51	42.86%	1	0.84%	16	13.45%	119	24.30%
Ione	Amador	623	35.54%	1,107	63.15%	23	1.31%	-484	-27.61%	1,753	11.56%
Jackson	Amador	972	43.94%	1,191	53.84%	49	2.22%	-219	-9.90%	2,212	9.07%
Plymouth	Amador	173	36.89%	284	60.55%	12	2.56%	-111	-23.67%	469	4.73%
Sutter Creek	Amador	714	49.38%	703	48.62%	29	2.01%	11	0.76%	1,446	12.79%
Unincorporated Area	Amador	5,264	41.22%	7,225	56.58%	281	2.20%	-1,961	-15.36%	12,770	10.20%
Biggs	Butte	241	41.06%	337	57.41%	9	1.53%	-96	-16.35%	587	11.93%
Chico	Butte	23,705	61.47%	13,960	36.20%	899	2.33%	9,745	25.27%	38,564	12.66%
Gridley	Butte	959	48.26%	989	49.77%	39	1.96%	-30	-1.51%	1,987	14.33%
Oroville	Butte	2,043	46.42%	2,241	50.92%	117	2.66%	-198	-4.50%	4,401	14.43%
Paradise	Butte	6,023	44.20%	7,236	53.10%	368	2.70%	-1,213	-8.90%	13,627	8.28%
Unincorporated Area	Butte	16,042	41.22%	21,943	56.39%	930	2.39%	-5,901	-15.16%	38,915	6.72%
Angels	Calaveras	832	43.70%	1,031	54.15%	41	2.15%	-199	-10.45%	1,904	19.48%
Unincorporated Area	Calaveras	8,981	42.08%	11,804	55.30%	559	2.62%	-2,823	-13.23%	21,344	8.29%
Colusa	Colusa	795	41.54%	1,088	56.84%	31	1.62%	-293	-15.31%	1,914	16.82%
Williams	Colusa	513	58.03%	360	40.72%	11	1.24%	153	17.31%	884	32.32%
Unincorporated Area	Colusa	1,261	34.84%	2,285	63.14%	73	2.02%	-1,024	-28.30%	3,619	13.62%
Antioch	Contra Costa	24,290	68.88%	10,395	29.48%	580	1.64%	13,895	39.40%	35,265	14.86%
Brentwood	Contra Costa	11,605	56.97%	8,457	41.51%	309	1.52%	3,148	15.45%	20,371	20.04%
Clayton	Contra Costa	3,625	55.07%	2,862	43.48%	96	1.46%	763	11.59%	6,583	17.51%
Concord	Contra Costa	32,517	66.58%	15,414	31.56%	909	1.86%	17,103	35.02%	48,840	11.20%
Danville	Contra Costa	13,628	55.17%	10,774	43.62%	299	1.21%	2,854	11.55%	24,701	16.35%
El Cerrito	Contra Costa	10,868	85.27%	1,596	12.52%	282	2.21%	9,272	72.74%	12,746	3.63%
Hercules	Contra Costa	8,063	77.34%	2,248	21.56%	114	1.09%	5,815	55.78%	10,425	3.87%
Lafayette	Contra Costa	10,092	67.53%	4,581	30.65%	272	1.82%	5,511	36.88%	14,945	15.06%
Martinez	Contra Costa	12,921	68.08%	5,625	29.64%	432	2.28%	7,296	38.44%	18,978	10.42%
Moraga	Contra Costa	5,932	62.93%	3,324	35.26%	171	1.81%	2,608	27.67%	9,427	14.03%
Oakley	Contra Costa	6,955	61.15%	4,207	36.99%	211	1.86%	2,748	24.16%	11,373	16.42%
Orinda	Contra Costa	7,864	67.49%	3,594	30.84%	194	1.66%	4,270	36.65%	11,652	12.30%
Pinole	Contra Costa	6,127	72.24%	2,206	26.01%	148	1.75%	3,921	46.23%	8,481	5.80%
Pittsburg	Contra Costa	14,947	77.45%	4,073	21.10%	280	1.45%	10,874	56.34%	19,300	12.70%
Pleasant Hill	Contra Costa	11,788	69.48%	4,814	28.37%	364	2.15%	6,974	41.11%	16,966	11.69%
Richmond	Contra Costa	30,372	87.95%	3,636	10.53%	527	1.53%	26,736	77.42%	34,535	4.49%
San Pablo	Contra Costa	5,502	86.10%	780	12.21%	108	1.69%	4,722	73.90%	6,390	8.06%
San Ramon	Contra Costa	18,517	62.31%	10,768	36.24%	431	1.45%	7,749	26.08%	29,716	19.07%
Walnut Creek	Contra Costa	24,625	65.33%	12,388	32.87%	679	1.80%	12,237	32.47%	37,692	10.83%
Unincorporated Area	Contra Costa	46,745	64.28%	24,694	33.96%	1,283	1.76%	22,051	30.32%	72,722	10.93%
Crescent City	Del Norte	661	54.40%	519	42.72%	35	2.88%	142	11.69%	1,215	13.11%
Unincorporated Area	Del Norte	3,662	44.04%	4,448	53.49%	206	2.48%	-786	-9.45%	8,316	N/A (Note: Neither major party candidate recorded any votes in 2004.)
Placerville	El Dorado	2,155	49.76%	2,077	47.96%	99	2.29%	78	1.80%	4,331	13.18%
South Lake Tahoe	El Dorado	4,769	67.97%	2,050	29.22%	197	2.81%	2,719	38.75%	7,016	17.98%
Unincorporated Area	El Dorado	33,605	41.30%	46,187	56.76%	1,581	1.94%	-12,582	-15.46%	81,373	13.32%
Clovis	Fresno	15,179	39.15%	23,066	59.50%	522	1.35%	-7,887	-20.34%	38,767	16.98%
Coalinga	Fresno	1,339	43.79%	1,669	54.58%	50	1.64%	-330	-10.79%	3,058	21.27%
Firebaugh	Fresno	840	67.85%	378	30.53%	20	1.62%	462	37.32%	1,238	30.54%
Fowler	Fresno	868	53.15%	740	45.32%	25	1.53%	128	7.84%	1,633	14.81%
Fresno	Fresno	78,046	56.76%	57,221	41.61%	2,239	1.63%	20,825	15.14%	137,506	19.57%
Huron	Fresno	525	86.49%	78	12.85%	4	0.66%	447	73.64%	607	12.24%
Kerman	Fresno	1,608	56.60%	1,199	42.20%	34	1.20%	409	14.40%	2,841	15.87%
Kingsburg	Fresno	1,421	31.49%	3,028	67.11%	63	1.40%	-1,607	-35.62%	4,512	13.21%
Mendota	Fresno	860	75.90%	258	22.77%	15	1.32%	602	53.13%	1,133	20.51%
Orange Cove	Fresno	984	77.73%	278	21.96%	4	0.32%	706	55.77%	1,266	30.80%
Parlier	Fresno	1,403	79.22%	350	19.76%	18	1.02%	1,053	59.46%	1,771	16.47%
Reedley	Fresno	2,892	48.57%	2,955	49.63%	107	1.80%	-63	-1.06%	5,954	20.59%
San Joaquin	Fresno	289	78.96%	74	20.22%	3	0.82%	215	58.74%	366	19.31%
Sanger	Fresno	3,602	61.45%	2,171	37.04%	89	1.52%	1,431	24.41%	5,862	16.24%
Selma	Fresno	3,022	55.74%	2,334	43.05%	66	1.22%	688	12.69%	5,422	16.65%
Unincorporated Area	Fresno	23,828	39.70%	35,216	58.67%	983	1.64%	-11,388	-18.97%	60,027	12.87%
Orland	Glenn	966	44.07%	1,170	53.38%	56	2.55%	-204	-9.31%	2,192	16.37%
Willows	Glenn	779	39.01%	1,174	58.79%	44	2.20%	-395	-19.78%	1,997	11.65%
Unincorporated Area	Glenn	1,989	35.02%	3,566	62.78%	125	2.20%	-1,577	-27.76%	5,680	12.03%
Arcata	Humboldt	7,822	82.05%	1,294	13.57%	417	4.37%	6,528	68.48%	9,533	5.93%
Blue Lake	Humboldt	483	67.93%	205	28.83%	23	3.23%	278	39.10%	711	12.47%
Eureka	Humboldt	7,161	63.17%	3,806	33.57%	369	3.26%	3,355	29.60%	11,336	10.96%
Ferndale	Humboldt	446	53.67%	369	44.40%	16	1.93%	77	9.27%	831	22.80%
Fortuna	Humboldt	2,263	45.13%	2,622	52.29%	129	2.57%	-359	-7.16%	5,014	-0.75%
Rio Dell	Humboldt	554	46.32%	613	51.25%	29	2.42%	-59	-4.93%	1,196	17.86%
Trinidad	Humboldt	173	75.22%	51	22.17%	6	2.61%	122	53.04%	230	7.79%
Unincorporated Area	Humboldt	20,790	60.00%	12,753	36.81%	1,106	3.19%	8,037	23.20%	34,649	6.57%
Brawley	Imperial	3,692	59.14%	2,459	39.39%	92	1.47%	1,233	19.75%	6,243	13.64%
Calexico	Imperial	6,689	82.68%	1,274	15.75%	127	1.57%	5,415	66.93%	8,090	18.71%
Calipatria	Imperial	440	62.15%	244	34.46%	24	3.39%	196	27.68%	708	25.55%
El Centro	Imperial	6,677	61.84%	3,954	36.62%	166	1.54%	2,723	25.22%	10,797	16.96%
Holtville	Imperial	774	54.78%	630	44.59%	9	0.64%	144	10.19%	1,413	10.19%
Imperial	Imperial	2,092	54.04%	1,708	44.12%	71	1.83%	384	9.92%	3,871	26.53%
Westmorland	Imperial	284	63.39%	157	35.04%	7	1.56%	127	28.35%	448	21.17%
Unincorporated Area	Imperial	3,514	48.60%	3,582	49.54%	135	1.87%	-68	-0.94%	7,231	12.26%
Bishop	Inyo	713	50.25%	668	47.08%	38	2.68%	45	3.17%	1,419	16.27%
Unincorporated Area	Inyo	3,030	42.74%	3,855	54.37%	205	2.89%	-825	-11.64%	7,090	10.10%
Arvin	Kern	1,573	71.63%	583	26.55%	40	1.82%	990	45.08%	2,196	21.60%
Bakersfield	Kern	45,242	42.92%	58,602	55.59%	1,570	1.49%	-13,360	-12.67%	105,414	19.73%
California City	Kern	1,459	39.17%	2,178	58.47%	88	2.36%	-719	-19.30%	3,725	22.22%
Delano	Kern	4,618	69.67%	1,917	28.92%	93	1.40%	2,701	40.75%	6,628	16.60%
Maricopa	Kern	66	19.88%	258	77.71%	8	2.41%	-192	-57.83%	332	2.28%
McFarland	Kern	1,218	71.52%	460	27.01%	25	1.47%	758	44.51%	1,703	18.65%
Ridgecrest	Kern	3,580	32.02%	7,330	65.56%	270	2.42%	-3,750	-33.54%	11,180	12.10%
Shafter	Kern	1,583	49.91%	1,548	48.80%	41	1.29%	35	1.10%	3,172	23.02%
Taft	Kern	526	22.99%	1,723	75.31%	39	1.70%	-1,197	-52.32%	2,288	8.15%
Tehachapi	Kern	1,016	33.69%	1,924	63.79%	76	2.52%	-908	-30.11%	3,016	6.14%
Wasco	Kern	1,909	54.92%	1,505	43.30%	62	1.78%	404	11.62%	3,476	17.55%
Unincorporated Area	Kern	30,667	34.37%	56,765	63.62%	1,799	2.02%	-26,098	-29.25%	89,231	11.37%
Avenal	Kings	677	66.18%	326	31.87%	20	1.96%	351	34.31%	1,023	30.96%
Corcoran	Kings	1,472	56.81%	1,053	40.64%	66	2.55%	419	16.17%	2,591	18.03%
Hanford	Kings	6,772	42.04%	9,057	56.23%	278	1.73%	-2,285	-14.19%	16,107	16.81%
Lemoore	Kings	2,768	40.32%	3,986	58.06%	111	1.62%	-1,218	-17.74%	6,865	21.04%
Unincorporated Area	Kings	3,058	36.02%	5,288	62.29%	143	1.68%	-2,230	-26.27%	8,489	12.64%
Clearlake	Lake	2,622	64.28%	1,338	32.80%	119	2.92%	1,284	31.48%	4,079	6.26%
Lakeport	Lake	1,186	57.60%	825	40.07%	48	2.33%	361	17.53%	2,059	16.02%
Unincorporated Area	Lake	11,046	57.11%	7,772	40.18%	523	2.70%	3,274	16.93%	19,341	11.44%
Susanville	Lassen	1,291	34.79%	2,330	62.79%	90	2.43%	-1,039	-28.00%	3,711	9.43%
Unincorporated Area	Lassen	2,295	30.06%	5,153	67.49%	187	2.45%	-2,858	-37.43%	7,635	8.91%
Agoura Hills	Los Angeles	6,560	58.24%	4,505	39.99%	199	1.77%	2,055	18.24%	11,264	11.75%
Alhambra	Los Angeles	17,201	67.06%	7,947	30.98%	503	1.96%	9,254	36.08%	25,651	7.03%
Arcadia	Los Angeles	10,391	49.19%	10,218	48.37%	514	2.43%	173	0.82%	21,123	13.20%
Artesia	Los Angeles	2,790	60.85%	1,690	36.86%	105	2.29%	1,100	23.99%	4,585	19.92%
Avalon	Los Angeles	693	53.80%	550	42.70%	45	3.49%	143	11.10%	1,288	12.94%
Azusa	Los Angeles	7,864	63.70%	4,190	33.94%	292	2.37%	3,674	29.76%	12,346	17.13%
Baldwin Park	Los Angeles	13,478	75.83%	3,934	22.13%	361	2.03%	9,544	53.70%	17,773	11.79%
Bell	Los Angeles	5,384	81.60%	1,077	16.32%	137	2.08%	4,307	65.28%	6,598	12.41%
Bell Gardens	Los Angeles	5,972	83.81%	1,018	14.29%	136	1.91%	4,954	69.52%	7,126	12.07%
Bellflower	Los Angeles	14,137	64.70%	7,221	33.05%	491	2.25%	6,916	31.65%	21,849	18.10%
Beverly Hills	Los Angeles	10,331	59.55%	6,801	39.20%	217	1.25%	3,530	20.35%	17,349	-4.70%
Bradbury	Los Angeles	200	42.74%	265	56.62%	3	0.64%	-65	-13.89%	468	N/A (Note: City had no recorded votes in 2004)
Burbank	Los Angeles	29,083	64.65%	14,953	33.24%	946	2.10%	14,130	31.41%	44,982	16.42%
Calabasas	Los Angeles	7,296	61.58%	4,396	37.10%	156	1.32%	2,900	24.48%	11,848	8.78%
Carson	Los Angeles	27,897	76.30%	8,185	22.39%	478	1.31%	19,712	53.92%	36,560	11.11%
Cerritos	Los Angeles	12,769	55.85%	9,688	42.38%	404	1.77%	3,081	13.48%	22,861	8.63%
Claremont	Los Angeles	11,426	63.68%	6,221	34.67%	296	1.65%	5,205	29.01%	17,943	9.61%
Commerce	Los Angeles	3,211	79.86%	715	17.78%	95	2.36%	2,496	62.07%	4,021	3.10%
Compton	Los Angeles	24,253	94.72%	1,068	4.17%	284	1.11%	23,185	90.55%	25,605	8.68%
Covina	Los Angeles	10,007	55.60%	7,630	42.40%	360	2.00%	2,377	13.21%	17,997	16.56%
Cudahy	Los Angeles	3,094	83.13%	562	15.10%	66	1.77%	2,532	68.03%	3,722	14.14%
Culver City	Los Angeles	16,139	77.72%	4,232	20.38%	394	1.90%	11,907	57.34%	20,765	7.00%
Diamond Bar	Los Angeles	12,274	54.92%	9,658	43.22%	415	1.86%	2,616	11.71%	22,347	14.79%
Downey	Los Angeles	22,062	61.31%	13,142	36.52%	778	2.16%	8,920	24.79%	35,982	14.38%
Duarte	Los Angeles	5,374	64.35%	2,785	33.35%	192	2.30%	2,589	31.00%	8,351	13.30%
El Monte	Los Angeles	15,155	71.73%	5,608	26.54%	365	1.73%	9,547	45.19%	21,128	9.52%
El Segundo	Los Angeles	4,595	51.39%	4,110	45.96%	237	2.65%	485	5.42%	8,942	13.48%
Gardena	Los Angeles	14,975	75.88%	4,435	22.47%	326	1.65%	10,540	53.40%	19,736	12.69%
Glendale	Los Angeles	42,007	65.05%	21,264	32.93%	1,301	2.01%	20,743	32.12%	64,572	13.45%
Glendora	Los Angeles	10,323	43.23%	13,099	54.86%	457	1.91%	-2,776	-11.63%	23,879	14.87%
Hawaiian Gardens	Los Angeles	1,857	69.55%	746	27.94%	67	2.51%	1,111	41.61%	2,670	7.78%
Hawthorne	Los Angeles	19,034	79.49%	4,530	18.92%	380	1.59%	14,504	60.57%	23,944	14.11%
Hermosa Beach	Los Angeles	7,054	61.85%	4,095	35.91%	256	2.24%	2,959	25.94%	11,405	18.83%
Hidden Hills	Los Angeles	580	50.52%	556	48.43%	12	1.05%	24	2.09%	1,148	8.02%
Huntington Park	Los Angeles	8,625	83.12%	1,570	15.13%	182	1.75%	7,055	67.99%	10,377	8.46%
Industry	Los Angeles	16	29.63%	36	66.67%	2	3.70%	-20	-37.04%	54	62.96% (Note: Only 1 recorded vote in 2004)
Inglewood	Los Angeles	35,962	92.83%	2,325	6.00%	452	1.17%	33,637	86.83%	38,739	9.26%
Irwindale	Los Angeles	446	70.35%	173	27.29%	15	2.37%	273	43.06%	634	3.06%
La Canada Flintridge	Los Angeles	5,664	49.06%	5,657	49.00%	225	1.95%	7	0.06%	11,546	10.33%
La Habra Heights	Los Angeles	1,064	36.44%	1,792	61.37%	64	2.19%	-728	-24.93%	2,920	11.59%
La Mirada	Los Angeles	9,873	47.63%	10,408	50.21%	447	2.16%	-535	-2.58%	20,728	14.52%
La Puente	Los Angeles	7,287	74.34%	2,305	23.52%	210	2.14%	4,982	50.83%	9,802	7.05%
La Verne	Los Angeles	7,540	46.83%	8,253	51.25%	309	1.92%	-713	-4.43%	16,102	13.06%
Lakewood	Los Angeles	19,373	54.99%	15,034	42.68%	821	2.33%	4,339	12.32%	35,228	12.98%
Lancaster	Los Angeles	23,299	50.78%	21,649	47.18%	938	2.04%	1,650	3.60%	45,886	24.27%
Lawndale	Los Angeles	6,052	70.75%	2,331	27.25%	171	2.00%	3,721	43.50%	8,554	11.62%
Lomita	Los Angeles	4,433	54.41%	3,525	43.26%	190	2.33%	908	11.14%	8,148	8.44%
Long Beach	Los Angeles	111,326	69.49%	45,570	28.44%	3,316	2.07%	65,756	41.04%	160,212	10.81%
Los Angeles	Los Angeles	931,093	76.32%	265,941	21.80%	22,980	1.88%	665,152	54.52%	1,220,014	10.51%
Lynwood	Los Angeles	12,716	87.76%	1,558	10.75%	216	1.49%	11,158	77.00%	14,490	8.88%
Malibu	Los Angeles	4,762	64.16%	2,531	34.10%	129	1.74%	2,231	30.06%	7,422	9.32%
Manhattan Beach	Los Angeles	11,862	56.63%	8,703	41.55%	380	1.81%	3,159	15.08%	20,945	10.50%
Maywood	Los Angeles	4,348	85.27%	674	13.22%	77	1.51%	3,674	72.05%	5,099	7.44%
Monrovia	Los Angeles	9,189	59.86%	5,817	37.89%	345	2.25%	3,372	21.97%	15,351	13.77%
Montebello	Los Angeles	14,403	73.58%	4,718	24.10%	453	2.31%	9,685	49.48%	19,574	8.40%
Monterey Park	Los Angeles	11,782	64.46%	6,130	33.54%	366	2.00%	5,652	30.92%	18,278	4.02%
Norwalk	Los Angeles	20,339	67.50%	9,136	30.32%	659	2.19%	11,203	37.18%	30,134	13.60%
Palmdale	Los Angeles	24,652	58.16%	16,866	39.79%	865	2.04%	7,786	18.37%	42,383	20.72%
Palos Verdes Estates	Los Angeles	3,652	43.15%	4,681	55.30%	131	1.55%	-1,029	-12.16%	8,464	10.10%
Paramount	Los Angeles	9,447	80.71%	2,024	17.29%	234	2.00%	7,423	63.42%	11,705	15.77%
Pasadena	Los Angeles	42,181	71.87%	15,266	26.01%	1,242	2.12%	26,915	45.86%	58,689	7.76%
Pico Rivera	Los Angeles	15,934	75.51%	4,727	22.40%	441	2.09%	11,207	53.11%	21,102	9.70%
Pomona	Los Angeles	25,774	72.19%	9,261	25.94%	668	1.87%	16,513	46.25%	35,703	16.14%
Rancho Palos Verdes	Los Angeles	10,705	47.58%	11,336	50.38%	460	2.04%	-631	-2.80%	22,501	4.88%
Redondo Beach	Los Angeles	20,703	59.88%	13,083	37.84%	788	2.28%	7,620	22.04%	34,574	12.36%
Rolling Hills	Los Angeles	418	33.60%	805	64.71%	21	1.69%	-387	-31.11%	1,244	10.70%
Rolling Hills Estates	Los Angeles	1,947	42.73%	2,524	55.39%	86	1.89%	-577	-12.66%	4,557	8.01%
Rosemead	Los Angeles	8,297	67.53%	3,768	30.67%	221	1.80%	4,529	36.86%	12,286	2.85%
San Dimas	Los Angeles	7,552	46.94%	8,203	50.99%	333	2.07%	-651	-4.05%	16,088	14.12%
San Fernando	Los Angeles	4,593	77.57%	1,221	20.62%	107	1.81%	3,372	56.95%	5,921	13.08%
San Gabriel	Los Angeles	6,829	61.62%	4,033	36.39%	220	1.99%	2,796	25.23%	11,082	7.40%
San Marino	Los Angeles	2,952	44.44%	3,596	54.14%	94	1.42%	-644	-9.70%	6,642	15.66%
Santa Clarita	Los Angeles	35,379	47.57%	37,422	50.32%	1,564	2.10%	-2,043	-2.75%	74,365	17.68%
Santa Fe Springs	Los Angeles	4,289	68.71%	1,800	28.84%	153	2.45%	2,489	39.88%	6,242	13.45%
Santa Monica	Los Angeles	39,918	79.30%	9,461	18.79%	959	1.91%	30,457	60.50%	50,338	9.12%
Sierra Madre	Los Angeles	3,789	56.12%	2,798	41.44%	165	2.44%	991	14.68%	6,752	8.97%
Signal Hill	Los Angeles	2,962	69.11%	1,231	28.72%	93	2.17%	1,731	40.39%	4,286	11.66%
South El Monte	Los Angeles	3,323	77.51%	874	20.39%	90	2.10%	2,449	57.13%	4,287	8.91%
South Gate	Los Angeles	17,930	80.52%	3,856	17.32%	482	2.16%	14,074	63.20%	22,268	8.66%
South Pasadena	Los Angeles	9,006	68.82%	3,761	28.74%	319	2.44%	5,245	40.08%	13,086	13.23%
Temple City	Los Angeles	6,811	54.79%	5,331	42.89%	288	2.32%	1,480	11.91%	12,430	8.97%
Torrance	Los Angeles	32,591	51.78%	29,039	46.13%	1,314	2.09%	3,552	5.64%	62,944	12.55%
Vernon	Los Angeles	13	36.11%	18	50.00%	5	13.89%	-5	-13.89%	36	-13.89%
Walnut	Los Angeles	7,075	56.18%	5,283	41.95%	235	1.87%	1,792	14.23%	12,593	11.08%
West Covina	Los Angeles	22,641	62.17%	13,079	35.91%	698	1.92%	9,562	26.26%	36,418	11.58%
West Hollywood	Los Angeles	16,524	82.89%	3,057	15.33%	354	1.78%	13,467	67.55%	19,935	1.56%
Westlake Village	Los Angeles	2,604	52.25%	2,298	46.11%	82	1.65%	306	6.14%	4,984	12.37%
Whittier	Los Angeles	18,774	56.02%	13,994	41.76%	746	2.23%	4,780	14.26%	33,514	14.49%
Unincorporated Area	Los Angeles	229,668	67.32%	104,799	30.72%	6,679	1.96%	124,869	36.60%	341,146	19.43%
Chowchilla	Madera	1,115	39.05%	1,684	58.98%	56	1.96%	-569	-19.93%	2,855	16.77%
Madera	Madera	6,187	55.54%	4,783	42.94%	170	1.53%	1,404	12.60%	11,140	22.89%
Unincorporated Area	Madera	10,650	37.64%	17,116	60.50%	526	1.86%	-6,466	-22.85%	28,292	12.68%
Belvedere	Marin	949	65.81%	472	32.73%	21	1.46%	477	33.08%	1,442	16.64%
Corte Madera	Marin	4,411	80.14%	1,002	18.20%	91	1.65%	3,409	61.94%	5,504	8.34%
Fairfax	Marin	4,375	88.54%	441	8.93%	125	2.53%	3,934	79.62%	4,941	5.53%
Larkspur	Marin	5,914	79.02%	1,456	19.45%	114	1.52%	4,458	59.57%	7,484	9.50%
Mill Valley	Marin	7,748	86.21%	1,128	12.55%	111	1.24%	6,620	73.66%	8,987	8.86%
Novato	Marin	18,573	70.68%	7,255	27.61%	451	1.72%	11,318	43.07%	26,279	13.19%
Ross	Marin	1,106	71.22%	431	27.75%	16	1.03%	675	43.46%	1,553	15.95%
San Anselmo	Marin	6,660	85.98%	971	12.54%	115	1.48%	5,689	73.44%	7,746	6.41%
San Rafael	Marin	20,835	78.03%	5,421	20.30%	444	1.66%	15,414	57.73%	26,700	9.70%
Sausalito	Marin	4,031	81.16%	850	17.11%	86	1.73%	3,181	64.04%	4,967	8.93%
Tiburon	Marin	3,540	72.60%	1,275	26.15%	61	1.25%	2,265	46.45%	4,876	11.56%
Unincorporated Area	Marin	30,512	78.89%	7,505	19.40%	660	1.71%	23,007	59.48%	38,677	9.24%
Multiple Districts (Note: From California's Supplement to Statement of Vote: "Marin County uses ballot types that cross supervisorial district lines. These ballot types have been consolidated into a line item called “multiple districts.”)	Marin	666	78.26%	177	20.80%	8	0.94%	489	57.46%	851	N/A
Unincorporated Area	Mariposa	4,100	42.62%	5,298	55.08%	221	2.30%	-1,198	-12.45%	9,619	10.29%
Fort Bragg	Mendocino	2,031	74.23%	628	22.95%	77	2.81%	1,403	51.28%	2,736	12.24%
Point Arena	Mendocino	171	89.06%	16	8.33%	5	2.60%	155	80.73%	192	21.35%
Ukiah	Mendocino	4,073	67.74%	1,766	29.37%	174	2.89%	2,307	38.37%	6,013	16.89%
Willits	Mendocino	1,254	68.79%	509	27.92%	60	3.29%	745	40.87%	1,823	14.13%
Unincorporated Area	Mendocino	20,314	69.65%	7,802	26.75%	1,050	3.60%	12,512	42.90%	29,166	12.07%
Atwater	Merced	3,657	50.01%	3,511	48.02%	144	1.97%	146	2.00%	7,312	23.04%
Dos Palos	Merced	613	49.00%	612	48.92%	26	2.08%	1	0.08%	1,251	17.88%
Gustine	Merced	869	54.55%	701	44.01%	23	1.44%	168	10.55%	1,593	13.66%
Livingston	Merced	1,952	79.84%	467	19.10%	26	1.06%	1,485	60.74%	2,445	25.45%
Los Banos	Merced	5,160	61.39%	3,111	37.01%	134	1.59%	2,049	24.38%	8,405	23.41%
Merced	Merced	11,280	57.40%	8,049	40.96%	323	1.64%	3,231	16.44%	19,652	24.98%
Unincorporated Area	Merced	10,500	45.49%	12,253	53.08%	331	1.43%	-1,753	-7.59%	23,084	19.53%
Alturas	Modoc	458	36.58%	766	61.18%	28	2.24%	-308	-24.60%	1,252	7.51%
Unincorporated Area	Modoc	855	27.26%	2,215	70.61%	67	2.14%	-1,360	-43.35%	3,137	9.21%
Mammoth Lakes	Mono	1,756	64.23%	926	33.87%	52	1.90%	830	30.36%	2,734	13.52%
Unincorporated Area	Mono	1,337	47.13%	1,428	50.33%	72	2.54%	-91	-3.21%	2,837	13.08%
Carmel-by-the-Sea	Monterey	1,685	65.82%	842	32.89%	33	1.29%	843	32.93%	2,560	12.47%
Del Rey Oaks	Monterey	641	68.63%	271	29.01%	22	2.36%	370	39.61%	934	12.71%
Gonzales	Monterey	1,381	78.29%	355	20.12%	28	1.59%	1,026	58.16%	1,764	19.06%
Greenfield	Monterey	1,886	80.81%	416	17.82%	32	1.37%	1,470	62.98%	2,334	17.50%
King City	Monterey	1,255	67.51%	580	31.20%	24	1.29%	675	36.31%	1,859	22.17%
Marina	Monterey	4,824	68.63%	2,077	29.55%	128	1.82%	2,747	39.08%	7,029	16.52%
Monterey	Monterey	8,647	70.88%	3,282	26.90%	271	2.22%	5,365	43.98%	12,200	11.78%
Pacific Grove	Monterey	6,513	74.62%	2,055	23.54%	160	1.83%	4,458	51.08%	8,728	11.92%
Salinas	Monterey	24,999	71.42%	9,428	26.93%	576	1.65%	15,571	44.48%	35,003	21.03%
Sand City	Monterey	68	66.02%	31	30.10%	4	3.88%	37	35.92%	103	25.58%
Seaside	Monterey	6,708	75.35%	2,008	22.56%	186	2.09%	4,700	52.80%	8,902	15.30%
Soledad	Monterey	2,407	79.26%	586	19.30%	44	1.45%	1,821	59.96%	3,037	21.60%
Unincorporated Area	Monterey	27,439	60.79%	16,866	37.36%	836	1.85%	10,573	23.42%	45,141	14.22%
American Canyon	Napa	4,325	68.75%	1,830	29.09%	136	2.16%	2,495	39.66%	6,291	8.66%
Calistoga	Napa	1,437	72.87%	513	26.01%	22	1.12%	924	46.86%	1,972	5.77%
Napa	Napa	21,605	66.59%	10,178	31.37%	663	2.04%	11,427	35.22%	32,446	10.59%
St. Helena	Napa	2,031	69.91%	833	28.67%	41	1.41%	1,198	41.24%	2,905	7.99%
Yountville	Napa	1,227	65.83%	590	31.65%	47	2.52%	637	34.17%	1,864	2.12%
Unincorporated Area	Napa	8,224	58.45%	5,540	39.38%	305	2.17%	2,684	19.08%	14,069	12.70%
Grass Valley	Nevada	3,200	55.32%	2,459	42.51%	126	2.18%	741	12.81%	5,785	18.49%
Nevada City	Nevada	1,314	70.84%	503	27.12%	38	2.05%	811	43.72%	1,855	17.35%
Truckee	Nevada	5,028	67.44%	2,284	30.63%	144	1.93%	2,744	36.80%	7,456	19.15%
Unincorporated Area	Nevada	19,075	47.31%	20,417	50.63%	830	2.06%	-1,342	-3.33%	40,322	11.75%
Aliso Viejo	Orange	10,645	52.80%	9,207	45.67%	310	1.54%	1,438	7.13%	20,162	24.79%
Anaheim	Orange	47,433	51.49%	42,924	46.59%	1,767	1.92%	4,509	4.89%	92,124	21.83%
Brea	Orange	7,625	41.80%	10,287	56.39%	330	1.81%	-2,662	-14.59%	18,242	17.62%
Buena Park	Orange	13,196	53.16%	11,130	44.84%	496	2.00%	2,066	8.32%	24,822	19.05%
Costa Mesa	Orange	20,542	52.12%	17,945	45.53%	925	2.35%	2,597	6.59%	39,412	19.23%
Cypress	Orange	9,894	46.97%	10,775	51.15%	395	1.88%	-881	-4.18%	21,064	15.31%
Dana Point	Orange	8,223	46.61%	9,094	51.55%	325	1.84%	-871	-4.94%	17,642	16.25%
Fountain Valley	Orange	11,277	42.29%	14,864	55.74%	526	1.97%	-3,587	-13.45%	26,667	17.37%
Fullerton	Orange	24,106	48.74%	24,318	49.17%	1,036	2.09%	-212	-0.43%	49,460	17.88%
Garden Grove	Orange	23,754	46.88%	25,939	51.19%	979	1.93%	-2,185	-4.31%	50,672	19.09%
Huntington Beach	Orange	42,622	45.29%	49,528	52.63%	1,949	2.07%	-6,906	-7.34%	94,099	13.75%
Irvine	Orange	48,110	57.39%	34,152	40.74%	1,574	1.88%	13,958	16.65%	83,836	22.28%
La Habra	Orange	9,503	49.47%	9,353	48.69%	352	1.83%	150	0.78%	19,208	17.49%
La Palma	Orange	3,207	48.55%	3,285	49.74%	113	1.71%	-78	-1.18%	6,605	13.91%
Laguna Beach	Orange	8,983	62.69%	5,088	35.51%	258	1.80%	3,895	27.18%	14,329	11.69%
Laguna Hills	Orange	6,557	44.84%	7,812	53.43%	253	1.73%	-1,255	-8.58%	14,622	17.99%
Laguna Niguel	Orange	15,076	46.29%	17,002	52.20%	493	1.51%	-1,926	-5.91%	32,571	17.49%
Laguna Woods	Orange	6,182	51.71%	5,548	46.41%	224	1.87%	634	5.30%	11,954	-1.67%
Lake Forest	Orange	14,937	44.39%	18,034	53.59%	682	2.03%	-3,097	-9.20%	33,653	20.21%
Los Alamitos	Orange	2,436	47.69%	2,557	50.06%	115	2.25%	-121	-2.37%	5,108	10.50%
Mission Viejo	Orange	20,963	43.59%	26,255	54.59%	874	1.82%	-5,292	-11.00%	48,092	18.29%
Newport Beach	Orange	19,479	40.55%	27,767	57.81%	788	1.64%	-8,288	-17.25%	48,034	14.26%
Orange	Orange	23,317	44.50%	28,001	53.43%	1,084	2.07%	-4,684	-8.94%	52,402	18.98%
Placentia	Orange	9,022	43.54%	11,329	54.68%	369	1.78%	-2,307	-11.13%	20,720	16.20%
Rancho Santa Margarita	Orange	9,494	42.95%	12,259	55.46%	353	1.60%	-2,765	-12.51%	22,106	23.01%
San Clemente	Orange	13,293	42.08%	17,716	56.08%	583	1.85%	-4,423	-14.00%	31,592	15.98%
San Juan Capistrano	Orange	6,140	41.64%	8,330	56.49%	275	1.87%	-2,190	-14.85%	14,745	15.29%
Santa Ana	Orange	40,372	65.69%	20,015	32.57%	1,069	1.74%	20,357	33.12%	61,456	23.40%
Seal Beach	Orange	7,090	46.88%	7,733	51.13%	301	1.99%	-643	-4.25%	15,124	5.51%
Stanton	Orange	4,842	53.88%	3,960	44.07%	184	2.05%	882	9.82%	8,986	21.49%
Tustin	Orange	12,553	51.75%	11,254	46.39%	450	1.86%	1,299	5.36%	24,257	22.78%
Villa Park	Orange	1,021	27.43%	2,653	71.28%	48	1.29%	-1,632	-43.85%	3,722	10.42%
Westminster	Orange	13,069	42.18%	17,402	56.17%	510	1.65%	-4,333	-13.99%	30,981	15.47%
Yorba Linda	Orange	11,710	33.81%	22,328	64.46%	598	1.73%	-10,618	-30.66%	34,636	14.71%
Unincorporated Area	Orange	22,885	40.09%	33,220	58.19%	984	1.72%	-10,335	-18.10%	57,089	15.99%
Auburn	Placer	3,719	50.00%	3,534	47.51%	185	2.49%	185	2.49%	7,438	14.47%
Colfax	Placer	389	48.87%	381	47.86%	26	3.27%	8	1.01%	796	19.95%
Lincoln	Placer	8,916	43.16%	11,485	55.60%	256	1.24%	-2,569	-12.44%	20,657	13.79%
Loomis	Placer	1,319	36.52%	2,207	61.10%	86	2.38%	-888	-24.58%	3,612	13.63%
Rocklin	Placer	11,343	42.81%	14,709	55.51%	446	1.68%	-3,366	-12.70%	26,498	18.71%
Roseville	Placer	24,252	44.67%	29,219	53.81%	825	1.52%	-4,967	-9.15%	54,296	16.96%
Unincorporated Area	Placer	25,174	42.33%	33,112	55.68%	1,180	1.98%	-7,938	-13.35%	59,466	12.48%
Portola	Plumas	393	45.07%	440	50.46%	39	4.47%	-47	-5.39%	872	10.58%
Unincorporated Area	Plumas	4,322	42.56%	5,595	55.10%	237	2.33%	-1,273	-12.54%	10,154	13.05%
Banning	Riverside	4,854	46.61%	5,369	51.56%	190	1.82%	-515	-4.95%	10,413	9.61%
Beaumont	Riverside	4,854	47.28%	5,232	50.96%	181	1.76%	-378	-3.68%	10,267	20.63%
Blythe	Riverside	1,597	47.67%	1,681	50.18%	72	2.15%	-84	-2.51%	3,350	10.36%
Calimesa	Riverside	1,305	36.81%	2,172	61.27%	68	1.92%	-867	-24.46%	3,545	3.54%
Canyon Lake	Riverside	1,574	30.25%	3,572	68.64%	58	1.11%	-1,998	-38.39%	5,204	11.84%
Cathedral City	Riverside	8,507	62.36%	4,946	36.26%	189	1.39%	3,561	26.10%	13,642	17.71%
Coachella	Riverside	4,179	84.07%	733	14.75%	59	1.19%	3,446	69.32%	4,971	19.86%
Corona	Riverside	22,645	48.81%	22,962	49.49%	789	1.70%	-317	-0.68%	46,396	22.03%
Desert Hot Springs	Riverside	3,209	60.14%	2,036	38.16%	91	1.71%	1,173	21.98%	5,336	21.38%
Hemet	Riverside	11,191	44.34%	13,583	53.82%	465	1.84%	-2,392	-9.48%	25,239	12.43%
Indian Wells	Riverside	851	31.65%	1,804	67.09%	34	1.26%	-953	-35.44%	2,689	11.40%
Indio	Riverside	10,795	58.16%	7,521	40.52%	246	1.33%	3,274	17.64%	18,562	13.98%
La Quinta	Riverside	6,475	42.95%	8,402	55.73%	199	1.32%	-1,927	-12.78%	15,076	17.59%
Lake Elsinore	Riverside	6,051	50.74%	5,649	47.37%	225	1.89%	402	3.37%	11,925	28.66%
Moreno Valley	Riverside	32,205	65.56%	16,141	32.86%	774	1.58%	16,064	32.70%	49,120	26.54%
Murrieta	Riverside	14,573	40.01%	21,306	58.49%	548	1.50%	-6,733	-18.48%	36,427	21.53%
Norco	Riverside	3,114	34.27%	5,815	64.00%	157	1.73%	-2,701	-29.73%	9,086	12.02%
Palm Desert	Riverside	9,212	45.32%	10,825	53.26%	289	1.42%	-1,613	-7.94%	20,326	13.37%
Palm Springs	Riverside	13,133	67.65%	6,012	30.97%	269	1.39%	7,121	36.68%	19,414	11.32%
Perris	Riverside	8,016	72.14%	2,946	26.51%	149	1.34%	5,070	45.63%	11,111	30.12%
Rancho Mirage	Riverside	4,024	46.08%	4,627	52.99%	81	0.93%	-603	-6.91%	8,732	9.23%
Riverside	Riverside	50,510	56.08%	37,621	41.77%	1,935	2.15%	12,889	14.31%	90,066	19.67%
San Jacinto	Riverside	5,052	50.22%	4,817	47.88%	191	1.90%	235	2.34%	10,060	23.64%
Temecula	Riverside	14,209	40.65%	20,231	57.87%	518	1.48%	-6,022	-17.23%	34,958	21.45%
Wildomar	Riverside	4,094	39.24%	6,092	58.40%	246	2.36%	-1,998	-19.15%	10,432	N/A (Note: City not incorporated during 2004 Election)
Unincorporated Area	Riverside	78,788	46.37%	87,946	51.76%	3,193	1.88%	-9,158	-5.39%	169,927	19.11%
Citrus Heights	Sacramento	15,677	46.11%	17,634	51.86%	691	2.03%	-1,957	-5.76%	34,002	16.15%
Elk Grove	Sacramento	33,918	57.80%	23,858	40.66%	902	1.54%	10,060	17.14%	58,678	24.41%
Folsom	Sacramento	14,020	45.24%	16,492	53.21%	481	1.55%	-2,472	-7.98%	30,993	19.27%
Galt	Sacramento	3,580	46.85%	3,916	51.24%	146	1.91%	-336	-4.40%	7,642	20.05%
Isleton	Sacramento	187	60.13%	116	37.30%	8	2.57%	71	22.83%	311	12.61%
Rancho Cordova	Sacramento	12,285	56.39%	9,083	41.70%	416	1.91%	3,202	14.70%	21,784	18.58%
Sacramento	Sacramento	120,961	72.23%	43,214	25.81%	3,281	1.96%	77,747	46.43%	167,456	16.66%
Unincorporated Area	Sacramento	115,878	52.80%	99,270	45.23%	4,321	1.97%	16,608	7.57%	219,469	17.69%
Hollister	San Benito	7,324	67.78%	3,293	30.48%	188	1.74%	4,031	37.31%	10,805	18.94%
San Juan Bautista	San Benito	507	67.06%	229	30.29%	20	2.65%	278	36.77%	756	10.12%
Unincorporated Area	San Benito	4,086	50.17%	3,903	47.92%	155	1.90%	183	2.25%	8,144	14.06%
Adelanto	San Bernardino	3,293	64.25%	1,708	33.33%	124	2.42%	1,585	30.93%	5,125	36.31%
Apple Valley	San Bernardino	9,458	36.44%	15,972	61.53%	527	2.03%	-6,514	-25.10%	25,957	13.97%
Barstow	San Bernardino	3,018	49.11%	2,960	48.17%	167	2.72%	58	0.94%	6,145	15.28%
Big Bear Lake	San Bernardino	955	35.88%	1,641	61.65%	66	2.48%	-686	-25.77%	2,662	9.79%
Chino	San Bernardino	12,089	51.98%	10,803	46.45%	364	1.57%	1,286	5.53%	23,256	16.51%
Chino Hills	San Bernardino	14,556	47.99%	15,320	50.51%	454	1.50%	-764	-2.52%	30,330	16.98%
Colton	San Bernardino	8,905	68.11%	3,846	29.42%	323	2.47%	5,059	38.70%	13,074	15.55%
Fontana	San Bernardino	30,644	67.11%	14,195	31.09%	825	1.81%	16,449	36.02%	45,664	22.27%
Grand Terrace	San Bernardino	2,415	48.41%	2,456	49.23%	118	2.37%	-41	-0.82%	4,989	14.42%
Hesperia	San Bernardino	9,867	41.09%	13,608	56.67%	538	2.24%	-3,741	-15.58%	24,013	20.21%
Highland	San Bernardino	8,535	52.82%	7,358	45.53%	266	1.65%	1,177	7.28%	16,159	17.38%
Loma Linda	San Bernardino	3,868	49.65%	3,768	48.36%	155	1.99%	100	1.28%	7,791	16.41%
Montclair	San Bernardino	5,648	64.41%	2,955	33.70%	166	1.89%	2,693	30.71%	8,769	18.07%
Needles	San Bernardino	685	46.57%	728	49.49%	58	3.94%	-43	-2.92%	1,471	4.61%
Ontario	San Bernardino	25,287	62.26%	14,626	36.01%	705	1.74%	10,661	26.25%	40,618	21.15%
Rancho Cucamonga	San Bernardino	31,796	49.49%	31,289	48.70%	1,158	1.80%	507	0.79%	64,243	20.58%
Redlands	San Bernardino	14,493	48.15%	14,939	49.63%	670	2.23%	-446	-1.48%	30,102	14.26%
Rialto	San Bernardino	17,995	72.84%	6,265	25.36%	446	1.81%	11,730	47.48%	24,706	21.68%
San Bernardino	San Bernardino	31,250	64.60%	16,077	33.23%	1,049	2.17%	15,173	31.36%	48,376	17.75%
Twentynine Palms	San Bernardino	1,731	40.00%	2,494	57.62%	103	2.38%	-763	-17.63%	4,328	16.51%
Upland	San Bernardino	14,606	48.76%	14,752	49.25%	595	1.99%	-146	-0.49%	29,953	16.14%
Victorville	San Bernardino	14,478	53.89%	11,855	44.13%	532	1.98%	2,623	9.76%	26,865	27.80%
Yucaipa	San Bernardino	7,652	37.13%	12,549	60.89%	408	1.98%	-4,897	-23.76%	20,609	9.82%
Yucca Valley	San Bernardino	2,920	37.68%	4,650	60.00%	180	2.32%	-1,730	-22.32%	7,750	10.22%
Unincorporated Area	San Bernardino	39,576	42.81%	50,594	54.72%	2,284	2.47%	-11,018	-11.92%	92,454	11.74%
Carlsbad	San Diego	26,668	49.39%	26,443	48.98%	881	1.63%	225	0.42%	53,992	14.89%
Chula Vista	San Diego	48,273	59.48%	31,777	39.16%	1,105	1.36%	16,496	20.33%	81,155	21.49%
Coronado	San Diego	3,855	41.73%	5,260	56.94%	123	1.33%	-1,405	-15.21%	9,238	11.47%
Del Mar	San Diego	1,796	63.51%	986	34.87%	46	1.63%	810	28.64%	2,828	13.97%
El Cajon	San Diego	14,579	46.59%	16,209	51.80%	502	1.60%	-1,630	-5.21%	31,290	18.67%
Encinitas	San Diego	20,597	61.15%	12,459	36.99%	627	1.86%	8,138	24.16%	33,683	13.94%
Escondido	San Diego	19,616	45.10%	23,081	53.07%	798	1.83%	-3,465	-7.97%	43,495	19.78%
Imperial Beach	San Diego	4,522	57.61%	3,161	40.27%	167	2.13%	1,361	17.34%	7,850	18.28%
La Mesa	San Diego	14,837	55.69%	11,316	42.48%	487	1.83%	3,521	13.22%	26,640	15.66%
Lemon Grove	San Diego	5,578	58.45%	3,795	39.76%	171	1.79%	1,783	18.68%	9,544	17.80%
National City	San Diego	7,988	64.88%	4,106	33.35%	218	1.77%	3,882	31.53%	12,312	13.74%
Oceanside	San Diego	32,213	50.30%	30,624	47.82%	1,204	1.88%	1,589	2.48%	64,041	16.56%
Poway	San Diego	9,931	40.30%	14,308	58.06%	406	1.65%	-4,377	-17.76%	24,645	14.61%
San Diego	San Diego	335,724	62.57%	191,711	35.73%	9,086	1.69%	144,013	26.84%	536,521	15.69%
San Marcos	San Diego	14,236	48.48%	14,601	49.72%	530	1.80%	-365	-1.24%	29,367	19.71%
Santee	San Diego	9,743	39.40%	14,583	58.98%	401	1.62%	-4,840	-19.57%	24,727	14.81%
Solana Beach	San Diego	4,208	56.55%	3,115	41.86%	118	1.59%	1,093	14.69%	7,441	14.48%
Vista	San Diego	13,692	48.84%	13,750	49.05%	590	2.10%	-58	-0.21%	28,032	20.78%
Unincorporated Area	San Diego	78,525	38.95%	119,747	59.39%	3,346	1.66%	-41,222	-20.45%	201,618	13.83%
San Francisco	San Francisco	322,220	84.26%	52,292	13.67%	7,899	2.07%	269,928	70.59%	382,411	2.48%
Escalon	San Joaquin	1,132	38.22%	1,772	59.82%	58	1.96%	-640	-21.61%	2,962	16.13%
Lathrop	San Joaquin	2,615	64.94%	1,358	33.72%	54	1.34%	1,257	31.21%	4,027	22.54%
Lodi	San Joaquin	9,157	40.81%	12,846	57.25%	434	1.93%	-3,689	-16.44%	22,437	16.71%
Manteca	San Joaquin	10,912	51.76%	9,699	46.00%	472	2.24%	1,213	5.75%	21,083	19.34%
Ripon	San Joaquin	2,044	32.07%	4,223	66.26%	106	1.66%	-2,179	-34.19%	6,373	17.74%
Stockton	San Joaquin	52,199	64.99%	26,880	33.47%	1,235	1.54%	25,319	31.53%	80,314	18.49%
Tracy	San Joaquin	15,236	61.07%	9,395	37.66%	319	1.28%	5,841	23.41%	24,950	21.28%
Unincorporated Area	San Joaquin	20,679	43.99%	25,434	54.10%	897	1.91%	-4,755	-10.11%	47,010	14.13%
Arroyo Grande	San Luis Obispo	4,629	48.02%	4,843	50.24%	168	1.74%	-214	-2.22%	9,640	12.51%
Atascadero	San Luis Obispo	6,477	46.23%	7,223	51.56%	309	2.21%	-746	-5.33%	14,009	13.53%
El Paso de Robles	San Luis Obispo	5,476	44.21%	6,692	54.02%	219	1.77%	-1,216	-9.82%	12,387	17.85%
Grover Beach	San Luis Obispo	2,829	53.01%	2,366	44.33%	142	2.66%	463	8.68%	5,337	10.98%
Morro Bay	San Luis Obispo	3,611	58.95%	2,344	38.26%	171	2.79%	1,267	20.68%	6,126	9.10%
Pismo Beach	San Luis Obispo	2,476	50.49%	2,328	47.47%	100	2.04%	148	3.02%	4,904	9.11%
San Luis Obispo	San Luis Obispo	15,550	67.11%	7,034	30.36%	586	2.53%	8,516	36.75%	23,170	16.34%
Unincorporated Area	San Luis Obispo	27,128	47.98%	28,225	49.92%	1,192	2.11%	-1,097	-1.94%	56,545	11.75%
Atherton	San Mateo	2,501	57.59%	1,787	41.15%	55	1.27%	714	16.44%	4,343	18.71%
Belmont	San Mateo	9,620	73.36%	3,240	24.71%	253	1.93%	6,380	48.65%	13,113	8.27%
Brisbane	San Mateo	1,639	79.41%	377	18.27%	48	2.33%	1,262	61.14%	2,064	1.14%
Burlingame	San Mateo	10,086	72.33%	3,645	26.14%	213	1.53%	6,441	46.19%	13,944	10.93%
Colma	San Mateo	400	78.74%	96	18.90%	12	2.36%	304	59.84%	508	1.78%
Daly City	San Mateo	22,711	74.85%	7,194	23.71%	435	1.43%	15,517	51.14%	30,340	0.01%
East Palo Alto	San Mateo	5,510	91.56%	427	7.10%	81	1.35%	5,083	84.46%	6,018	6.20%
Foster City	San Mateo	9,703	71.43%	3,704	27.27%	177	1.30%	5,999	44.16%	13,584	9.45%
Half Moon Bay	San Mateo	3,967	70.39%	1,566	27.79%	103	1.83%	2,401	42.60%	5,636	10.59%
Hillsborough	San Mateo	3,531	56.30%	2,668	42.54%	73	1.16%	863	13.76%	6,272	18.40%
Menlo Park	San Mateo	12,178	76.70%	3,462	21.80%	238	1.50%	8,716	54.89%	15,878	11.15%
Millbrae	San Mateo	6,477	67.27%	2,997	31.12%	155	1.61%	3,480	36.14%	9,629	6.75%
Pacifica	San Mateo	14,766	75.91%	4,315	22.18%	370	1.90%	10,451	53.73%	19,451	5.59%
Portola Valley	San Mateo	2,045	69.13%	858	29.01%	55	1.86%	1,187	40.13%	2,958	13.10%
Redwood City	San Mateo	22,609	74.53%	7,149	23.57%	579	1.91%	15,460	50.96%	30,337	12.76%
San Bruno	San Mateo	12,315	74.56%	3,958	23.96%	243	1.47%	8,357	50.60%	16,516	5.99%
San Carlos	San Mateo	11,695	71.45%	4,400	26.88%	274	1.67%	7,295	44.57%	16,369	10.54%
San Mateo	San Mateo	30,605	73.62%	10,298	24.77%	669	1.61%	20,307	48.85%	41,572	9.75%
South San Francisco	San Mateo	16,805	75.48%	5,127	23.03%	333	1.50%	11,678	52.45%	22,265	3.92%
Woodside	San Mateo	2,165	63.56%	1,199	35.20%	42	1.23%	966	28.36%	3,406	15.49%
Unincorporated Area	San Mateo	21,498	75.05%	6,590	23.01%	557	1.94%	14,908	52.04%	28,645	8.21%
Buellton	Santa Barbara	1,113	50.66%	1,038	47.25%	46	2.09%	75	3.41%	2,197	20.58%
Carpinteria	Santa Barbara	3,848	65.83%	1,884	32.23%	113	1.93%	1,964	33.60%	5,845	13.65%
Goleta	Santa Barbara	9,432	65.13%	4,739	32.72%	311	2.15%	4,693	32.41%	14,482	13.73%
Guadalupe	Santa Barbara	1,046	71.25%	393	26.77%	29	1.98%	653	44.48%	1,468	23.97%
Lompoc	Santa Barbara	6,259	51.22%	5,711	46.74%	249	2.04%	548	4.48%	12,219	20.01%
Santa Barbara	Santa Barbara	31,449	75.25%	9,556	22.86%	790	1.89%	21,893	52.38%	41,795	11.90%
Santa Maria	Santa Barbara	11,071	50.20%	10,609	48.11%	373	1.69%	462	2.09%	22,053	18.79%
Solvang	Santa Barbara	1,301	46.76%	1,422	51.11%	59	2.12%	-121	-4.35%	2,782	16.43%
Unincorporated Area	Santa Barbara	40,095	55.94%	30,233	42.18%	1,341	1.87%	9,862	13.76%	71,669	14.89%
Campbell	Santa Clara	11,921	69.08%	4,964	28.77%	372	2.16%	6,957	40.31%	17,257	12.80%
Cupertino	Santa Clara	16,365	70.61%	6,369	27.48%	442	1.91%	9,996	43.13%	23,176	11.05%
Gilroy	Santa Clara	10,343	67.13%	4,787	31.07%	278	1.80%	5,556	36.06%	15,408	14.64%
Los Altos	Santa Clara	11,915	68.15%	5,260	30.09%	308	1.76%	6,655	38.07%	17,483	12.76%
Los Altos Hills	Santa Clara	3,232	62.62%	1,842	35.69%	87	1.69%	1,390	26.93%	5,161	14.83%
Los Gatos	Santa Clara	11,093	66.31%	5,371	32.11%	265	1.58%	5,722	34.20%	16,729	13.90%
Milpitas	Santa Clara	13,580	65.87%	6,714	32.57%	321	1.56%	6,866	33.31%	20,615	10.29%
Monte Sereno	Santa Clara	1,297	59.36%	852	38.99%	36	1.65%	445	20.37%	2,185	14.66%
Morgan Hill	Santa Clara	9,635	60.71%	5,920	37.30%	315	1.98%	3,715	23.41%	15,870	15.52%
Mountain View	Santa Clara	23,025	76.99%	6,171	20.64%	709	2.37%	16,854	56.36%	29,905	8.64%
Palo Alto	Santa Clara	27,322	80.16%	6,128	17.98%	634	1.86%	21,194	62.18%	34,084	5.44%
San Jose	Santa Clara	222,623	69.23%	93,478	29.07%	5,477	1.70%	129,145	40.16%	321,578	12.54%
Santa Clara	Santa Clara	27,787	70.83%	10,563	26.92%	882	2.25%	17,224	43.90%	39,232	9.79%
Saratoga	Santa Clara	10,578	61.77%	6,268	36.60%	280	1.63%	4,310	25.17%	17,126	13.79%
Sunnyvale	Santa Clara	34,767	71.47%	12,817	26.35%	1,059	2.18%	21,950	45.12%	48,643	9.69%
Unincorporated Area	Santa Clara	26,758	66.76%	12,535	31.27%	790	1.97%	14,223	35.48%	40,083	11.30%
Capitola	Santa Cruz	4,162	77.63%	1,066	19.88%	133	2.48%	3,096	57.75%	5,361	9.78%
Santa Cruz	Santa Cruz	28,570	86.62%	3,555	10.78%	858	2.60%	25,015	75.84%	32,983	6.29%
Scotts Valley	Santa Cruz	4,106	63.74%	2,207	34.26%	129	2.00%	1,899	29.48%	6,442	13.63%
Watsonville	Santa Cruz	9,172	80.49%	2,044	17.94%	179	1.57%	7,128	62.55%	11,395	15.98%
Unincorporated Area	Santa Cruz	52,735	74.42%	16,372	23.10%	1,758	2.48%	36,363	51.31%	70,865	9.75%
Anderson	Shasta	1,293	40.63%	1,803	56.66%	86	2.70%	-510	-16.03%	3,182	9.98%
Redding	Shasta	14,622	37.44%	23,662	60.59%	766	1.96%	-9,040	-23.15%	39,050	10.66%
Shasta Lake	Shasta	1,584	39.89%	2,265	57.04%	122	3.07%	-681	-17.15%	3,971	8.62%
Unincorporated Area	Shasta	11,368	33.45%	21,858	64.31%	760	2.24%	-10,490	-30.87%	33,986	9.67%
Loyalton	Sierra	139	35.92%	231	59.69%	17	4.39%	-92	-23.77%	387	15.58%
Unincorporated Area	Sierra	604	38.18%	927	58.60%	51	3.22%	-323	-20.42%	1,582	8.61%
Dorris	Siskiyou	80	29.09%	184	66.91%	11	4.00%	-104	-37.82%	275	9.58%
Dunsmuir	Siskiyou	479	60.10%	285	35.76%	33	4.14%	194	24.34%	797	6.76%
Etna	Siskiyou	132	33.17%	248	62.31%	18	4.52%	-116	-29.15%	398	11.38%
Fort Jones	Siskiyou	95	33.22%	183	63.99%	8	2.80%	-88	-30.77%	286	11.61%
Montague	Siskiyou	161	29.70%	372	68.63%	9	1.66%	-211	-38.93%	542	16.73%
Mt. Shasta	Siskiyou	1,138	64.11%	585	32.96%	52	2.93%	553	31.15%	1,775	14.32%
Tulelake	Siskiyou	74	33.33%	145	65.32%	3	1.35%	-71	-31.98%	222	13.12%
Weed	Siskiyou	618	61.13%	367	36.30%	26	2.57%	251	24.83%	1,011	12.34%
Yreka	Siskiyou	1,340	40.22%	1,906	57.20%	86	2.58%	-566	-16.99%	3,332	17.18%
Unincorporated Area	Siskiyou	5,175	40.58%	7,245	56.81%	334	2.62%	-2,070	-16.23%	12,754	11.81%
Benicia	Solano	9,934	65.64%	4,895	32.35%	304	2.01%	5,039	33.30%	15,133	11.05%
Dixon	Solano	3,729	52.98%	3,168	45.01%	142	2.02%	561	7.97%	7,039	17.80%
Fairfield	Solano	23,222	63.79%	12,590	34.58%	593	1.63%	10,632	29.20%	36,405	17.81%
Rio Vista	Solano	2,126	53.58%	1,778	44.81%	64	1.61%	348	8.77%	3,968	14.28%
Suisun City	Solano	6,869	69.96%	2,797	28.49%	153	1.56%	4,072	41.47%	9,819	16.79%
Vacaville	Solano	19,214	53.84%	15,842	44.39%	631	1.77%	3,372	9.45%	35,687	15.80%
Vallejo	Solano	33,055	75.12%	10,346	23.51%	604	1.37%	22,709	51.61%	44,005	6.46%
Unincorporated Area	Solano	3,946	45.06%	4,619	52.74%	193	2.20%	-673	-7.68%	8,758	10.47%
Cloverdale	Sonoma	2,571	68.84%	1,090	29.18%	74	1.98%	1,481	39.65%	3,735	15.53%
Cotati	Sonoma	2,827	76.84%	761	20.68%	91	2.47%	2,066	56.16%	3,679	9.44%
Healdsburg	Sonoma	4,150	74.24%	1,324	23.69%	116	2.08%	2,826	50.55%	5,590	14.19%
Petaluma	Sonoma	21,144	74.27%	6,712	23.58%	614	2.16%	14,432	50.69%	28,470	13.46%
Rohnert Park	Sonoma	12,833	72.79%	4,423	25.09%	374	2.12%	8,410	47.70%	17,630	15.47%
Santa Rosa	Sonoma	53,724	74.64%	16,759	23.29%	1,490	2.07%	36,965	51.36%	71,973	14.78%
Sebastopol	Sonoma	3,791	85.06%	550	12.34%	116	2.60%	3,241	72.72%	4,457	12.07%
Sonoma	Sonoma	4,524	74.13%	1,488	24.38%	91	1.49%	3,036	49.75%	6,103	10.19%
Windsor	Sonoma	8,073	67.53%	3,680	30.78%	202	1.69%	4,393	36.75%	11,955	18.75%
Unincorporated Area	Sonoma	55,251	73.26%	18,340	24.32%	1,825	2.42%	36,911	48.94%	75,416	10.96%
Ceres	Stanislaus	6,559	57.48%	4,649	40.74%	203	1.78%	1,910	16.74%	11,411	26.80%
Hughson	Stanislaus	949	40.80%	1,329	57.14%	48	2.06%	-380	-16.34%	2,326	19.15%
Modesto	Stanislaus	36,122	52.77%	31,090	45.41%	1,246	1.82%	5,032	7.35%	68,458	19.78%
Newman	Stanislaus	1,386	57.39%	987	40.87%	42	1.74%	399	16.52%	2,415	21.06%
Oakdale	Stanislaus	2,930	40.49%	4,167	57.59%	139	1.92%	-1,237	-17.10%	7,236	14.03%
Patterson	Stanislaus	3,176	65.44%	1,611	33.20%	66	1.36%	1,565	32.25%	4,853	25.18%
Riverbank	Stanislaus	3,370	53.38%	2,837	44.94%	106	1.68%	533	8.44%	6,313	25.21%
Turlock	Stanislaus	10,866	48.73%	11,002	49.34%	432	1.94%	-136	-0.61%	22,300	22.35%
Waterford	Stanislaus	1,008	41.98%	1,343	55.94%	50	2.08%	-335	-13.95%	2,401	20.85%
Unincorporated Area	Stanislaus	13,913	42.07%	18,482	55.89%	674	2.04%	-4,569	-13.82%	33,069	15.69%
Live Oak	Sutter	1,105	52.47%	964	45.77%	37	1.76%	141	6.70%	2,106	9.98%
Yuba City	Sutter	9,326	44.12%	11,434	54.09%	378	1.79%	-2,108	-9.97%	21,138	20.63%
Unincorporated Area	Sutter	2,981	30.83%	6,513	67.36%	175	1.81%	-3,532	-36.53%	9,669	13.49%
Corning	Tehama	823	44.66%	977	53.01%	43	2.33%	-154	-8.36%	1,843	16.35%
Red Bluff	Tehama	1,994	44.96%	2,333	52.60%	108	2.44%	-339	-7.64%	4,435	13.93%
Tehama	Tehama	69	35.38%	120	61.54%	6	3.08%	-51	-26.15%	195	6.84%
Unincorporated Area	Tehama	6,059	33.78%	11,413	63.63%	465	2.59%	-5,354	-29.85%	17,937	9.08%
Unincorporated Area	Trinity	3,233	50.88%	2,940	46.27%	181	2.85%	293	4.61%	6,354	16.62%
Dinuba	Tulare	2,024	53.67%	1,693	44.90%	54	1.43%	331	8.78%	3,771	20.37%
Exeter	Tulare	1,037	33.94%	1,965	64.32%	53	1.73%	-928	-30.38%	3,055	12.12%
Farmersville	Tulare	890	61.98%	518	36.07%	28	1.95%	372	25.91%	1,436	29.75%
Lindsay	Tulare	939	61.65%	562	36.90%	22	1.44%	377	24.75%	1,523	25.39%
Porterville	Tulare	4,963	44.64%	5,968	53.68%	186	1.67%	-1,005	-9.04%	11,117	18.35%
Tulare	Tulare	5,836	43.21%	7,467	55.29%	202	1.50%	-1,631	-12.08%	13,505	19.17%
Visalia	Tulare	15,383	39.84%	22,642	58.65%	583	1.51%	-7,259	-18.80%	38,608	17.62%
Woodlake	Tulare	757	68.32%	334	30.14%	17	1.53%	423	38.18%	1,108	27.62%
Unincorporated Area	Tulare	11,805	38.17%	18,616	60.20%	504	1.63%	-6,811	-22.02%	30,925	15.95%
Sonora	Tuolumne	1,454	49.09%	1,431	48.31%	77	2.60%	23	0.78%	2,962	2.44%
Unincorporated Area	Tuolumne	10,078	41.66%	13,557	56.05%	554	2.29%	-3,479	-14.38%	24,189	8.80%
Camarillo	Ventura	16,098	48.56%	16,504	49.78%	551	1.66%	-406	-1.22%	33,153	15.06%
Fillmore	Ventura	2,824	59.86%	1,814	38.45%	80	1.70%	1,010	21.41%	4,718	20.29%
Moorpark	Ventura	8,080	50.72%	7,586	47.61%	266	1.67%	494	3.10%	15,932	18.86%
Ojai	Ventura	2,737	66.38%	1,308	31.72%	78	1.89%	1,429	34.66%	4,123	11.86%
Oxnard	Ventura	33,991	69.67%	14,107	28.91%	693	1.42%	19,884	40.75%	48,791	18.02%
Port Hueneme	Ventura	4,086	63.23%	2,237	34.62%	139	2.15%	1,849	28.61%	6,462	18.28%
San Buenaventura	Ventura	31,118	59.95%	19,774	38.10%	1,014	1.95%	11,344	21.85%	51,906	15.20%
Santa Paula	Ventura	5,480	64.55%	2,852	33.60%	157	1.85%	2,628	30.96%	8,489	14.16%
Simi Valley	Ventura	26,332	46.64%	29,102	51.55%	1,020	1.81%	-2,770	-4.91%	56,454	17.73%
Thousand Oaks	Ventura	32,886	50.58%	31,112	47.85%	1,022	1.57%	1,774	2.73%	65,020	14.38%
Unincorporated Area	Ventura	23,969	54.14%	19,457	43.95%	847	1.91%	4,512	10.19%	44,273	14.30%
Davis	Yolo	26,104	80.30%	5,725	17.61%	679	2.09%	20,379	62.69%	32,508	12.62%
West Sacramento	Yolo	9,793	61.57%	5,792	36.42%	320	2.01%	4,001	25.16%	15,905	16.86%
Winters	Yolo	1,507	60.35%	945	37.85%	45	1.80%	562	22.51%	2,497	19.03%
Woodland	Yolo	10,957	56.83%	8,005	41.52%	320	1.66%	2,952	15.31%	19,282	21.09%
Unincorporated Area	Yolo	5,127	54.43%	4,125	43.79%	168	1.78%	1,002	10.64%	9,420	17.65%
Marysville	Yuba	1,614	44.54%	1,927	53.17%	83	2.29%	-313	-8.64%	3,624	19.27%
Wheatland	Yuba	488	37.60%	770	59.32%	40	3.08%	-282	-21.73%	1,298	18.23%
Unincorporated Area	Yuba	6,764	41.14%	9,310	56.62%	369	2.24%	-2,546	-15.48%	16,443	21.65%
Totals		8,274,473	61.10% (Note: Statewide candidate vote percentages and the total vote number differ here because California's Supplement to Statement of Vote does not count write in votes as part of the city totals.)	5,011,781	37.01%	255,410	1.89%	3,262,692	24.09%	13,541,664	14.13%

==== Cities & Unincorporated Areas that flipped from Republican to Democratic ====
- Amador City (Amador)
- Sutter Creek (Amador)
- Williams (Colusa)
- Brentwood (Contra Costa)
- Clayton (Contra Costa)
- Danville (Contra Costa)
- Crescent City (Del Norte)
- Placerville (El Dorado)
- Fowler (Fresno)
- Fresno (Fresno)
- Kerman (Fresno)
- Selma (Fresno)
- Ferndale (Humboldt)
- Imperial (Imperial)
- Bishop (Inyo)
- Shafter (Kern)
- Wasco (Kern)
- Corcoran (Kings)
- Arcadia (Los Angeles)
- Avalon (Los Angeles)
- Covina (Los Angeles)
- Diamond Bar (Los Angeles)
- El Segundo (Los Angeles)
- Hidden Hills (Los Angeles)
- La Canada Flintridge (Los Angeles)
- Lakewood (Los Angeles)
- Lancaster (Los Angeles)
- Palmdale (Los Angeles)
- Torrance (Los Angeles)
- Westlake Village (Los Angeles)
- Whittier (Los Angeles)
- Madera (Madera)
- Atwater (Merced)
- Dos Palos (Merced)
- Gustine (Merced)
- Merced (Merced)
- Grass Valley (Nevada)
- Aliso Viejo (Orange)
- Anaheim (Orange)
- Buena Park (Orange)
- Costa Mesa (Orange)
- Irvine (Orange)
- La Habra (Orange)
- Stanton (Orange)
- Tustin (Orange)
- Auburn (Placer)
- Colfax (Placer)
- Lake Elsinore (Riverside)
- Riverside (Riverside)
- San Jacinto (Riverside)
- Elk Grove (Sacramento)
- Rancho Cordova (Sacramento)
- Unincorporated Area of Sacramento
- Unincorporated Area of San Benito
- Adelanto (San Bernardino)
- Barstow (San Bernardino)
- Chino (San Bernardino)
- Highland (San Bernardino)
- Loma Linda (San Bernardino)
- Rancho Cucamonga (San Bernardino)
- Victorville (San Bernardino)
- Carlsbad (San Diego)
- Chula Vista (San Diego)
- Imperial Beach (San Diego)
- La Mesa (San Diego)
- Oceanside (San Diego)
- Manteca (San Joaquin)
- Grover Beach (San Luis Obispo)
- Pismo Beach (San Luis Obispo)
- Atherton (San Mateo)
- Hillsborough (San Mateo)
- Buellton (Santa Barbara)
- Lompoc (Santa Barbara)
- Santa Maria (Santa Barbara)
- Unincorporated Area of Santa Barbara
- Dixon (Solano)
- Rio Vista (Solano)
- Vacaville (Solano)
- Ceres (Stanislaus)
- Modesto (Stanislaus)
- Newman (Stanislaus)
- Riverbank (Stanislaus)
- Live Oak (Sutter)
- Unincorporated Area of Trinity
- Dinuba (Tulare)
- Farmersville (Tulare)
- Lindsay (Tulare)
- Sonora (Tuolumne)
- Moorpark (Ventura)
- Thousand Oaks (Ventura)
- Unincorporated Area of Ventura
- Woodland (Yolo)
- Unincorporated Area of Yolo

==== Cities & Unincorporated Areas that flipped from Tied to Democratic ====
- Holtville (Imperial)

==== Cities & Unincorporated Areas that flipped from Tied to Republican ====
- Vernon (Los Angeles)

== Electors ==
Technically, the voters of California cast their ballots for electors: representatives to the Electoral College. California is allocated 55 electors because it has 53 congressional districts and 2 senators. All candidates who appear on the ballot or qualify to receive write-in votes must submit a list of 55 electors, who pledge to vote for their candidate and his or her running mate, to the California Secretary of State. Whoever wins the majority of votes in the state is awarded all 55 electoral votes. Their chosen electors then vote for president and vice president. Although electors are pledged to their candidate and running mate, they are not obligated to vote for them. An elector who votes for someone other than his or her candidate is known as a faithless elector.

The electors of each state and the District of Columbia met on December 15, 2008, to cast their votes for president and vice president. The Electoral College itself never meets as one body. Instead, the electors from each state and the District of Columbia met in their respective capitols. In California, the 55 electors meet in the State Capitol building in Sacramento to cast their ballots.

The following were the members of the Electoral College from California. All were pledged to and voted for Barack Obama and Joe Biden.

- Jaime Alvarado
- William Ayer
- Joe Baca Jr.
- Ian Blue
- Roberta Brooks
- Nathan Brostrom
- Mark Cibula
- Robert Conaway
- Ray Cordova
- Lawrence Du Bois
- James Farley
- John Freidenrich
- Mark Friedman
- Bobby Glaser
- Audrey Gordon
- Robert Handy
- Ilene Haber
- Mary Hubert
- Aleita Huguenin
- Richard Hundrieser
- Fred Jackson
- Patrick Kahler
- Mary Keadle
- LeRoy King
- Vinz Koller
- Mark Macarro
- Alma Marquez
- Ana Mascarenas
- Betty McMillion
- Michael McNerney
- Gwen Moore
- Jeremy Nishihara
- Gregory Olzack
- Joe Perez
- Nancy Parrish
- Lou Paulson
- Anthony Rendon
- Frank Salazar
- David Sanchez
- Larry Sheingold
- Lane Sherman
- Stephen Smith
- Juadina Stallings
- Kenneth Sulzer
- Aaruni Thakur
- Norma Torres
- Silissa Uriarte-Smith
- Sid Voorakkara
- Greg Warner
- Karen Waters
- Sanford Weiner
- Gregory Willenborg
- Kelley Willis
- James Yedor
- Christine Young

== See also ==
- February 2008 California elections
- November 2008 California elections
- Statewide opinion polling for the 2008 United States presidential election: California
- 2008 Democratic Party presidential primaries
- 2008 Republican Party presidential primaries
