= Fairmead, California =

Fairmead
- Census-designated place
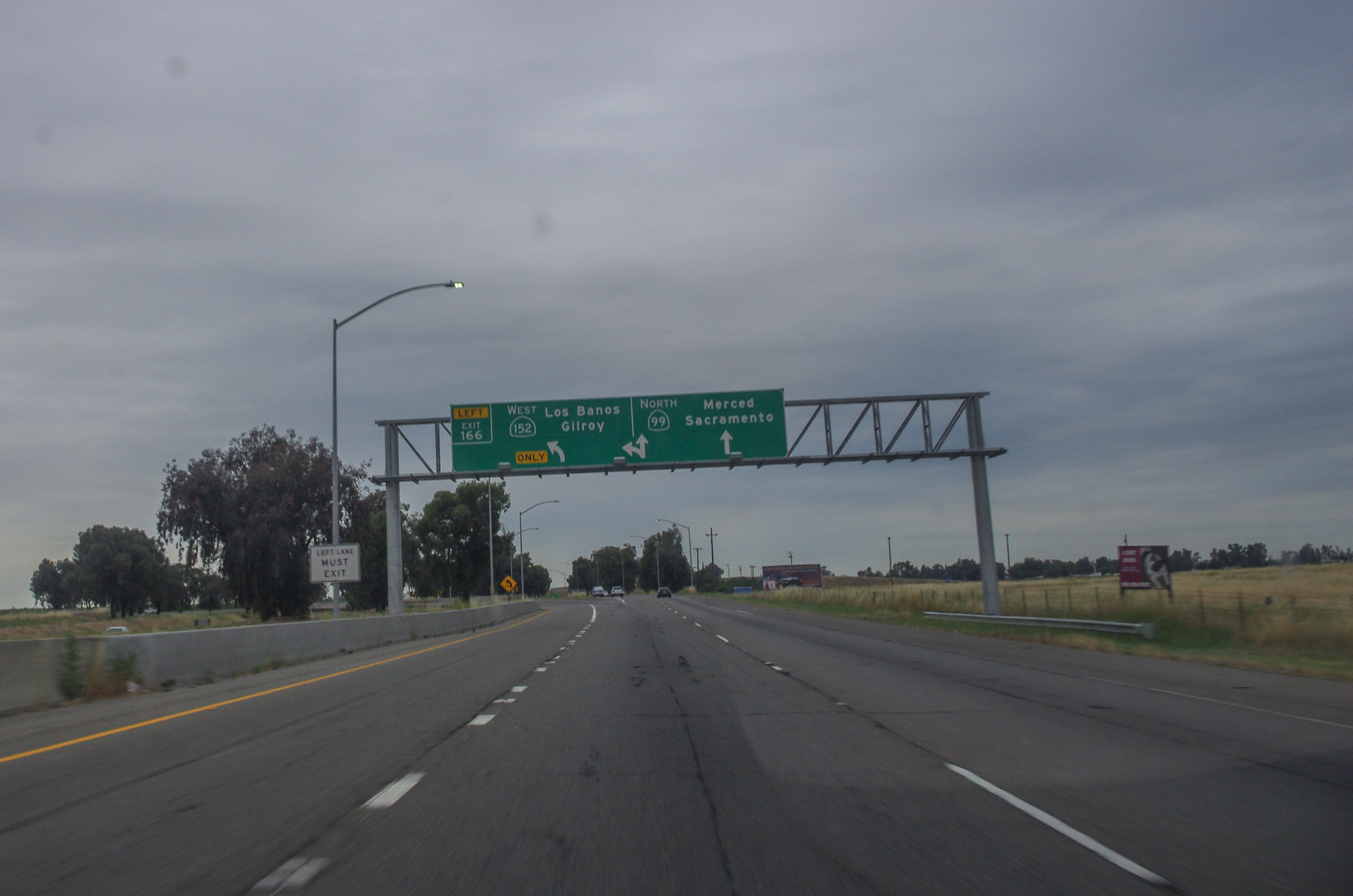
- California State Route 99 passing through Fairmead

- Location in Madera County, California

- Location within California
- Coordinates: 37°04′35″N 120°11′35″W
- Country: United States
- State: California
- County: Madera

Area
  - Total: 7.729 sq mi (20.018 km^{2})
  - Land: 7.729 sq mi (20.018 km^{2})
  - Water: 0 sq mi (0 km^{2}) 0%
- Elevation: 253 ft (77 m)

Population (2020)
  - Total: 1,235
  - Density: 159.8/sq mi (61.69/km^{2})
- Time zone: UTC-8 (Pacific (PST))
  - Summer (DST): UTC-7 (PDT)
- ZIP Code: 93610 (Chowchilla)
- GNIS feature IDs: 223335; 2583011
- FIPS code: 06-23210

Fairmead is a census-designated place in Madera County, California, United States. It is located 11 miles (18 km) northwest of Madera, at an elevation of 253 feet (77 m), and bordered to the northwest by Chowchilla. The population was 1,235 at the 2020 census.

A post office operated at Fairmead from 1913 to 1940. The community is impacted by the California High-Speed Rail, as the planned route will dislocate residents.

== Demographics ==
Historical population
Census	Pop.	Note	%±
2010	1,447		—
2020	1,235		−14.7%
U.S. Decennial Census; 1850–1870 1880-1890; 1900 1910 1920; 1930 1940 1950; 1960 1970 1980; 1990 2000 2010

Fairmead first appeared as a census-designated place in the 2010 U.S. census.

=== 2020 census ===
As of the 2020 census, Fairmead had a population of 1,235 and a population density of 159.8 inhabitants per square mile (61.7/km^{2}). The median age was 33.8 years. The age distribution was 354 people (28.7%) under the age of 18, 123 people (10.0%) aged 18 to 24, 315 people (25.5%) aged 25 to 44, 298 people (24.1%) aged 45 to 64, and 145 people (11.7%) who were 65 years of age or older. For every 100 females, there were 97.3 males, and for every 100 females age 18 and over, there were 94.9 males age 18 and over. 0.0% of residents lived in urban areas, while 100.0% lived in rural areas.

The whole population lived in households. There were 346 households, out of which 153 (44.2%) had children under the age of 18 living in them. Of all households, 186 (53.8%) were married-couple households, 18 (5.2%) were cohabiting couple households, 69 (19.9%) were households with a male householder and no spouse or partner present, and 73 (21.1%) were households with a female householder and no spouse or partner present. About 54 households (15.6%) were made up of individuals and 29 (8.4%) had someone living alone who was 65 years of age or older. The average household size was 3.57. There were 271 families (78.3% of all households).

There were 374 housing units at an average density of 48.4 units per square mile (18.7 units/km^{2}), of which 346 (92.5%) were occupied and 28 (7.5%) were vacant. Of the occupied units, 202 (58.4%) were owner-occupied and 144 (41.6%) were occupied by renters. The homeowner vacancy rate was 0.5% and the rental vacancy rate was 2.7%.

Racial composition as of the 2020 census
Race	Number	Percent
White	373	30.2%
Black or African American	72	5.8%
American Indian and Alaska Native	35	2.8%
Asian	7	0.6%
Native Hawaiian and Other Pacific Islander	2	0.2%
Some other race	488	39.5%
Two or more races	258	20.9%
Hispanic or Latino (of any race)	875	70.9%

== Education ==
Chowchilla School District and Chowchilla Union High School District serve residents of the community.

== Notable people ==
- Bob Helm, jazz clarinetist
