= Presidential Election Reform Act =

Proposed ballot measure in California

The Presidential Election Reform Act was a proposed initiative in the state of California to alter the way the state's electoral votes for president are distributed among presidential candidates.

== Background ==
The initiative, No. 07-0032, was proposed by a group called Californians for Equal Representation, originally for placement on California's June 3, 2008, primary election ballot. The group's address was apparently the offices of Bell, McAndrews & Hiltachk, a law firm that also has represented the California Republican Party in some matters, and whose senior partner, Charles H. Bell Jr., serves as General Counsel to the California Republican Party. The initiative's sponsors sought to change the way California's presidential electoral votes are distributed.

Currently, as in most states, California's votes in the electoral college are distributed in a winner-take-all manner; whichever presidential candidate wins the state's popular vote wins all 55 of the state's electoral votes. Under Initiative No. 07-0032, the state's electoral votes would instead have been awarded by Congressional district; the candidate who won a Congressional district's popular vote for president would have won an electoral vote representing that district, and the winner of the most electoral votes statewide would have won an additional two votes.

The proposed referendum's scheme is known as the District Method (a.k.a. the Maine-Nebraska Method), which describes the process by which voters in each of the state's congressional districts select a single elector, with the two remaining electors being selected by the aggregate popular vote of the entire state. Under the District Method, a State's electoral votes can be split among two or more candidates, just as a state's congressional delegation can be split among multiple political parties.

As of 2025, Nebraska and Maine are the only states using the District Method of distributing electoral votes. Maine started using the method with the 1972 presidential elections and Nebraska started using the method during the election of 1992. The 2008 presidential elections was the first time Nebraska did not award all its electoral votes to a single candidate since switching to the District Method, as Barack Obama won the popular vote within the 2nd congressional district. Donald Trump carried the second Congressional District of Maine in the 2016 election, first time Maine has split its electoral votes. In 2020, both states split their electoral votes, with Donald Trump again winning the second Congressional District of Maine and Joe Biden winning the second Congressional District of Nebraska.

== Controversy ==
=== Alleged partisan motivation ===
Several commentators criticized the proposed initiative, claiming that it was simply an attempt by some Republicans to award the Republican presidential nominee more votes than that nominee would receive under a winner-take-all system. The Democratic presidential candidate has won California's popular vote in every presidential election since 1992. Had the Presidential Election Reform Act been in effect during the 2004 presidential election, George W. Bush would have won 22 of the state's electoral votes instead of 0, and John Kerry would have won only 33 of the state's votes instead of all 55 votes and would have lost the electoral college vote even if he had carried Ohio.

=== Possible unconstitutionality ===
Some commentators also argued that the initiative violated Article II, Section 1, Clause 2 of the U.S. Constitution. Under Article II, a state's electoral votes must be appointed "in such Manner as the Legislature thereof may direct." Because the Presidential Election Reform Act would have appointed the state's electoral votes in a manner directed by popular initiative instead of in a manner directed by the California legislature, the act would arguably have violated Article II, Section 1, Clause 2. This legal issue is addressed in Section 8.3 of the book Every Vote Equal, which notes that "Legislature" is used with two distinct meanings in the U.S. Constitution: either to each state's actual Legislature, or to the state's lawmaking process.

== Outcome ==
Efforts to get the initiative on the ballot in time for the 2008 election failed. The initiative first appeared to be dead in September 2007. It gained new life in late October 2007, when a new organization began raising the money thought needed to get the initiative on the ballot. But on December 6, 2007, the initiative's backers said that the measure would not appear on the June 2008 ballot due to lack of funds and insufficient time.

The group then attempted to get the initiative onto the November 2008 ballot, which meant that even if the initiative had passed, there would have probably been a court challenge to determine if the act could have gone into effect for the 2008 presidential election held on the same day. The deadline to file signatures was February 4, 2008, but no signatures were filed by that date; therefore, the initiative did not appear on the ballot in 2008.

Republican political strategist David Gilliard, who helped organize the campaign, said there were no plans to submit another measure in the future, although he did not rule out the possibility.

== See also ==
- National Popular Vote Interstate Compact
- Electoral reform in California
- United States presidential election in California, 2008
