= Chowchilla School District =

School district in California, United States

Address
- 355 North Fifth Street Chowchilla, California, 93610; United States

District information
- Type: Public
- Grades: K–8
- NCES District ID: 0608520

Students and staff
- Students: 2,193 (2020–2021)
- Teachers: 93.0 (FTE)
- Staff: 144.77 (FTE)
- Student–teacher ratio: 23.58:1

Other information
- Website: chowkids.com

Chowchilla Elementary School District is a public school district based in Madera County, California.

It feeds into Chowchilla Union High School District, which operates Chowchilla Union High School.

It includes Chowchilla and Fairmead.

== Schools ==
- Grades 7–8: Wilson Middle School
- Grades 5–6: Fairmead School
- Grades 3–4: Ronald Reagan Schiool
- until grade 2:
  - Stephens School (starts at "TK")
  - Merle L. Fuller School (starts at preschool)
