= Dairyland, Madera County, California =

Unincorporated community in California, United States

Dairyland
- Unincorporated community
- Location in California Dairyland (the United States)
- Coordinates: 37°01′06″N 120°18′38″W
- Country: United States
- State: California
- County: Madera
- Elevation: 184 ft (56 m)

Dairyland is an unincorporated community in Madera County, California, United States. It is located 7.5 miles (12 km) south-southwest of Chowchilla, at an elevation of 184 feet (56 m). Dairyland was, at one time, the terminus of the Chowchilla Pacific Railroad, and at a terminus of a branch of the Southern Pacific Railroad.

== Education ==
The Alview-Dairyland Union School District is the local elementary school district.
