= Chowchilla, California =

City in California, United States

- City
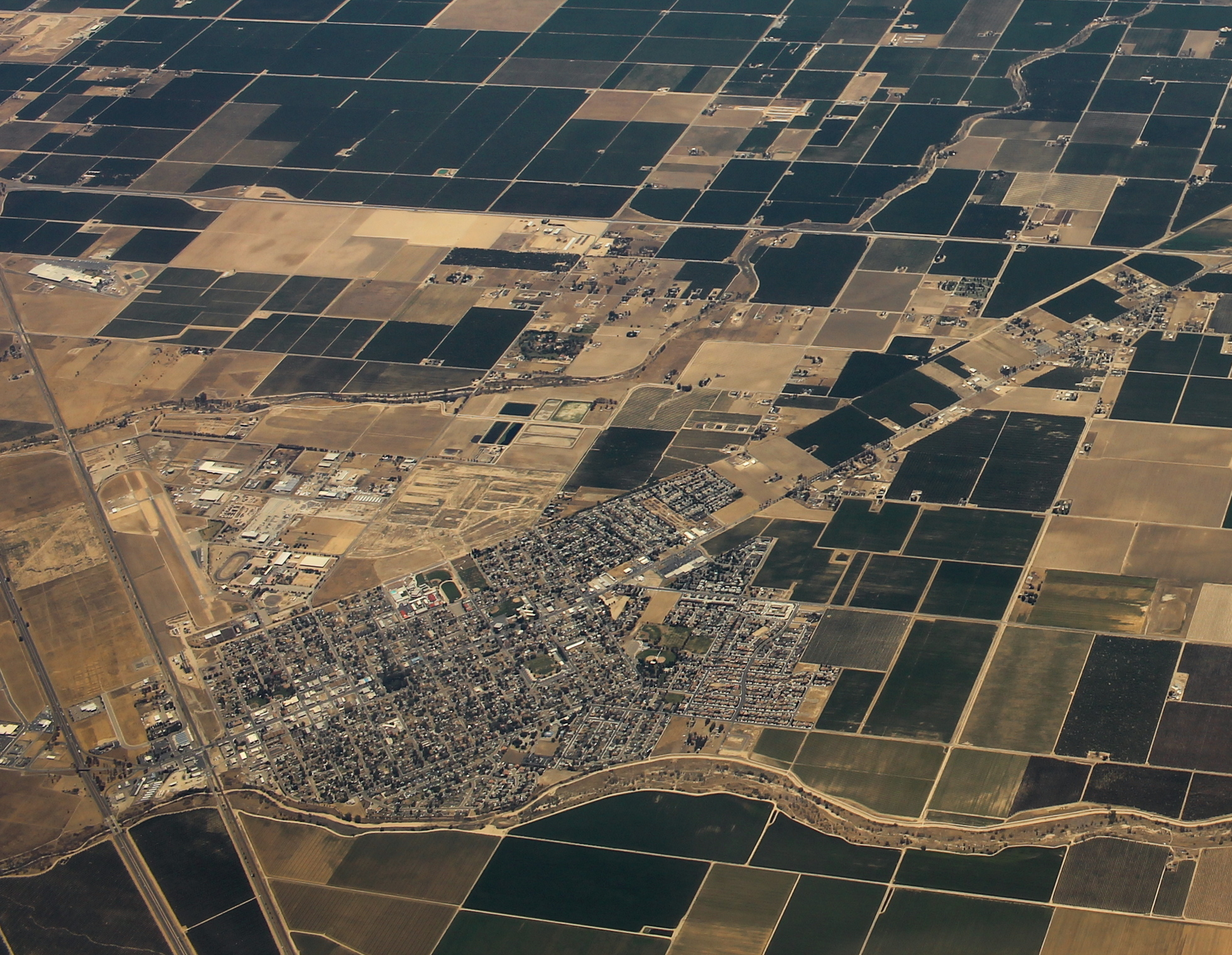
- Aerial view of Chowchilla

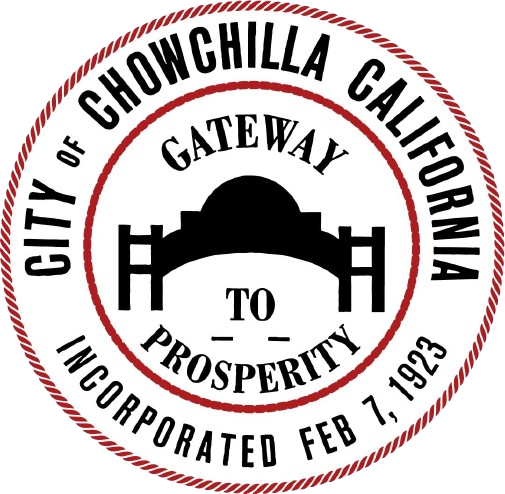
- Seal
- Interactive map of Chowchilla, California
- Location in the United States
- Coordinates: 37°7′N 120°16′W
- Country: United States of America
- State: California
- County: Madera
- Incorporated: February 7, 1923

Area
  - Total: 11.13 sq mi (28.83 km^{2})
  - Land: 11.08 sq mi (28.71 km^{2})
  - Water: 0.046 sq mi (0.12 km^{2}) 0%
- Elevation: 240 ft (73 m)

Population (2020)
  - Total: 19,039
  - Density: 1,717.3/sq mi (663.07/km^{2})
- Time zone: UTC−08:00 (PST)
  - Summer (DST): UTC−07:00 (PDT)
- ZIP Code: 93610
- Area code: 559
- FIPS code: 06-13294
- GNIS feature IDs: 277601, 2409459
- Website: www.cityofchowchilla.org

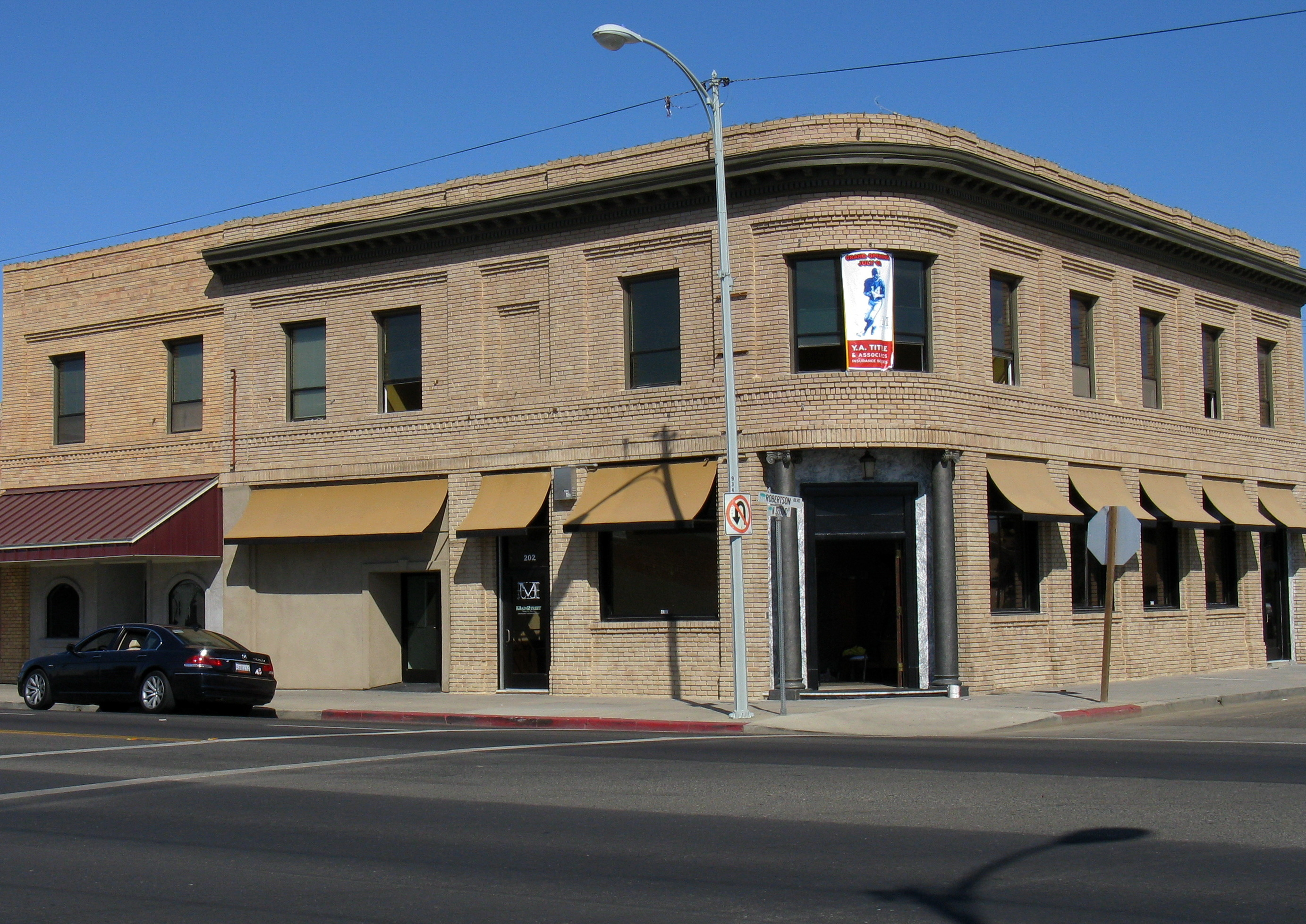
Bank of Chowchilla Building

Chowchilla is a city in Madera County, California, United States. The city's population was 19,039 at the 2020 census. Chowchilla is located 16 miles (26 km) northwest of Madera, at an elevation of 240 feet (73 m).

The city is the location of two prisons: Central California Women's Facility and Valley State Prison.

== History ==
The word "Chowchilla" is an anglicized spelling of chaushila, the name of an indigenous Yokuts people who, historically, inhabited the areas in and around Madera County.

The first post office at Chowchilla opened in 1912 and the city incorporated eleven years later, in 1923.

=== 1976 bus kidnapping ===
Chowchilla made national news on July 15, 1976, when 26 children and their school bus driver were kidnapped and held in a buried moving van at a quarry in Livermore, California. The driver and some of the children were able to escape and notify the quarry guard. All the victims returned unharmed. The quarry owner's son and two friends were convicted and sentenced to life in prison.

== Geography ==
Chowchilla is located in California's Central Valley. Via California Route 99, it is 16 miles (26 km) northwest of Madera, the county seat, and 18 miles (29 km) southeast of Merced. It is 39 miles (63 km) northwest of Fresno and 256 miles (412 km) north of Downtown Los Angeles.

According to the United States Census Bureau, the city has a total area of 11.1 square miles (29 km^{2}), of which 0.05 square miles (0.13 km^{2}), or 0.41%, are water. Ash Slough, a tributary of the Fresno River, runs along the northern edge of the city.

=== Climate ===
The climate of Chowchilla is Mediterranean. It receives an average of about 12 inches of precipitation per year. The wettest months are December, January, and February, with January being the wettest. Chowchilla has dry, hot summers, and mild to cool, rainy winters. Chowchilla experiences frequent fog from November to March and overcast days are common, especially in January. In 2005, Chowchilla had 20 consecutive cloudy, rainy days. There are days with moderate to heavy rain during the winter months. In January, the high temperature may drop as low as 45 °F (7 °C). During the summer, when there is usually no rain, the temperature may reach as high or higher than 110 °F (43 °C). Snow in Chowchilla is rare.

Climate data for Chowchilla 2 W, California (1981–2010) extremes 1932–present
Month	Jan	Feb	Mar	Apr	May	Jun	Jul	Aug	Sep	Oct	Nov	Dec	Year
Record high °F (°C)	79 (26)	79 (26)	90 (32)	98 (37)	107 (42)	115 (46)	116 (47)	112 (44)	115 (46)	101 (38)	92 (33)	75 (24)	116 (47)
Mean daily maximum °F (°C)	60.7 (15.9)	64.8 (18.2)	69.8 (21.0)	74.0 (23.3)	82.5 (28.1)	90.7 (32.6)	95.7 (35.4)	94.8 (34.9)	90.4 (32.4)	81.9 (27.7)	69.4 (20.8)	70.5 (21.4)	81.4 (27.4)
Mean daily minimum °F (°C)	41.4 (5.2)	43.6 (6.4)	46.2 (7.9)	48.9 (9.4)	54.2 (12.3)	60.1 (15.6)	64.8 (18.2)	63.6 (17.6)	60.4 (15.8)	53.0 (11.7)	45.9 (7.7)	40.8 (4.9)	48.4 (9.1)
Record low °F (°C)	15 (−9)	21 (−6)	24 (−4)	29 (−2)	33 (1)	38 (3)	42 (6)	39 (4)	34 (1)	24 (−4)	23 (−5)	18 (−8)	15 (−9)
Average precipitation inches (mm)	3.66 (93)	3.34 (85)	2.81 (71)	1.42 (36)	0.85 (22)	0.24 (6.1)	0.12 (3.0)	0.00 (0.00)	0.24 (6.1)	0.98 (25)	1.77 (45)	3.33 (85)	19.0 (480)

== Demographics ==
Historical population
Census	Pop.	Note	%±
1930	847		—
1940	1,957		131.1%
1950	3,893		98.9%
1960	4,525		16.2%
1970	4,349		−3.9%
1980	5,122		17.8%
1990	5,930		15.8%
2000	11,127		87.6%
2010	18,720		68.2%
2020	19,039		1.7%
2024 (est.)	19,191	▲	0.8%
U.S. Decennial Census; 1930 1940 1950; 1960 1970 1980; 1990 2000 2010

Official population figures include inmates of two prisons.

Chowchilla is part of the Madera metropolitan statistical area.

=== 2020 census ===
As of the 2020 census, Chowchilla had a population of 19,039 and a population density of 1,717.4 inhabitants per square mile (663.1/km^{2}). The census reported that 69.7% of the population lived in households and 30.3% were institutionalized. Among all residents, 69.3% lived in urban areas and 30.7% lived in rural areas.

There were 4,252 households, of which 46.2% had children under the age of 18 living in them. Of all households, 48.6% were married-couple households, 7.9% were cohabiting couple households, 27.7% had a female householder with no partner present, and 15.7% had a male householder with no partner present. About 18.1% of households were one person households, and 8.4% were one-person households with someone aged 65 or older. The average household size was 3.12, and there were 3,241 families (76.2% of all households).

The age distribution was 21.2% under the age of 18, 9.2% aged 18 to 24, 32.6% aged 25 to 44, 26.6% aged 45 to 64, and 10.4% aged 65 or older. The median age was 36.7 years. For every 100 females, there were 100.3 males, and for every 100 females age 18 and over, there were 99.0 males age 18 and over.

There were 4,432 housing units at an average density of 384.0 units per square mile (148.3 units/km^{2}), of which 4,252 (95.9%) were occupied. Of occupied housing units, 53.3% were owner-occupied and 46.7% were occupied by renters. The housing vacancy rate was 4.1%; the homeowner vacancy rate was 1.4%, and the rental vacancy rate was 2.6%.

Racial composition as of the 2020 census
Race	Number	Percent
White	8,336	43.8%
Black or African American	1,860	9.8%
American Indian and Alaska Native	302	1.6%
Asian	524	2.8%
Native Hawaiian and Other Pacific Islander	40	0.2%
Some other race	5,668	29.8%
Two or more races	2,309	12.1%
Hispanic or Latino (of any race)	9,054	47.6%

=== 2023 ACS 5-year estimates ===
In 2023, the US Census Bureau estimated that the median household income was $63,308, and the per capita income was $21,944. About 17.6% of families and 22.2% of the population were below the poverty line.

=== 2010 census ===
At the 2010 census Chowchilla had a population of 18,720, including the prisons' inmates. The population density was 2,443.5 inhabitants per square mile (943.4/km^{2}). The racial makeup of Chowchilla was 11,533 (61.6%) White, 2,358 (12.6%) African American, 376 (2.0%) Native American, 395 (2.1%) Asian, 37 (0.2%) Pacific Islander, 3,313 (17.7%) from other races, and 708 (3.8%) from two or more races. Hispanic or Latino of any race were 7,073 persons (37.8%).

The census reported that 11,311 people (60.4% of the population) lived in households, 6 (0%) lived in non-institutionalized group quarters, and 7,403 (39.5%) were institutionalized.

There were 3,673 households, 1,693 (46.1%) had children under the age of 18 living in them, 1,932 (52.6%) were opposite-sex married couples living together, 586 (16.0%) had a female householder with no husband present, 260 (7.1%) had a male householder with no wife present. There were 275 (7.5%) unmarried opposite-sex partnerships, and 24 (0.7%) same-sex married couples or partnerships. 721 households (19.6%) were one person and 293 (8.0%) had someone living alone who was 65 or older. The average household size was 3.08. There were 2,778 families (75.6% of households); the average family size was 3.52.

The age distribution was 3,583 people (19.1%) under the age of 18, 2,048 people (10.9%) aged 18 to 24, 7,343 people (39.2%) aged 25 to 44, 4,429 people (23.7%) aged 45 to 64, and 1,317 people (7.0%) who were 65 or older. The median age was 34.7 years. For every 100 females, there were 42.7 males. For every 100 females age 18 and over, there were 33.3 males.

There were 4,154 housing units at an average density of 542.2 per square mile, of the occupied units 1,966 (53.5%) were owner-occupied and 1,707 (46.5%) were rented. The homeowner vacancy rate was 6.2%; the rental vacancy rate was 7.9%. 5,920 people (31.6% of the population) lived in owner-occupied housing units and 5,391 people (28.8%) lived in rental housing units.

== Economy ==
The city is the location of two California Department of Corrections and Rehabilitation facilities, the Central California Women's Facility and Valley State Prison. Central California Women's houses the state's female death row.

== Government ==
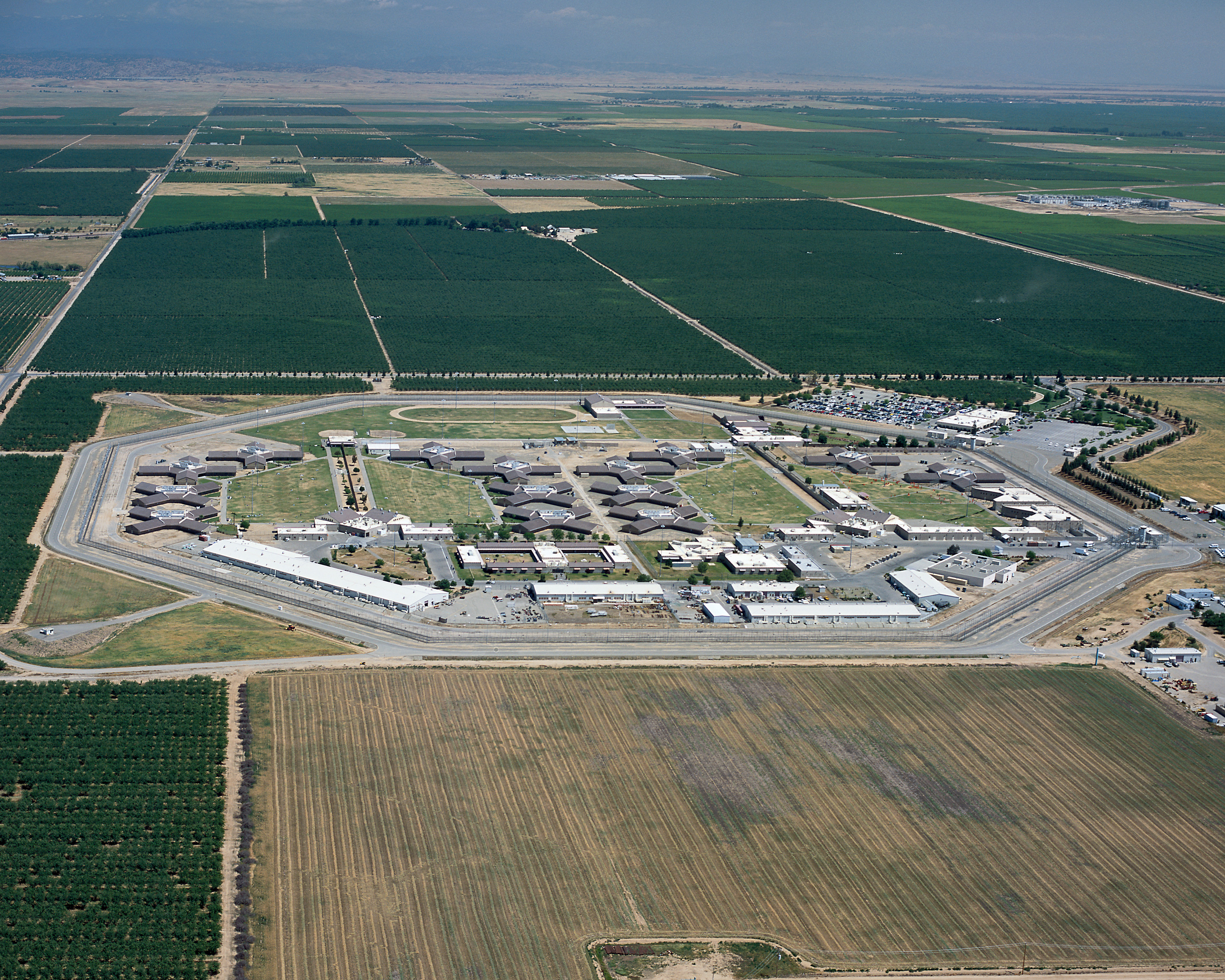
Central California Women's Facility

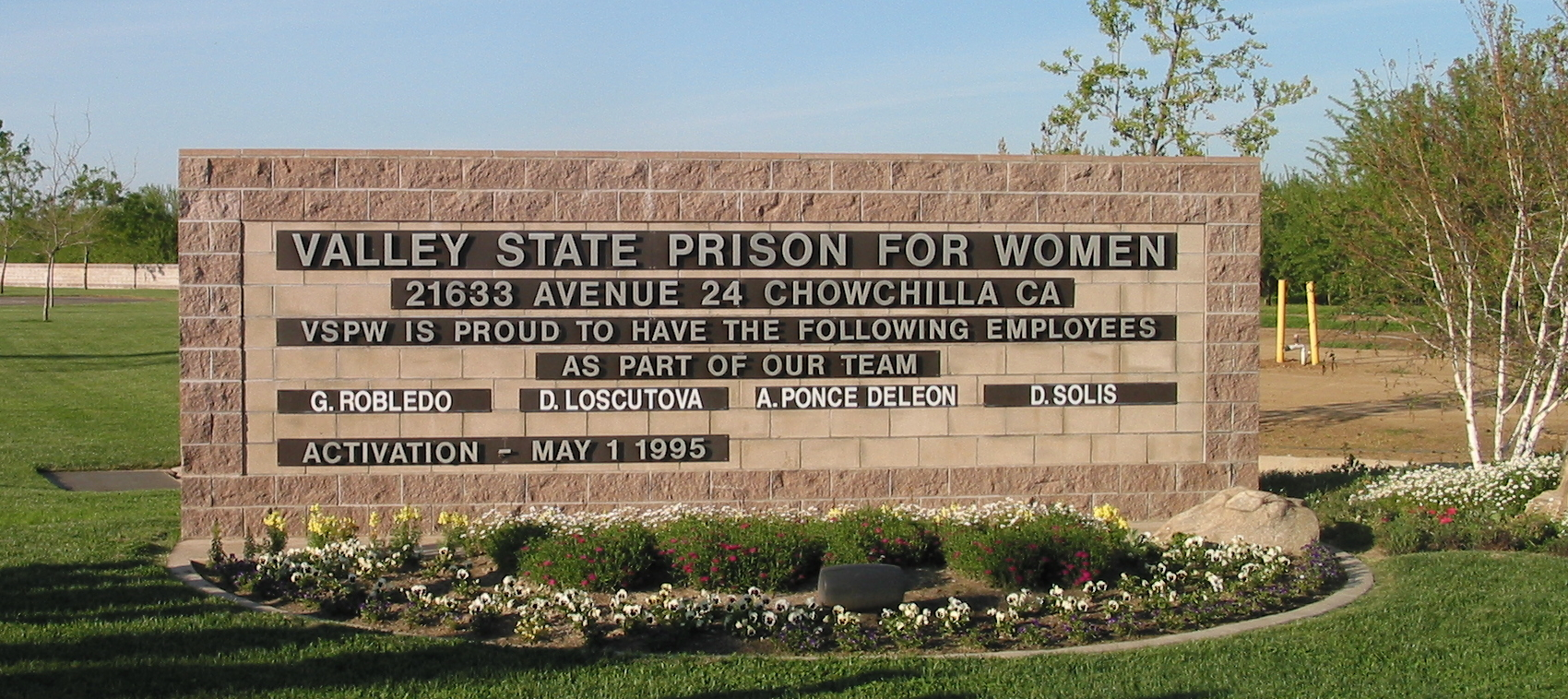
Valley State Prison

In the California State Legislature, Chowchilla is in the 14th senatorial district, represented by Democrat Anna Caballero, and in the 27th Assembly district, represented by Democrat Esmeralda Soria.

In the United States House of Representatives, Chowchilla is in California's 13th congressional district, represented by Democrat Adam Gray.

== Education ==
Three public school districts serve the residents of Chowchilla and the surrounding area, as well as one private school. Chowchilla Elementary School District (Grades K to 8th) and Chowchilla Union High School District (9th to 12th grade) make up the local public school system of the city proper. Alview-Dairyland Union School District (Grades K to 8th) serves nearby rural communities including Dairyland.

Chowchilla Elementary School District is made up of five school campuses and typically enrolls city residents, as well as residents from the nearby community of Fairmead. The Alview-Dairyland Union School District is composed of two rural area school campuses, and serves residents that reside outside of town. Upon completing 8th grade, students from both elementary districts are enrolled in the town's comprehensive high school, Chowchilla Union High School. The Chowchilla Union High School District also operates Gateway Continuation school and an Independent Study program.

The Chowchilla Elementary School District operates five schools, with student population distributed by grade level. Stephens School [Grades: TK, K, 1 and 2], Fuller School [Grades: TK, K, 1 and 2], Ronald Reagan School [Grades 3 and 4], and Fairmead School [Grades 5 and 6] are elementary schools, and Wilson School [Grades 7 and 8] is the middle school.

Alview-Dairyland Union School District operates Alview Elementary School [Grades K through 3] and Dairyland Elementary School [Grades 4 through 8].

There is also a private school, Chowchilla Seventh Day Adventist, serving K-8, located 4 miles (6 km) south of town.

== Infrastructure ==
=== Transportation ===
==== Airport ====
The Chowchilla Airport, a municipal airport used for general aviation, is located southeast of the main part of the city.

==== Roads ====
Chowchilla is located along the Golden State Highway (California State Route 99 [SR 99]), which runs northwest–southeast, just northeast of the main part of the city. The community is also served by California State Route 233 (Robertson Boulevard), which runs southwest from SR 99 for nearly 4 miles (6.4 km) to end at California State Route 152 (which runs east–west about 2.5 miles [4.0 km] south of Chowchilla).

==== Bus ====
Public transportation within the city of Chowchilla is provided by Chowchilla Area Transit (CATX), which is a dial-a-ride demand-responsive service with no fixed routes. CATX operates on weekdays with the exception of selected holidays. Inter-city connections are provided by the county via Madera County Connection, which operates one fixed route connecting Chowchilla with the county seat in Madera.

==== High-speed rail ====
Chowchilla Wye is planned to be the point where the California High-Speed Rail's main spine splits into two northern branches: one traveling to the San Francisco Bay Area, and the other continuing north to Sacramento.

== Notable people ==
- Henry Farrell, screenwriter and novelist best known for What Ever Happened to Baby Jane? and Hush... Hush, Sweet Charlotte
- Ronald D. Moore, screenwriter and television producer best known for his work on Star Trek and the reimagined Battlestar Galactica television series
- Asterisk Talley, women's golf champion
- Cameron Worrell, former NFL player for the Chicago Bears

== See also ==
- List of municipalities in California
