= Chowchilla Airport =

Airport in California, United States

- IATA: none; ICAO: none; FAA LID: 2O6

Summary
- Airport type: City of Chowchilla
- Operator: Chowchilla, California
- Location: 242
- Elevation AMSL: 73.8 ft (22.5 m)
- Coordinates: 37°06′45″N 120°14′49″W

Map
- Location of airport in California

Runways
Direction	Length		Surface
Direction	ft	m	Surface
12/30	3,250	991	Asphalt

Chowchilla Airport (FAA LID: 2O6) is a public airport located one mile (1.6 km) southeast of Chowchilla, serving Madera County, California, United States. It is mostly used for general aviation.

== Facilities ==
Chowchilla Airport covers 75 acres (300,000 m^{2}) and has one runway:

- Runway 12/30: 3,250 x 60 ft (991 x 18 m), surface: asphalt
