= Chowchilla Union High School District =

School district in California, United States

Address
- 805 Humboldt Avenue Chowchilla, California, 93610; United States

District information
- Type: Public
- Grades: 9–12
- NCES District ID: 0608550

Students and staff
- Students: 1,098
- Teachers: 48.25
- Staff: 69.65
- Student–teacher ratio: 22.76

Other information
- Website: www.chowchillahigh.org

Chowchilla Union High School District (CUHSD) is a school district headquartered in Chowchilla, California. It operates Chowchilla Union High School and the continuation school Gateway. Its feeder elementary districts are Alview-Dairyland Union School District and Chowchilla Elementary School District.

The district board agreed to change the high school mascot to the "tribe" in 2016; it was previously the "redskin" but controversies around Native American sports mascots caused the board to re-examine it. The previous year the State of California passed a law banning public schools using obvious Native American names.
