= Chowchilla Union High School =

Coordinates: 37.1150°N 120.2626°W

Location
- 805 Humboldt Ave; Chowchilla, Madera County, California

Information
- Other name: Chowchilla Union High School District
- NCES District ID: 0608550
- NCES School ID: 00852
- Principal: Ryan Stockton
- Teaching staff: 46.75 (FTE)
- Grades: 9–12
- Enrollment: 1,067 (2023–2024)
- Student to teacher ratio: 22.82
- Colors: White and Red
- Mascot: Tribe
- Website: www.chowchillahigh.org

Chowchilla Union High School is a public high school located in Chowchilla, California. It is within the Chowchilla Union High School District.

== Statistics ==
=== Demographics ===
In the 2016–2017 school year, the high school had a total of 1,051 students enrolled.

| African American | American Indian | Asian | Filipino | Hispanic/Latino | White | Two or More Races |
|---|---|---|---|---|---|---|
| 1.8% | 0.9% | 1.6% | 0.5% | 59.7% | 34.8% | 0.8% |

== Notable alumni ==
- Morris Owens, former NFL wide receiver for the Miami Dolphins and the Tampa Bay Buccaneers
