= The Art of Transformation =

The Art of Transformation may refer to:

- The Art of Transformation (book), a 2006 book by Newt Gingrich
- The Art of Transformation (album), an album by GRITS
