= A Contract with the Earth =

2007 book by Newt Gingrich

- First edition
- Author: Newt Gingrich and Terry L. Maple
- Language: English
- Publisher: 2007 (Johns Hopkins University Press)
- Publication place: USA
- Pages: 256 pages
- ISBN: 978-0-8018-8780-2
- Preceded by: Rediscovering God in America
- Followed by: Real Change: From the World That Fails to the World That Works

A Contract with the Earth is a book by Newt Gingrich and Terry L. Maple, with a foreword by E. O. Wilson. Its title is derived from a 10-point "contract" the authors put forward in the book.

== Synopsis ==
A Contract with the Earth is, broadly, a manifesto that challenges those on the right to provide a strategy for repairing the planet and calls on the government to embrace the concept that a healthy environment is required for a healthy democracy and economy. This approach, alternately branded mainstream and entrepreneurial environmentalism by the authors, requires that companies should lead the way in environmental issues while governments provide them with incentives to reduce their carbon footprint.

With its 10 "commandments", A Contract with the Earth calls for politicians to abandon adversarial politics and for business and conservationists to form compatible partnerships. In one of the book's themes, Gingrich and Maple argue that environmental efforts shouldn't be exclusive to one political philosophy and reject the idea that free enterprise and a cleaner world are opposing forces.

The book generated a storm of media attention in late 2007 and early 2008 as the U.S. presidential campaign began to heat up. Gingrich in particular made numerous media appearances arguing that the Republican Party was losing popular support because their response to environmental policy was simply, as he put it, "NO!" Maple toured the country as Gingrich's stand-in, most notably before the Republicans for Environmental Protection (REP, www.repamerica.org) during their annual meeting (at which John McCain was endorsed as the most "green" of the Republican presidential candidates). In 2008 Gingrich published another book that advocated oil drilling, Drill Here, Drill Now, Pay Less, and many pundits called his environmental commitment into question. However, this book's fifth chapter provided an argument for environmental protection. Like many aspects of Gingrich's career, his interest in environmental issues has generated controversy.

The book, whose title is similar to Gingrich's co-authored book Contract with America, criticizes the Democratic Party's legislation and litigation on environmental protection issues.

== Authors ==
Gingrich has been described by Katharine Mieszkowski as a "green conservative." He is the former Speaker of House of Representatives, and Maple is president and CEO of the Palm Beach Zoo and professor of conservation and behavior at the Georgia Institute of Technology. Wilson is a prize-winning conservation biologist and author.
