= Center for Health Transformation =

- Industry: professional services organization
- Founded: 2003
- Key people: Reynold Jennings

Center for Health Transformation (CHT) was a member and partner based professional services organization that focused on issues affecting the quality, cost, access and delivery of healthcare in the legislative and regulatory environment of the Patient Protection and Affordable Care Act (PPACA) in which multi-hospital healthcare organizations currently operate. CHT envisioned itself as a learning network, connecting with academic institutions such as Georgia State University and Kennesaw State University to create learning laboratories.

== History ==
Center for Health Transformation (CHT) was re-envisioned in 2012 by WellStar Health System president and CEO, Reynold Jennings, as a means to leverage the collective talent of various healthcare systems, which would collaboratively approach significant problems in healthcare. Jennings believed that transforming healthcare requires multiple, independent viewpoints that analyze case studies from dissimilar clinical silos.

The reinvented CHT focused on a multivariate approach to specific clinical challenges, and created adoptable, repeatable solutions for all of its member institutions. In a transparent format, participating systems identified workable solutions for duplication at member hospitals, within the model of "operationalize sustainable best practices", thus attempting to improve the quality of care while simultaneously lowering costs.

On November 14, 2012, WellStar Health System acquired the rights to the trademark, trade name and website address of CHT. The previous CHT was a healthcare think tank established by former U.S. House of Representatives Speaker Newt Gingrich in 2003. Formerly, the CHT model was a for-profit entity whose primary mission was to be a non-partisan collaboration of private and public sector leaders committed to creating a 21st-century intelligent health system that saves lives and saves money for all Americans. CHT is dormant as of January 2018.
