= Understanding Trump =

Nonfiction book by Newt Gingrich

- Author: Newt Gingrich
- Language: English
- Subject: Donald Trump
- Publisher: Center Street
- Publication date: June 13, 2017
- Publication place: United States
- Media type: Print
- Pages: 368
- ISBN: 978-1-4789-2308-4
- Preceded by: A Nation Like No Other (2011)

Understanding Trump is a 2017 book about Donald Trump, the 45th president of the United States, by Newt Gingrich.

== Synopsis ==
Newt Gingrich describes his time being with Donald Trump during his 2016 campaign. The book also contains a foreword written by Trump's son, Eric Trump.

== Writing ==
Speechwriters Joe DeSantis and Louie Brogdon developed the first draft for Understanding Trump.

== Reception ==
In the first week of its release, Understanding Trump sold over 37,000 copies. The book eventually topped The New York Times' Hardcover Non-Fiction Best Sellers list on July 2.

Jake Nevins of The Guardian wrote that the book is "filled with Gingrichian platitudes of this sort. They don't exactly help us "understand Trump," though they do offer a look into the rhetorical acrobatics one might employ to defend the indefensible." Meanwhile, Alexander Nazaryan of Newsweek noted that Gingrich used the word "elites" about 50 times, but does not explain the meaning of the word. Nazaryan also noted that Gingrich included conservatives such as George H. W. Bush and George W. Bush as part of the "elite left".
