= To Save America =

2010 book by Newt Gingrich

To Save America: Stopping Obama's Secular-Socialist Machine
- Author: Newt Gingrich
- Language: English
- Subject: Politics of the United States
- Publisher: Regnery Publishing
- Publication date: May 17, 2010 (hardback); January 3, 2011 (paperback)
- Publication place: United States
- Pages: 356
- ISBN: 978-1-59698-596-4
- Preceded by: Principles for a Successful Life: From Our Family to Yours (2009)
- Followed by: A Nation Like No Other (2011)

To Save America: Stopping Obama's Secular-Socialist Machine is a 2010 non-fiction book by former Speaker of the House and conservative activist Newt Gingrich, offering a critical view of supposed secular and socialist influences on American liberalism and the Democratic Party. It was a New York Times bestseller.

== Overview ==
To Save America focuses on secular and socialist ideas which, Gingrich writes, are entrenched in modern American liberalism. Acknowledging that his ideas "will be controversial," Gingrich coins the phrase "secular-socialist machine" to describe the current state of American liberal governance, especially the domestic policies and initiatives of President Barack Obama. According to Gingrich, the American political left can only be understood by considering the "interlocking relationship of secularism, socialism and machine politics."

In the book, Gingrich explains how the "secular-socialist machine" can be seen in the passage of the Patient Protection and Affordable Care Act ("Obamacare") and alleged scandals such as ACORN voter registration fraud. He also tells how the Left sides with "big business" against small business and why "there is no liberty without religious liberty".

According to Gingrich, the influence of left-leaning politicians and government regulations has left the United States in a dire position, both in terms of the economy and the ideals instilled by the Founding Fathers. Some of these ideals include the importance of work ethic, private property rights and localism. Describing the current political situation, he writes that the "danger to America is greater than anything I dreamed possible after we won the Cold War and the Soviet Union disappeared in December 1991."

Gingrich also spends several chapters outlining his policy prescriptions for reviving the American economy, fixing the U.S. health care system and protecting religious liberty, among other issues. He argues that the existing bureaucratic systems in Washington and state capitals are so broken and so resistant to change that they must be "replaced — not reformed — if we want to remain competitive globally in the twenty-first century."

A late chapter, "Why the Tea Party Movement is Good For America," addresses the rise of the Tea Party movement, and praises the efforts of local and national groups to stand up to what he characterizes as the leftward shift in American politics. Gingrich also writes: "Remarkably, like the British in 1773, the elite media today misunderstand and mock the frustration of American tea partiers." Another chapter towards the end of the book describes the importance of the Second Amendment to American freedom.

== Reception ==
The book was received favorably by conservative-leaning reviewers and negatively by liberal-oriented ones. Writing for Human Events, Donald Lambro stated that Gingrich's book "offers a futuristic agenda for reform that speaks to the angst and anger that is driving a mounting anti-government, anti-incumbent, anti-big-spending movement in this year’s midterm elections."

From a critical perspective, What's the Matter with Kansas? author Thomas Frank—who does praise Gingrich as being "ready with policy suggestions, actual steps the nation might take to translate the conservative sensibility into a ruling philosophy"—takes issue with what he calls Gingrich's "conversion to the devil theory of Barack Obama" and an exclusive focus on political corruption among Democratic politicians.

Following its release, To Save America reached number two on The New York Times' hardcover non-fiction bestseller list.
