= A Nation Like No Other =

2011 political book by Newt Gingrich

- Author: Newt Gingrich
- Language: English
- Subject: Politics of the United States
- Publisher: Regnery Publishing
- Publication date: June 13, 2011
- Publication place: United States
- Pages: 264
- ISBN: 978-1596982710
- Preceded by: To Save America (2010)
- Followed by: Understanding Trump (2017)

A Nation Like No Other: Why American Exceptionalism Matters is a political nonfiction book by American politician and author Newt Gingrich. It deals with American exceptionalism, and how the modern-day conservative take on the theorem relates to that of the Founding Fathers.
