= Sean Theriault =

American professor

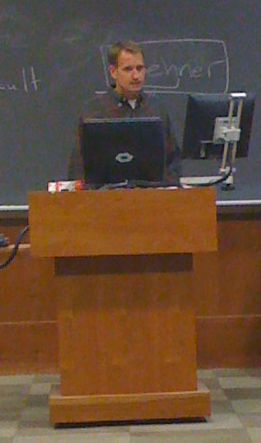
- Sean Theriault teaching at the University of Texas
- Born: February 6, 1972
- Education: B.A. from University of Richmond; M.S. from University of Rochester; M.A. and Ph.D. from Stanford University
- Occupations: Author, professor
- Writing career
- Genre: Political science
- Website: seantheriault.com

Sean Theriault is a professor in the Department of Government at the University of Texas, Austin. He specializes in American politics with particular interests focusing on the U.S. Congress, American political development, and political history. He is a 2004 winner of the Eyes of Texas Excellence Award.

Theriault has published articles on presidential rhetoric, congressional careers, issue framing, the Compromise of 1850, and public approval of Congress. His current research is on the party polarization in the U.S. Congress.

== Books ==
- Theriault, Sean M. The Gingrich Senators: the roots of partisan warfare in Congress Oxford : Oxford University Press, 2013,
- Theriault, Sean M. Party Polarization in Congress. Cambridge: Cambridge University Press, 2008.According to WorldCat, the book is held in 428 libraries
- Theriault, Sean M. The Power of the People: Congressional Competition, Public Attention, and Voter Retribution. Columbus: Ohio State University Press, 2005. ISBN 9780814290705
