= The Art of Transformation (book) =

Book by Newt Gingrich

- First edition
- Author: Newt Gingrich, Nancy Desmond
- Publisher: CHT Press
- Publication date: 2006
- ISBN: 9781933966007

The Art of Transformation (ISBN 9781933966007) is a 2006 book by former U.S. House Speaker Newt Gingrich and Nancy Desmond. It deals with American political topics.
