= Rediscovering God in America =

Book by Newt Gingrich

- Revised Edition with Photography Hardcover
- Author: Newt Gingrich
- Illustrator: Callista Gingrich (photos)
- Language: English
- Subject: American History
- Publisher: Thomas Nelson Inc.
- Publication date: November 24, 2009
- Publication place: United States
- Media type: Print (Hardcover)
- Pages: 118 (Hardcover revised edition)
- ISBN: 1-59555-313-4 (Hardcover revised edition)

Rediscovering God in America is a book written by former House Speaker Newt Gingrich with photography from his wife Callista Gingrich. and a film series based upon the book and narrated by the two Gingriches. The book was a New York Times bestseller.

== Synopsis ==
From the National Archives and Capitol Building to Arlington National Cemetery and Library of Congress, the Gingriches lead the reader on a tour of Washington, D.C. to point out the religious beliefs incorporated in the Nation's monuments. The role of religion in the United States' founding is examined and explained. Gingrich's tour is based in part on the controversial ideas of right-wing historian David Barton, which Bruce Wilson claims include "misleading and inaccurate claims".

== Critical response ==
Publishers Weekly found the book's argument "predictable". However, the magazine praised the idea of basing the book on the tour of Washington, saying this "structure does much to freshen up a book that is otherwise indistinguishable from prior offerings". In The New York Times, Andrew Ferguson said it "had the potential to be charming" and finds Callista Gingrich's photographs to be "lovely" and the book's production to be "elegant", but is otherwise scathing. The New York Review of Books commented it was "an item meant to be sold in the gift shops on the Mall as a sort of earphone substitute and eventual souvenir."

== Film series ==
Citizens United and Gingrich Productions have produced two "Rediscovering God in America" films, hosted by Newt and Callista Gingrich. Gingrich decided to make the film in part as a riposte to the success of liberal documentarist Michael Moore; he had the help of Citizens United's David Bossie who was an experienced maker of polemical films.

Rediscovering God in America

Rediscovering God in America was produced in 2008, with Newt and Callista Gingrich narrating as the book illustrates the importance of "our Creator" to America's founders and their successors. Based on the New York Times bestseller, Rediscovering God in America, this documentary seeks to remind viewers that the United States is indeed “One Nation Under God.”

By June 2011, the film had sold between 300,000 and 400,000 units.

Rediscovering God in America II: Our Heritage

This second book in the series premiered in September 2009 at the Washington Visitor Center, hosted by the author and his wife. The film explores “the role of religion in early [United States of] America and the belief that ‘our Creator’ is the source of our liberty, prosperity, and survival as an exceptional nation. From the first permanent English settlement at Jamestown in 1607, through the American Revolution, to the end of the Civil War in 1865, this film tells the story of the deep faith that motivated and sustained our great leaders, and dramatically presents our nation’s belief in religious freedom.” In contrast to the first film, they are careful to talk about religion in general rather than privileging one faith.

== Conferences ==
Gingrich has also held a series of conferences around the USA on the themes of the book, including in Virginia Beach in 2009 and Iowa in 2011. Mike Huckabee, Newt Gingrich, David Barton, and Haley Barbour addressed the Iowa conference. Speakers in Virginia included Ron Luce, Mike Huckabee, Newt Gingrich, David Barton, Oliver North, and Bob McEwen.
