= Seal of Los Angeles =

Official seal of the City of Los Angeles

Seal of the City of Los Angeles
- The seal of Los Angeles (approximation)

Versions
- The lesser coat of arms of Los Angeles (approximation) as used by the Government
- Armiger: City of Los Angeles
- Adopted: 1905; 121 years ago
- Shield: Quarterly: 1 United States, 2 California, 3 Mexico, 4 Spain
- Use: On executive directives, commissions, and more

The Seal of the City of Los Angeles is, since 1905, the official seal of the City of Los Angeles, a city located in the southern portion of the U.S. state of California.

The escutcheon is encircled by the legal name of the city (City of Los Angeles) and year founded (1781). It was adopted on March 27, 1905, via Ordinance 10,834.

== Symbolism ==
The heraldic blazon of the coat of arms, as declared in the 1905 ordinance, is: Inside the ribbon, flanking the escutcheon, are grapes, olives, and oranges, major crops of California, on their plants. These are also symbolized in the colors of the flag of Los Angeles. The fruit are on a field or, bordered with a 77-bead rosary, which represents Spanish missions in California.

The arms are quarterly:

- 1st quarter: the lesser coat of arms of the United States. A field paleways of thirteen pieces argent and gules; chief, azure charged with thirteen five rays argent.
- 2nd quarter: the flag of the California Republic (1846) A field argent with a bear gules at bay, five rays gules, and fess base gules, sans text and ground.
- 3rd quarter: the coat of arms of Mexico (1823-1864). An eagle displayed reguardant and biting a serpent, symbolizing Mexican rule from 1822 until 1846.
- 4th quarter: the lesser coat of arms of Spain (1785-1873). The coats of arms of Castile and León, symbolizing Spanish rule from 1542 until 1821.

== See also ==
- List of U.S. county and city insignia
