= Minarets and Western Railway =

Minarets and Western Railway Company
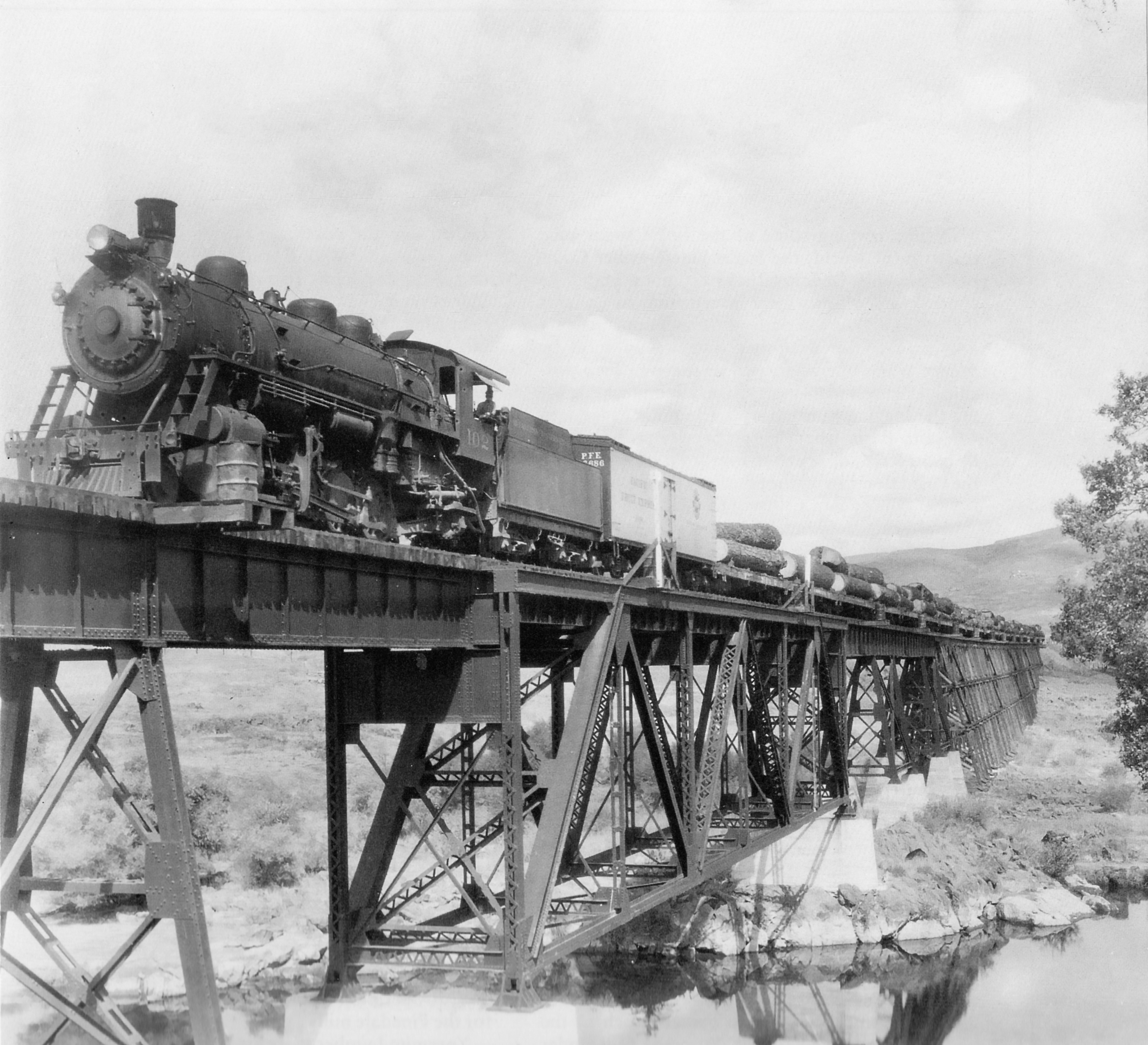
- Locomotive 102 hauling a load of log cars to the Pinedale Mill.

Overview
- Parent company: Sugar Pine Lumber Company
- Headquarters: Pinedale, California
- Reporting mark: M&W
- Locale: Fresno County, California, Madera County, California
- Dates of operation: 1921–1933
- Successor: Southern Pacific Lines

Technical
- Track gauge: 4 ft 8 1/2 in (1,435 mm) standard gauge
- Length: 53 mi (85 km)

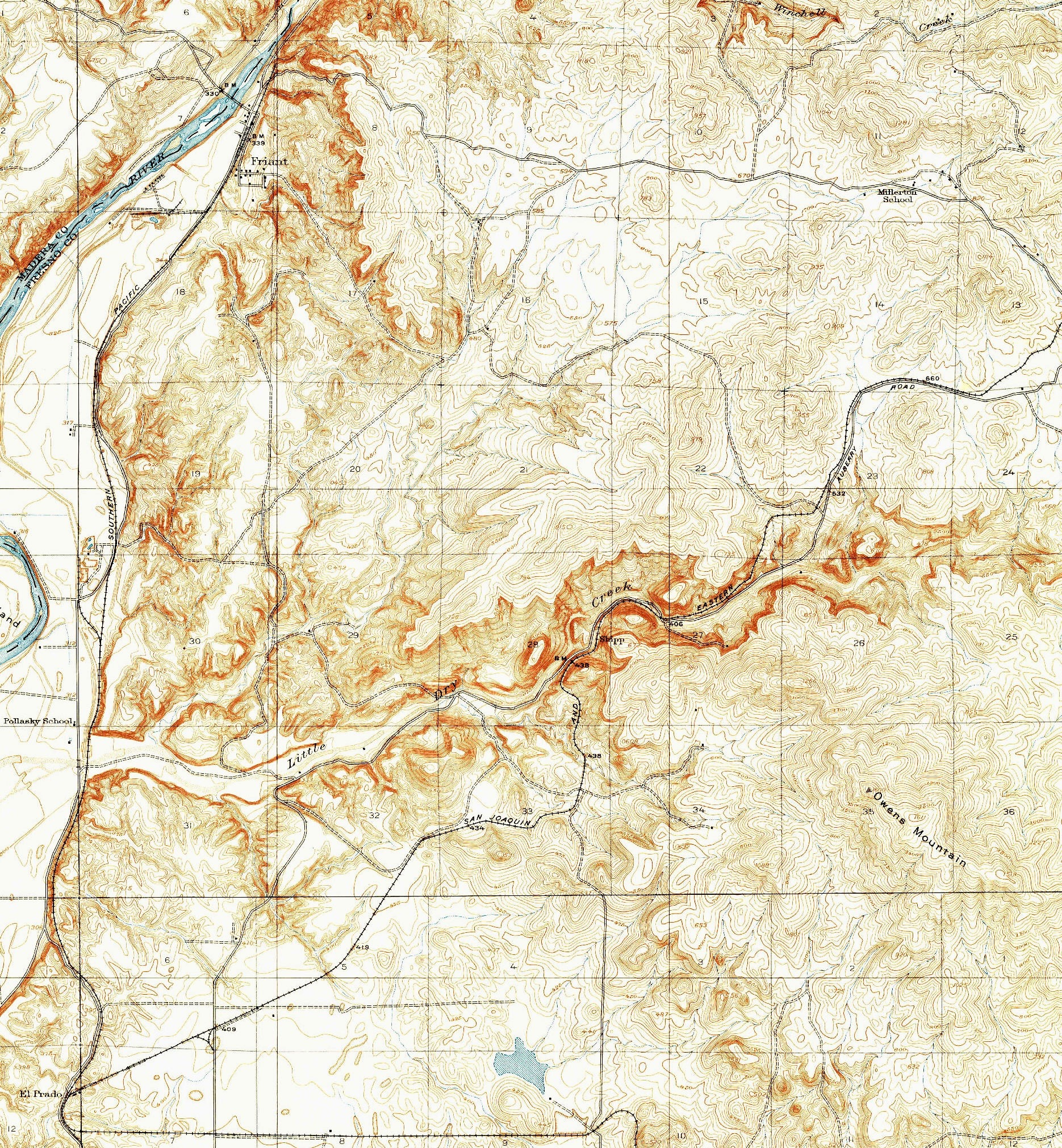
Route in 1922 near Friant

The Minarets and Western Railway (reporting mark M&W) was a Class II common carrier that operated in Fresno County, California, from 1921 to 1933. The railway was owned by the Sugar Pine Lumber Company and was built the same year the lumber company was incorporated so that it could haul timber from the forest near Minarets (northeast of Friant) to its sawmill at Pinedale (near Fresno). The southern portion of the line was operated with joint trackage rights with Southern Pacific.

During the Great Depression, in 1933 the lumber company went bankrupt. The track north of Friant was abandoned and the Pinedale Branch was bought by Southern Pacific, where it was later known as the Pinedale Spur of the Clovis Branch. Southern Pacific later sold the spur and Clovis Branch to the San Joaquin Valley Railroad (SJVR). SJVR abandoned the line in the 1990s and today the Pinedale Spur is preserved as the Fresno-Clovis Rail Trail.

== History ==
In July 1921, the Sugar Pine Lumber Company formed. They secured timber tracts but could not secure the water rights necessary to build a log flume. Instead, they built a railroad to haul logs out of the mountains.

The Minarets and Western Railroad connected Wishon and Pinedale, their future mill site. From there, finished lumber could reach global markets via the Southern Pacific Railroad.

The Minarets and Western incorporated as a common carrier standard gauge railroad. This was to secure the right-of-way through privately held ranches at fixed rates. Doing so put the railroad under the Interstate Commerce Commission. This required the M&W to offer passenger and freight service. This was a formality as the area had less than 600 people to serve. Passenger service was intermittent, and a passenger depot was never built. The line passed through no major towns and had no commercial traffic other than lumber.

Minarets and Western began service in 1922 at an estimated cost of three and a half million dollars.

A second railroad above Bass Lake opened the same year. The Sugar Pine Railroad connected Wishon to the timber operations at Central Camp. Both railroads used standard gauge track and shared the same flatcars. But different locomotives were used in the mountains.

=== Pinedale Branch ===
The 4.7-mile (7.6 km) Pinedale Branch ran west from Pinedale Junction (today at North Willow Avenue at East Shephard Avenue, Fresno) on the Southern Pacific, to its lumber mill. The branch ran west along the north side of Shephard Avenue. Just west of Millbrook Avenue the railroad crossed Shephard heading in a southwest direction toward Fresno/Pinedale. The depot at Pinedale was located near Highway 41 and East Nees Avenue. Today a granite monument (California State Historical Landmark #934) is at that depot/camp location in remembrance of the internment of Japanese-Americans during World War II. Pinedale was the destination where the Japanese disembarked the trains for their internment camps.

== In the movies ==
Minarets and Western Railway rolling stock was used in the filming of "Carnival Boat" (1932), which starred Bill Boyd and Ginger Rogers. In action scenes featuring Boyd and other actors atop flatcars carrying loads of timber, the film is intentionally reversed, making it difficult to read the "Minarets and Western Railway" markings. The designation "M & W" is readable at times, and the locomotive is marked "Sugar Pine Lumber Co."

== Locomotives ==
The Minarets and Western railroad had four Mikado type steam locomotives. Each met the rules and regulations of the Interstate Commerce Commission. This allowed M&W to maintain common carrier status despite the line operating like a de facto private contract carrier.

Name	Images	Builder	Type	Date	Shop number	Notes
101		ALCO	2-8-2	August 1920	61858	The Oregon-American Lumber Company ordered this locomotive in 1920. They refused delivery once they discovered how poorly suited it was for forest work. The Sugar Pine Lumber company purchased the engine in 1921. The Southern Pacific absorbed the Minarets and Western Railway and retained the 101. Later, the Birmingham Rail & Locomotive bought the engine. They later sold it to the Aberdeen & Rockfish as their No. 40. It now operates excursion trains on the Valley Railroad in Essex, Connecticut.
102		ALCO	2-8-2	February 1923	64144	Built for the Minarets & Western Railway Company with an empty weight of 262,800 pounds (119,200 kg), the #102 was sold to the Southern Pacific in 1935. The engine worked as a switcher in the SP Dunsmuir yards until 1953.
103		ALCO	2-8-2	February 1923	64145	Built for the Minarets & Western Railway Company with an empty weight of 262,800 pounds (119,200 kg), the #102 was sold to the Southern Pacific in 1935. Later, the Atlanta & St. Andrews Bay bought the engine. They sold it to Chicago & Illinois Midland as No. 527. The engine was scrapped in 1954.
104		ALCO	2-8-2	February 1923	64146	Built for the Minarets & Western Railway Company with an empty weight of 262,800 pounds (119,200 kg), the #102 was sold to the Southern Pacific in 1935. Later, the Long-Bell Lumber Company bought the engine as No. 3296. The engine was scrapped in 1957.

== Gallery ==
Locomotives of Minarets and Western Railway Company

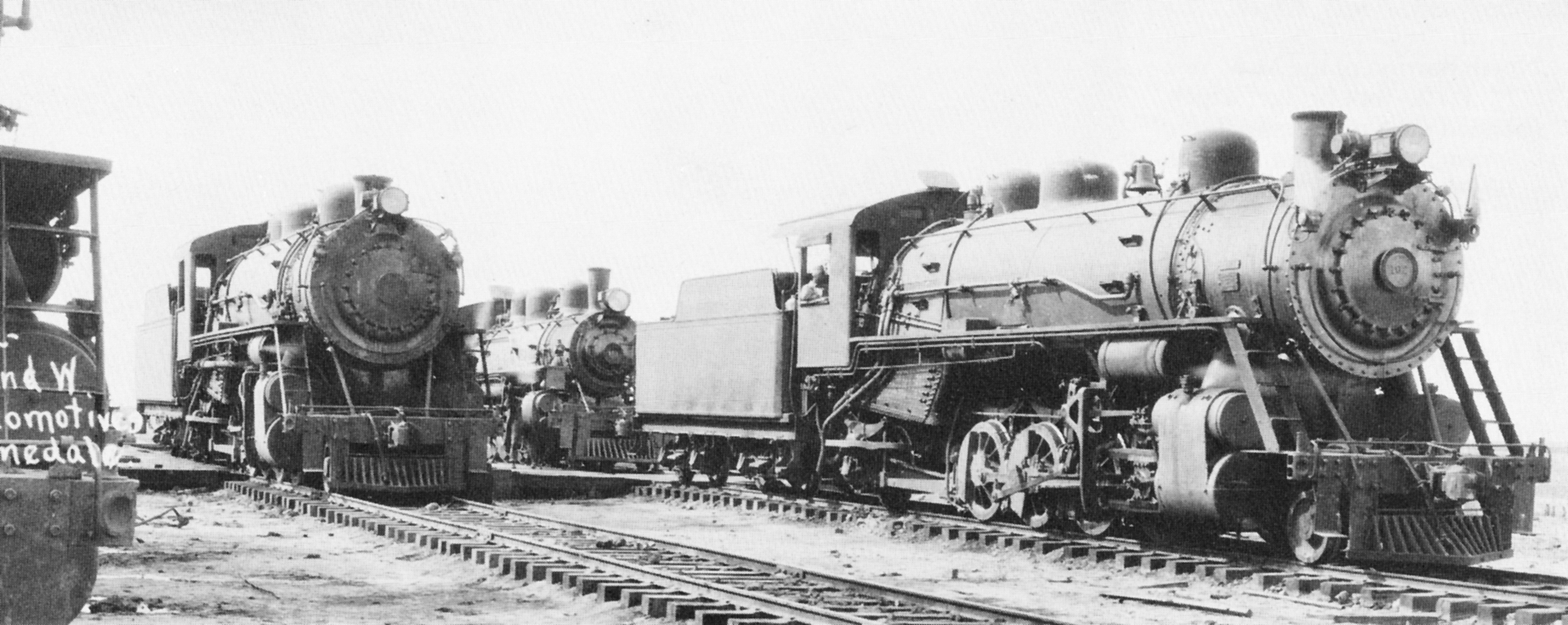
The Minarets and Western Locomotives 102 and 103 stand in front of 101 in Pinedale.

== Trusteeship & Liquidation ==
The closure of the Sugar Pine Lumber Company in 1933 wiped out the vast majority of income for the railroad. Minarets and Western missed bond payments and taxes in 1932. It entered trusteeship in 1934. That year, the Interstate Commerce Commission allowed the line from Wishon to Friant to be abandoned. Scrapping started in 1936 with the last rails taken up at Friant in 1939. The four and a half miles from Pinedale to Pinedale Junction became a part of the Southern Pacific Railroad.

Locomotive No. 101 remained in service with the Southern Pacific. The remaining three locomotives went to other carriers.
