= Flag of Los Angeles =

City of Los Angeles
- Flag of Los Angeles, California
- "Fiesta Flag"
- Use: Other
- Adopted: July 22, 1931
- Design: A vertical tricolor with green (left), gold (center) and red (right), each with zig-zagged edges, and the city seal in the center
- Designed by: Roy E. Silent and E.S. Jones

The city flag of Los Angeles consists of a background of three notched stripes of green, gold and red. The flag was designed by Roy E. Silent and E.S. Jones in 1931 for the Los Angeles sesquicentennial from 1781.

== Design and symbolism ==
The three colors on the flag represent olive trees (green), orange groves (gold) and vineyards (red). They also symbolize the history of the city, with gold and red representing Spain, the country who founded the city and green and red representing Mexico, who took over when New Spain achieved independence. The city seal is shown in the center of the flag. Surrounding the shield are representations of three major Californian crops: grapes, olives, and oranges. The seal contains a heraldic shield quartered showing:

1. an approximation of the shield shown on the Great Seal of the United States, though the blue chief features thirteen stars;
2. an approximation of the flag of California;
3. an approximation of the coat of arms of Mexico;
4. a tower and lion of the Kingdom of Castile and the Kingdom of León, representing the arms of Spain.

The flag evokes mixed reactions, with some disliking the design, and some praising it. Many of the staff at LAist/KPCC criticized it in 2019. Ted Kaye, an author of "Good" Flag, "Bad" Flag, a booklet endorsed by the North American Vexillological Association, described Los Angeles' flag as a "failed image" that fails to spark pride and unity in the city. He criticized its use of the city seal while praising the serrated green, gold, and red stripes.

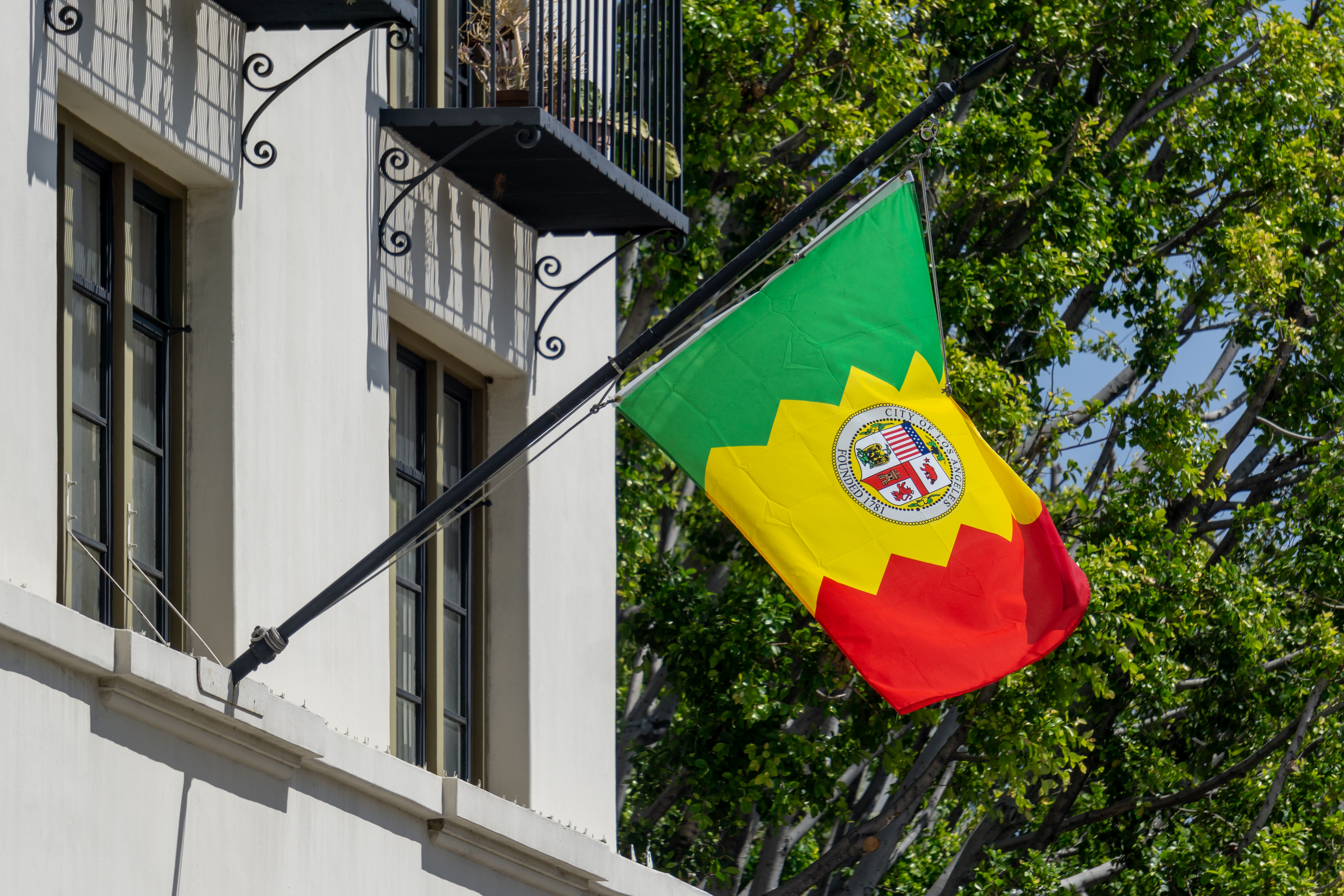
The flag of Los Angeles mounted outside the historic Eugene Biscailuz Building

== History ==
Unofficial flag (pre 1907)

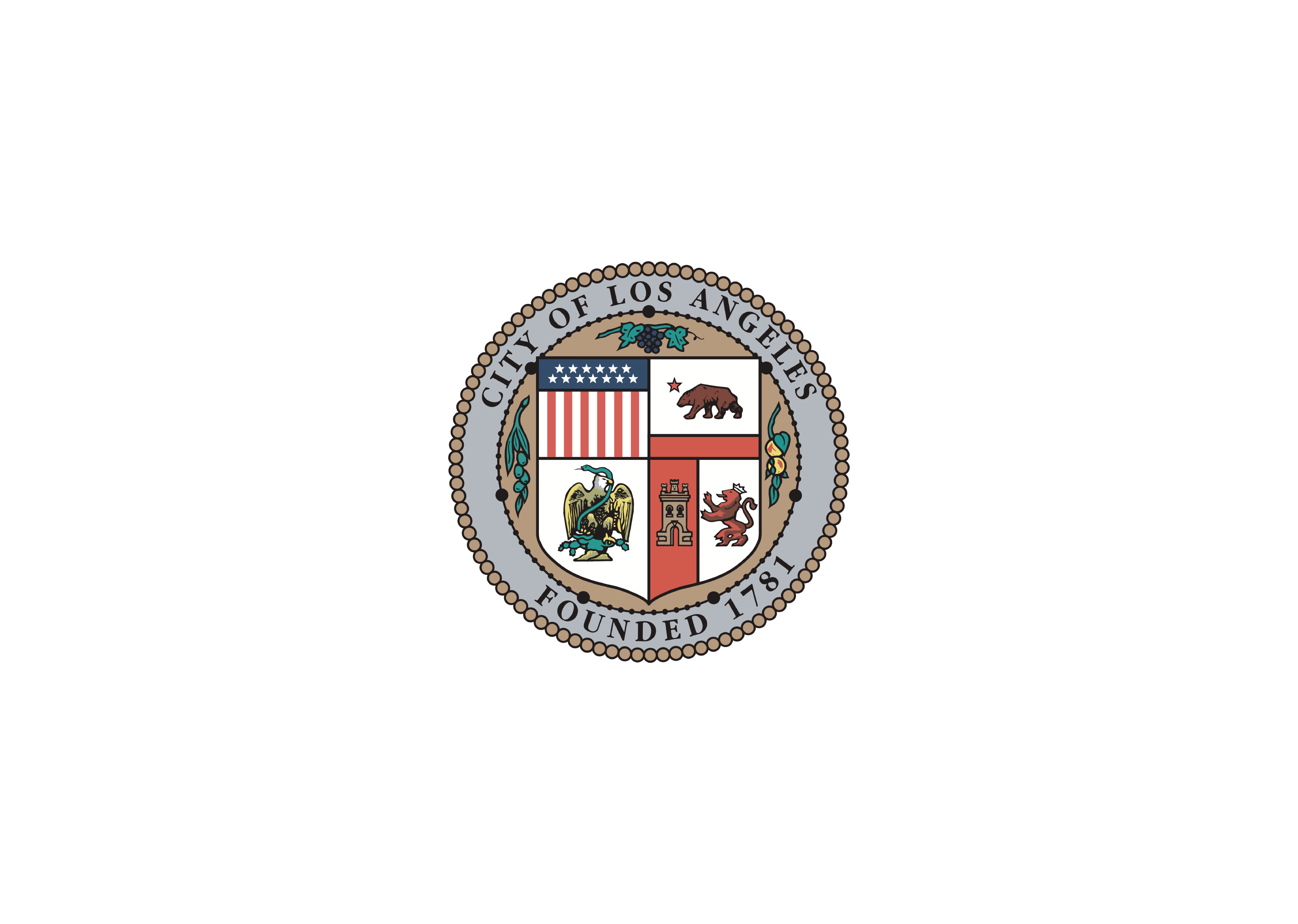
Digital reconstruction of the city flag from 1928

The first city flag was made in 1928 and was described as containing the city's seal in the center of its field.

The Second flag was designed by Roy E. Silent and E.S. Jones. It was presented to the city by the La Fiesta Association for the city's sesquicentennial anniversary. The seal on the flag was officially adopted on March 27, 1905. In 1913 the police department adopted a flag that was described as: "...city seal worked in gold on a background of blue silk..."

The flag received brief international prominence when, during the closing of the 1980 Moscow Olympics, it was raised instead of the United States flag as a symbol of the next Olympic host. The move was done upon the request of the United States government, which asked the International Olympic Committee to not use the American flag because the U.S. had boycotted the Moscow Olympics.

A Los Angeles flag was taken to space in 1984 by Sally Ride, on the Space Shuttle Challenger. It is on display in the Los Angeles City Hall.

In a 2004 North American Vexillological Association survey, the design ranked 33rd out of 150 American city flags.

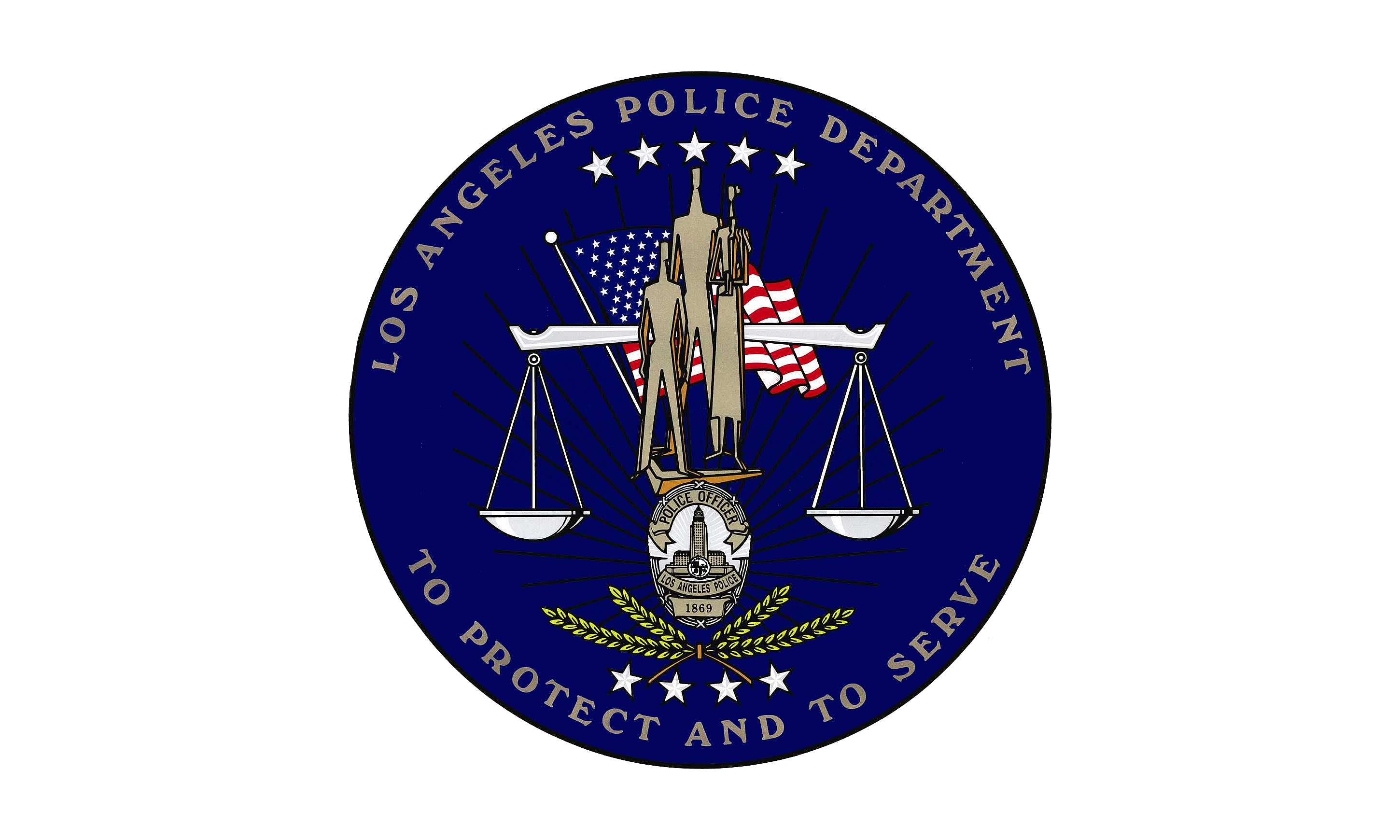
Flag of the Los Angeles Police Department.

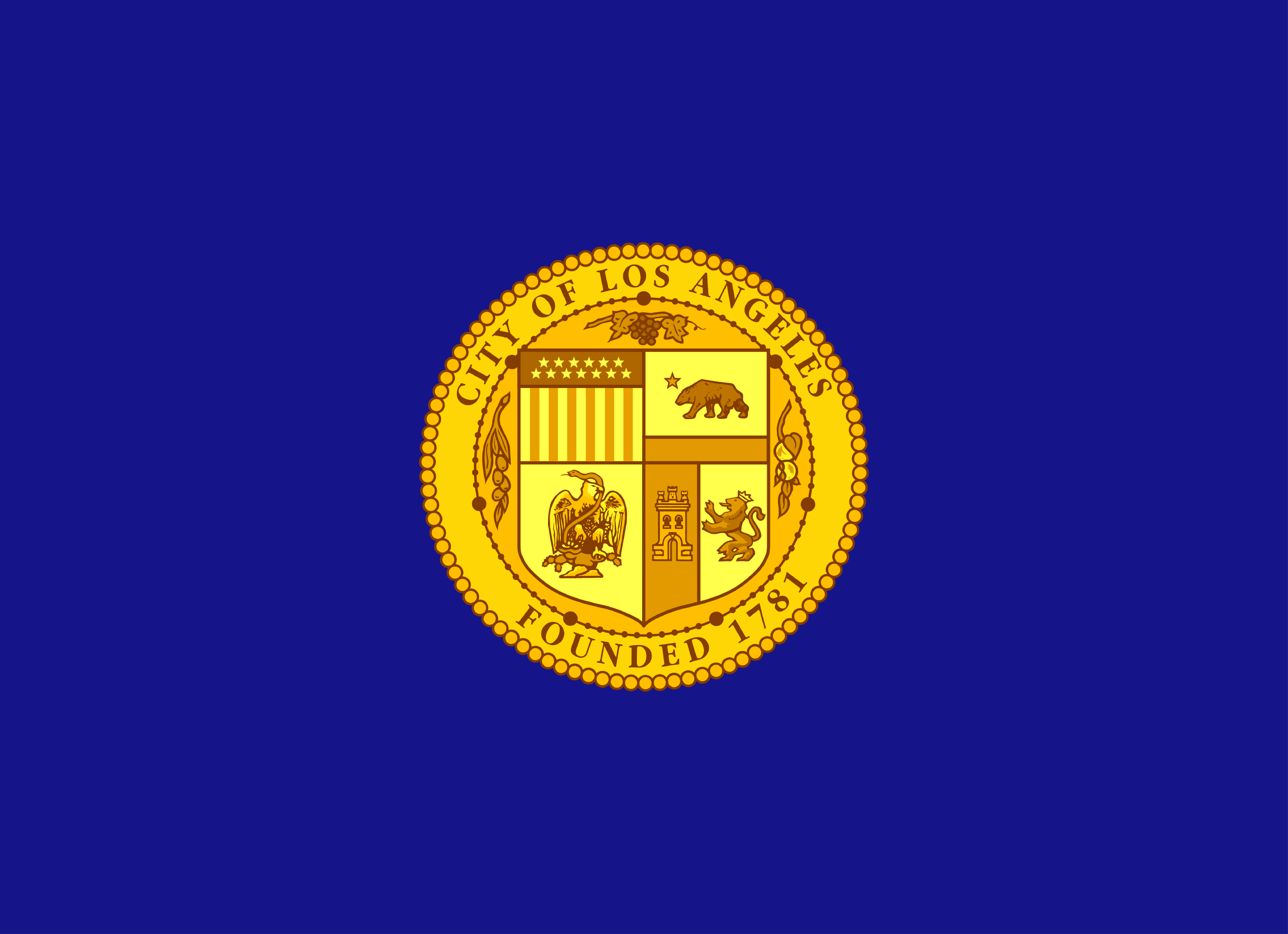
Digital reconstruction of Police Department flag from 1915

== See also ==
- Flag of San Diego County, California
