= Flag of San Diego =

City of San Diego
- Proportion: 3:5
- Adopted: October 16, 1934
- Design: The city seal in the center of a three color band. The colors are (from left to right) dark red, white, dark yellow.
- Designed by: Albert V. Mayrhofer
- Use: Occasionally used by the city government alongside the regular variant.
- Proportion: 3:5
- Design: Modification of the city flag with a partially inverted city seal and a gold outline of the text "1542."

The flag of San Diego consists of three vertical bands; colored from left to right; dark red, white and gold. The central white band carries the city seal, which carries the words: "The City of San Diego · State of California · Semper Vigilans." The last of those three phrases is the city's official motto, Latin for "ever vigilant." Under the seal is the number 1542, the year in which Juan Rodríguez Cabrillo first entered San Diego Bay and claimed the area for the Spanish Empire. The red and gold bands come from the colors of Spain's flag. The flag was adopted on October 16, 1934, by the City Council, after Albert V. Mayrhofer submitted a sample banner on behalf of the California Historical Association, the Native Sons of the Golden West, Native Daughters of the Golden West, and The San Diegans.

== Militia ==
Early militia in the city carried their own flags. Most of these were USA flags with names of militia and city written in the stripes.

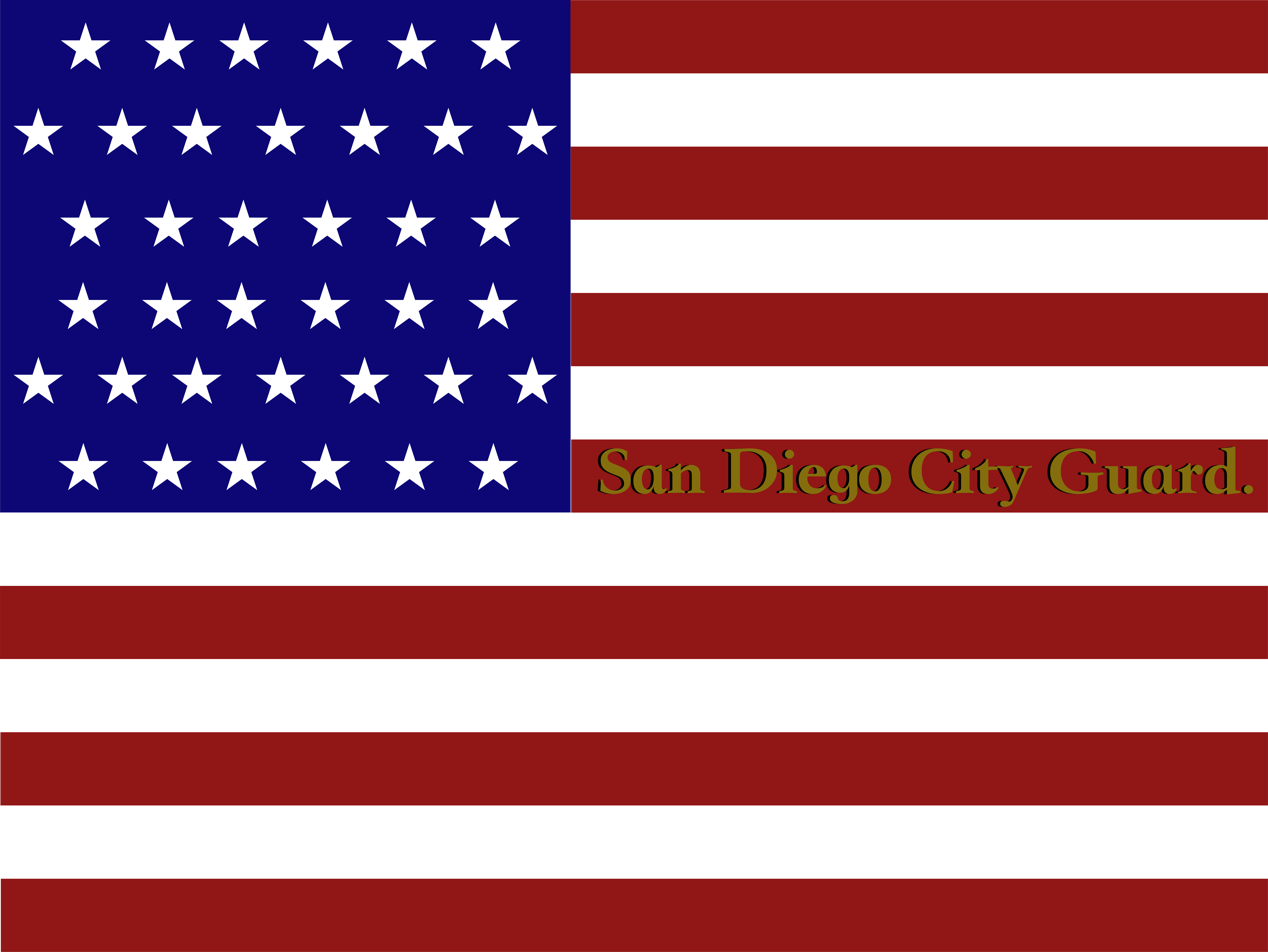
Flag used by the City Guard, 1881

Flag used by San Diego Minute Men regiment during the Spanish-American War 1898

== See also ==
- Flag of San Diego County, California
