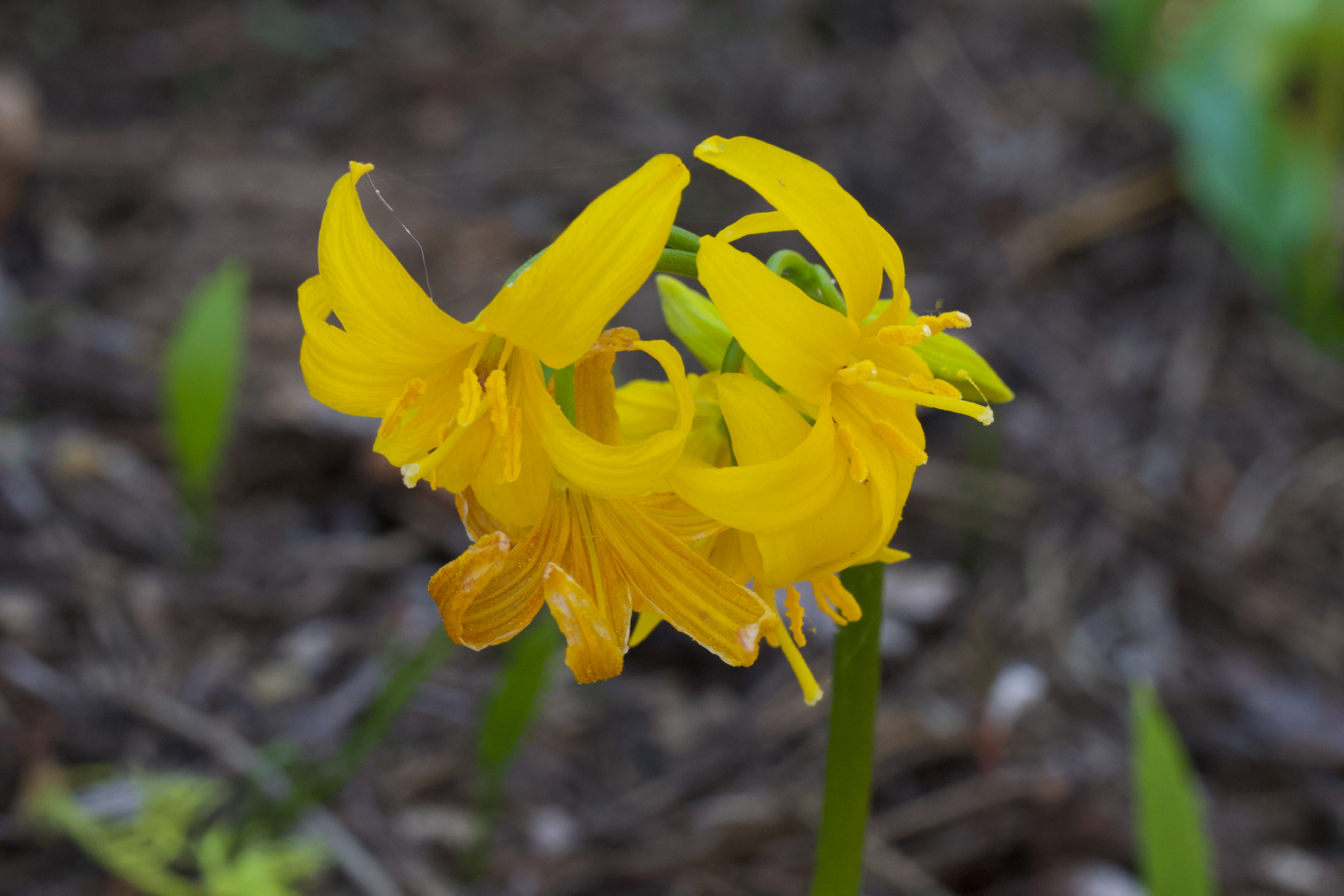

Conservation status
- Imperiled (NatureServe)

Scientific classification
- Kingdom: Plantae
- Clade: Tracheophytes
- Clade: Angiosperms
- Clade: Monocots
- Order: Liliales
- Family: Liliaceae
- Subfamily: Lilioideae
- Genus: Erythronium
- Species: E. pluriflorum

Binomial name
- Erythronium pluriflorum Shevock, Bartel & G.A.Allen

= Erythronium pluriflorum =

Species of flowering plant

Erythronium pluriflorum is a rare species of flowering plant in the lily family Liliaceae which is known by the common names manyflower fawn lily, golden fawn-lily, and Shuteye Peak fawn lily.

== Description ==
Erythronium pluriflorum is a wildflower growing from a bulb 4 to 7 centimeters wide. It produces two oval-shaped green leaves and erects thin, naked stalks which may be 8 to over 30 centimeters tall. Each stalk bears from one to ten flowers. The flower has bright yellow curly tepals, each one to three centimeters long which age to a brown or orange color. The other flower parts are also yellow.

== Distribution ==
It is endemic to California, in the central Sierra Nevada within eastern Madera County. It is known only from isolated populations on Chiquito Ridge and Shuteye Peak, in the San Joaquin River watershed. It is listed as an endangered species by the California Department of Fish and Wildlife and IUCN, and is on the California Native Plant Society Inventory of Rare and Endangered Plants.

The plant was not described until 1991.

== Conservation ==
This species is listed as imperiled due to a combination of factors. Firstly, its historic range is quite small. Erythronium pluriflorum is known from only six populations, all within the Sierra National Forest. Disruption from camping is a threat. However, climate change is the greatest threat to this species "as its habitat requirements include a sliver of area in the subalpine Sierra Nevadas."
