= Shuteye Peak =

Mountain in the American state of California

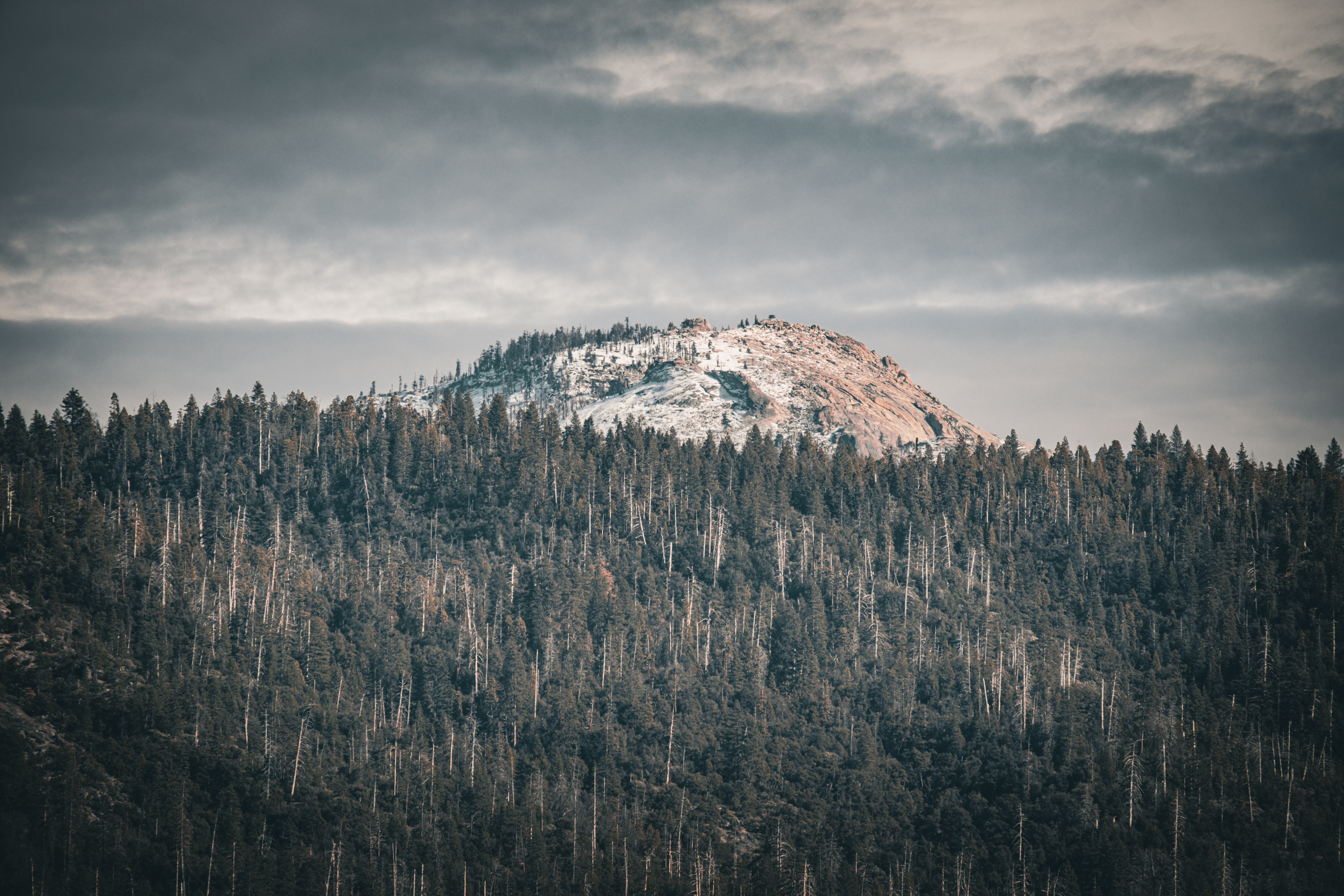
- Shuteye Peak seen from Bass Lake.

Highest point
- Elevation: 8,355 ft (2,547 m) NAVD 88
- Prominence: 1,311 ft (400 m)
- Coordinates: 37°20′57″N 119°25′36″W

Geography
- Location within California Location within the United States
- Location: Sierra National Forest, Madera County, California, U.S.
- Parent range: Sierra Nevada
- Topo map(s): USGS Shuteye Peak, CA

Climbing
- Easiest route: Trail hike (class 1)

Shuteye Peak is a mountain located in the Sierra National Forest in Madera County, California on the highest point of Chiquito Ridge. It is home to the first permanent fire lookout built in the Sierra Nevada.

Shuteye Peak is known for its panoramic views of the San Joaquin Valley, Mammoth Mountain, Bass Lake, and North Fork areas and is home to one of the last active fire lookouts in California. Today, Shuteye Peak operates as one of a triangle of lookouts in the Sierra National Forest's Bass Lake Ranger District with Miami Mountain and Signal Peak.

The peak is accessible by a main trailhead which begins north of Central Camp used by the United States Forest Service to supply the lookout by off-road vehicle. The trail is steep and technical with many exposed rock sections of quartz monzonite. It is popular with hikers and mountain bikers in the summer months.

== Toponym ==
The peak is named as the place of the first sleep, or Shuteye, by Native Americans who made camp there. Big Shuteye was the first stop-over in their seasonal migration. The sign of melting snow on the peak signaled that the high Sierra meadows above Chiquito Ridge were reachable.

== Fire Lookout ==
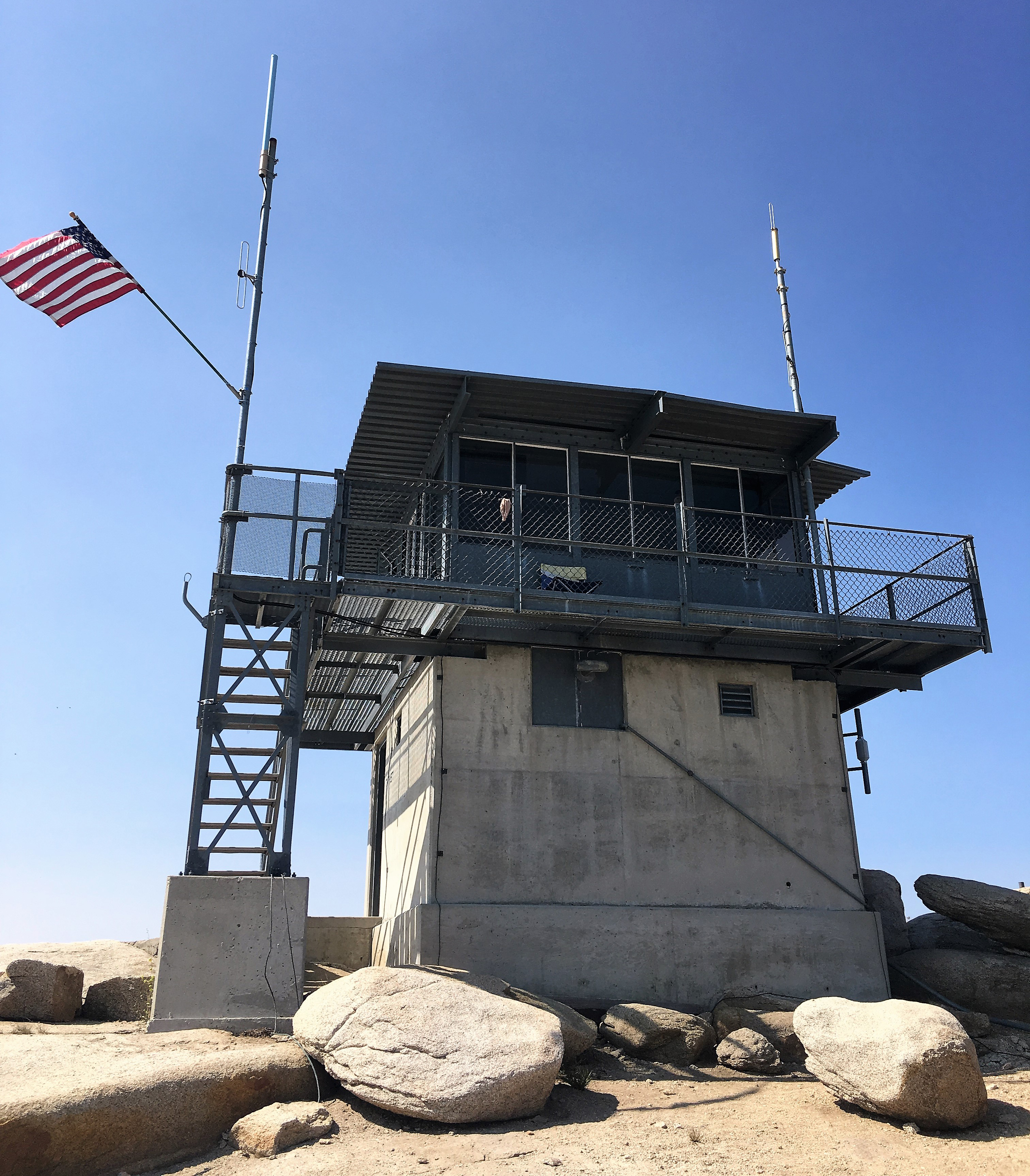
The Shuteye Peak Lookout tower.

Shuteye Lookout was established by the U.S. Forest Service in 1907. The lookout was the first of its kind in the Sierra. Daily hikes to the summit were required before a permanent structure was built in 1909. The availability of a permanent fire lookout station replaced the earlier practice of constant fire patrol by forest rangers. Firefighting was conducted under a co-operative agreement with the Fresno Flume and Lumber Company, the Madera Sugar Pine Company, the San Joaquin Light and Power Company, and the federal government. By 1912, a telephone line connected the lookout to ranger stations and the forest supervisors office in the San Joaquin Valley replacing the widespread use of heliographs.

The current structure was built in 1957 featuring a 14' x 14' foot steel cab with a flat roof standing on a 10' x 10' foot concrete block base. A weather station was added in 2012. Shuteye remains one of the few active lookouts in the Sierra Nevada. In 2017, Richard Bushnell, a seasonal U.S. Forest Service employee, was among the first to spot the Railroad Fire while stationed on Shuteye Peak. The forest surrounding Shuteye Peak was threatened by the Creek Fire in September 2020.

== Ecology ==
Shuteye Peak is surrounded by secondary growth forest to the south and west where 13,000 acres were clear-cut in the 1920s and early 1930s by the Sugar Pine Lumber Company. Shuteye Peaks' upper montane and subalpine forest is the only known habitat of the Shuteye Peak fawn lily which is listed as an endangered species by the California Department of Fish and Wildlife.

In the 1920s, the Shuteye Peak area was habitat to one of the last California grizzly bears. Known as "Two Toes," the bear had lost half of one of his front feet in a bear trap. Two Toes evaded hunters for several years.

== Forest Service Memorial ==
Six bronze plaques honoring early pioneers of the United States Forest Service are mounted near the summit on a large granite outcropping known as Pancake Rock. The plaques were installed by Walter Puhn, the National Forest Supervisor, for which the Old Forester tree in Nelder Grove is named.

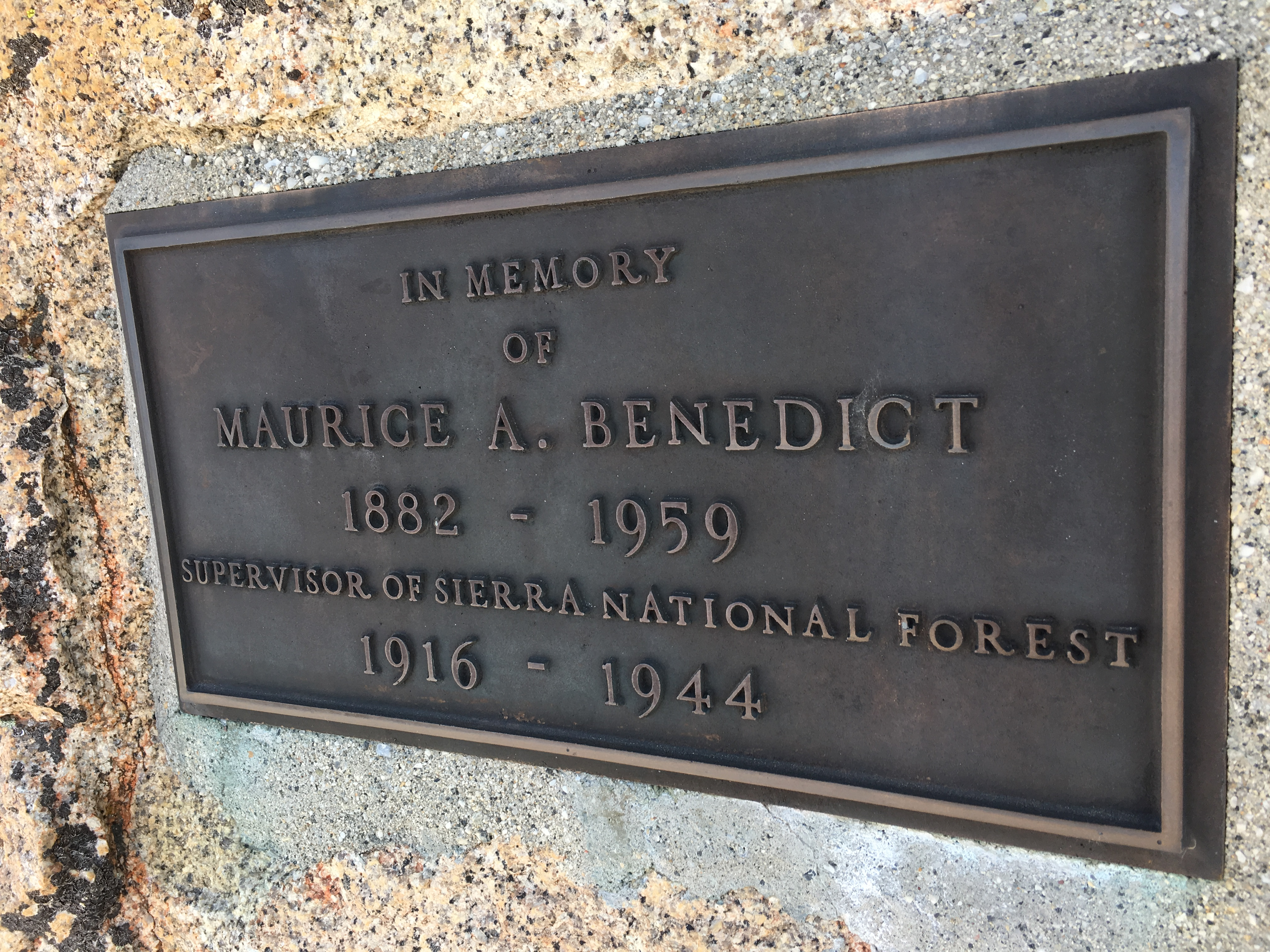
Maurice A. Benedict ran the Sierra National Forest as Forest Supervisor from 1916-1944.

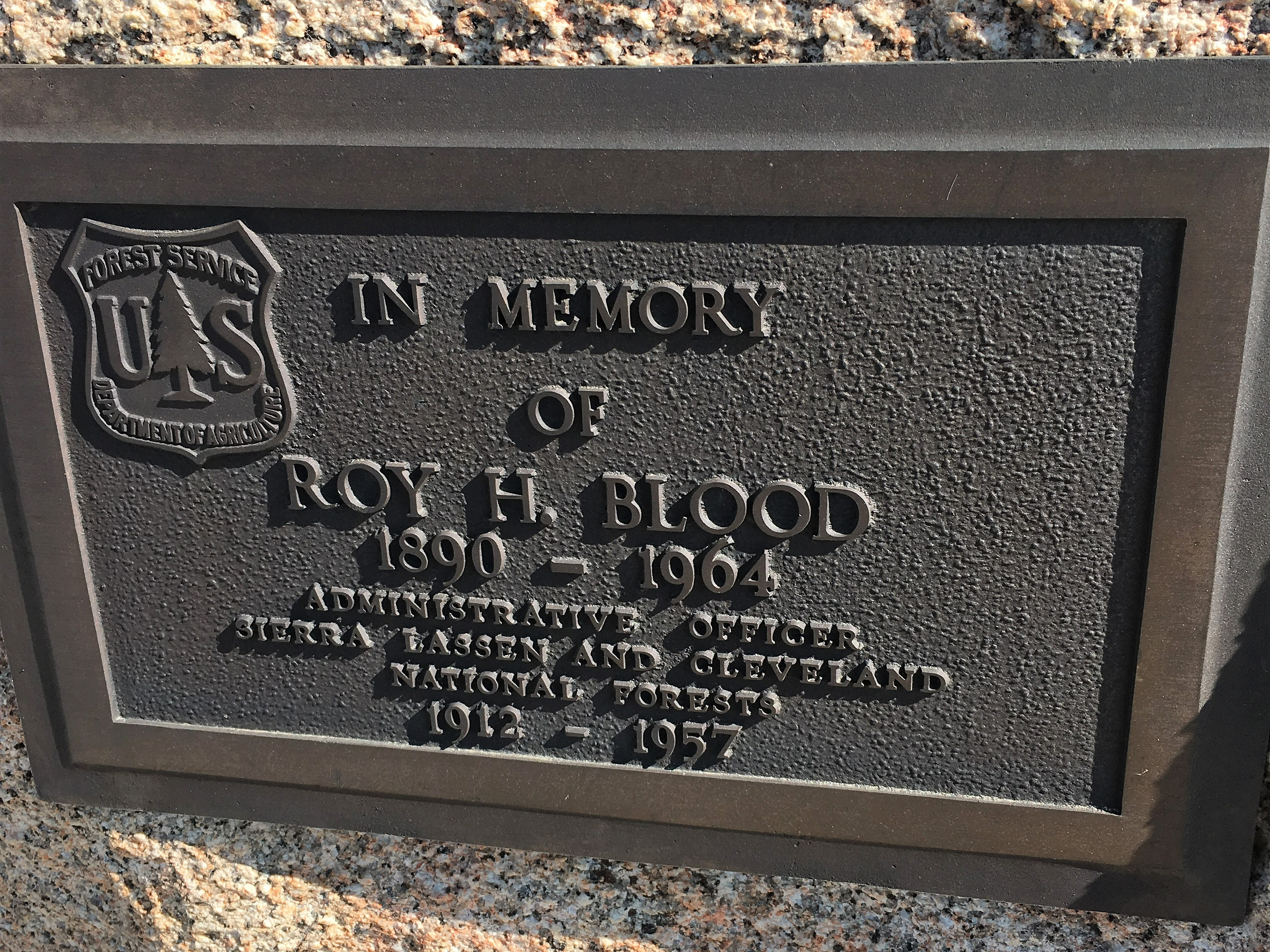
Roy H. Blood served as a forester for 40 years.

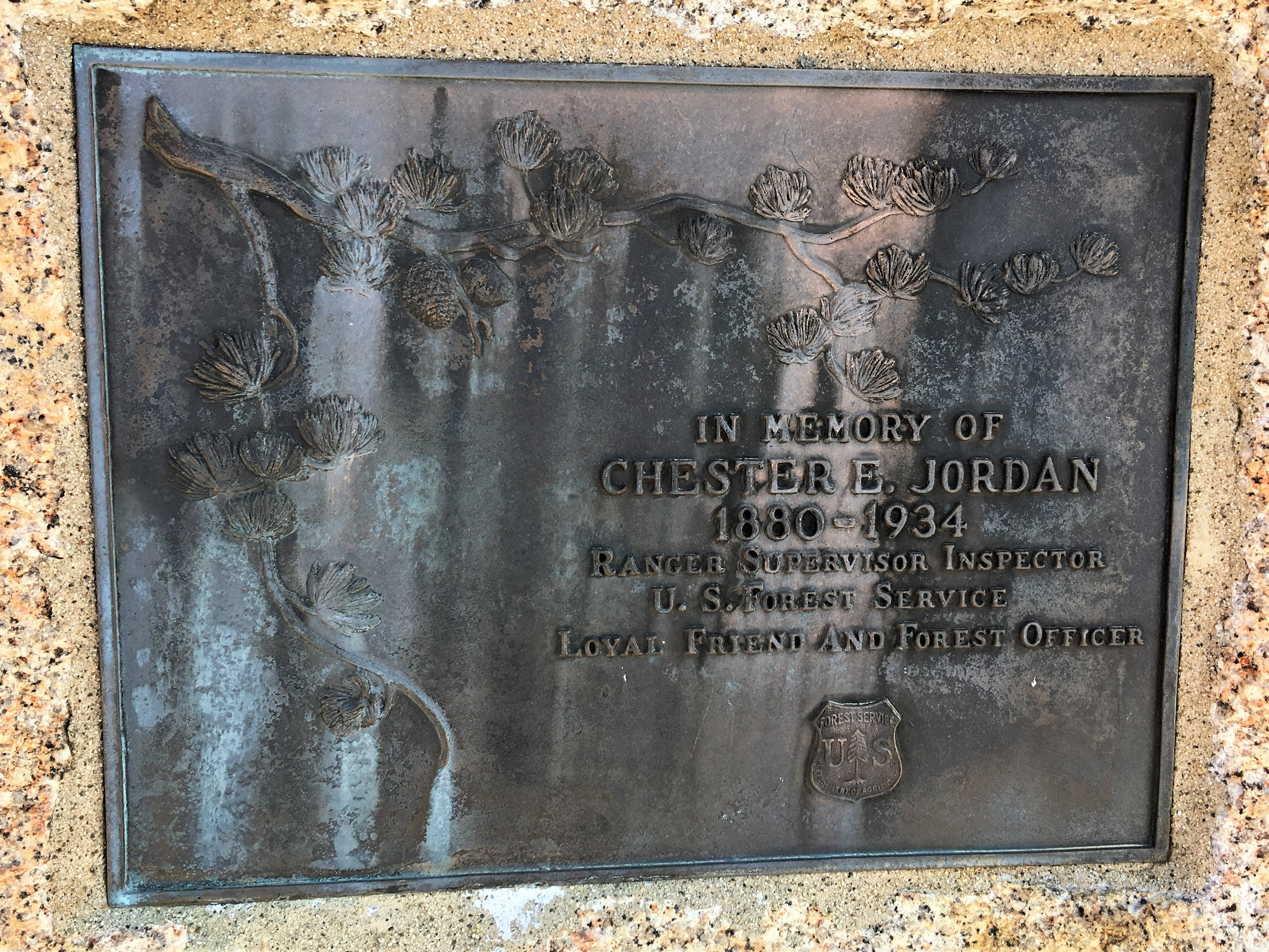
Chester E. Jordan was a Ranger Supervisor Inspector and District Ranger.

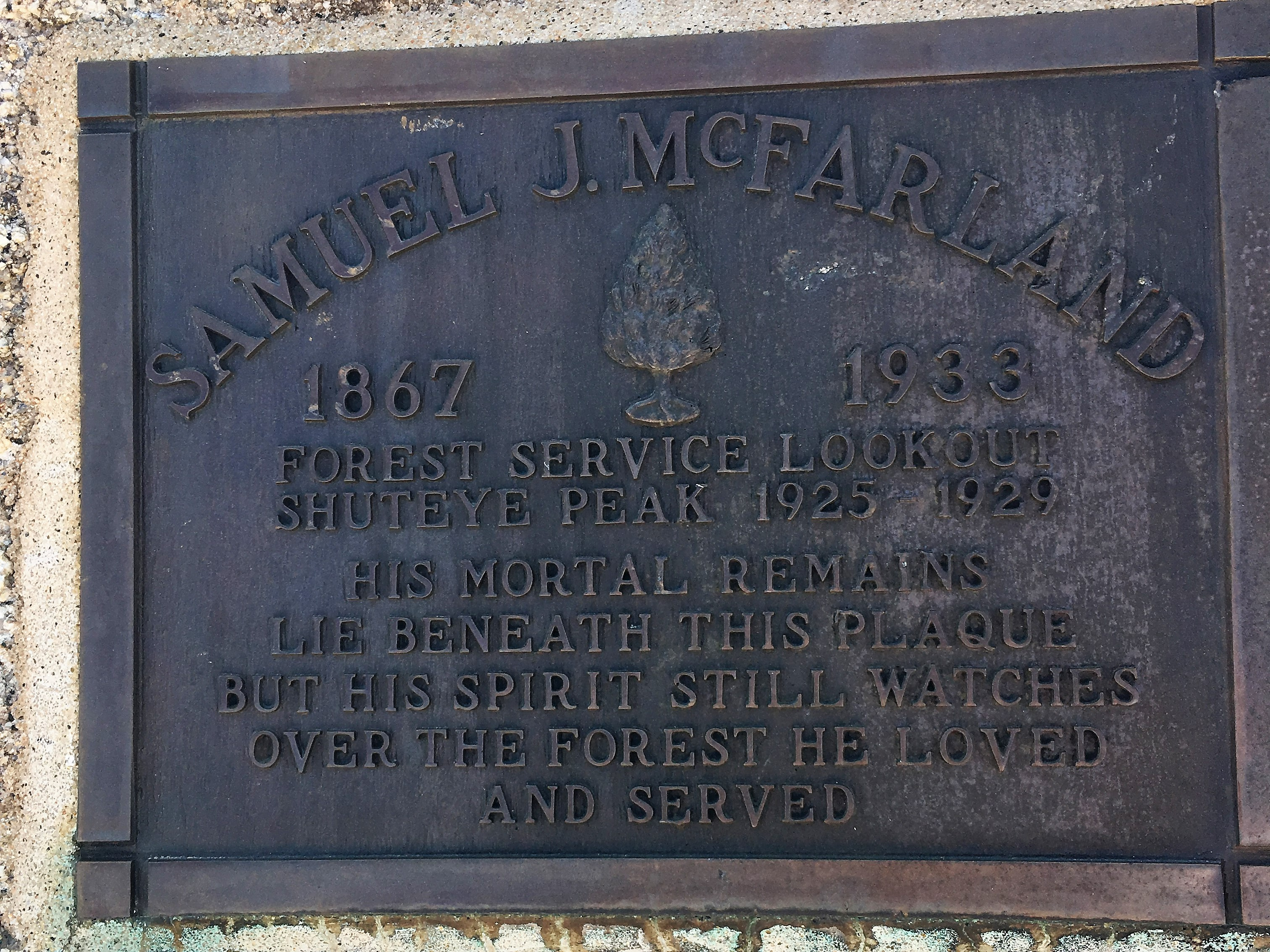
Samuel J. McFarland was the lookout at Shuteye Peak from 1925-1929; his remains are interred below the plaque.

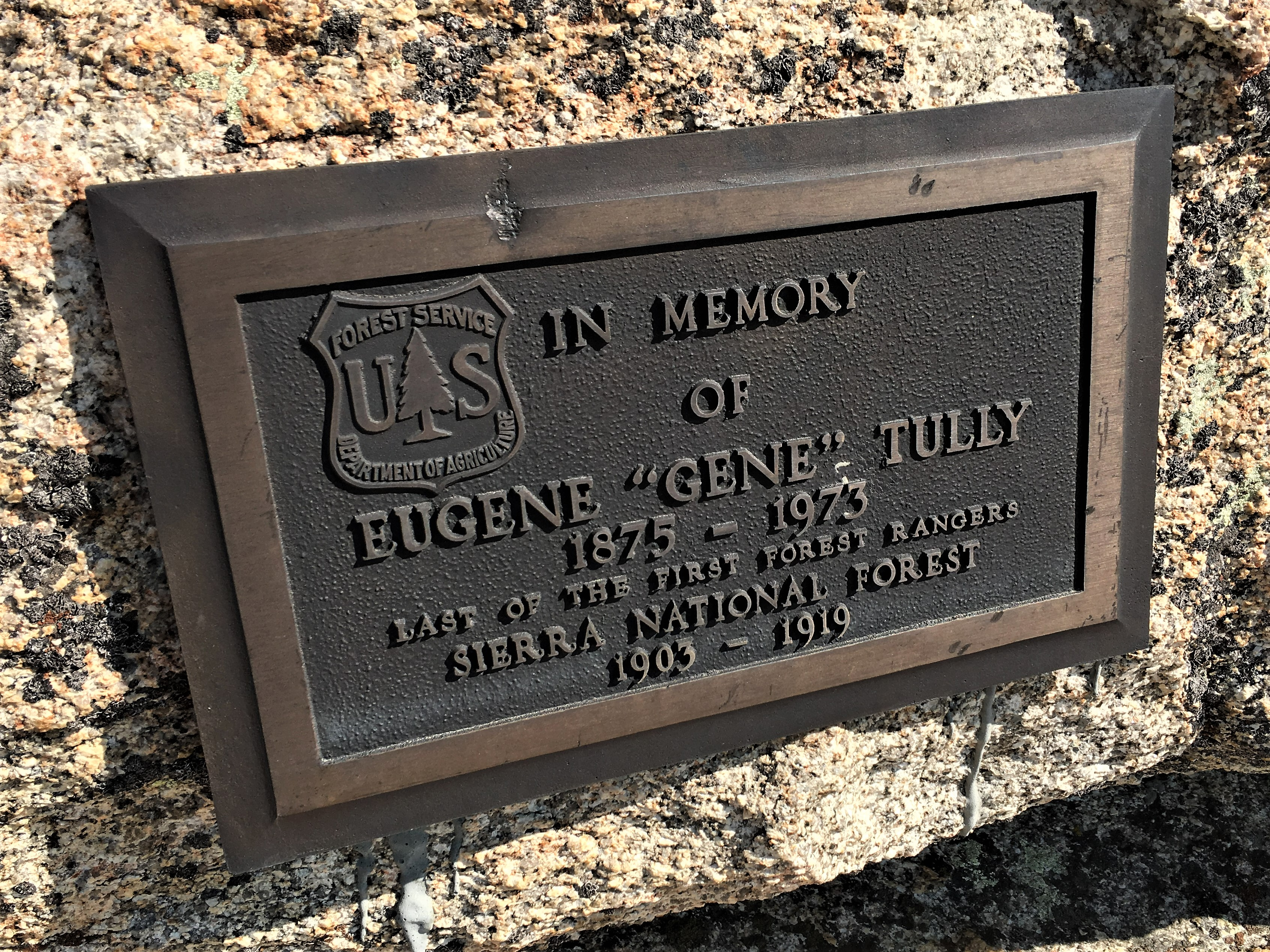
Eugene Tully regulated grazing in the Sierra National Forest in 1903.

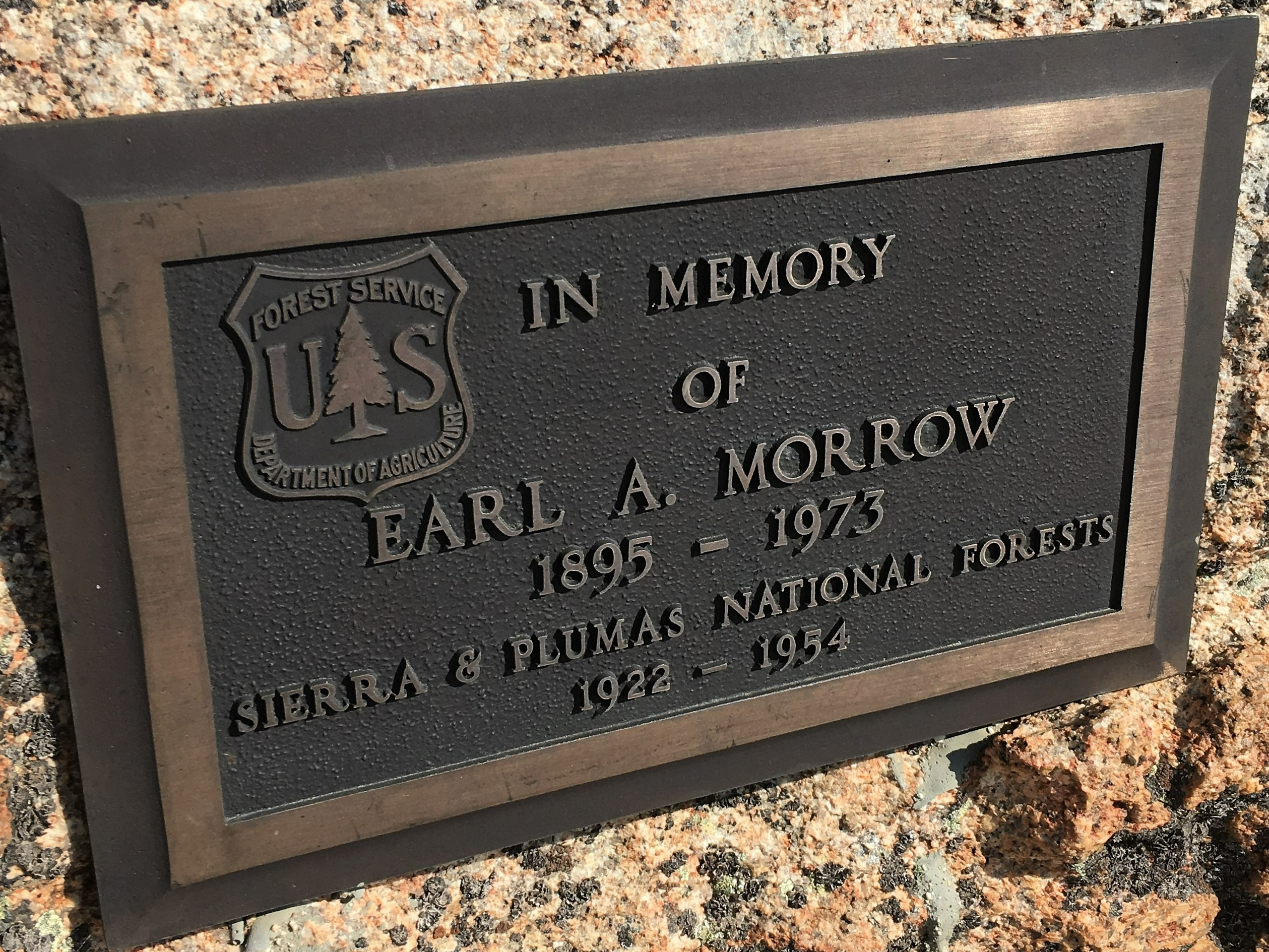
Earl A. Morrow served in the Sierra and Plumas National Forests from 1922-1954.
