= Minarets, California =

Minarets is a former settlement in Madera County, California, United States. It was located 5 miles (8 km) southeast of North Fork.

A post office operated at Minarets from 1925 to 1933. Minarets was the terminus of the Minarets and Western Railroad.

The name Minarets was applied to a geologic feature in the county; see Minarets. The name was applied to a city planned as the county seat for the then newly established Madera County located 15 miles (24 km) east of Madera.
