= Wishon, California =

Unincorporated community in Madera County, California

Wishon
- Unincorporated community
- Miller's Landing marina on Bass Lake in Wishon

- Location in California Wishon (the United States)
- Coordinates: 37°17′58″N 119°33′16″W
- Country: United States
- State: California
- County: Madera
- Established: 1923
- Named for: A. Emory Wishon
- ZIP code: 93669
- Area code: 559

Wishon is an unincorporated community on the south shore of Bass Lake in Madera County, California, United States. Established in 1923, it developed around the junction of two railroads operated by the Sugar Pine Lumber Company. The Minarets and Western Railway connected Wishon with the company's sawmill at Pinedale, while a logging railroad extended from Wishon across Bass Lake Dam to Central Camp.

The community was named for A. Emory Wishon, an executive of the San Joaquin Light and Power Corporation who later became an executive of Pacific Gas and Electric Company.

== History ==
The Sugar Pine Lumber Company was incorporated in 1921 after acquiring timberlands in the central Sierra Nevada. The company initially planned to transport logs by flume but was unable to obtain the necessary water rights from San Joaquin Light and Power. It instead built two standard-gauge railroads between its timber holdings and a new sawmill at Pinedale.

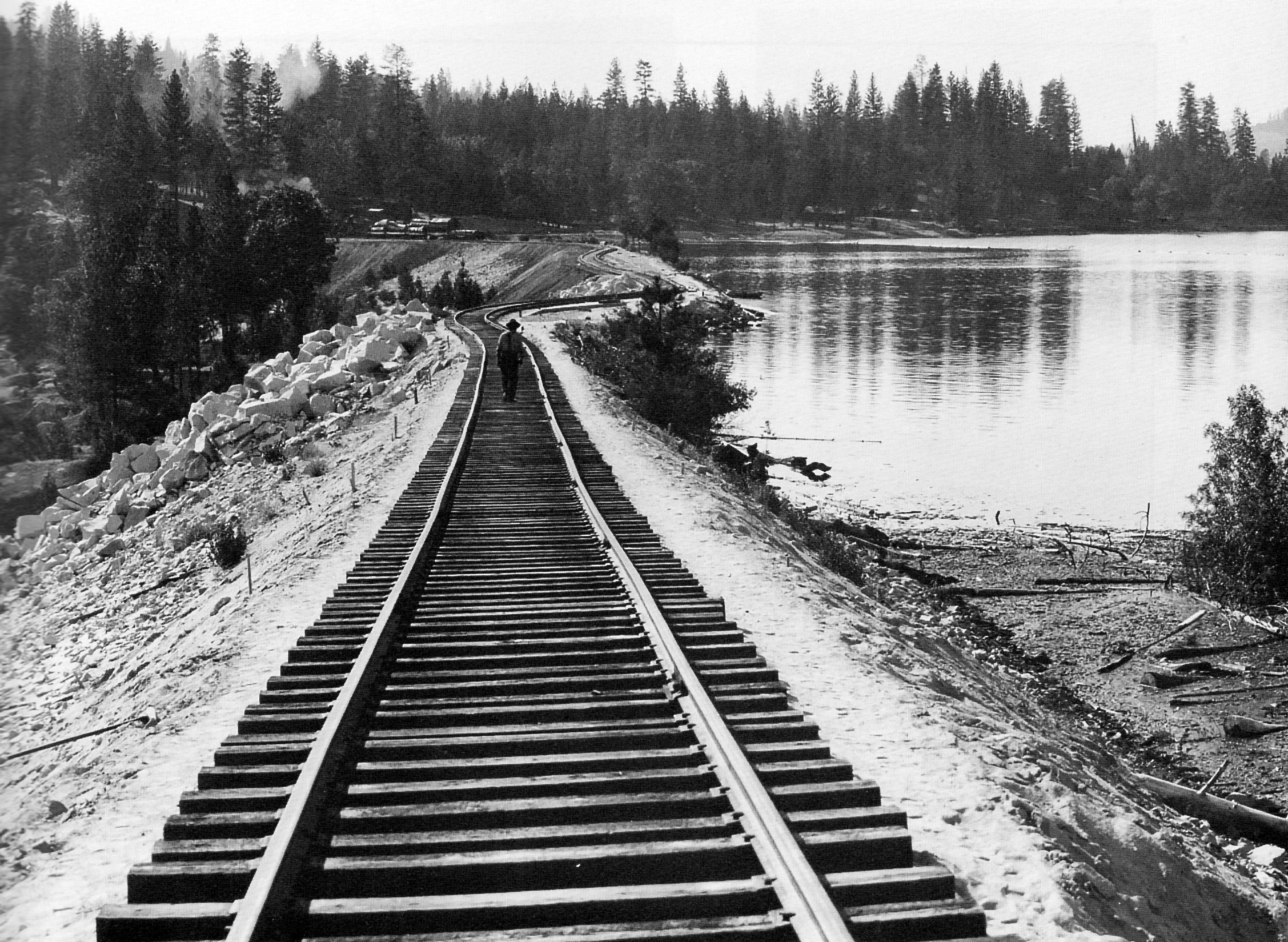
Sugar Pine Lumber Company railroad tracks crossing Bass Lake Dam near Wishon, 1923

Wishon was established near Bass Lake Dam in 1923, when a post office opened there. It served as the interchange between the Minarets and Western Railway and the Sugar Pine Lumber Company's mountain railroad. The Minarets and Western ran from Wishon to Pinedale, while the company's private railroad crossed Bass Lake Dam and climbed 10.82 miles (17.41 km) to Central Camp, the base of its logging operations. Log cars were transferred at Wishon for the trip to the Pinedale mill.

The settlement was named for A. Emory Wishon. He joined San Joaquin Light and Power in 1910, moved to Fresno as an assistant general manager in 1913, and succeeded his father, hydroelectric developer A. G. Wishon, as company president in 1930. When San Joaquin Light and Power merged with Pacific Gas and Electric in 1936, Wishon became a director and assistant general manager of PG&E.

John McDougald opened a store at Wishon in 1928 and served as its first postmaster. By the early 1960s, the business was being advertised as McDougald's Resort. The property later became Miller's Landing, which has been operated by the Miller family since 1982. The Wishon post office remained in operation until 1986.

The Sugar Pine Lumber Company went bankrupt in 1933, and operations on the Minarets and Western were suspended that September. The railroad entered trusteeship in 1934, when the Interstate Commerce Commission authorized abandonment of the line between Wishon and Friant. Scrapping began in 1936, and the last rails north of Friant were removed in 1939. The Wishon post office continued until 1986.
