= Flag of San Diego County, California =

County of San Diego
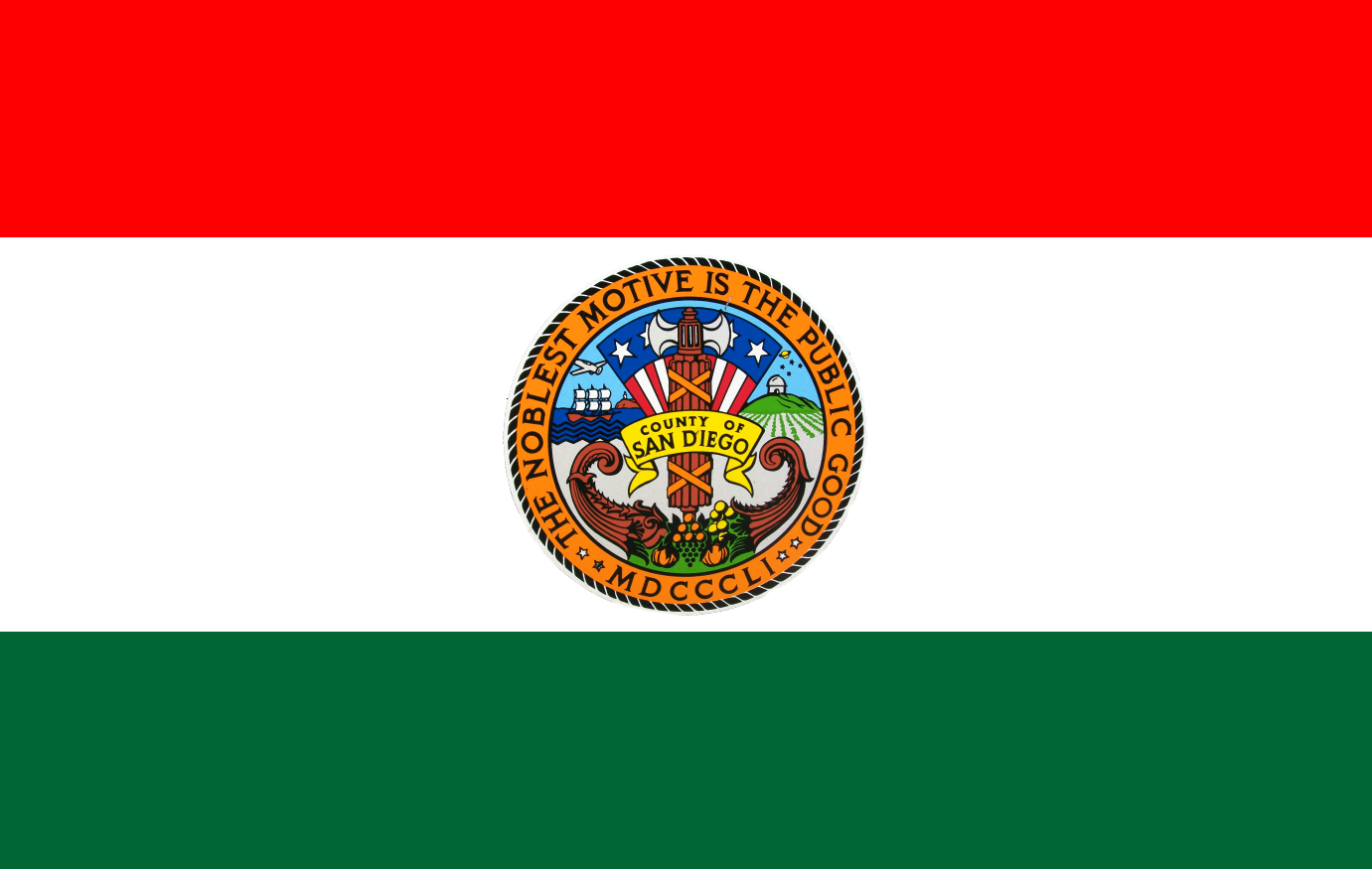
- The County of San Diego Flag
- Use: Civil and state flag
- Adopted: February 18, 1957
- Designed by: Estelle Secor

The flag of San Diego County was adopted in February 1957, although an actual specimen would not be created until September 1957. It features the San Diego County seal adopted in 1937, centered on a horizontal tricolor of red, white, and green.

== History ==
In 1956, a committee consisting of John Davidson, County Purchasing Agent Verne Gehringer, and Director of Parks and Recreation Cletus Gardner, conducted a study for a design for an official flag for San Diego County. Gardner wrote in a memo to the Board on February 14, 1957 that "One of the original reasons for this [sic] designing was to have an official County flag hanging in the Board Chambers."

The board formally adopted a drawing of the flag on February 18, 1957. The County flag was designed by Estelle Secor, a former County employee in the Road Department. Secor presented a completed, hand-sewn flag based on the design to the Board of Supervisors on September 10, 1957.

In 1962, the board directed that the hand-fabricated official flag of the county, by Secor, be thoroughly cleaned and permanently enclosed in a glass case in the Board Chamber. That flag is still on display in the Board Chamber at Room 310 at the County Administration Center, 1600 Pacific Highway in San Diego, California. The U.S. flag, Californian state flag, and County flag are all displayed at most County facilities.

On February 18, 1957, the San Diego County Board of Supervisors adopted an official flag for the county, depicting the county's seal on a field of white, bordered at the top by a band of red, and at the bottom by a band of green, representing how San Diego County was under the control of King Charles of Spain, Mexico, the Republic of California, and the United States.

=== Design ===
She's the Betsy Ross of San Diego County (2016) (3:27)
2016 documentary about the flag's creation, including an interview with the designer.

The colors red, white, and green on the flag symbolize the city's Spanish and Mexican past, as the colors are featured on their respective flags.

The seal depicted on the flag was designed by architect Samuel W. Hamill and was adopted in 1937, replacing a previous seal that had been in use since 1933. It depicts:

a double-headed axe rising from a bundle of sticks, which served as a symbol of authority in ancient Rome. Also included in the seal are the stars and stripes of the United States, a stylized dolphin representing the fruits of the sea, and a horn of plenty representing the fruits of the land. A clipper ship recalls San Diego's historic background of the sea, and the airplane looks into the future. Mt. Palomar Observatory represents a world renowned achievement in science and San Diego's position on the threshold of scientific history. The observatory overlooks an orange grove, which reflects the agricultural riches of the county. Encircling the seal is the motto "The Noblest Motive is the Public Good"--a quotation from Virgil that was chosen by the Building Committee as the motto to adorn the Civic Center Building. At the bottom is the date 1851, which is the date the county was founded.

There was some confusion over the seal. Many citizens:

did not understand what it was meant to represent. One citizen commented "this emblem which is to adorn the Civic Center... represents nothing in the Heavens above, nor the Earth beneath, but is an object of mirth to you men. Still since it is to cost the tax payers 1,000 bucks it is nothing to make merry over." [ W.J. Dougherety. Letter to the Board of Supervisors of San Diego County. February 20, 1938. Records of the Board of Supervisors of San Diego County.] Despite such complaints, the seal was officially adopted by the Board of Supervisors in 1937, replacing an earlier seal that had been chosen in 1933. It adorned the northern entrance to the Civic Center until the city moved out in 1964, when it was also placed over the southern entrance."

== See also ==
- Flag of San Diego
