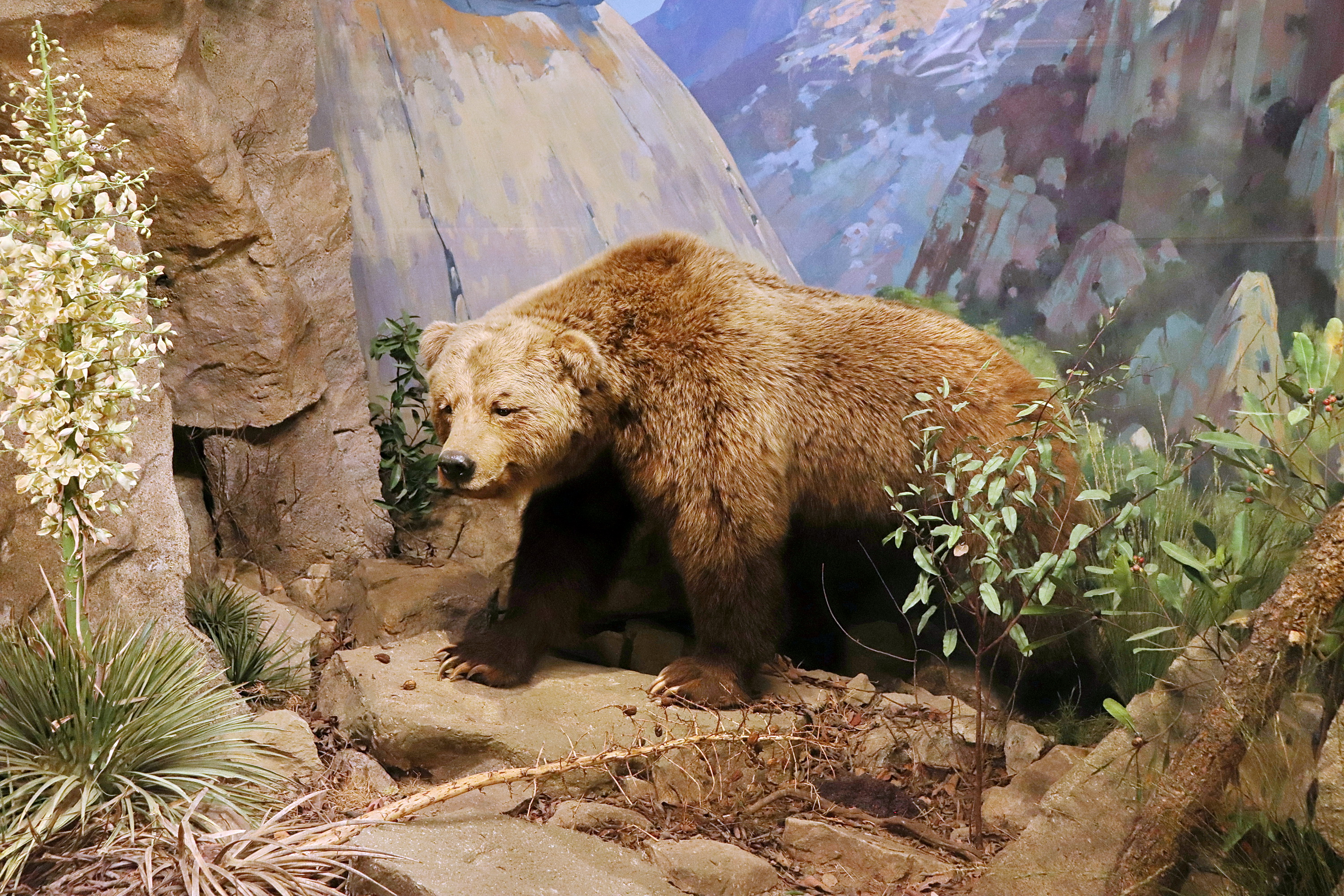
- Specimen at the Santa Barbara Museum of Natural History

Conservation status
- Extinct (1924) (IUCN 3.1)

Scientific classification
- Kingdom: Animalia
- Phylum: Chordata
- Class: Mammalia
- Order: Carnivora
- Family: Ursidae
- Genus: Ursus
- Species: U. arctos
- Subspecies: †U. a. californicus

Trionomial name
- †Ursus arctos californicus (Merriam, 1896)

Synonyms
- List: Ursus californicus (Merriam, 1896); Ursus horribilis californicus Merriam, 1896; Ursus colusus Merriam, 1914; Ursus henshawi Merriam, 1914; Ursus klamathensis Merriam, 1914; Ursus magister Merriam, 1914; Ursus mendocinensis Merriam, 1916; Ursus tularensis Merriam, 1914

= California grizzly bear =

California grizzly bear Temporal range: Holocene

Extinct population of the brown bear

The California grizzly bear (Ursus arctos californicus), also known as the California brown bear, California golden bear, or chaparral bear, is an extinct population of the brown bear, generally known (together with other North American brown bear populations) as the grizzly bear.

"Grizzly" could have meant "grizzled" – that is, with golden and grey tips of the hair – or "fear-inspiring" (as a phonetic spelling of "grisly"). Nonetheless, after careful study, naturalist George Ord formally classified it in 1815 – not for its hair, but for its character – as Ursus horribilis ("terrifying bear").

Genetically, North American brown bears are closely related; in size and coloring, the California grizzly bear was much like the Kodiak bear of the southern coast of Alaska.

The grizzly became a symbol of the Bear Flag Republic, a moniker that was attached to the short-lived attempt by a group of U.S. settlers to break away from Mexico in 1846. Later, this rebel flag became the basis for the state flag of California.

== Taxonomy and evolution ==
A 1953 researcher stated, "The specific status of North American brown bears (or grizzly bears) is one of the most complex problems of mammalian taxonomy. The difficulty stems directly from the work of Merriam (1918), who concluded that there are 86 forms of grizzlies (and brown bears) in North America."

North American brown bears were taxonomically grouped as a species apart from other bear species, until DNA testing revealed that they should properly be grouped in the same species as the other brown bears. Grizzlies living in California had been classified by Merriam into many subspecies. Over time, these were all synonymized into a single subspecies, Ursus arctos californicus. A study based on mitochondrial DNA suggests that the only genetically anomalous grouping of grizzly bears is the ABC Islands bear, implying that previous grizzly bear subspecies designations are unwarranted. However, a formal taxonomic synonymy was not performed, and mitochondrial introgression is known to be an issue in brown bears. Pending further taxonomic resolution, the subspecies is provisionally accepted as separate.

A recent genomic study recovered the California grizzly within a clade of grizzly bears present in the contiguous United States. The grizzly bear population present in Yellowstone National Park was identified as most closely related to the California grizzly, and that the California population diverged approximately 10,000 years ago. The oldest fossil remains of grizzly bears in California were recovered from the La Brea Tar Pits. This fossil specimen, weighing ~455 kilograms (1,003 lb), is dated to the Greenlandian stage, over 7,500 years ago.

== Appearance ==
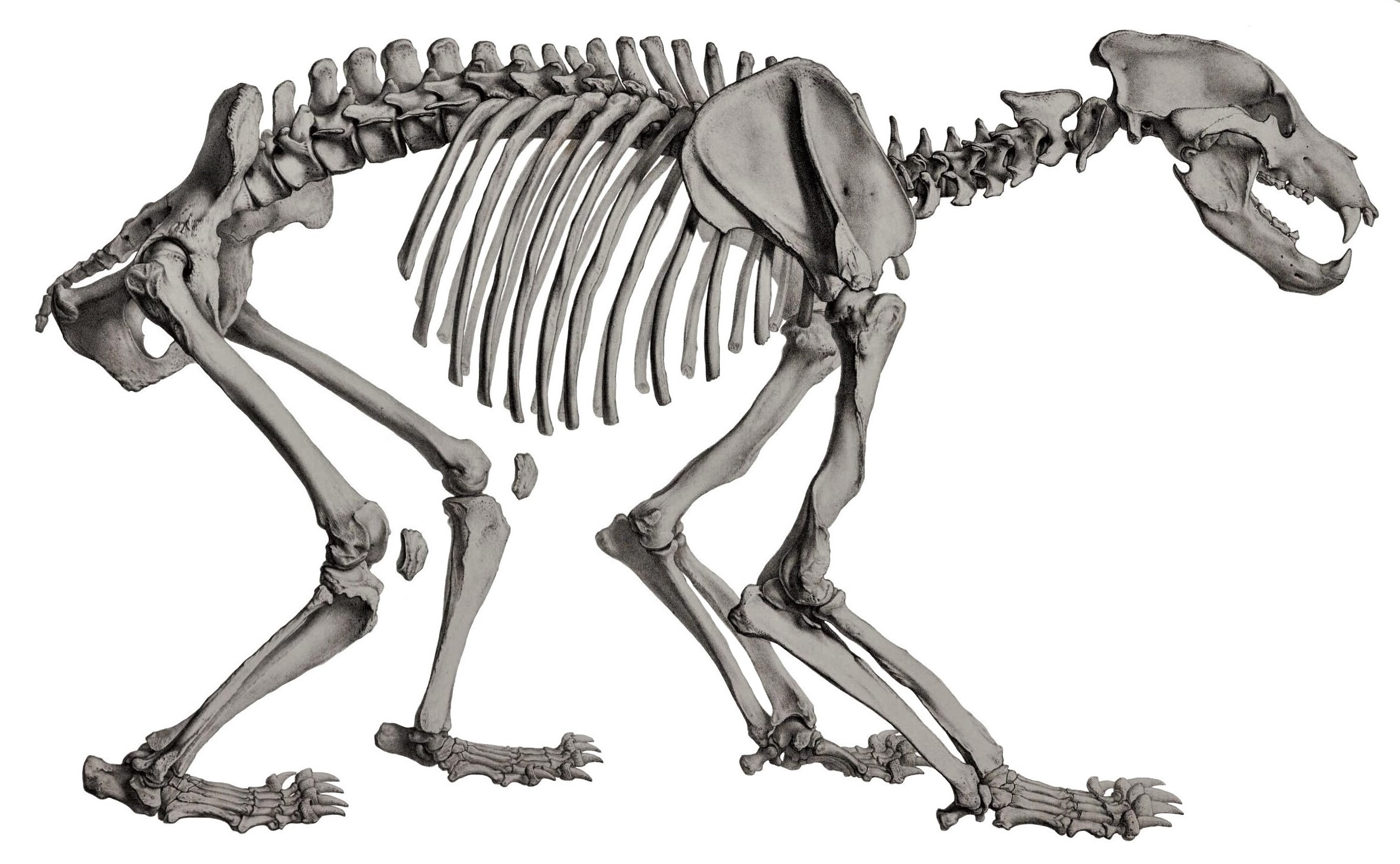
Illustration of a California grizzly bear skeleton

The California grizzly was historically considered an enormous bear. Father Pedro Font, an early missionary, described the local grizzly bears, writing, "He was horrible, fierce, large, and fat." In the 1800s, multiple newspaper accounts mentioned bears weighing well over 1,000 pounds (450 kg); the hind foot of one particular adult male grizzly was measured at 12 inches (300 mm) long by 8 inches (200 mm) wide, and claws were often 2 inches (51 mm) wide by 3.5 inches (89 mm) long. Measurements of museum specimens, however, demonstrate that this bear was no larger than those present in the rest of North America, with average body size estimates ranging from 104 kilograms (229 lb) to 252 kilograms (556 lb) depending on methodology.

The fur of the California grizzly bear has been described as golden brown, leading to the occasional name "California golden bear". The captive individual "Monarch" had a dark brown, almost black, pelt.

== Diet and behavior ==
The diet of the California grizzly bear was diverse, ranging from plant sources like grasses, seeds, berries, and acorns, to animal sources such as elk, deer, salmon, steelhead, and carrion. Isotopic study indicates that the majority of the diet consisted of plant matter, as with other grizzly bear populations. Anecdotal reports from Spanish explorers reported California grizzly bears scavenging on beached whale carcasses. After the introduction of European livestock, California grizzly bears increasingly incorporated cattle into their diets. California grizzly bears were primarily solitary, except for mothers with cubs, but foraging groups of up to 40 have been reported.

== Distribution and habitat ==
Prior to Spanish settlement in the second half of the 1700s, it is estimated that 10,000 grizzly bears inhabited what is modern-day California. It is thought that the bears lived across almost the entirety of the state, save its most southeastern and northeastern corners. Probably the southernmost records for this subspecies are from the Sierra de Juárez, during the 18th century. The bear was most abundant in chaparral, oak woodland, and hardwood forests.

== Relationship with humans ==
=== European contact ===
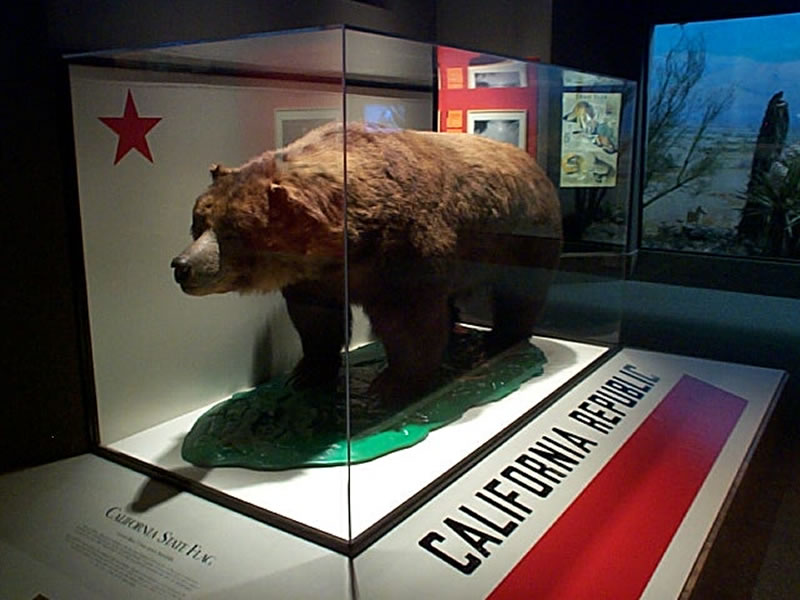
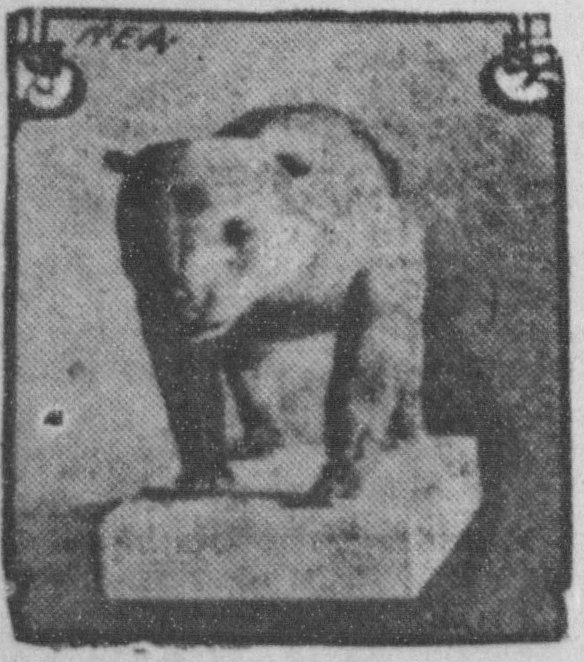
Monarch (above), a specimen preserved at the California Academy of Sciences, and a taxidermy of one of his two short-lived cubs (below)

The first documented sighting of a grizzly bear in California occurred in 1603 when a Spanish explorer near Monterey described how bears came down to feed on a whale carcass stranded on the beach. However, his reports were not widely circulated, so the existence of grizzlies in California was not well-known to Europeans until the eighteenth century.

Western Europeans' first well-circulated encounters with California grizzly bears are found in diaries kept by several members of the 1769 Portola expedition, the first European land exploration of what is now the state of California. Several place names that include the Spanish word for bear (oso) trace their origins back to that first overland expedition (e.g. Los Osos). As the settled frontier of New Spain was extended northward, settlers began to populate California and establish large cattle herds as the main industry. The ranchers' livestock were easy prey for the largely herbivorous-omnivorous grizzly bears found across the state. In turn, grizzly populations increased around human settlements. By eating their livelihood, and scaring them, the grizzlies became enemies of the rancheros. Vaqueros hunted the grizzlies, often roping and capturing them alive to be pitted against other animals in public battles (bloodsports).

In 1866, a grizzly bear described as weighing as much as 2,200 pounds (1,000 kg) was killed in what is present-day Valley Center, California, in the north-central area of San Diego County. The incident was recalled in 1932 by Catherine E. Lovett Smith, who witnessed the bear's killing on her family's ranch when she was just six years old. If its measurements are accurate, this particular bear was the biggest bear ever found in California and one of the largest specimens of any bear species ever recorded. (Other sources confirm Lovett Smith's account of the bear, but differ as to its exact size.) Her telling of that bear is part of the oral history of "Bear Valley", the original name for Valley Center. The bear was prominent in the Big Sur region of the central California coast. Frank Post, born in 1859 on the Soberanes Ranch in Big Sur, remembered when his family lived at Soberanes Creek, during the American Civil War – recalling the "Great Sur Bears". Inhabiting most of the state, both inland and along the coast, it is likely the California grizzly's southernmost range in the state overlapped with that of the now-extinct Mexican grizzly bear, as well.

=== Extinction ===
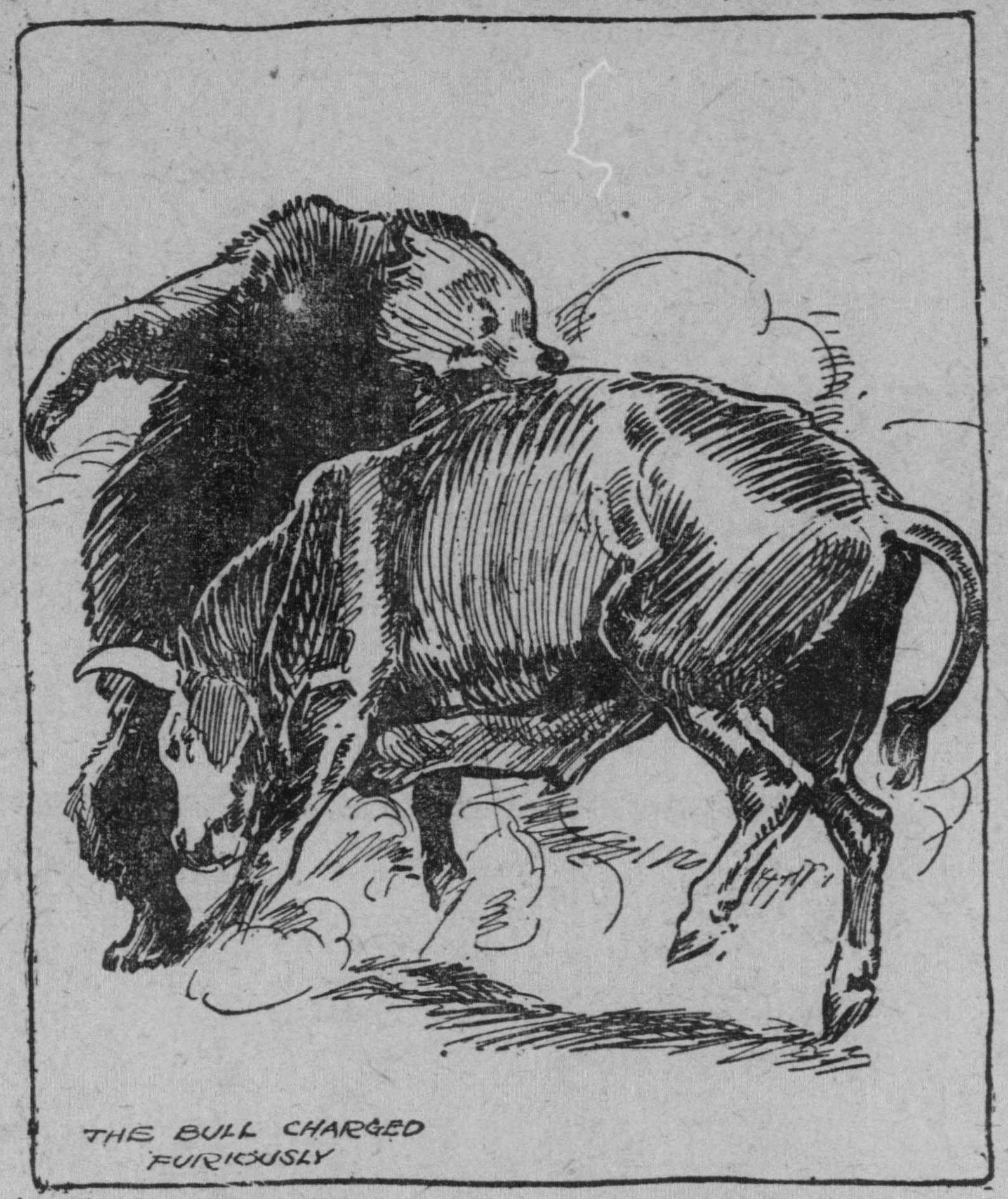
An illustration of a bear bullfight by HM Stoops. Published in The San Francisco Call on January 15, 1911.

In the late 1700s, Spanish ranchers placed a poisoned "bait ball" made of suet or swine entrails filled with a lethal dose of strychnine which they hung from the branches of a tree within reach of the bear but out of reach of dogs and children. Mexican settlers captured bears for bear and bull fights and they also sold their skins for 6 to 10 pesos to trading ships. Bear Trap Canyon near Bixby Creek was one of their favorite sites for trapping grizzly bears along the central California coast. These bears were even turned into furniture, such as a chair gifted to President Andrew Johnson in 1865.

Bear-baiting events flourished as popular spectacles in 19th century California. Bloody fights that pitted bears against bulls often inspired betting as to whether the bear or the bull would win. One persistently popular, but false phrase origin story related to these fights stems from famous 19th-century newspaperman Horace Greeley. While visiting California, Greeley allegedly witnessed such a fight, and supposedly gave the modern stock market its "bear" and "bull" nicknames, respectively representing a declining and a growing market, based on the fighting styles of the two animals: the bear swipes downward while the bull hooks upward. In truth, the phrase's origins predate Greeley's 1859 journey to California by at least 100 years, but the myth of the California connection persists.

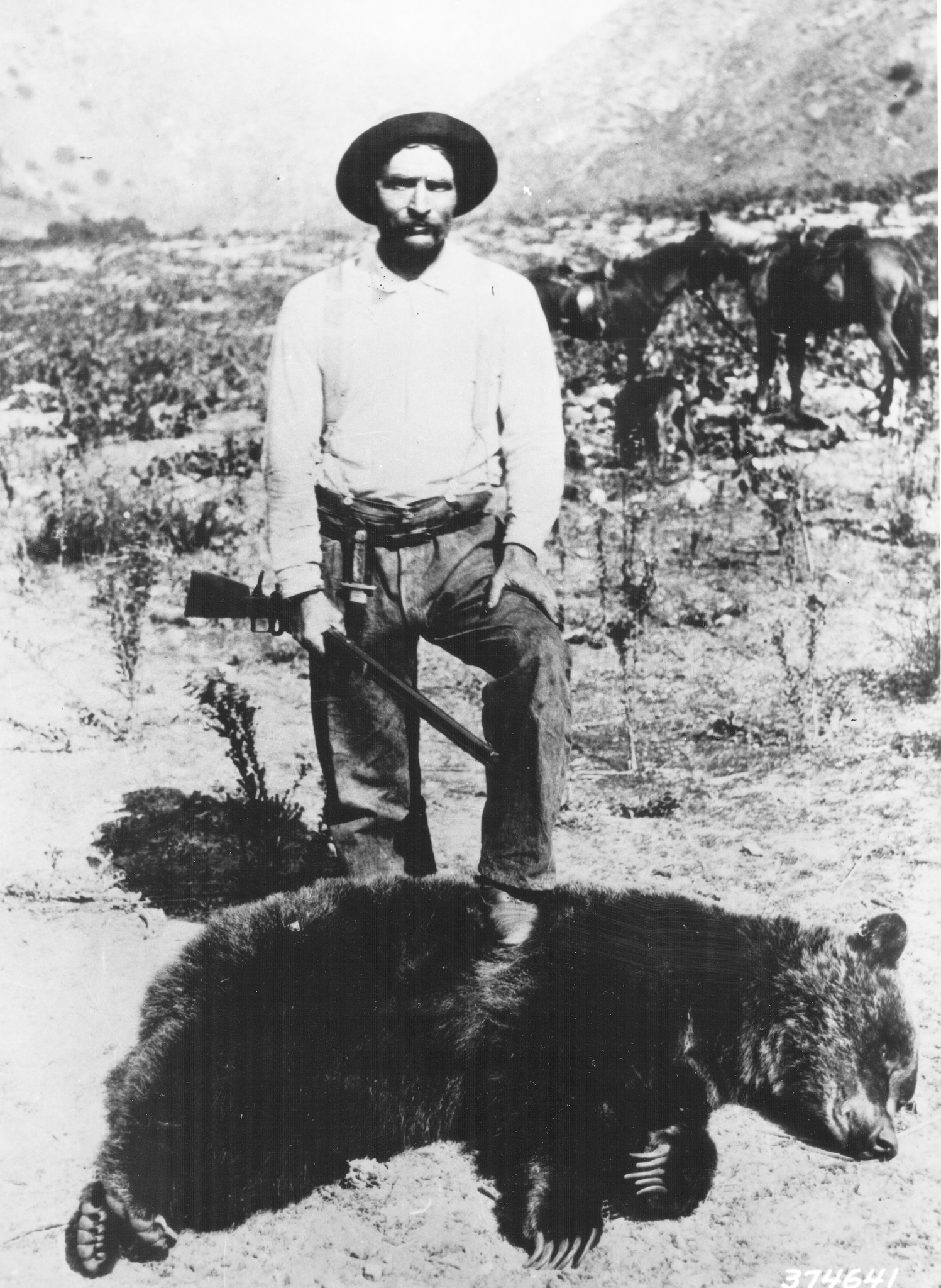
Specimen shot in 1916

The Monterey County Herald noted on July 4, 1874:

Last Monday, Captain A. Smith, who resides about ten miles from town, in the Carmel Valley, succeeded in poisoning a large grizzly bear. Bruin had been annoying the neighborhood by destroying cattle, etc., for several years past, and all efforts to exterminate him seem futile. In some manner, however, he was induced partake of that "cold pizen" the captain had prepared for his special benefit. He is not likely to repeat his experiment.

In the early to mid 19th century, livestock from the ranchos of California provided an abundant food source for the bears, allowing the grizzly population to expand rapidly. However, the cattle population was greatly diminished following extreme drought and flooding in the 1860s and 1870s, leading to a reduction in the number of grizzlies. This coincided with an increased interest in bear hunting, both for sport and commercial purposes. Grizzly bear meat became a mainstay on restaurant menus in the San Gabriel area; according to Mike Davis, “The paws from adult bears and the flesh from young cubs were deemed particular delicacies.”

European settlers paid bounties on the bears who regularly preyed on livestock until the early 20th century. Absolom (Rocky) Beasley hunted grizzly bears throughout the Santa Lucia Mountains and claimed to have killed 139 bears in his lifetime. Noted California mountain man Seth Kinman claimed to have shot over 800 grizzly bears in a 20-year period in the areas surrounding present day Humboldt County. One prospector in Southern California, William F. Holcomb (nicknamed "Grizzly Bill" Holcomb), was particularly well known for hunting grizzly bears in what is now San Bernardino County.

During September 1897, in the mountains between Inwood and Mt. Lassen, Shasta County, 21-year-old Elias Weigart and his dog encountered a huge California grizzly whose front track measured 11 inches (28 cm) and the rear, 19 inches (48 cm). The bear died after Weigart emptied his Winchester 38-55 into the animal at close range.

In 1920, the Shuteye Peak area of Madera County was home to one of the last California grizzlies, nicknamed 'Two Toes', who lost part of his front foot in a trap and evaded hunters for years.

The last hunted California grizzly bear was shot in Tulare County, California, in August 1922, although no body, skeleton or pelt was ever produced. Less than 75 years after the discovery of gold in 1848, almost every grizzly bear in California had been tracked down and killed. In 1924, what was thought to be a grizzly was spotted in Sequoia National Park for the last time and thereafter, grizzlies were never seen again in California.

=== Reintroduction ===
Support to reintroduce grizzlies to the state is growing. Despite having one of the largest American black bear populations in the nation, California still has habitat that can sustain about 500 grizzlies; it is thought that the presence of an additional large mammal could curb overpopulation of the smaller black bear, which often is involved in human-bear conflicts, as it enters human settlements in pursuit of food and trash. In 2014, the U.S. Fish and Wildlife Service received, and subsequently rejected, a petition to reintroduce grizzly bears to California. In 2015, the Center for Biological Diversity launched a petition aimed at the California state legislature to reintroduce the grizzly bear to the state.

In anticipation of the 2024 centennial marking the final recorded sighting of a wild grizzly bear in California, a collaborative effort was initiated by scientists affiliated with the Research Network, prominent leaders from California Tribes, and advocates associated with conservation nonprofits. This initiative resulted in the establishment of the California Grizzly Alliance.

Despite these efforts, however, their reintroduction remains controversial. Arguments against grizzly bear reintroduction emphasize the potential for rare but significant harm, such as attacks causing injuries or fatalities. Those who deem any harm, especially loss of human life, as morally unacceptable view the reintroduction in California as an intolerable threat, regardless of individual risk.

=== Symbolism ===
The California grizzly bear is featured on the flag of California.

The California grizzly bear is one of the state's most visible and enduring symbols, adorning both the state flag and seal. The Bear Flag first flew in 1846 as a symbol of the short-lived California Republic. A second version was adopted as the state flag by the state legislature in 1911. The bear symbol became a permanent part of the state seal in 1849. The California grizzly bear was designated the official state animal in 1953. The bear is celebrated in name and as mascot of the sports teams of the University of California, Berkeley (the California Golden Bears), and of the University of California, Los Angeles (the UCLA Bruins) and in the mascot of University of California, Riverside (the UC Riverside Highlanders). The Cal Poly Maritime Academy operates a training ship named Golden Bear.

The name "Yosemite" likely originates from the indigenous Ahwahneechee word for grizzly bear, "Oo-soo-mah-ty" or "Yo-hem-ah-ty", which directly refers to the animal. James M. Hutchings, a pioneer in promoting Yosemite tourism, named the monumental sequoia Grizzly Giant. He chose the name to evoke the formidable presence, massive stature, and rugged independence of the California grizzly bear.
