= Central Camp, California =

Unincorporated community in California, United States

Central Camp
- Unincorporated community
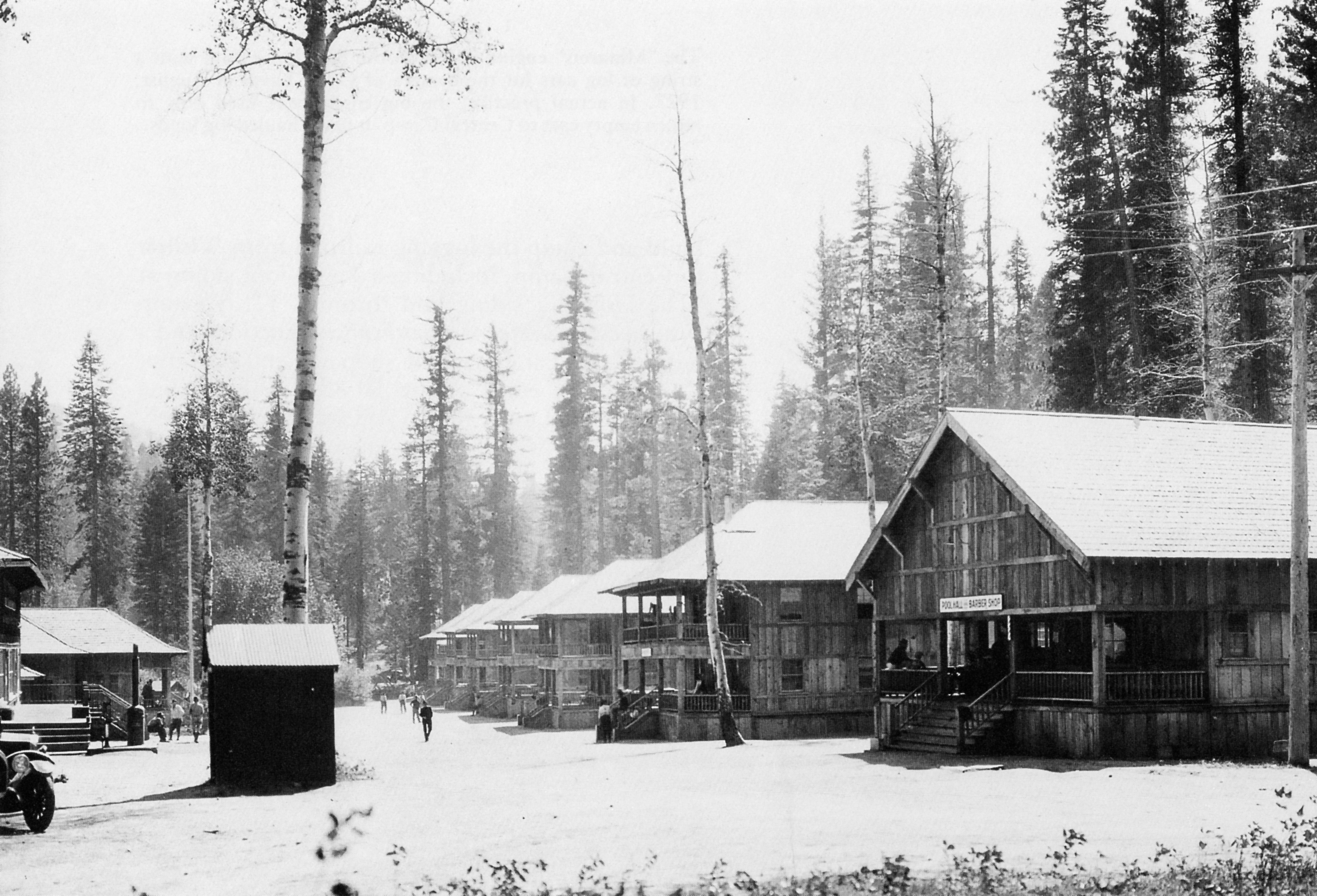
- Main Street, circa late 1920s

- Location in California Central Camp (the United States)
- Coordinates: 37°20′58″N 119°29′01″W
- Country: United States
- State: California
- County: Madera
- Elevation: 5,417 ft (1,651 m)

Central Camp is an unincorporated community in Madera County, California, United States. It is located 3 miles (4.8 km) west of Shuteye Peak, at an elevation of 5,417 feet (1,651 m).

From 1923 until the early 1930s, Central Camp served as the mountain base of the Sugar Pine Lumber Company, one of the largest lumber operations in California at the time. After the company's logging operations ended, the settlement developed into a seasonal cabin community. A subdivision was established there in 1962, with water, sewer, and electrical service.

== History ==
The Sugar Pine Lumber Company established Central Camp in 1923 as the base for its logging operations in the mountains east of Bass Lake. The camp was connected to the company's railroad system by the Sugar Pine Railroad, which climbed from the interchange at Wishon to Central Camp and extended through logging spurs into the surrounding timberlands.

Central Camp housed about 500 people, including loggers and their families, railroad and construction workers, and camp employees. Built at a reported cost of $600,000, the settlement included dormitories and family housing, a hospital, school, commissary, cookhouse, post office, recreation facilities, and railroad repair shops. Electricity was supplied from the hydroelectric system at Bass Lake, while a central boiler provided steam heat to the living quarters. Food and other supplies were brought into the camp by rail, including fresh produce carried in refrigerator cars. Although Central Camp operated during Prohibition and had no saloon, whiskey was occasionally bootlegged into the camp.

As the company's timber supply declined and the lumber market weakened, Central Camp was also used for public excursions. By 1931, visitors traveled by train from the San Joaquin Valley to the camp for programs that included logging demonstrations, entertainment, and overnight stays. That year, RKO Pictures used the company's mountain facilities and railroad equipment during location filming for Carnival Boat (1932), starring William Boyd and Ginger Rogers.

The Sugar Pine Lumber Company entered bankruptcy in 1933, and operations on its railroad system were suspended later that year. The railroad tracks were subsequently removed and many of Central Camp's large company buildings were dismantled. Portions of the former camp eventually passed into private ownership, and the community developed into a seasonal cabin settlement.

By 1962, lots in a Central Camp subdivision were being marketed with water, sewer, and electrical service. In 1968, developers announced plans for a six-hole public golf course as part of efforts to attract visitors to the community.

During the Creek Fire in September 2020, Central Camp was placed under mandatory evacuation. Fire crews constructed containment lines around the community and conducted structure-protection operations nearby.

== Gallery ==
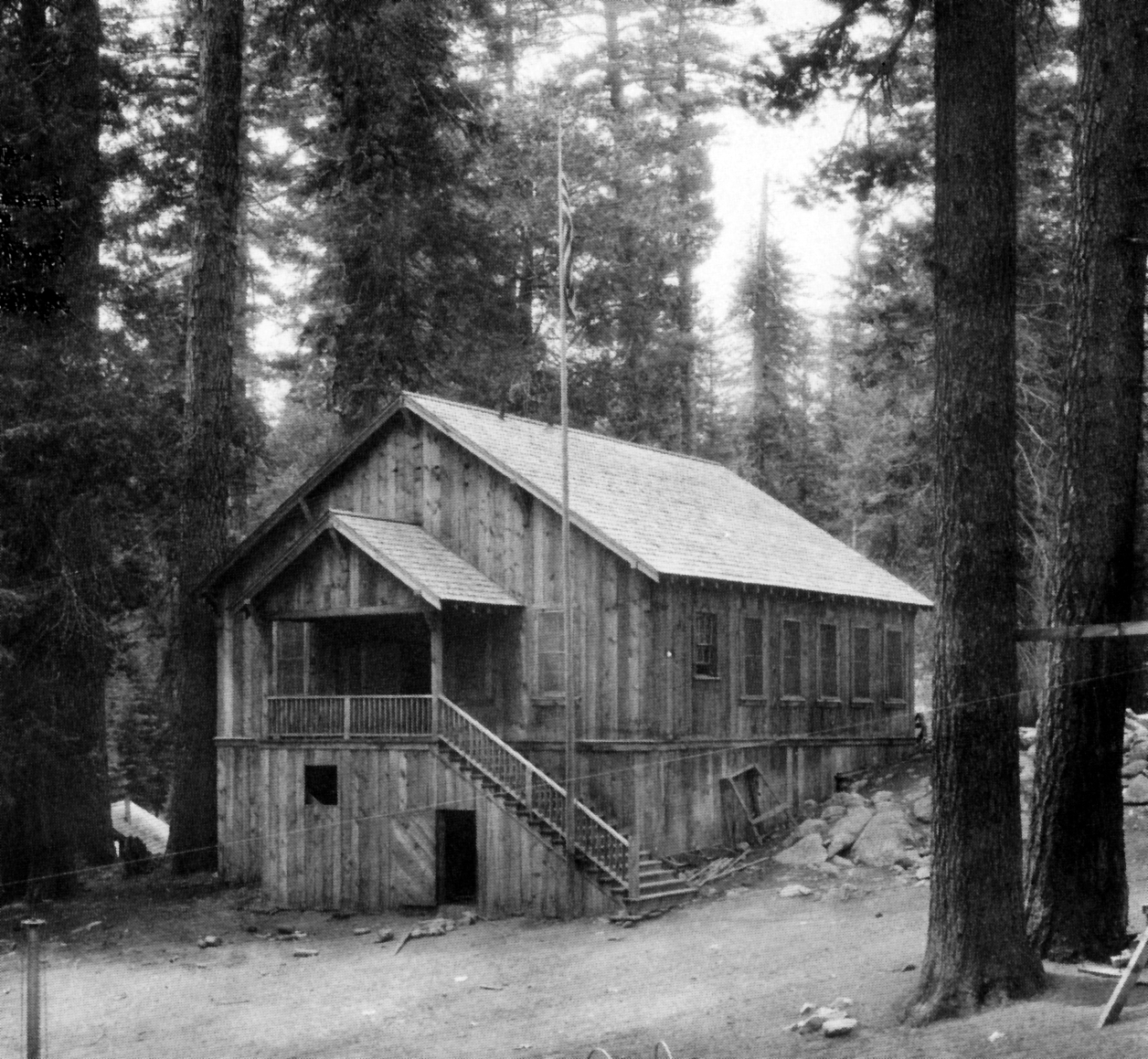
Central Camp school

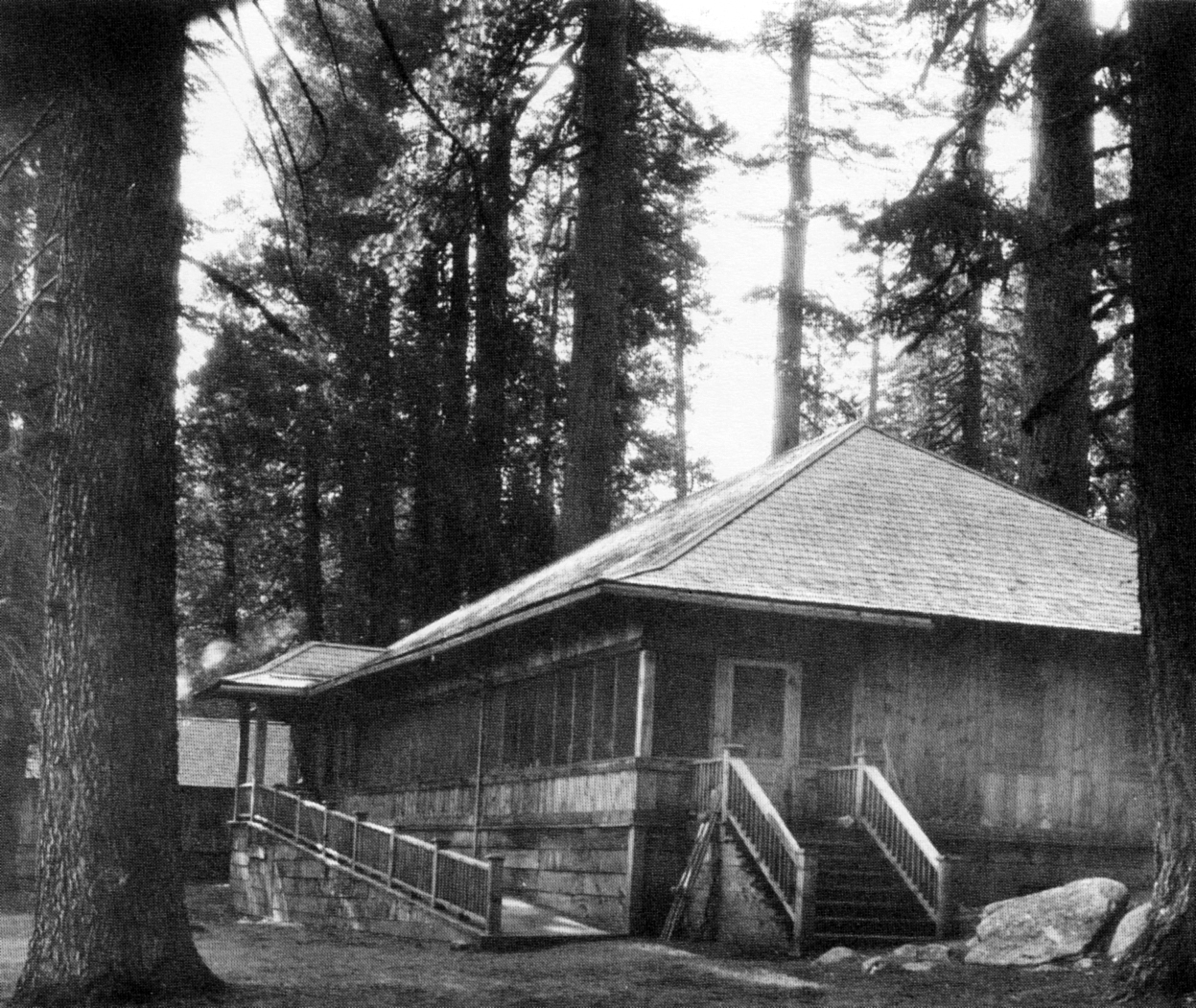
Central Camp hospital

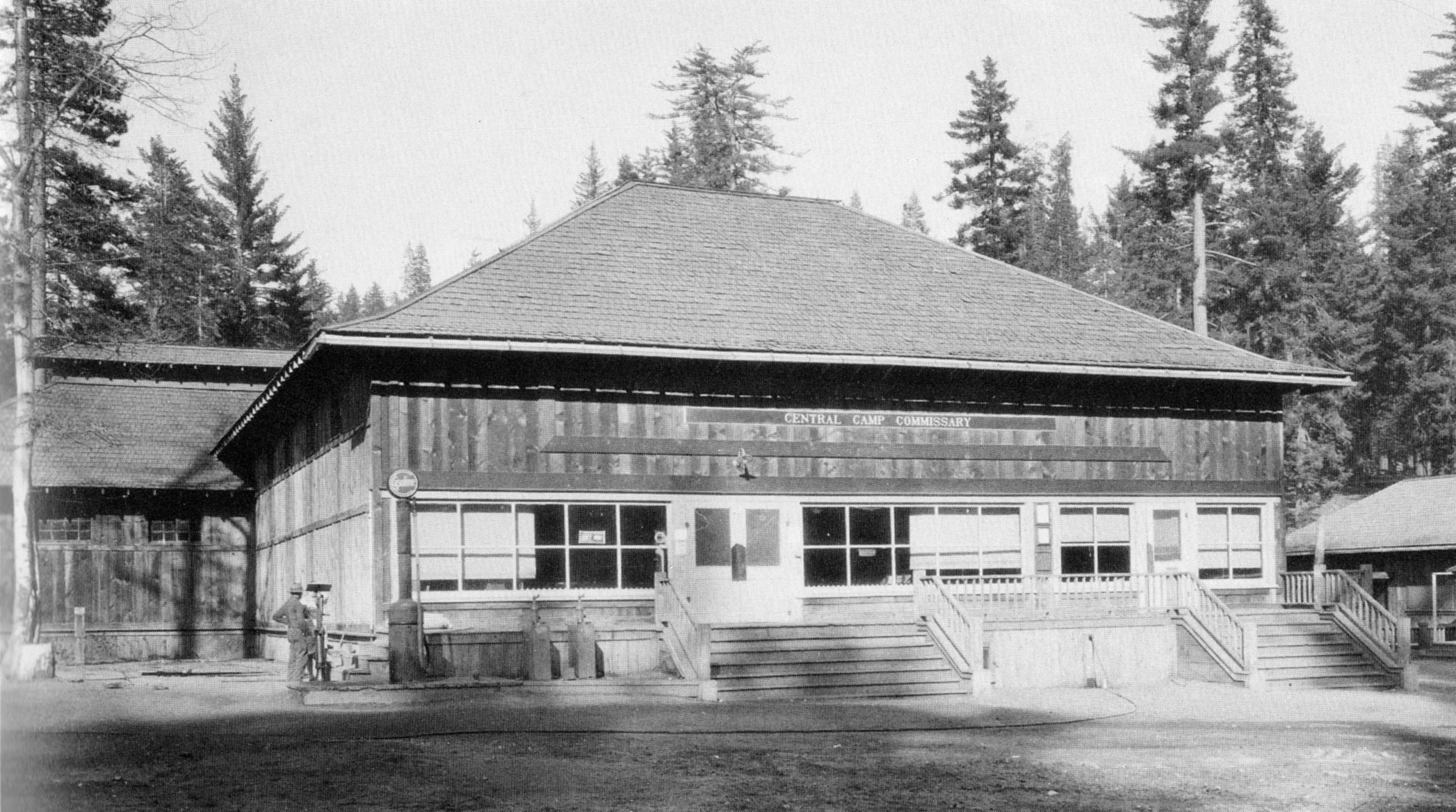
Company commissary

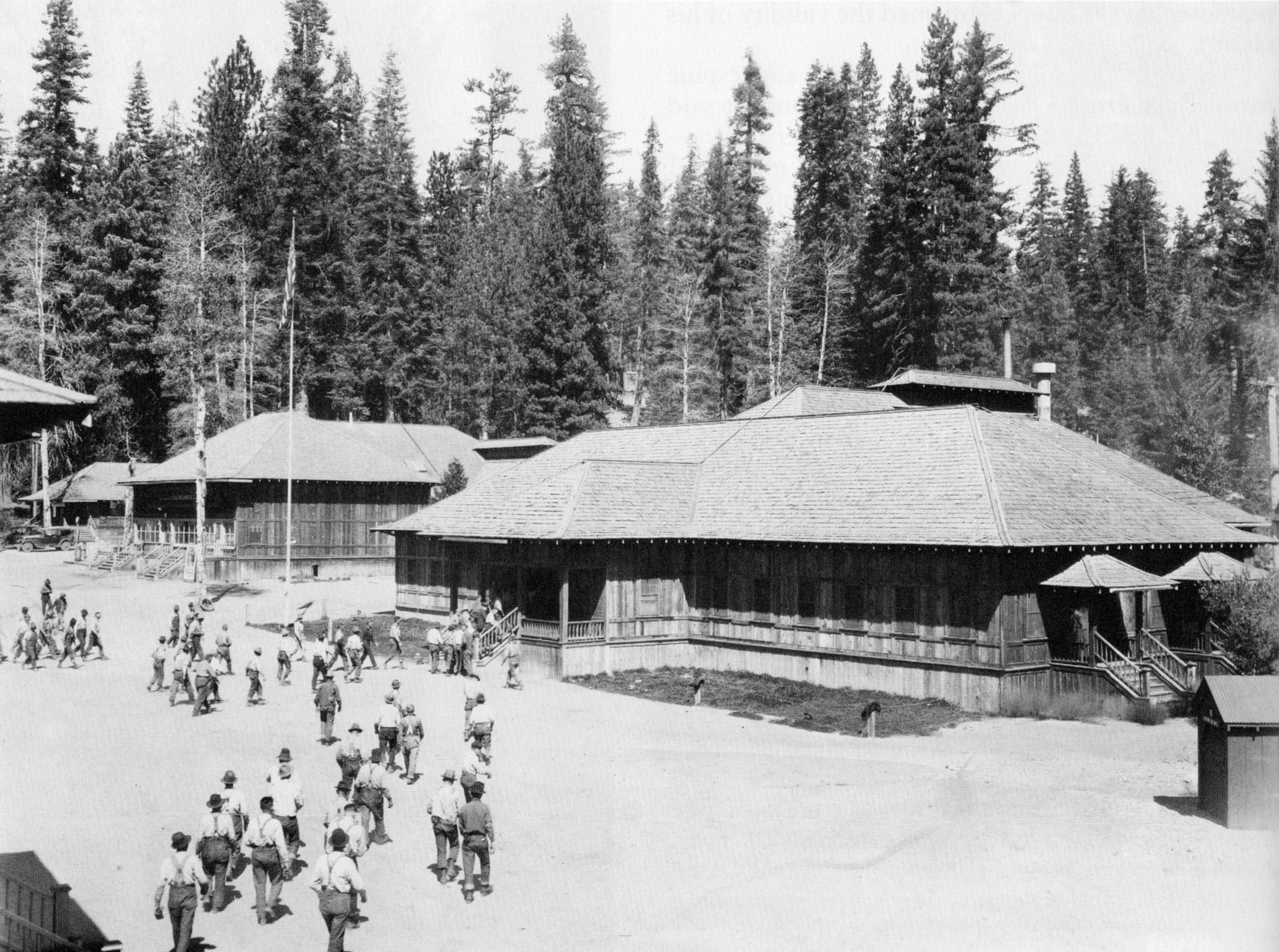
Central Camp cookhouse

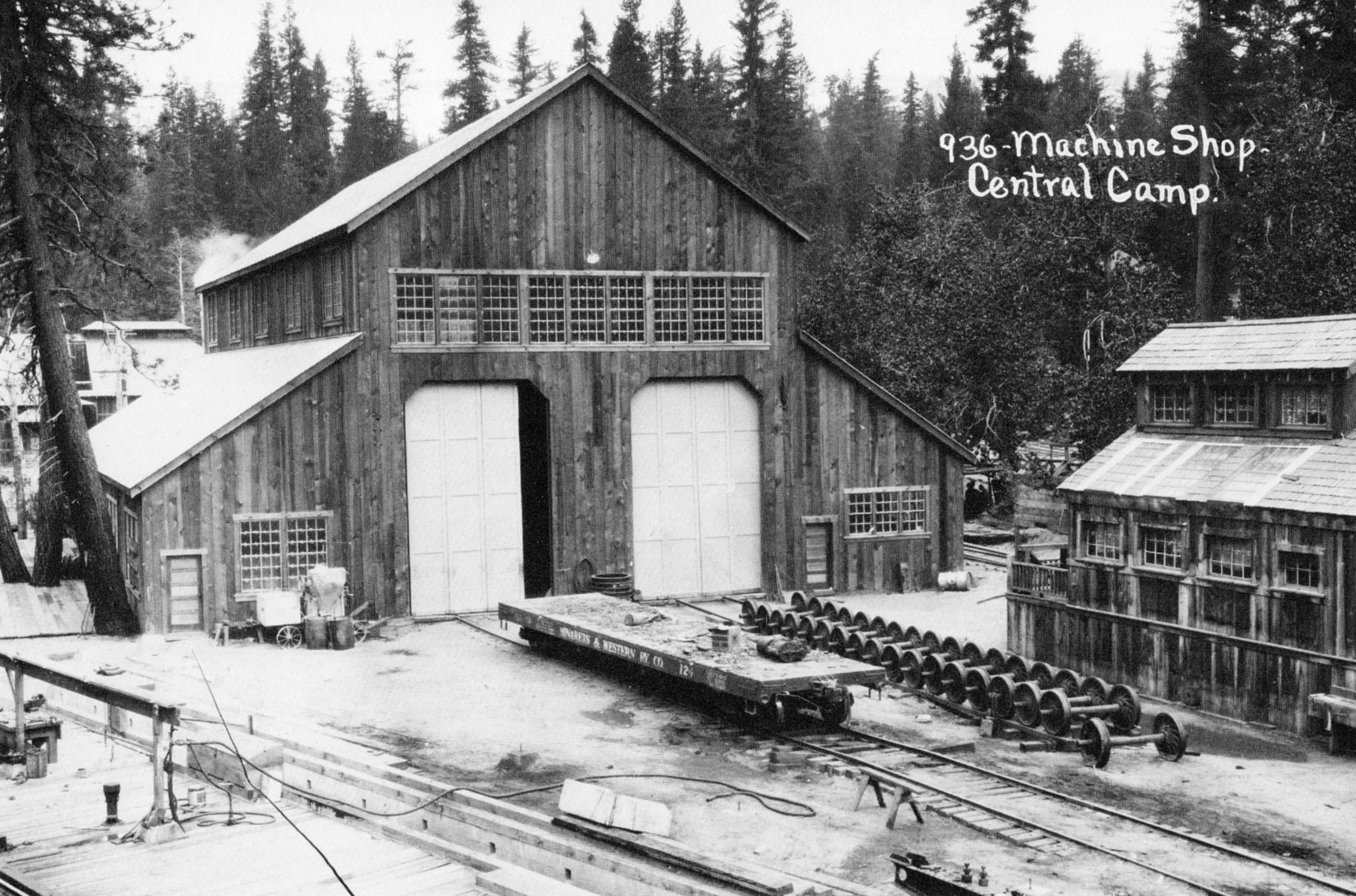
Machine shop

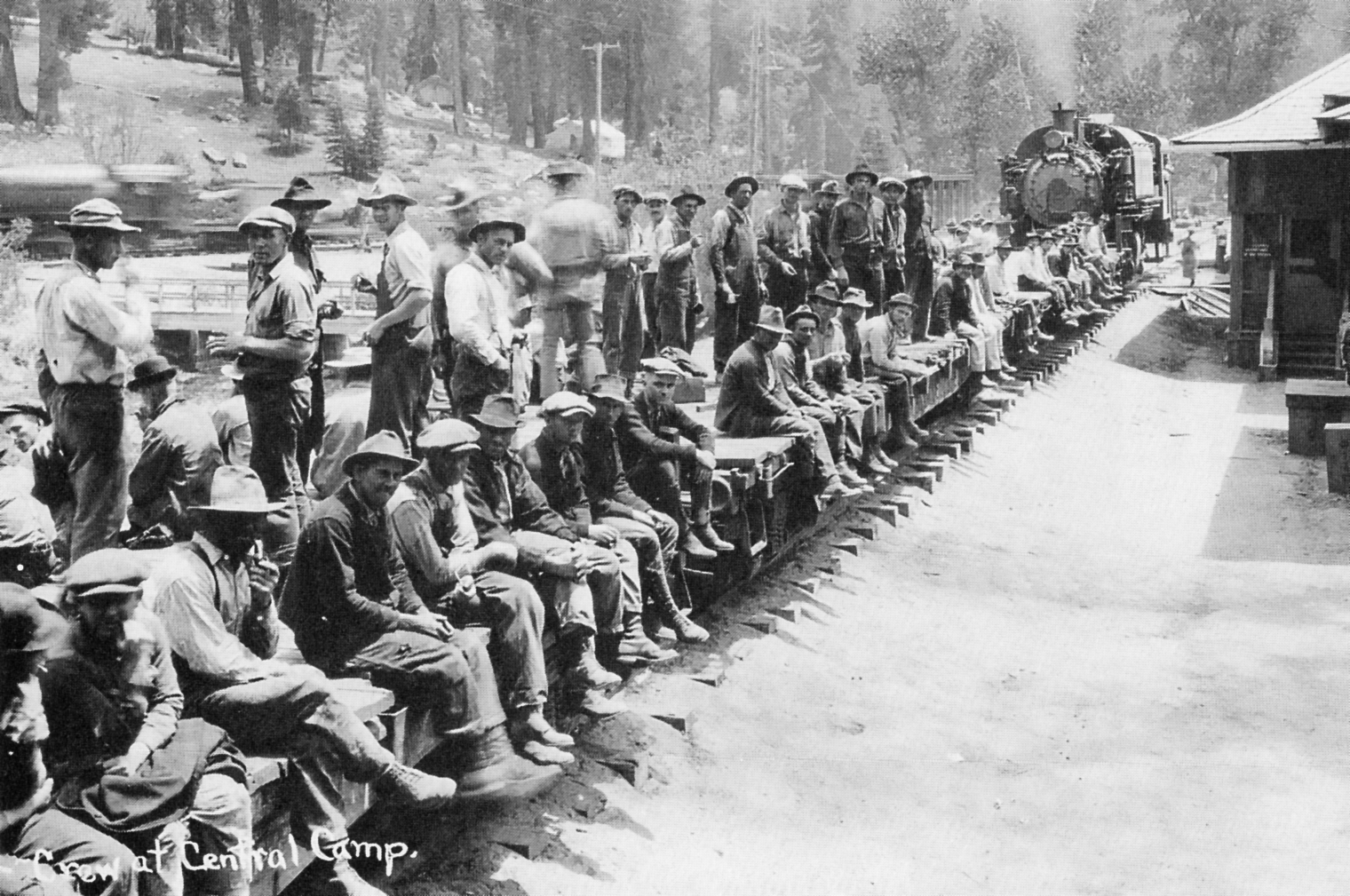
Sugar Pine Lumber Company man train
