= Sierra Vista Scenic Byway =

Scenic byway in California, U.S.

Sierra Vista National Forest Scenic Byway National Forest Scenic Byway

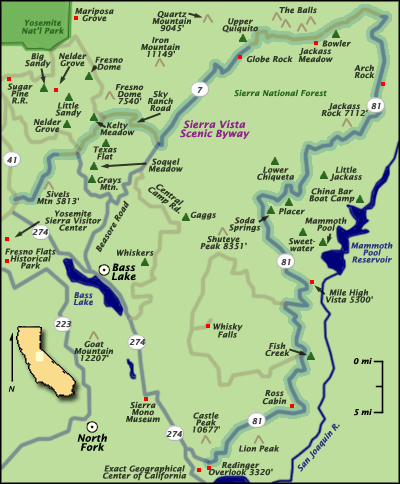
- Route through the Sierra National Forest

Route information
- Maintained by U.S. Forest Service
- Length: 100 mi (160 km)
- Existed: July 1989–present

Major junctions
- From: Minarets Road at Italian Bar Road near North Fork
- To: State Route 41 at Sky Ranch Road near Oakhurst

Location
- Country: United States
- Counties: Madera

Highway system
- Scenic Byways; National; National Forest; BLM; NPS

The Sierra Vista Scenic Byway is a National Forest Scenic Byway in the Sierra National Forest of Madera County, California. The route begins near North Fork and follows Minarets Road, Beasore Road, and connecting forest roads through the western Sierra Nevada, ending at State Route 41 near Oakhurst. The route passes the San Joaquin River canyon, Mammoth Pool Reservoir, high-elevation meadows and granite domes, and Nelder Grove of giant sequoias.

Designated in 1989, the byway incorporates roads originally developed for ranching, forest access, and hydroelectric development. Economic development in nearby rural communities was among the goals of the designation. The 2017 Railroad Fire and 2020 Creek Fire later changed the scenery along the byway and kept portions of the route closed for years.

== Route description ==
The Sierra Vista Scenic Byway begins north of North Fork at the junction of Minarets Road and Italian Bar Road. It follows Minarets Road (Forest Road 81) northeast into the Sierra National Forest, climbing above the San Joaquin River canyon and passing Mile High Vista before descending toward Mammoth Pool Reservoir.

The route continues on Beasore Road through the high-elevation meadows around Beasore Meadows, then turns south toward Cold Springs Summit. From there, it follows connecting forest roads past Fresno Dome and Nelder Grove before descending on Sky Ranch Road to State Route 41 north of Oakhurst.

The route is generally open from June through October, depending on snow and road conditions; high-elevation sections are not plowed in winter. Driving the entire route without stops takes about five hours.

== History ==
=== Development of the roads ===
The Sierra Vista Scenic Byway was assembled from existing mountain roads developed decades before its designation. Its principal routes, Beasore Road and Minarets Road, originated as access roads for ranching and hydroelectric development.

Cattlemen had long used the high-elevation meadows east of Bass Lake as summer range. A motor road to Beasore Meadows opened in 1925, generally following routes used to move livestock into the mountains. Jones Store, established at Beasore Meadows, served cattlemen and other travelers along what became Beasore Road.

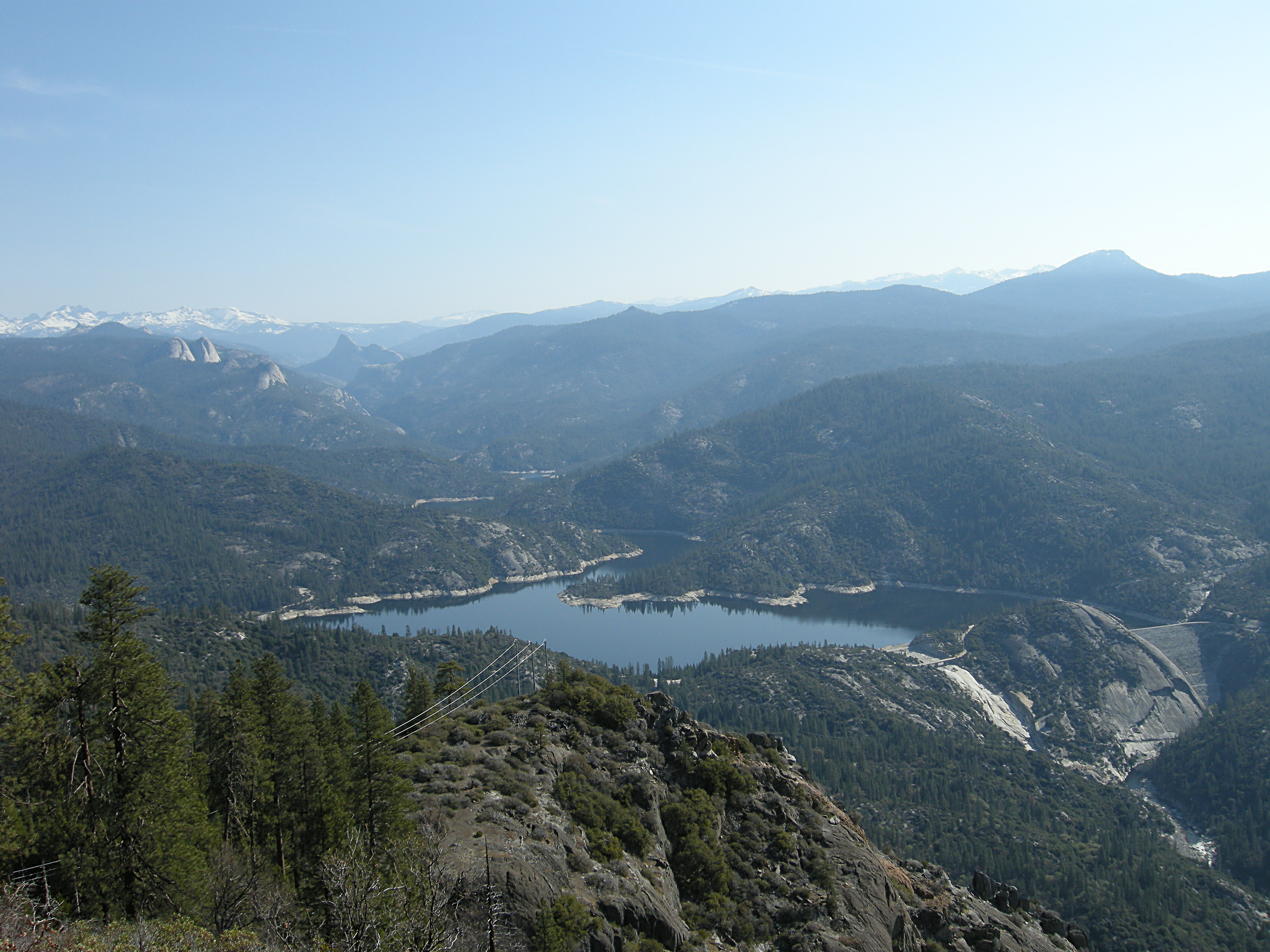
Mammoth Pool Reservoir from Mile High Vista on the scenic byway.

A separate road extended northeast from North Fork toward the San Joaquin River drainage by the 1930s. It was extended and improved during construction of Southern California Edison's Mammoth Pool hydroelectric project in the 1950s, with access roads built through the San Joaquin River canyon to the dam and powerhouse sites. This corridor became Minarets Road.

The improvement of Minarets Road coincided with proposals for the Minaret Summit Highway, which would have extended the route across the Sierra Nevada to Mammoth Lakes and the eastern Sierra. A 1957 federal study found the highway feasible, but it was never built. Beasore Road, Minarets Road, and connecting forest roads were later incorporated into the Sierra Vista Scenic Byway.

=== Scenic byway designation ===
The Forest Service established its National Forest Scenic Byways Program in May 1988 to identify existing roads providing access to scenic, recreational, and historic features. The Sierra Vista route was designated a National Forest Scenic Byway in July 1989.

Economic development in nearby rural communities, particularly North Fork, was among the goals of the designation. In April 1990, local residents formed the Sierra Vista Scenic Byway Association to promote and develop the route.

Early improvements included interpretive signs, overlooks, and the preservation of the nineteenth-century Jesse Ross Cabin near Minarets Road. The cabin was donated to the Forest Service in 1990 and restored for use as an information station along the byway.

=== Wildfires ===
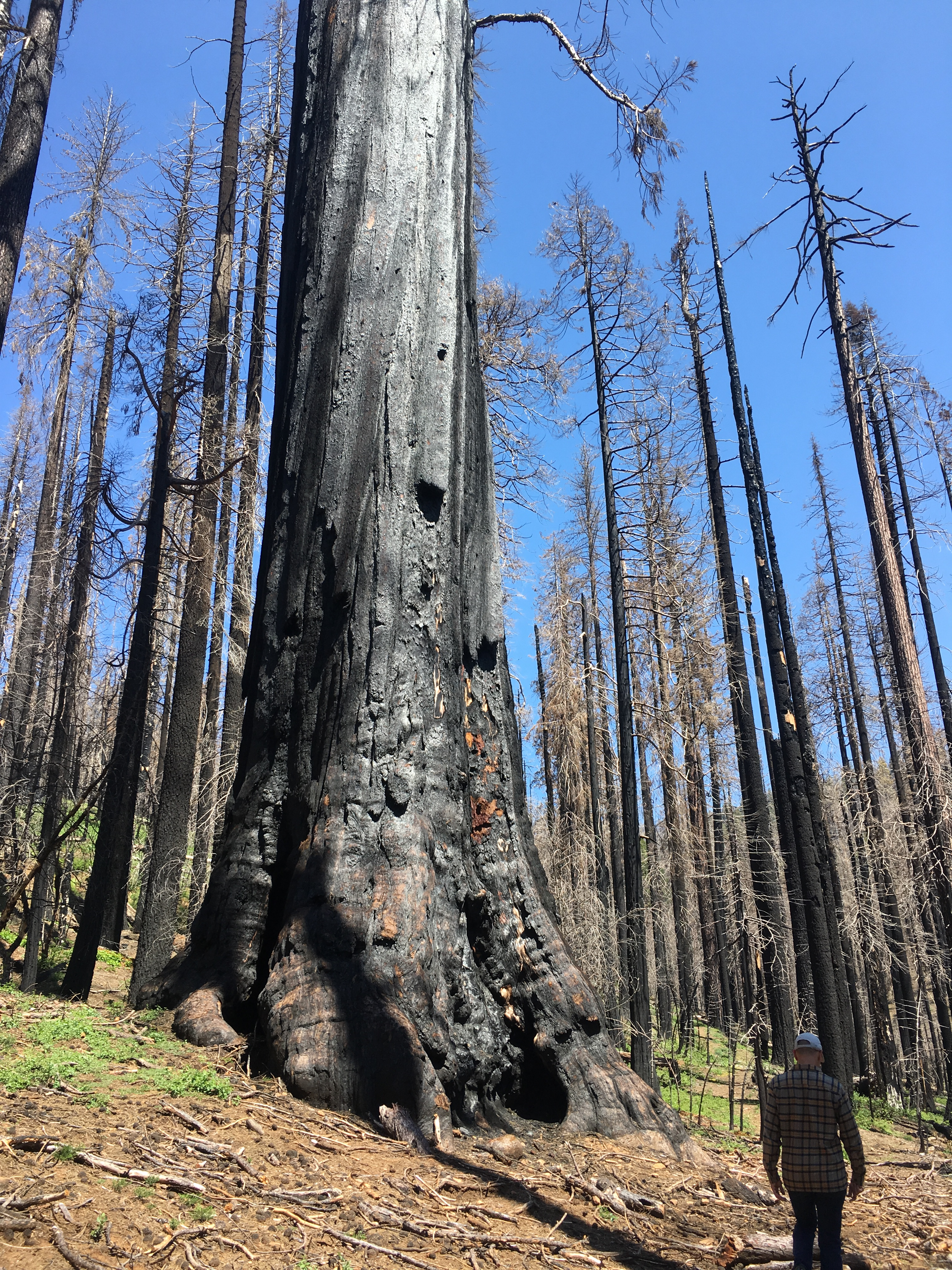
Nelder Grove after the Railroad Fire, May 2019.

Wildfires have repeatedly disrupted access to the byway and substantially altered the scenery along the route since its designation.

In 2017, the Railroad Fire burned portions of Nelder Grove, a giant sequoia grove near the southern end of the byway. The fire caused significant mortality among large sequoias in areas that burned at high severity.

The Creek Fire had a broader impact. Beginning near Big Creek on September 4, 2020, the fire spread through the Sierra National Forest and eventually burned 379,895 acres in Fresno and Madera counties. Large areas around Minarets Road, Mammoth Pool Reservoir, and the San Joaquin River drainage burned, killing extensive areas of forest along the route. The loss of forest cover changed views along Minarets Road, exposing terrain and distant vistas that had previously been screened by trees.

The fire also damaged roads and bridges. The Norris Creek Bridge on Forest Road 5S07 was destroyed, while work on the Upper Chiquito Creek bridge was interrupted. By May 2021, the Forest Service reported that the byway could not be traveled as a complete loop.

Restoring the route became a multi-year federal effort. Funding was provided for replacement of the Norris Creek Bridge and for rehabilitation of roads, campgrounds, vista points, drainage systems, and signs along the byway. Rehabilitation of approximately 70 miles of the byway was contracted in 2025.

== Points of interest ==
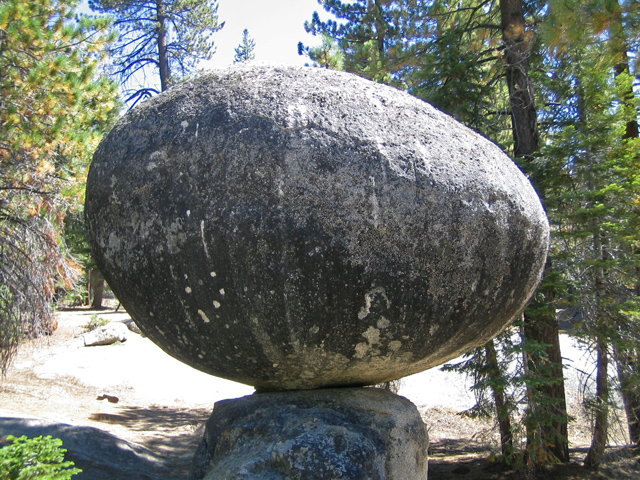
Globe Rock

=== Mile High Vista ===
Mile High Vista overlooks the San Joaquin River canyon and Mammoth Pool Reservoir. From the viewpoint, the Minarets, Mount Ritter, Mammoth Mountain, and other high peaks of the Sierra Nevada are visible.

=== Globe Rock ===
Globe Rock is a large rounded granite boulder perched on exposed bedrock along Beasore Road. Bedrock mortars surrounding the rock indicate its use by Mono people for processing acorns. Theodore Roosevelt was photographed at Globe Rock during a visit to the area.

=== Jones Store ===
Jones Store is a seasonal country store at Beasore Meadows along Beasore Road. The store historically served cattlemen moving livestock between the San Joaquin Valley and summer grazing areas in the high Sierra.

=== Cold Springs Summit ===
Cold Springs Summit, at 7,308 feet (2,227 m), is the highest point on the byway. A short trail from the summit leads to Cold Springs Meadow, with views toward Madera Peak.

=== Fresno Dome ===
Fresno Dome is a prominent granite dome rising above Soquel Meadow. A trail from near the byway leads to the summit, which provides panoramic views of the surrounding Sierra Nevada.

=== Nelder Grove ===
Nelder Grove is a giant sequoia grove near the southern end of the byway. The Forest Service manages the grove as the Nelder Grove Historical Area; it contains more than 100 mature giant sequoias as well as remnants of nineteenth-century logging. Notable trees include the Bull Buck Tree, once considered a contender for the title of the world's largest tree.

== Gallery ==
Jones Store at Beasore Meadows

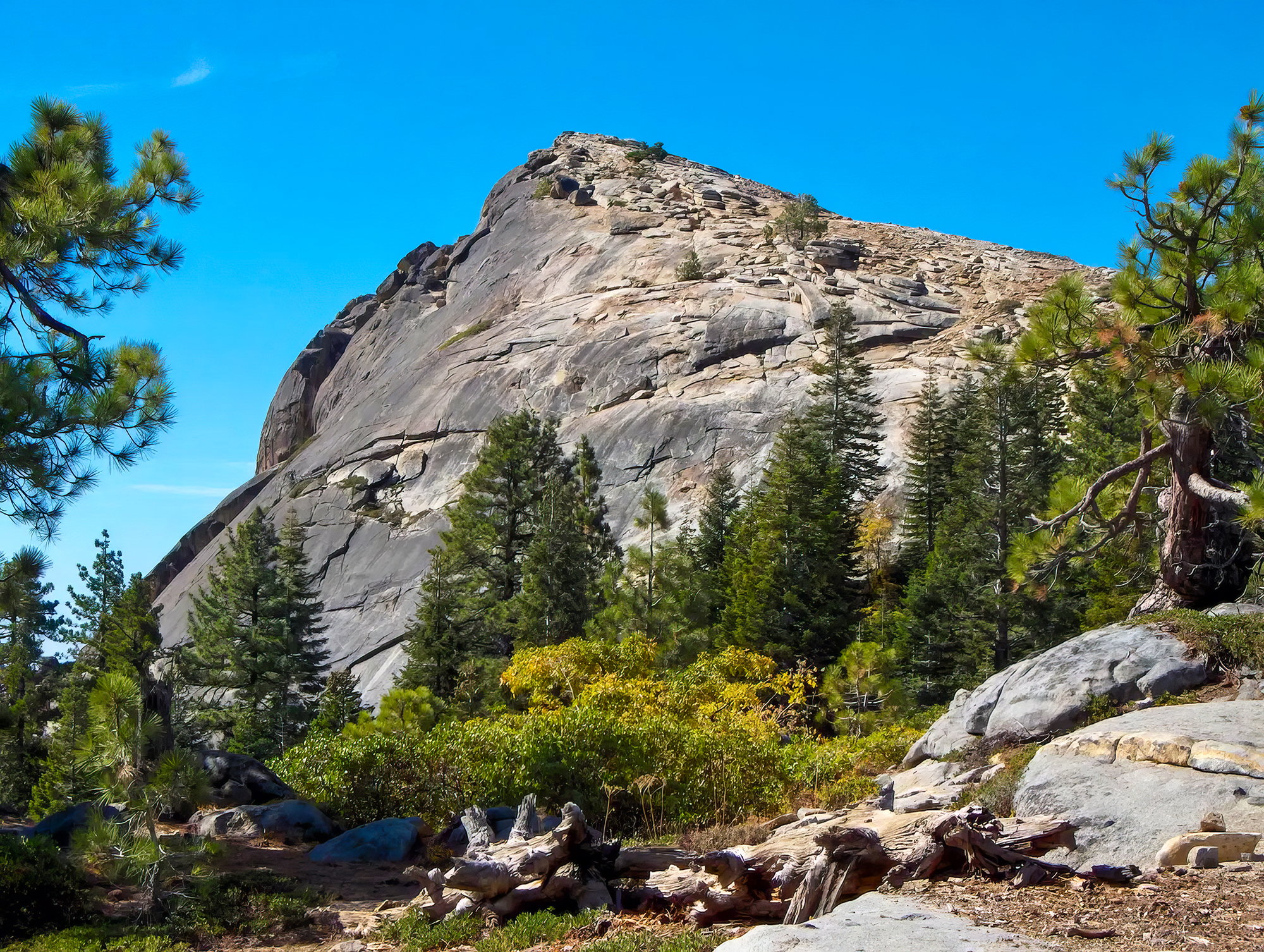
Fresno Dome

The Bull Buck Tree in Nelder Grove

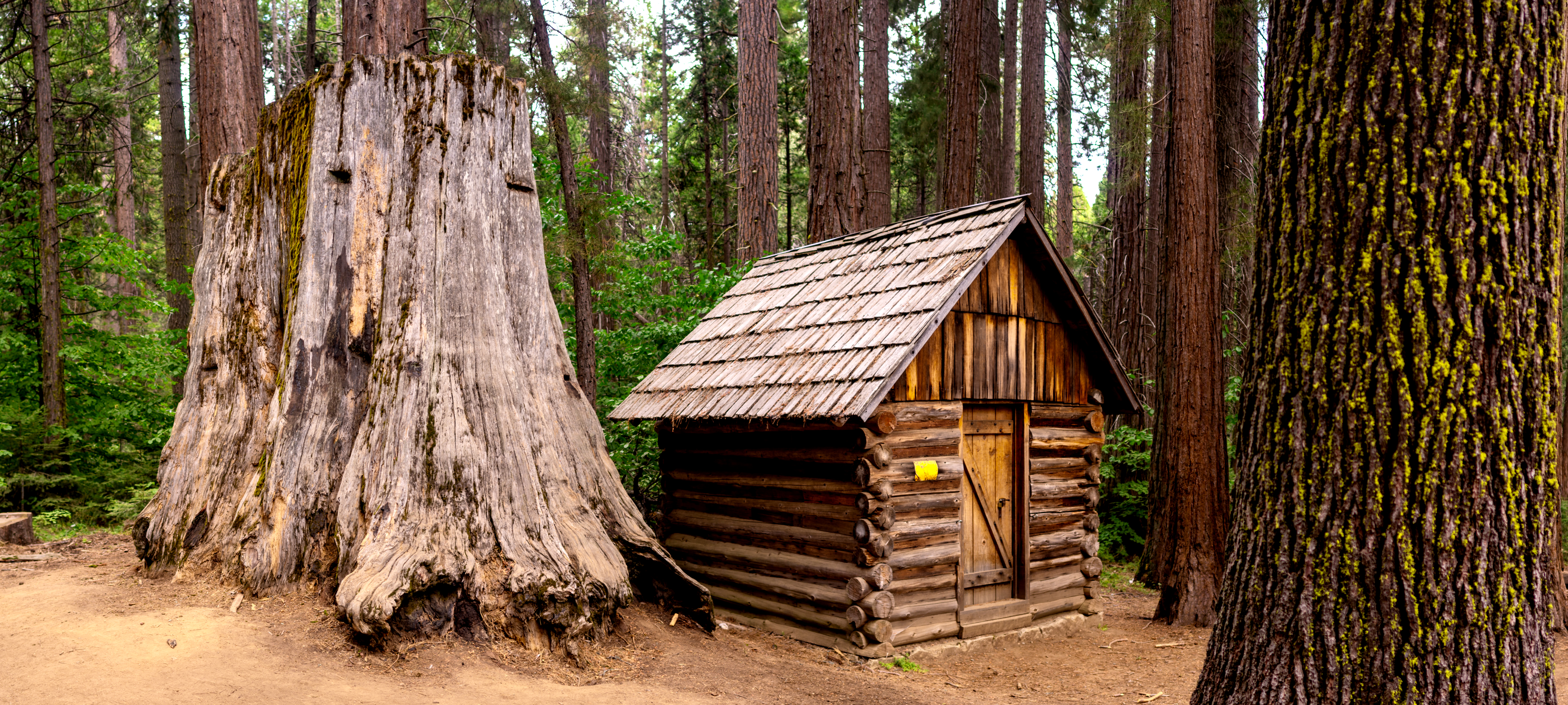
Historic Bildeo Meadow cabin at Nelder Grove
