= Mission Fire =

2017 wildfire in Central California

Mission Fire (2017)
- Part of the 2017 California wildfires
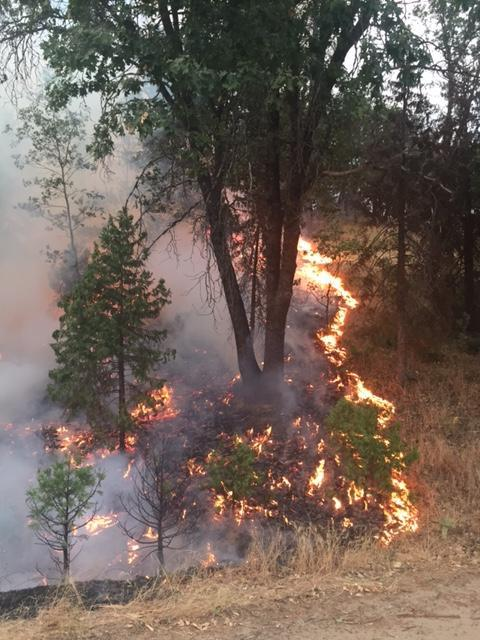
- The fire on September 3, 2017
- Date: September 3, 2017 –; September 13, 2017
- Location: Sierra National Forest, California, United States
- Coordinates: 37.21616°N 119.48067°W

Statistics
- Burned area: 1,035 acres (4 km^{2})

Impacts
- Structures destroyed: 4

Ignition
- Cause: Unknown

Map
- Location of fire in California.

The Mission Fire was a wildfire located two miles east of North Fork in the Sierra National Forest in California in the United States. The fire was reported on September 3, 2017. The cause of the fire is under investigation. The fire burned 1,035 acres (4 km^{2}) and destroyed 4 buildings. The fire was 100% contained on September 13, 2017. The fire threatened homes in the neighborhoods of Cascadel Woods and Benedict Meadow, the community of North Folk, the Northfork Rancheria of Mono Indians of California, and the Sierra National Forest. It was one of three fires burning in the vicinity of the Sierra National Forest and Yosemite National Park.

== Progression ==
The Mission Fire was reported on September 3, 2017, at 1:00 PM PDT, approximately two miles east of North Fork, California, near the neighborhood of Cascadel Woods, in the Sierra National Forest. The fire was located in steep terrain and was fueled by dead trees, mixed conifer and brush, which made it challenging for firefighters.

The fire burned close to Northfork Rancheria of Mono Indians of California tribal land, specifically sensitive areas. The tribe's archaeologist, Gaylen Lee, the tribe's Environmental Director, Christina McDonald, and the tribe's Cultural Specialist, Dene Fink accompanied fire crews, helping crews avoid disturbing sacred ground with large equipment, including dozers.

The fire was contained on September 13 and had burned a total of 1,035 acres (4 km^{2}). The cause of the fire is under investigation. The fire threatened 237 homes, damaged four buildings, and destroyed four. At its height, 1,739 personnel fought the fire.

== See also ==
- Empire Fire
- Railroad Fire
