= Muriel Peak =

Mountain in the state of California

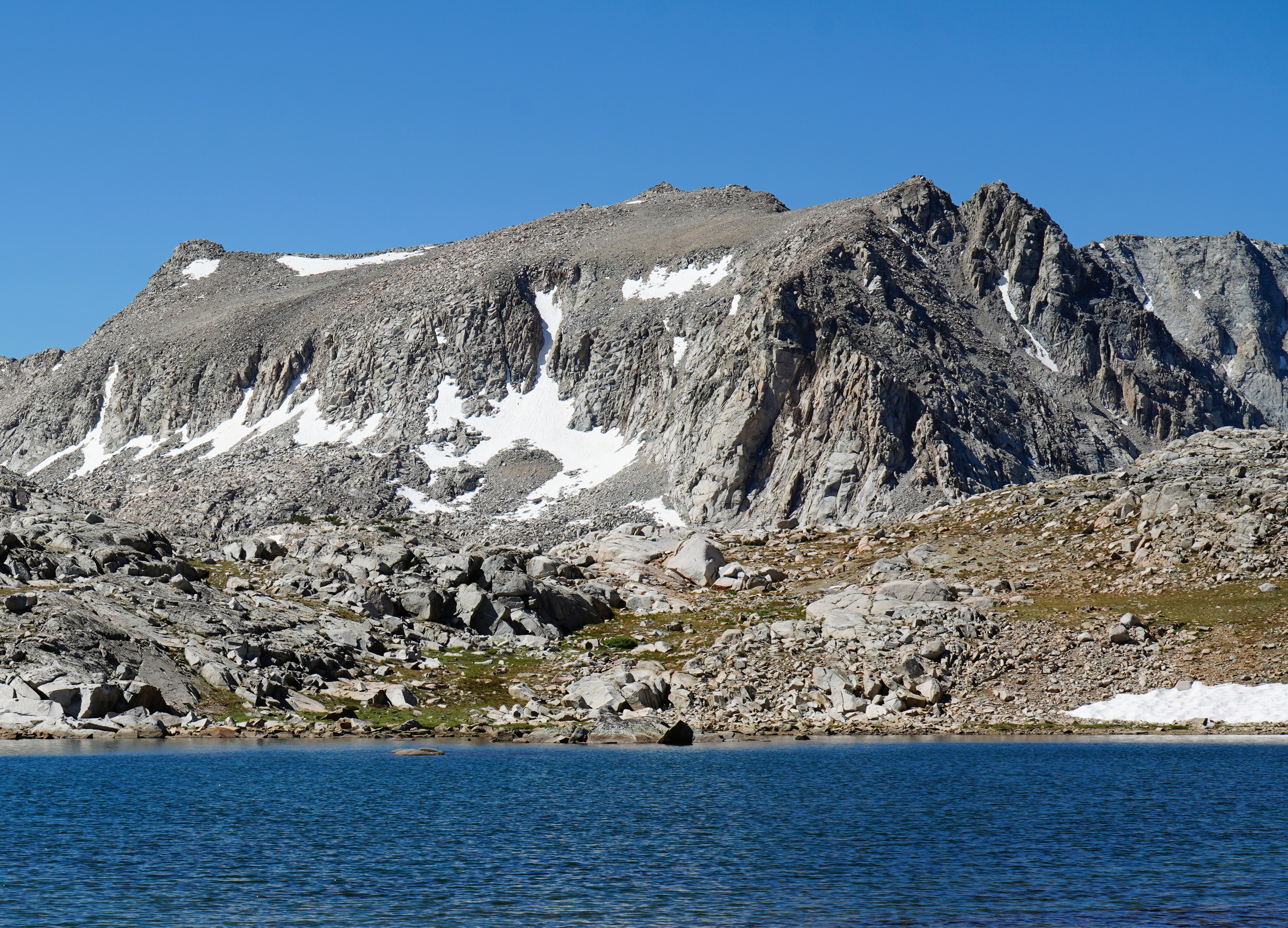
- North aspect

Highest point
- Elevation: 12,937 ft (3,943 m)
- Prominence: 377 ft (115 m)
- Parent peak: Mount Goethe (13,270 ft)
- Isolation: 0.96 mi (1.54 km)
- Coordinates: 37°13′02″N 118°41′35″W

Geography
- Location within California Location within the United States
- Country: United States
- State: California
- County: Fresno
- Protected area: John Muir Wilderness
- Parent range: Sierra Nevada
- Topo map: USGS Mount Darwin

Geology
- Rock age: Cretaceous
- Mountain type: Fault block
- Rock type: Granodiorite

Climbing
- First ascent: 1933
- Easiest route: class 2 Southwest ridge

Muriel Peak is a 12,937-foot-elevation (3,943-meter) double summit mountain located in the Sierra Nevada mountain range in Fresno County, California, United States. The true summit is set within the John Muir Wilderness on land managed by Sierra National Forest, whereas the slightly lower south summit is on the boundary shared with Kings Canyon National Park. It is situated one mile northeast of Mount Goethe and one mile south of Muriel Lake. Muriel Peak is the 167th-highest peak in California, and topographic relief is significant as the summit rises 1,600 feet (490 meters) above Muriel Lake.

== History ==
The first ascent of the summit was made July 8, 1933, by Hervey Voge, who also named this mountain. The landform's toponym has been officially adopted by the U.S. Board on Geographic Names, and was named in association with Muriel Lake which had previously been adopted in 1911. The origin of the lake's etymology is a mystery, but was likely applied during a 1907–09 USGS topographic survey.

== Climate ==
According to the Köppen climate classification system, Muriel Peak is located in an alpine climate zone. Most weather fronts originate in the Pacific Ocean, and travel east toward the Sierra Nevada mountains. As fronts approach, they are forced upward by the peaks (orographic lift), causing them to drop their moisture in the form of rain or snowfall onto the range. Precipitation runoff from this mountain drains north into headwaters of Piute Creek which is a tributary of the South Fork San Joaquin River.

== Gallery ==
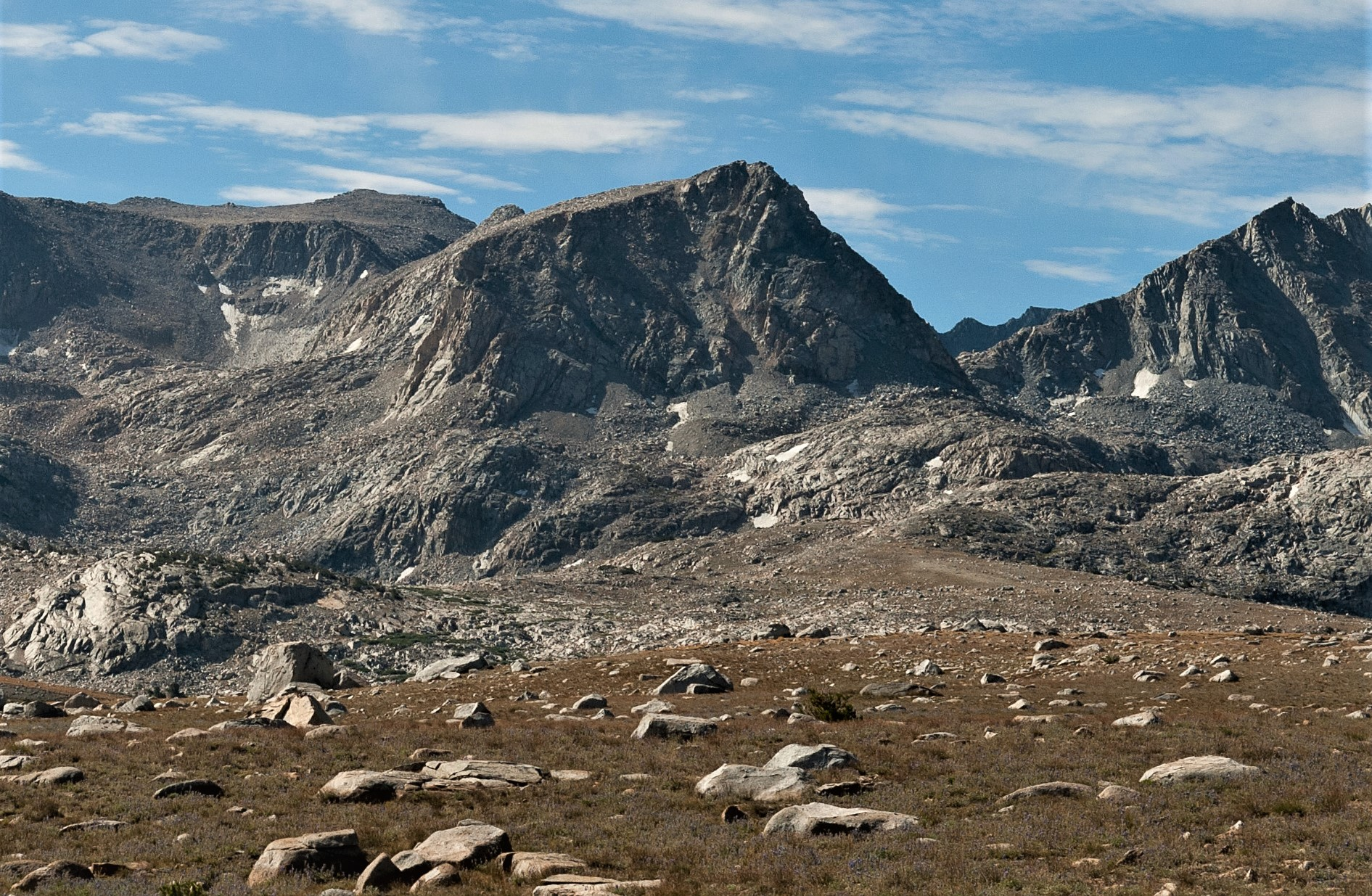
North aspect

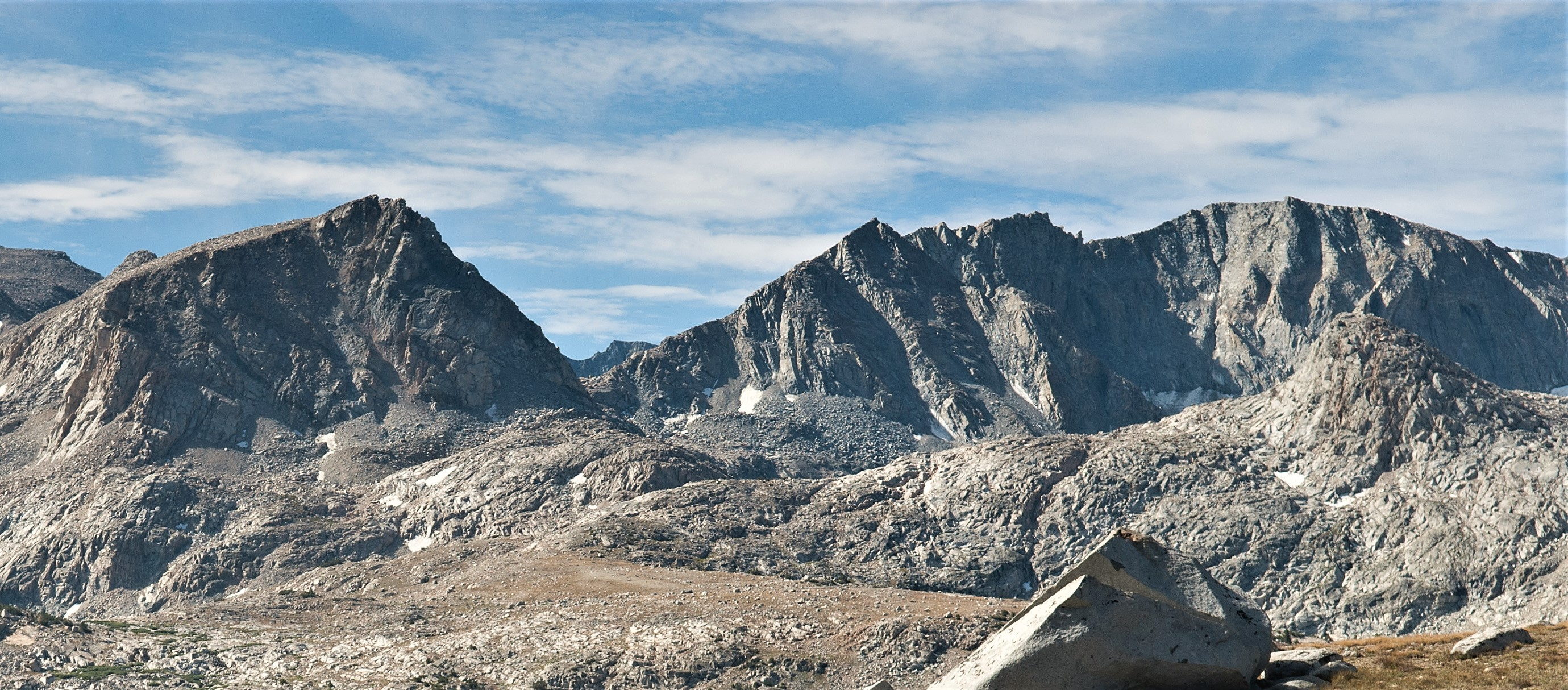
Muriel Peak (left), Mount Goethe (right)

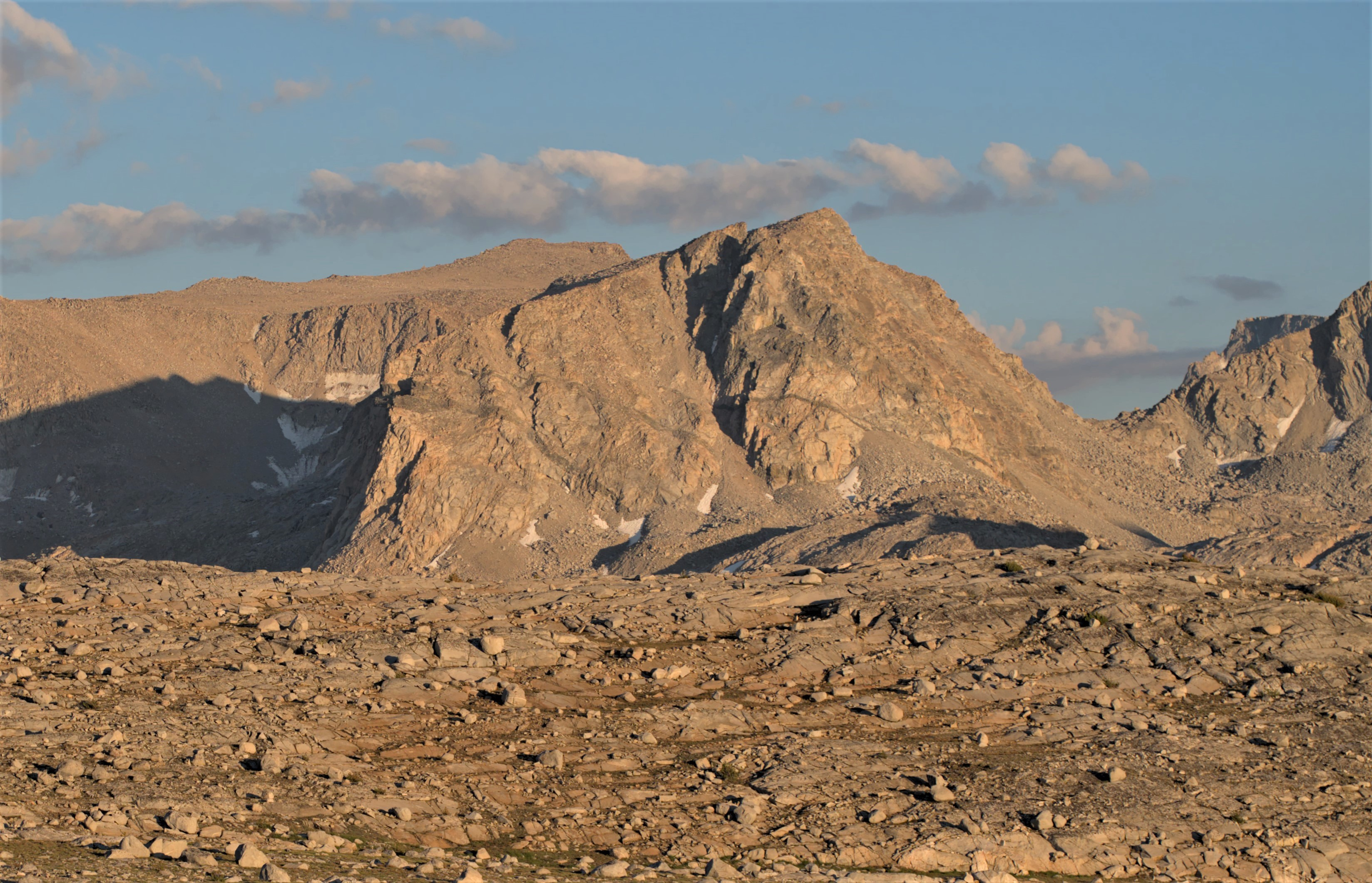
Muriel Peak at sunset

== See also ==
- List of mountain peaks of California
