= Fresno Dome =

Granite dome in the state of California

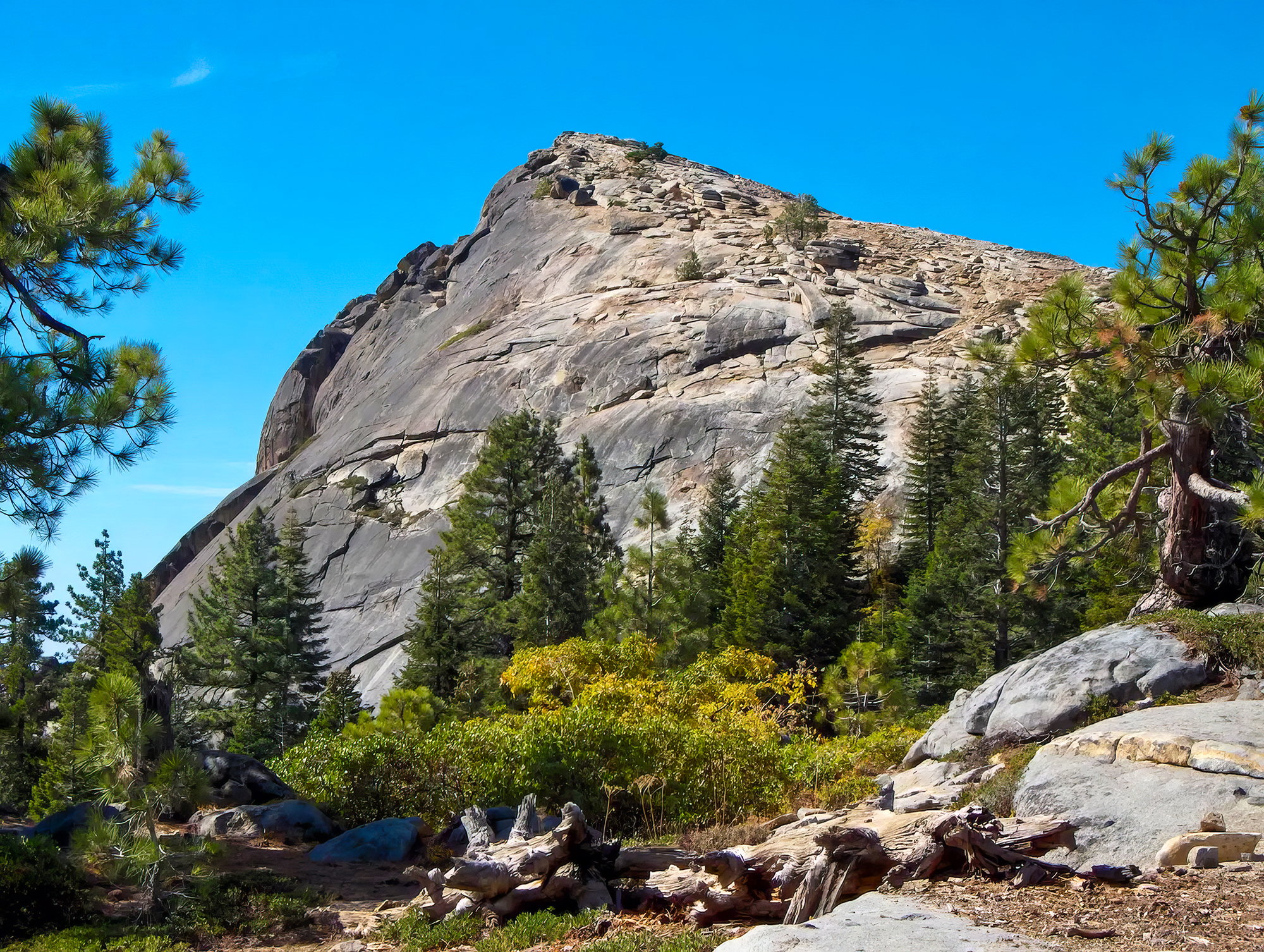
- Fresno Dome's northern face as seen from the Fresno Dome trail.

Highest point
- Elevation: 7,544 ft (2,299 m) NAVD 88
- Prominence: 260 ft (79 m)
- Coordinates: 37°27′16″N 119°32′12″W

Geography
- Location within California Location within the United States
- Location: Sierra National Forest, Madera County, California, U.S.
- Parent range: Sierra Nevada
- Topo map: USGS White Chief Mountains

Geology
- Rock age: Cretaceous
- Mountain type: Granite dome

Climbing
- Easiest route: Trail hike (class 1)

Fresno Dome is a dominant granite dome rising in isolation above the forest of Soquel Meadow in the Sierra National Forest in Madera County, California.

The dome as known to the Mono Indians as "the greeting place" ("wah-me-yelo"). John Muir encountered Fresno Dome, calling it "Wamello", in the 1870s, and used its summit to locate Fresno Grove (now known as Nelder Grove).

It is accessible by a trailhead which is a three-mile drive from the Sierra Vista Scenic Byway (part of the National Scenic Byway system). The nearest town is Bass Lake, California, 9.1 miles (14.6 km) to the south.

At its base, sits the Fresno Dome campground, a backwoods campground accessible only by jeep trails. The campground is a favorite spot for deer hunters and is largely empty other than during deer season. The dome offers several technical free climbs rated class 5 or better, with "Guides in a Snowbank" rated at 5.10a.

== See also ==
- Half Dome
- Lembert Dome
- Batholith
- Geology of the Yosemite area
