= Goethe Glacier =

Glacier in California, United States

- Location within California
- Type: Mountain glacier
- Location: Sierra National Forest, Fresno County, California, U.S.
- Coordinates: 37°12′29″N 118°42′30″W
- Length: .15 mi (0.24 km)
- Terminus: Talus
- Status: Retreating

Goethe Glacier is a small glacier located in the Sierra Nevada Range in the John Muir Wilderness of Sierra National Forest in the U.S. state of California. The glacier is northwest of Mount Goethe (13,264 ft (4,043 m)).

== See also ==
- List of glaciers in the United States
