= Kaiser Wilderness =

Protected wilderness area in California, United States

- IUCN category Ib (wilderness area)
- Location within California Location within the United States
- Interactive map of Kaiser Wilderness
- Location: Fresno County, California
- Nearest city: Fresno, California US
- Coordinates: 37°25′00″N 119°10′00″W
- Area: 22,700 acres (92 km^{2})
- Established: October 19, 1976
- Governing body: US Department of Agriculture / U.S. Forest Service

The Kaiser Wilderness is a federally designated wilderness protected area located 70 miles (110 km) northeast of Fresno in the state of California, USA. It was added to the National Wilderness Preservation System by the United States Congress on October 19, 1976. The wilderness is 22,700 acres (92 km^{2}) in size, is one of five wilderness areas within the Sierra National Forest and is managed by the US Forest Service.

The Kaiser Wilderness stretches along an east–west ridge and is separated from the High Sierra by the South Fork San Joaquin River canyon. It is a miniature version of the Sierra, with elevations from 7,200 feet (2,200 m) to 10,320 feet (3,150 m) at Kaiser Peak, and is composed of glacier-scoured granite blocks, cirques, lakes, granitic cliffs and alpine peaks. Although a small wilderness, it is part of the almost contiguous federal wilderness areas along the Sierra Nevada Mountain Range with the John Muir Wilderness on the east, and Ansel Adams Wilderness to the northeast. Immediately south is Huntington Lake, a rustic summer time resort area. China Peak Ski Resort lies south of the Wilderness as well

The forest consists of white fir, Jeffrey pine, red fir, western white pine, and mountain hemlock. On Kaiser Ridge there are stands of lodgepole pine, and at timberline whitebark pine and Sierra juniper grow in mats of krummholtz. Willows and alders grow along the perennial streams that form the drainage area of the South Fork of the San Joaquin River.

Some of the popular lakes in the Kaiser Wilderness are George Lake, and Upper Twin Lake, with Upper Twin Lake having a cave where the outlet stream disappears into and then flows underground for several hundred yards before resurfacing.

Recreational activities include day hiking, backpacking, horseback riding, fishing, rock scrambling, nature photography and snowshoeing. A wilderness permit is required for overnight trips into the Kaiser Wilderness. The Forest Service encourages the practice of Leave No Trace principles of outdoor travel to minimize human impact on the environment.

The western portion was ravaged by the 2020 Creek Fire. Trails in that area are either badly damaged or completely gone, now covered by thousands of fallen trees and emerging undergrowth.
