= San Joaquin Experimental Range =

- San Joaquin Biosphere Reserve
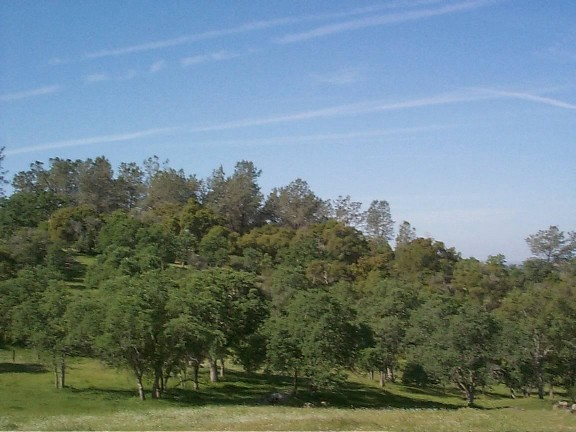
- A wooded hillside in the San Joaqin Biosphere Reserve

- Location within California Location within the United States
- Location: Madera County, California, USA
- Nearest city: Fresno, California
- Coordinates: 37°05′N 119°43′W
- Area: 1,832 hectares (7.07 sq mi)
- Established: 1976
- Governing body: United States Forest Service

The San Joaquin Experimental Range is an ecosystem research experimental area in the foothills of the Sierra Nevada. The range is located in O'Neals, California, outside of the Sierra National Forest about 32 kilometres (20 mi) north of Fresno, California. The range includes a portion of California grassland and California woodlands with blue oak, interior live oak, and bull pine.

The San Joaquin Experimental Range was established after a statement on the need for an experimental area in the San Joaquin Valley foothills was prepared in 1934. The initial purpose for the San Joaquin Experimental Range was to learn how to better manage these lands and investigate resource and animal husbandry problems associated with maintaining a commercial cattle herd on a year-round basis on the foothill rangelands. San Joaquin lands were purchased in 1934 (1,387 hectares or 3,427 acres), with additional purchases in 1936 (16 hectares or 40 acres) and 1937 (372 hectares or 919 acres). In 1938, another 64 ha were obtained under authority of the Weeks Forestry Act. Of these, 32 ha have been designated as a Research Natural Area. The San Joaquin is managed cooperatively by the Pacific Southwest Research Station of the United States Forest Service and California State University's Agricultural Foundation, primarily for research and education. Facilities include limited conference facilities, office space, barracks, and storage space available for approved research.

Today, long-term records on livestock gains and herbage yield and utilization are available. Parts of the range have served as a Research Natural Area, protected from fire and ungrazed by domestic livestock since 1934. Remaining portions of the range have been grazed by various classes of livestock during different seasons. Some range units have been modified through the application of fertilizers. Prescribed burning has been used in some units for forage improvement.

A cowherd and facilities at the experimental range also provide opportunities for students to gain practical experience in the commercial cattle industry.

The range was established as a UNESCO Biosphere Reserve under the designation San Joaquin Biosphere Reserve in 1976. Its biosphere reserve status was withdrawn in 2019, at the request of the US Government.

== Administration ==
The range's administration is located at San Joaquin Experimental Range USDA Forest Service Sierra Nevada Research Center 2081 East Sierra Avenue Fresno, CA 93710

A research center and lab is located at San Joaquin Experimental Range California State University-Fresno School of Agricultural Sciences and Technology 2385 East Barstow Avenue Fresno, CA 93740
