= Railroad Fire =

2017 wildfire in Central California

- Part of the 2017 California wildfires
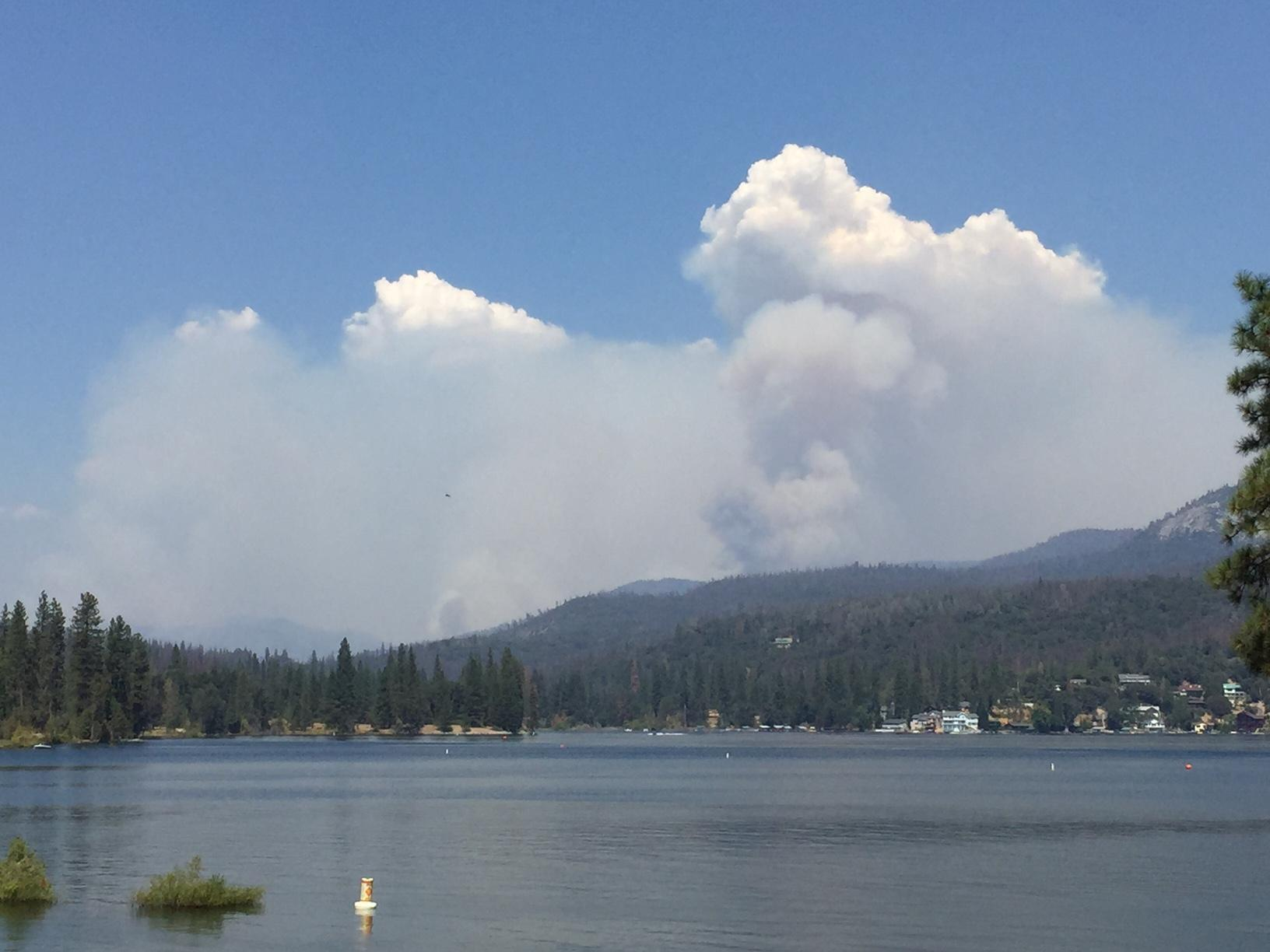
- The Railroad Fire from Bass Lake on September 1, 2017
- Date: August 29, 2017 –; October 24, 2017
- Location: Sierra National Forest, California, United States
- Coordinates: 37.449°N 119.65°W

Statistics
- Burned area: 12,407 acres (50 km^{2})

Ignition
- Cause: Unknown

Map
- Location of fire in California.

The Railroad Fire was a wildfire that burned in between the communities of Sugar Pine and Fish Camp in the Sierra National Forest in California, United States. The fire was reported on August 29, 2017 and burned 12,407 acres (50 km^{2}) before it was fully contained on October 24. It occurred during the historic 2011–2017 California drought. The cause of the fire remains unknown.

The fire threatened communities in the area, historic buildings in the Nelder Grove Historic Area, Tenaya Lodge, and Yosemite Mountain Sugar Pine Railroad, which the fire was named after. It also impacted tourism and air quality in the forest and Yosemite National Park. It killed 39 out of the remaining 104 giant sequoias in Nelder Grove.

== Progression ==
The Railroad Fire was reported on August 29, 2017 in the area between the communities of Sugar Pine and Fish Camp the Sierra National Forest. The cause is unknown. On September 3, mandatory evacuations were ordered for the Sky Ranch Road area, due to the fire spreading towards residential areas after a storm, including the Cedar Valley Subdivision. On Labor Day crews wrapped historic structures in the Nelder Grove Historic Area, including cabins dating back to the late 1800s, in protective, heat-shielding material.

As of September 7, Pacific Gas & Electric began working to re-establish electricity in the fire area and increased humidity overnight helped slow the fire. By September 10, the fire had burned 12,358 acres (50 km^{2}) and was 70% contained, with 1,035 personnel fighting the fire. Crews were pulled from the fire lines on the evening of September 11 due to thunderstorms that brought a quarter inch of rain into the area. On October 24, the wildfire was fully contained.

== Effects ==
=== Impacts to giant sequoia ===
The fire burned through much of Nelder Grove killing 38 of the grove's 92 monarch trees and forcing the permanent closure of The Shadow of the Giants trail.

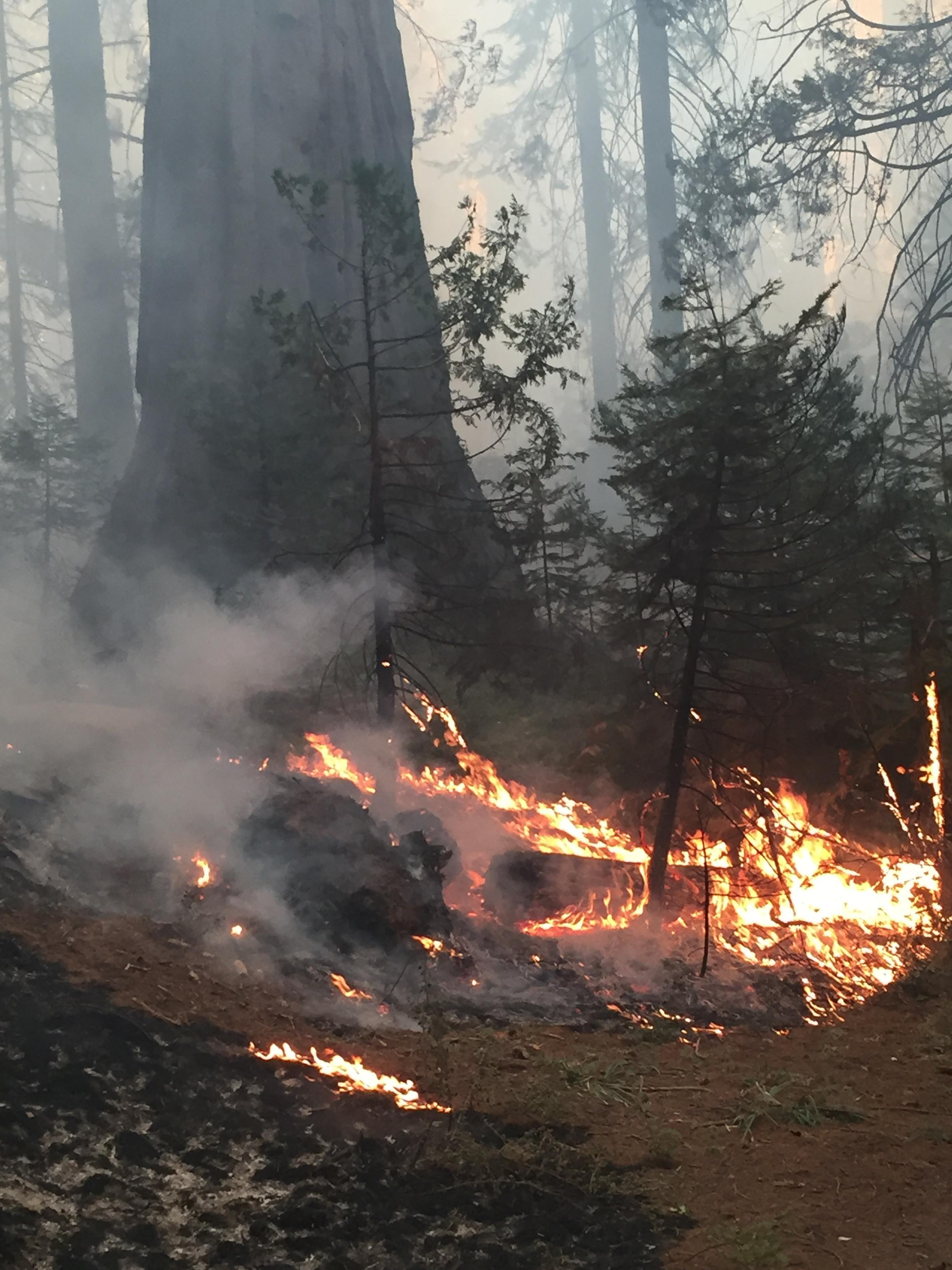
Fire burning in Nelder Grove on September 10, 2017.

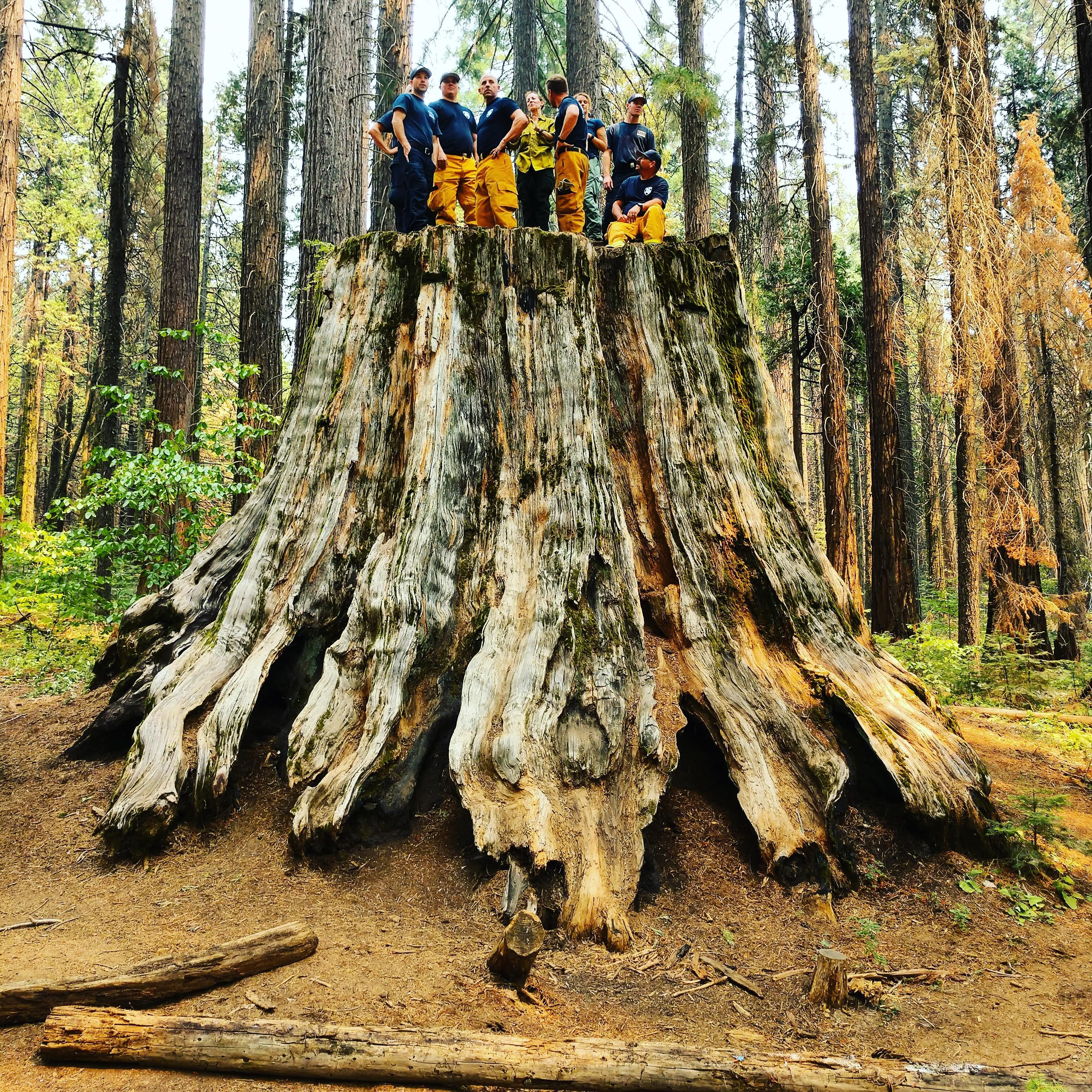
Firefighters pose atop a giant sequoia stump.

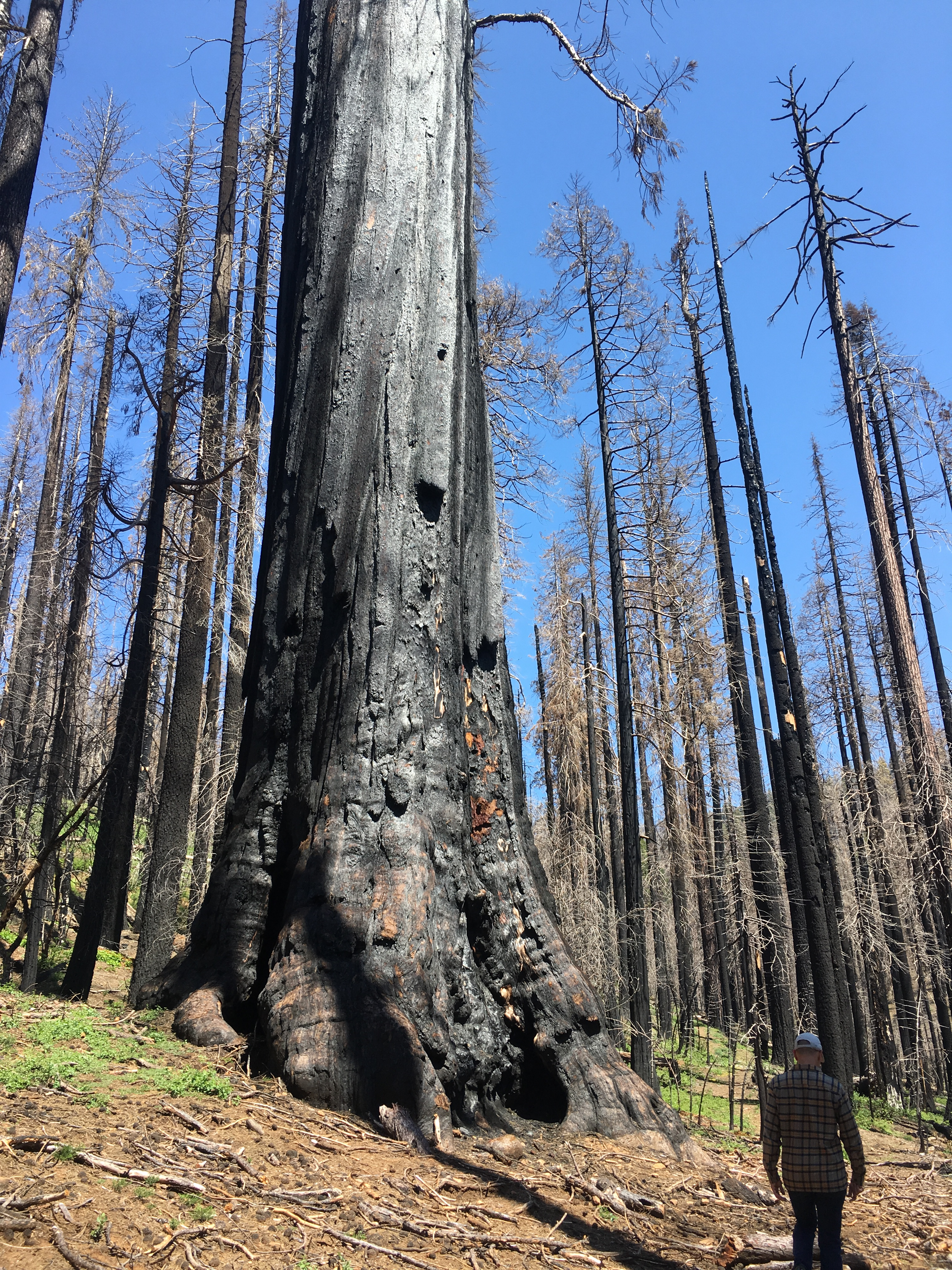
Portions of Nelder Grove became a snag forest after exposure to high intensity wildfire.

=== Air quality ===
The air quality in the area declined rapidly due to the fire, which had been burning concurrently with two others in the region. Yosemite National Park reported that air quality was "unhealthy" in the park as of September 6. Additionally, the US Forest Service reported that air quality was "hazardous" in Wawona. That same day, Yosemite High School released students early from school due to poor air quality.

== Gallery ==
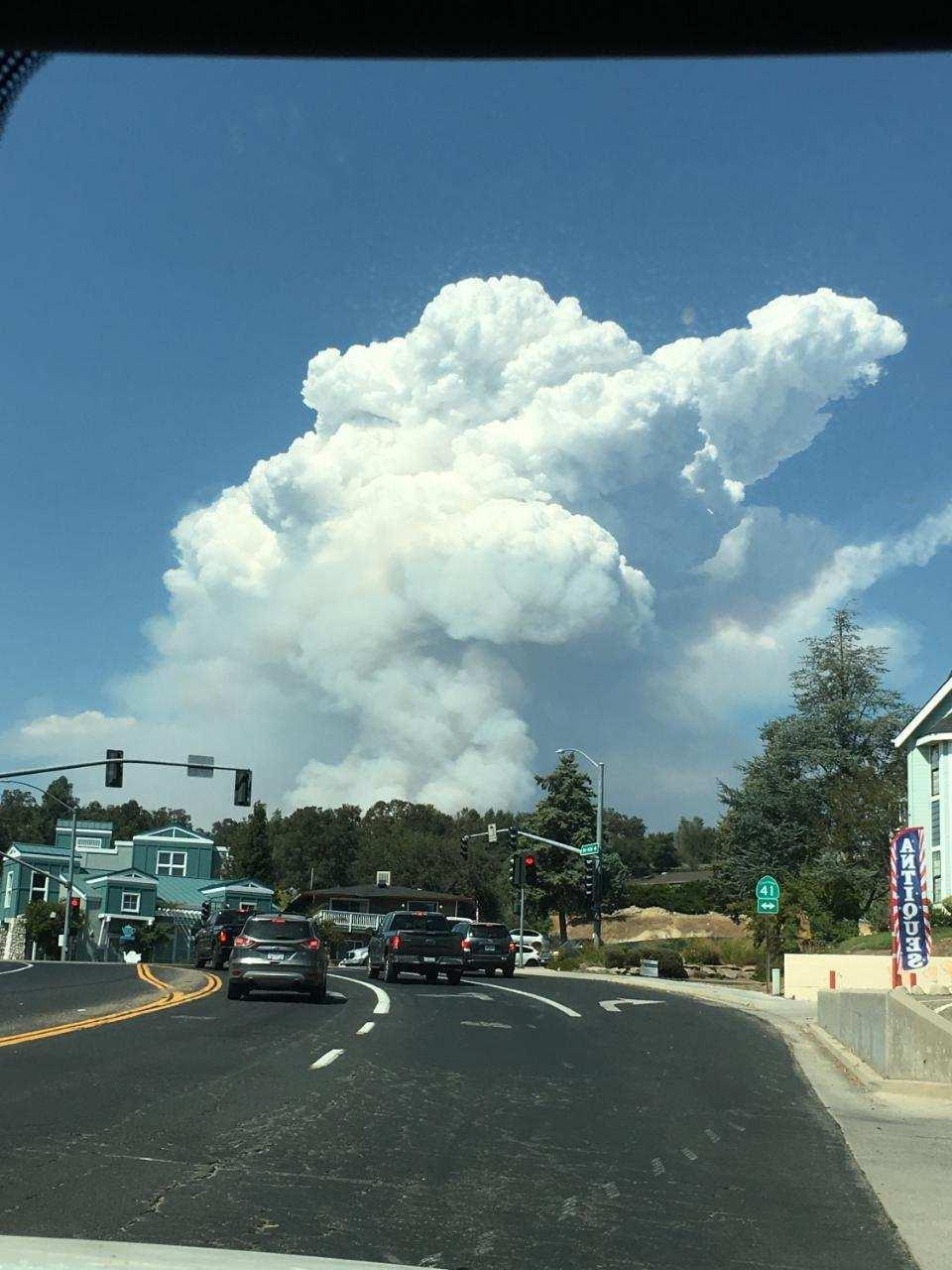
The first day of the fire as seen from nearby Oakhurst.

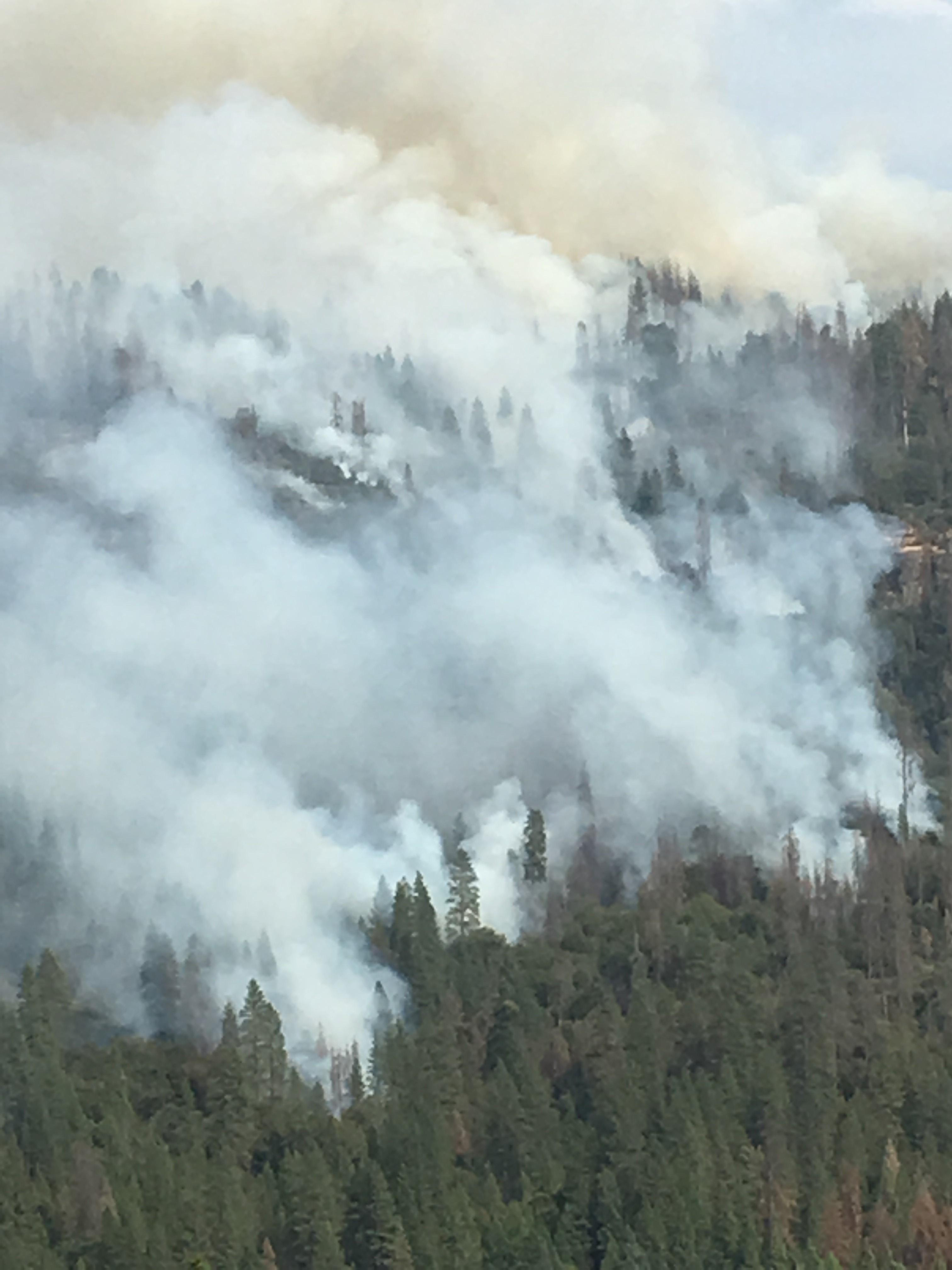
Defensive burning above Cedar Valley.

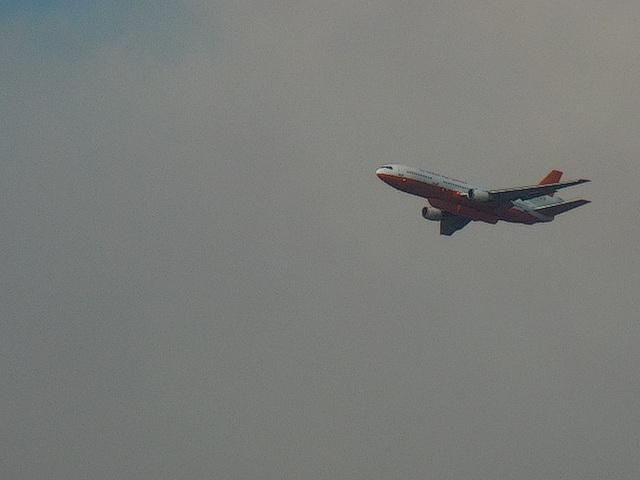
A DC-10 VLAT fights the fire from above.

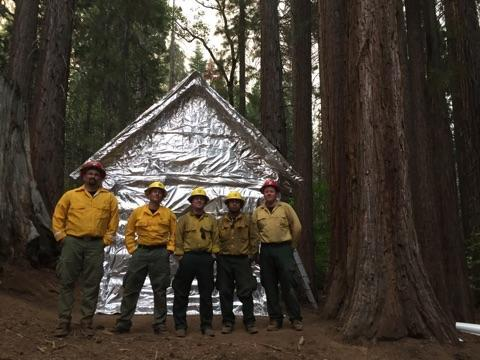
Historic structures are wrapped in Nelder Grove.

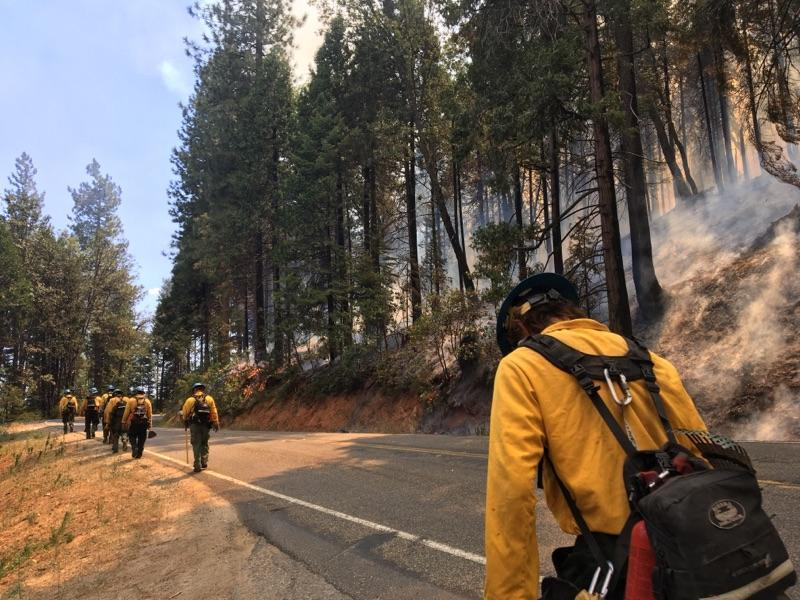
Firefighters walk along Highway 41.

== See also ==
- 2017 California wildfires
- Empire Fire
- Mission Fire
