= Empire Fire =

2017 wildfire in California

Empire Fire (2017)
- Part of the 2017 California wildfires
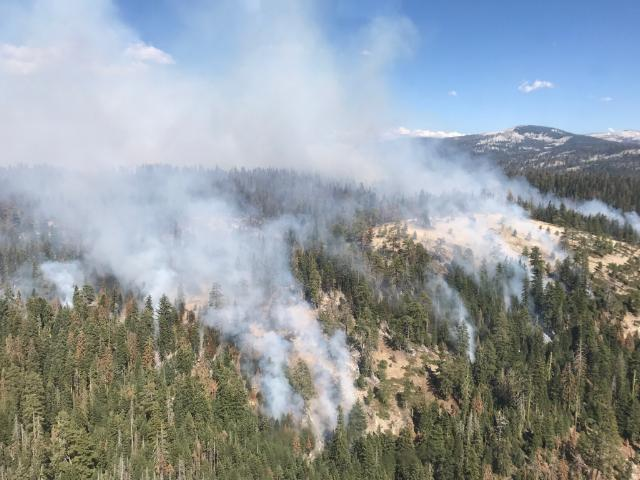
- Empire Fire on August 8, 2017
- Date: August 1, 2017 –; November 27, 2017
- Location: Yosemite National Park, California, United States
- Coordinates: 37.644°N 119.618°W

Statistics
- Burned area: 8,094 acres (33 km^{2})

Ignition
- Cause: Lightning/Natural

Map
- Location of fire in California.

The Empire Fire was a wildfire that burned in Yosemite National Park in California in the United States. The fire was reported on August 1, 2017 and was caused by lightning. It burned 8,094 acres (33 km^{2}), before it was fully contained on November 27. The fire affected recreational activities in the national park.

== Progression ==
The Empire Fire was reported on August 1, 2017 at 8:45 AM. It is located east of Badger Pass Ski Area and next to Bridalveil Creek Campground in Yosemite National Park. The fire was naturally caused, possibly by lightning. It was fueled by red fir timber, dormant brush, green leaf manzanita, chinquapin brush, and dead and down material.

On November 27, the fire was reported to be 100% contained.

== See also ==
- Railroad Fire
