= Mount Goethe =

Mountain in California, United States

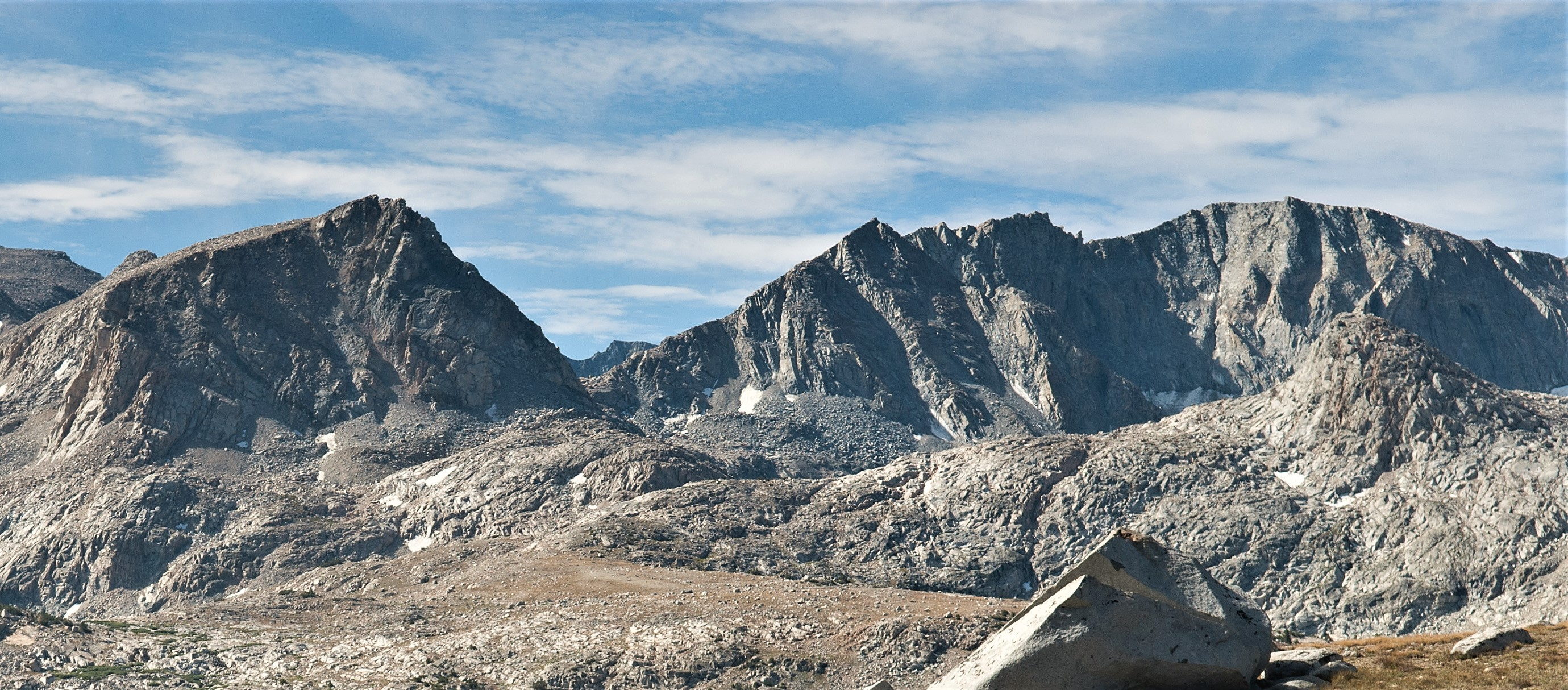
- North aspect of Mount Goethe (right) (Muriel Peak to left)

Highest point
- Elevation: 13,270 ft (4,045 m) NAVD 88
- Prominence: 904 ft (276 m)
- Listing: Sierra Peaks Section
- Coordinates: 37°12′22″N 118°42′08″W

Geography
- Location within California
- Location: Fresno County, California, USA
- Parent range: Glacier Divide, Sierra Nevada
- Topo map: USGS Mount Darwin

Climbing
- First ascent: July 6, 1933, by David Brower and George Rockwood
- Easiest route: Hike, class 1

Mount Goethe is a summit in Fresno County, California, in the United States. With an elevation of 13,270 feet (4,045 m), Mount Goethe is the 96th highest summit in the state of California.

It was named after the German writer Johann Wolfgang von Goethe, the author of Faust.

Mount Goethe was first climbed in 1933 by David Brower and George Rockwood.

== See also ==
- Goethe Glacier
