= Nelder Grove =

Giant sequoia grove in Madera County, California, United States

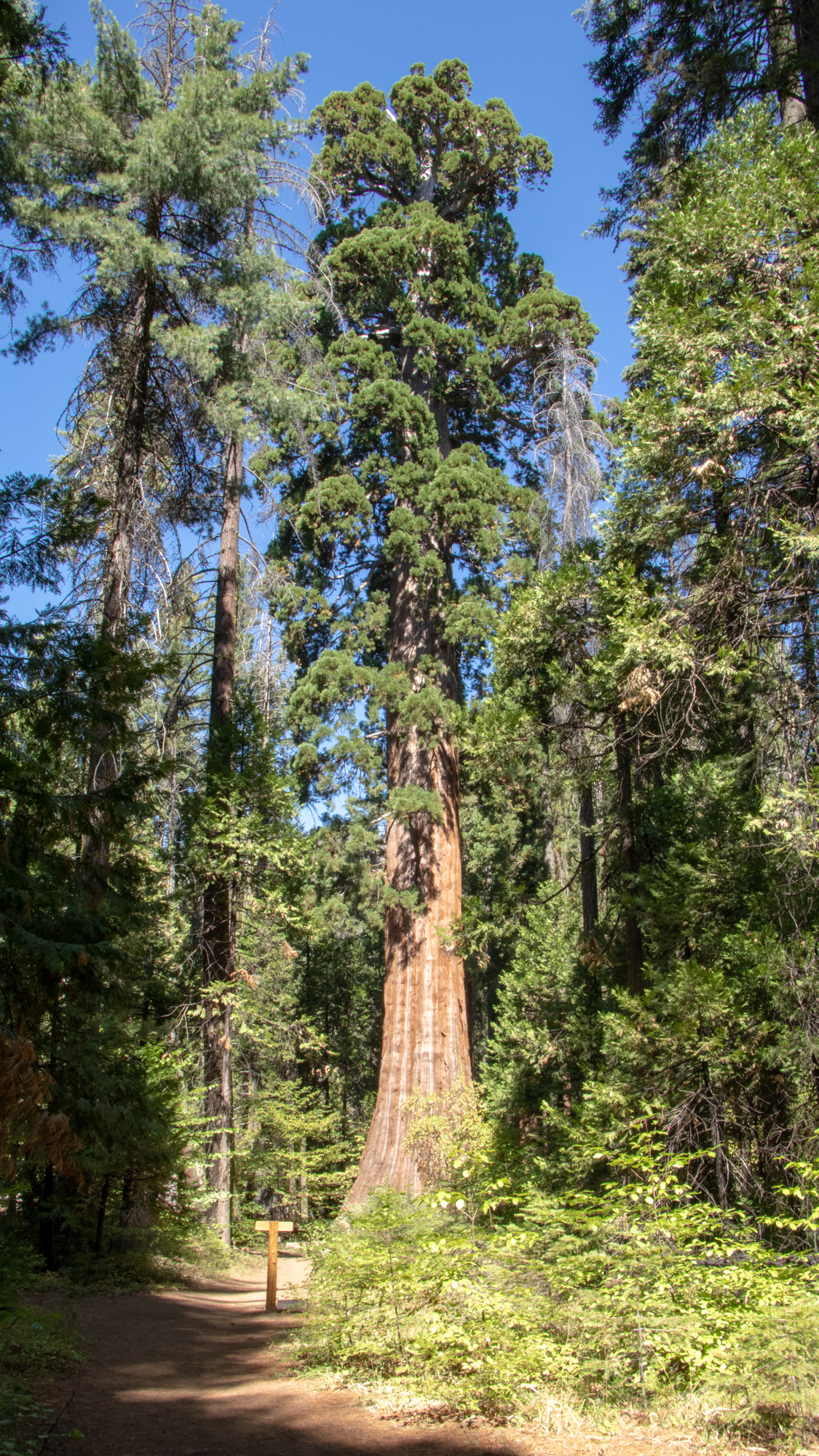
- The Bull Buck Tree of Nelder Grove

- Location within California

Geography
- Location: Madera County, California, United States
- Coordinates: 37°26′24″N 119°35′16″W
- Elevation: 5,200–5,600 ft (1,600–1,700 m)
- Area: 1,540-acre (6.2 km^{2})

Ecology
- Dominant tree species: Sequoiadendron giganteum

Nelder Grove, located in the western Sierra Nevada within the Sierra National Forest in Madera County, California, is a Giant sequoia grove that was formerly known as Fresno Grove. The grove is a 1,540-acre (6.2 km^{2}) tract containing 60 mature Giant Sequoia (Sequoiadendron giganteum) trees, the largest concentration of giant sequoias in the Sierra National Forest. The grove also contains several historical points of interest, including pioneer cabins, giant sequoia stumps left by 19th-century loggers, and the site where the Forest King was felled in 1870 for display.

Before European Americans arrived, Nelder Grove had 400 mature sequoias, but the population has experienced several steep declines since then. About 70% of the mature trees were cut during the late 19th century timber era. Despite federal protection in the 20th century, the sequoias have been further impacted by decades of fire exclusion, with 38 trees lost in the Railroad Fire of 2017. Today, only 60 mature specimens remain in the grove.

In 1928, the Madera Sugar Pine Company transferred the land to the U.S. Forest Service, placing the grove under federal protection.

== Ecology ==
Nelder Grove, a montane forest in the Sierra Nevada, is primarily composed of giant sequoias along with other tree species such as ponderosa pine, white fir, and California incense-cedar. The sequoias in Nelder Grove exhibit a low level of genetic diversity, unusual even for their species. Despite its proximity, just 4.3 mi (6.9 km) from Mariposa Grove, there's no evidence of genetic exchange between the two populations. This genetic isolation heightens Nelder Grove's vulnerability to climate change, underscoring its conservation importance.

The grove also supports rare plant species, including the mountain-lady slipper orchid and the veined water lichen. Its wildlife includes black bear, mule deer, long-tailed weasel, raccoon, gray squirrel, chipmunk, and flying squirrels.

== History ==
=== Native people ===
Human occupation of Nelder Grove dates back approximately 15,000 years. Historically, the area served as a seasonal hub for the Mono and Miwok tribes during their trans-Sierra travels. Other tribes, including the Dumma, Heuchi, Chuckchansi, Chowchillas, Paiute, Kechayi, and Dalinchi, also traveled through the region. Artifacts such as mortar holes, which were used to grind acorns into flour, are evidence of this longstanding human presence.

=== Exploration and naming ===
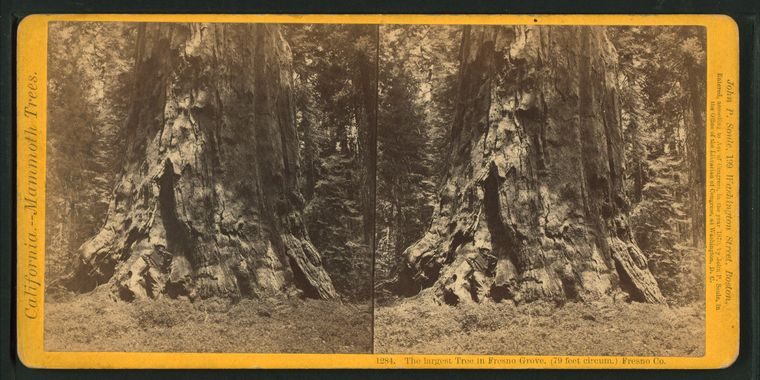
Nelder Tree, 1870.

In July 1858, conservationist Galen Clark formally discovered Nelder Grove, naming it Fresno Grove due to its location in Fresno County and proximity to the headwaters of the Fresno River. However, a later discovery in Robert Eccleston's diary revealed that the Mariposa Battalion had already passed through the grove in 1851 during the Mariposa War, a discovery that had not been publicized at the time.

The grove is now named for John A. Nelder, known as the "Hermit of the Fresno Forest" by John Muir. Nelder, who came to California during the 1849 gold rush, filed a homestead claim for 165 acres within the grove in 1874 and built a cabin near its largest tree the following year. Muir wrote about Nelder and the grove for The Atlantic Monthly in 1878, later including it in his book Our National Parks.

Since '49 he had wandered over most of the Sierra, sinking innumerable prospect holes like a sailor making soundings, digging new channels for streams, sifting gold-sprinkled boulder and gravel beds with unquenchable energy, life's noon the meanwhile passing unnoticed into late afternoon shadows. Then, health and gold gone, the game played and lost, like a wounded deer creeping into this forest solitude, he awaits the sundown call.

John Nelder was killed in 1889 when a fire consumed his cabin. His son inherited his estate and deeded it to the Madera Flume and Trading Company in 1892.

=== Timber era ===
Between 1880 and 1892, the Madera Flume and Trading Company felled 277 giant sequoias in Nelder Grove, each more than four feet in diameter. Other species, including sugar pine, ponderosa pine, white fir, and incense-cedar, were also harvested through clearcutting.

Logs were initially hauled by horse and oxen teams, and later with the aid of a Dolbeer single spool donkey. Because the grove lacked sufficient water for fluming, a 1 mi (1.6 km) gravity tramway was constructed to move logs to the Soquel flume. From there, lumber traveled 52 mi (84 km) to Madera and onward via the Southern Pacific Railroad.

By 1897, the mill’s surrounding area had been logged out, and the last sequoia in Nelder Grove was cut.

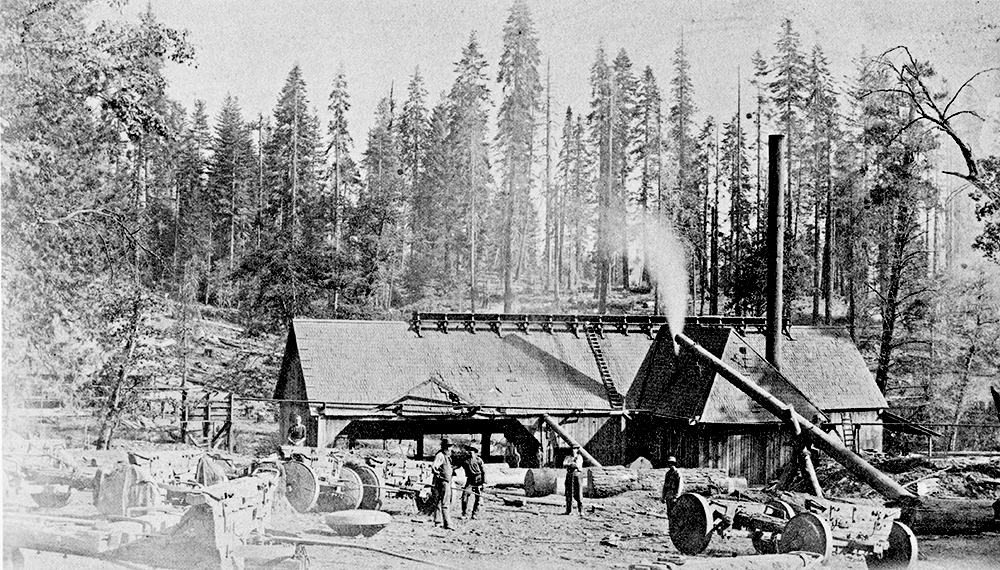
The lumber mill at Nelder Grove around 1881.

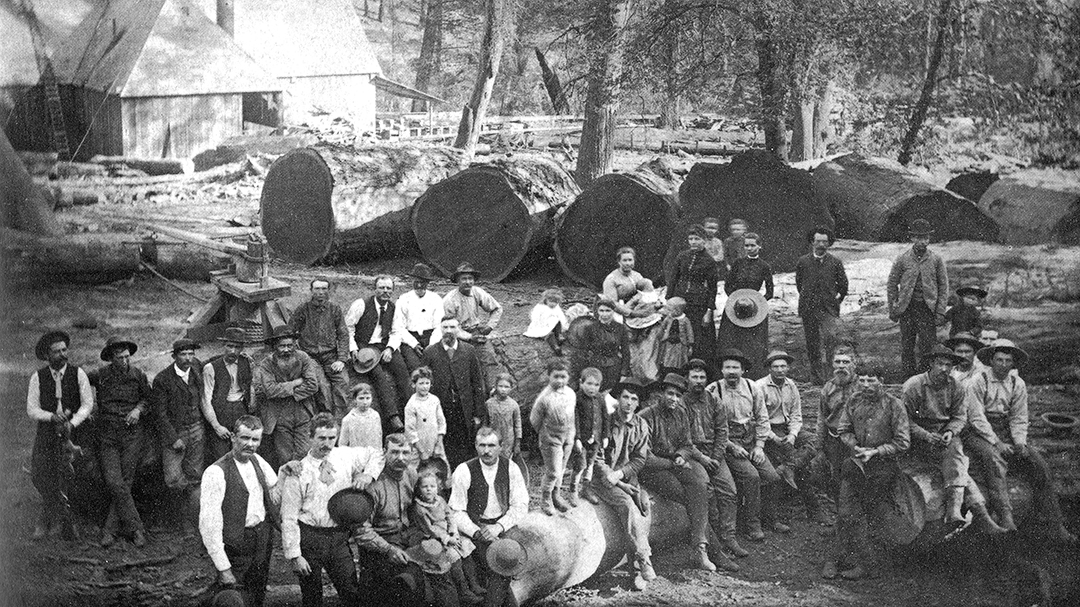
Loggers and their families.

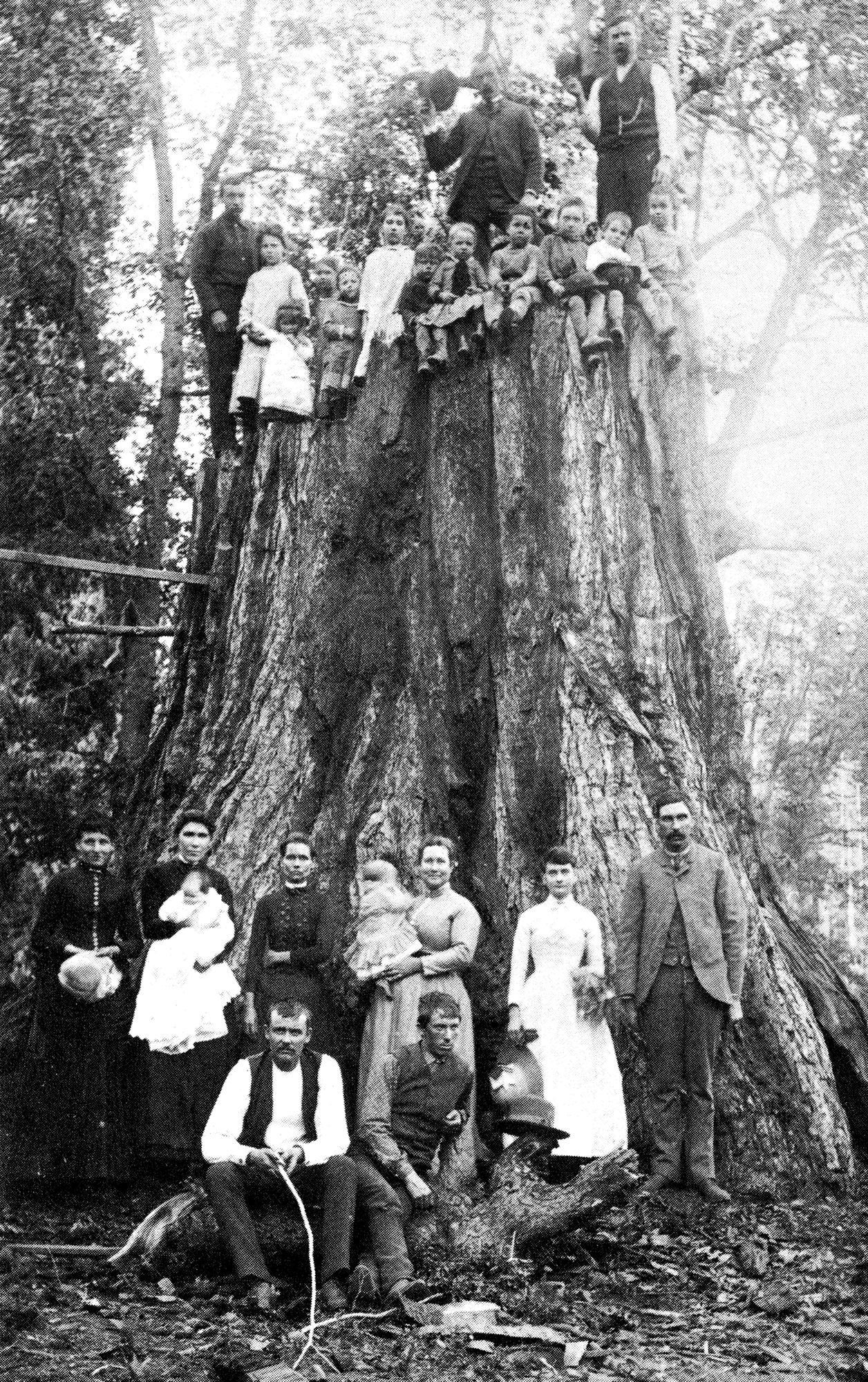
A group portrait portrays the trees' remarkable scale.

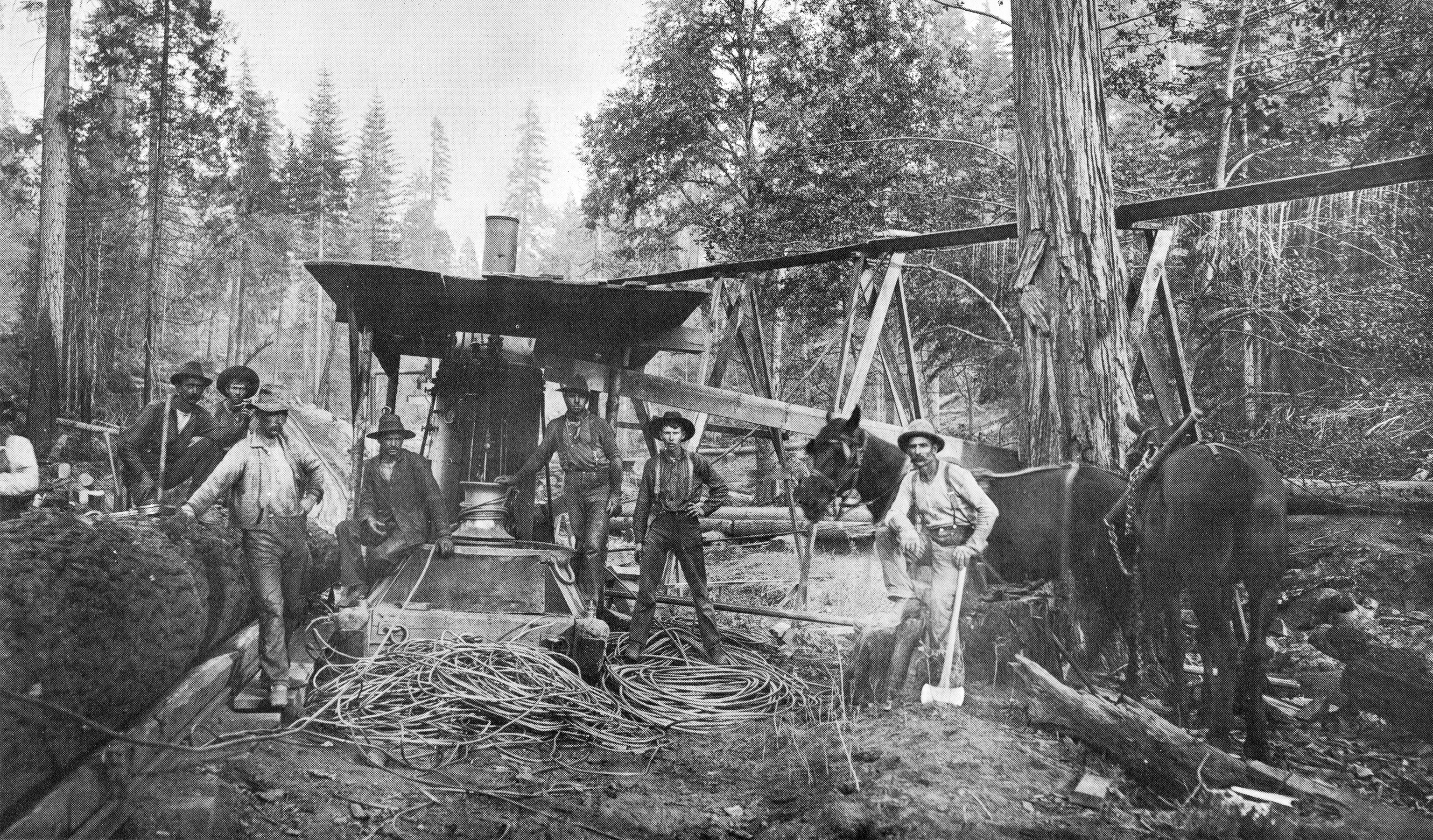
A state-of-the-art Dolbeer single spool donkey sometime after 1881.

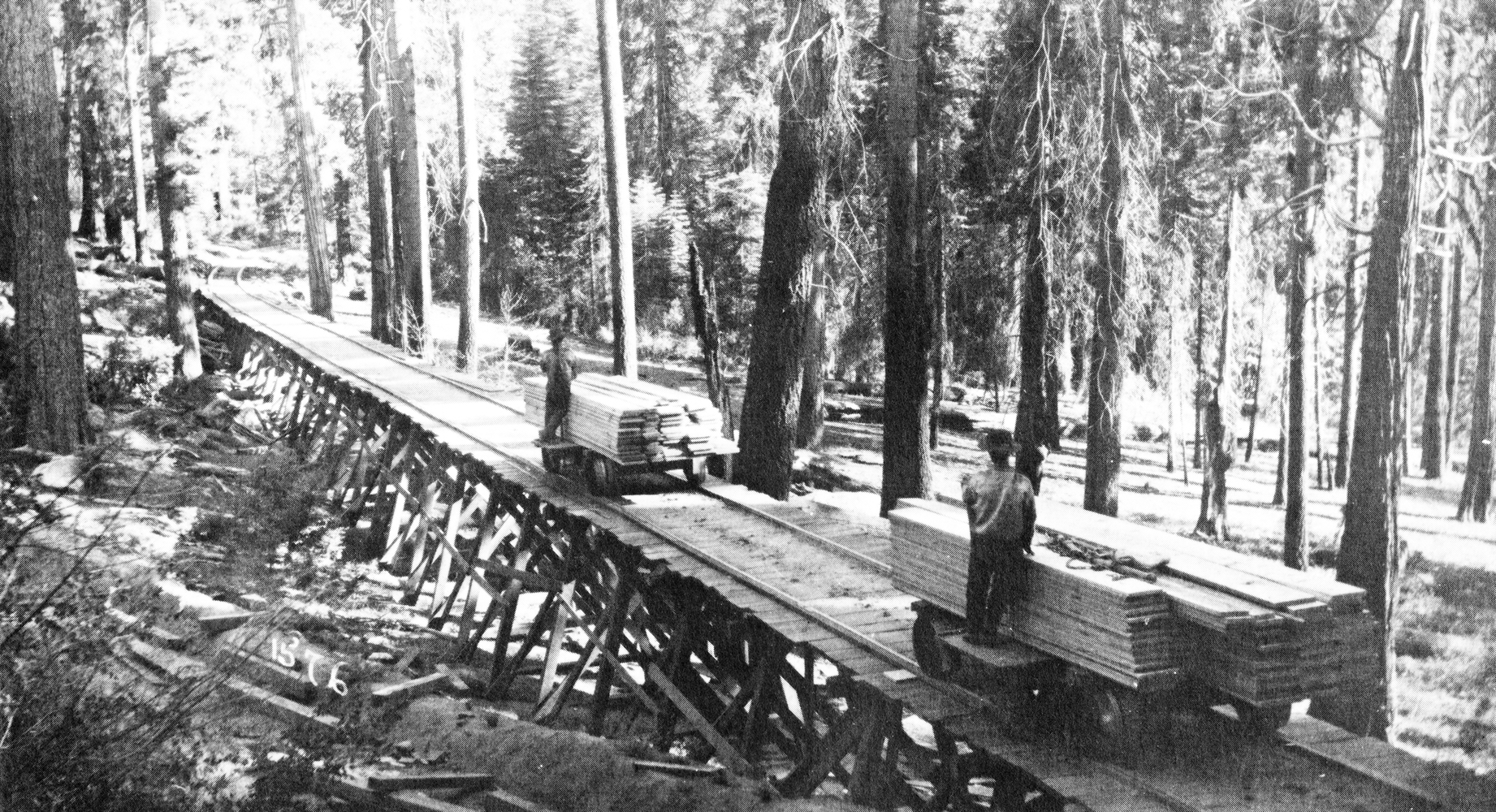
The Nelder Grove Tramway.

== Noteworthy trees ==
The Nelder Grove is home to several giant sequoias that are notable for their size and history.

Tree Name	Description	Volume	Height	Circumference	Age
Nelder	The largest tree in the grove, named after homesteader John Nelder who built a cabin near its base in 1875. It is the 22nd largest giant sequoia in the world.	34,993 cubic feet (990.9 m^{3})			
Forest King	This giant sequoia was cut down in 1870 and toured the United States as an exhibition tree. The stump was rediscovered in 2003.				
Bull Buck	Named after the felling foreman of the logging camp or "boss of the woods." Once believed to be the world's second-largest tree, now ranked 43rd on the list of largest giant sequoias.	27,383 cuft (775.4 m3)	75.01 metres (246.1 ft)	25.65 metres (84.2 ft)	2724 years
Old Grandad	The tree, perched on a hill, is dead with a hollow top and has four prominent fire scars.				
Old Forester	The tallest tree in the Nelder Grove campground area, named after Walter Puhn, a National Forest Supervisor in the 1960s.		91 metres (299 ft)		
Big Ed	Named after Ed Zerlang, a Soquel Mill foreman and his favorite giant sequoia. Reachable by a short trail today.				

== Access ==
Nelder Grove is less accessible compared to the nearby Mariposa Grove, which can be easily reached by paved roads and shuttle buses. Under favorable conditions, visitors can reach Nelder Grove within two hours from Fresno by heading north, or from Yosemite National Park by traveling south on Highway 41 to Road 632, also known as Sky Ranch Road. However, the dirt road leading into the grove can be difficult, with muddy and rutted conditions, and is often impassable due to deep snow during the winter months.

== Hiking and Recreation ==
The Shadow of the Giants National Recreation Trail, located in Nelder Grove, was built in 1965 and designated a National Recreation Trail in 1978. However, the Railroad Fire in 2017 destroyed the trail’s informational panels, bridges, and other infrastructure. As of 2022, the trail remains closed and overgrown with brush.

Additionally, there is a Sierra National Forest campground located at the Nelder Grove which serves as a spot for camping and outdoor activities.

== Structures and Buildings ==
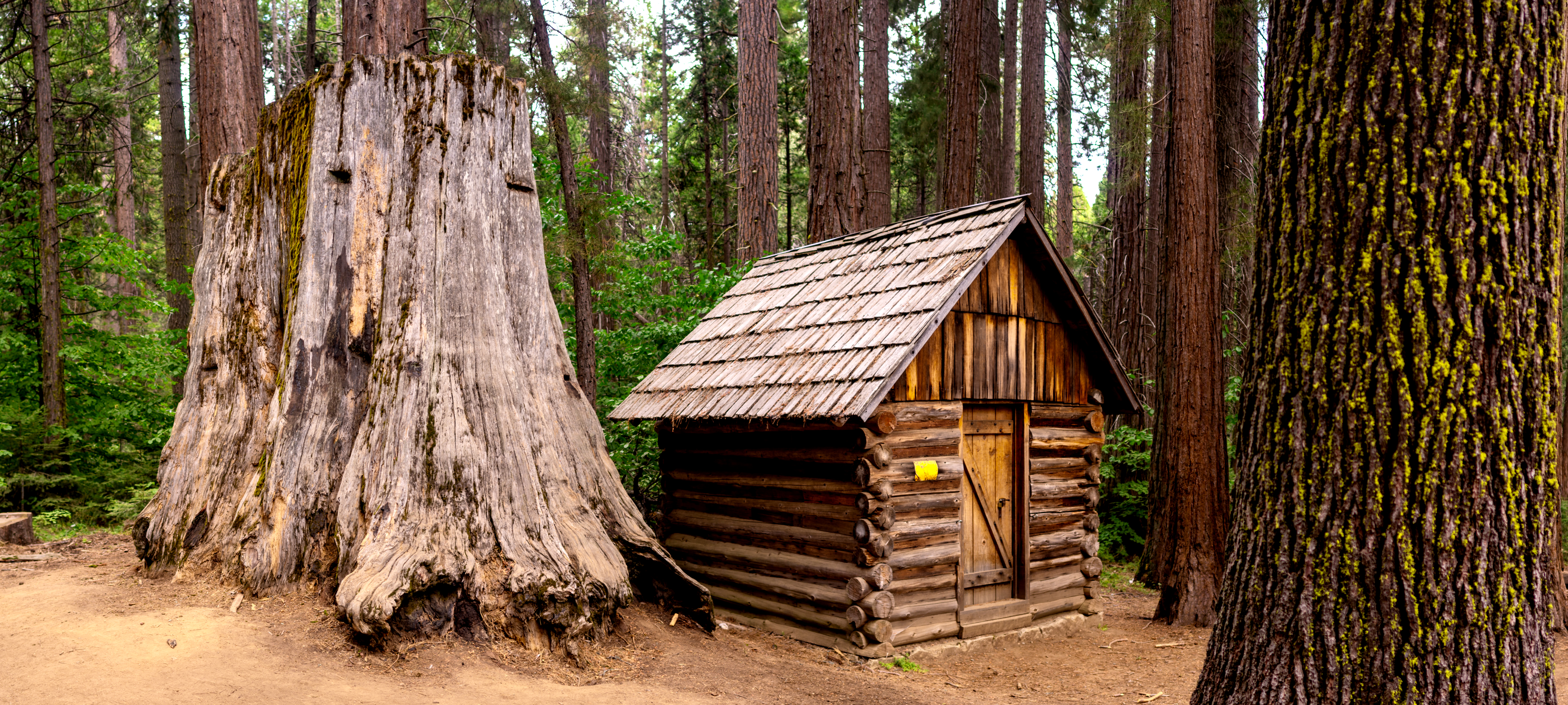
Bildeo Meadow Cabin

The Nelder Grove Interpretive Center features several artifacts from the area's logging era, including two restored log cabins and replicas of traditional logging chutes. These cabins, originally constructed by pioneers in the late 1800s at nearby Bildeo Meadow, were moved to Nelder Grove in the 1980s under a project funded by the National Historic Preservation Act. They are among the oldest structures in the Sierra National Forest.

== Railroad Fire ==
In September 2017, the Railroad Fire swept through much of Nelder Grove, destroying 38 of its giant sequoias and leading to the permanent closure of the popular Shadow of the Giants trail.

Experts attribute the wildfire’s intensity to several factors, including the historic 2011–2017 California drought, which caused significant dieback and stress in giant sequoias. Additionally, a century of fire suppression had led to heavy fuel buildup on the forest floor and dense understory growth, making the blaze more destructive.

Forest monitors had warned of such risks for decades. As early as the 1960s, Madera County discussed acquiring the grove to bypass federal restrictions on timber cutting and prescribed burns in the Sierra National Forest. Despite these warnings, no major preventive actions were taken before the Railroad Fire. “We’d better reduce the fuels, or we’re going to lose this resource,” Paul Rich, a retired 33-year veteran of the U.S. Forest Service, warned in 2000.

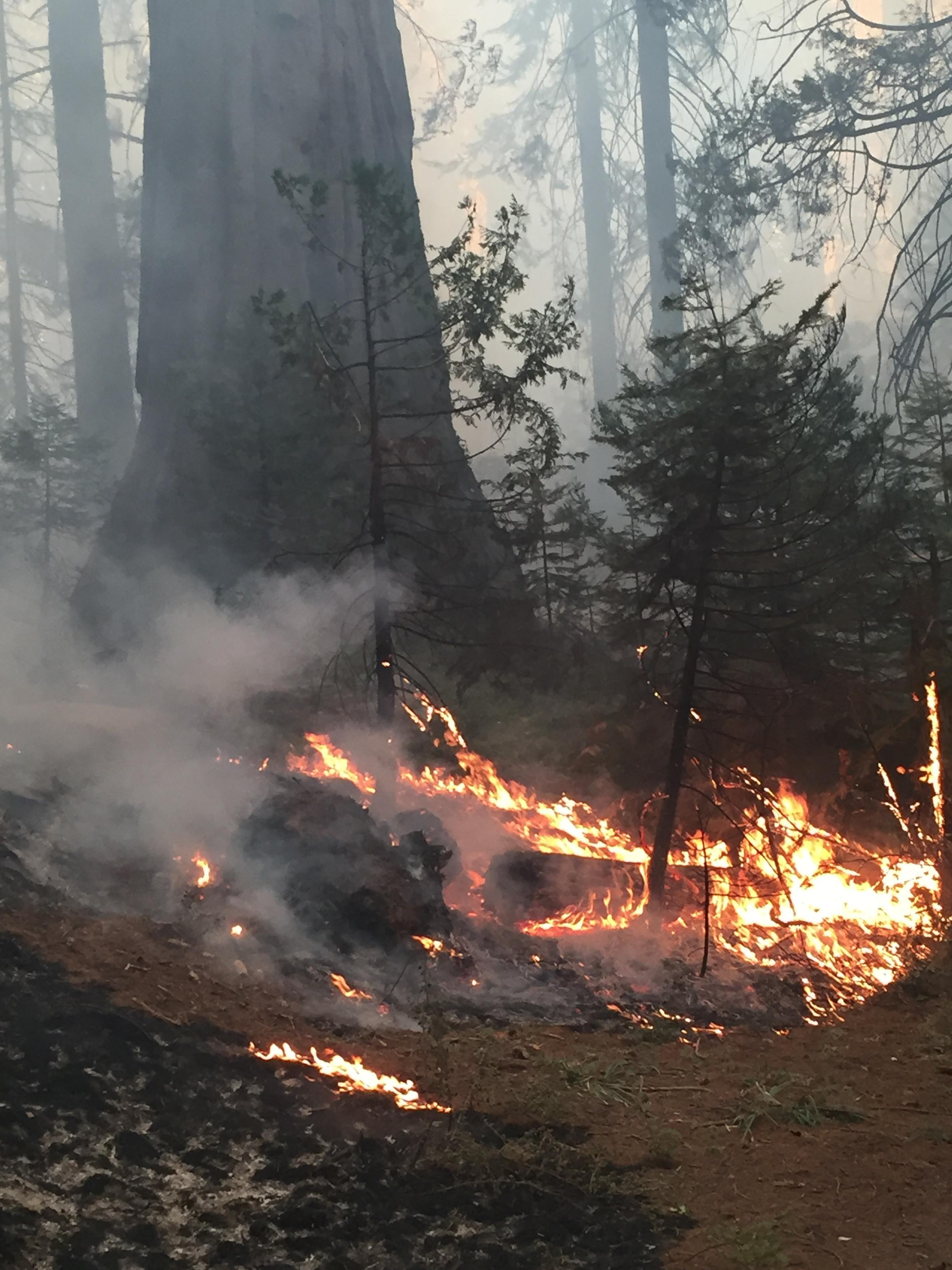
Fire burning in Nelder Grove on September 10, 2017.

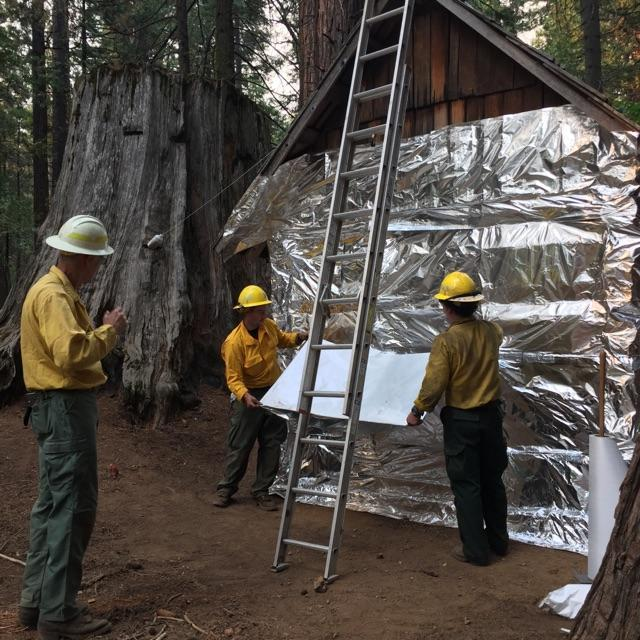
Resource Advisors (READ) from the National Park Service apply fire-resistant wrap to a historic Bildeo cabin.

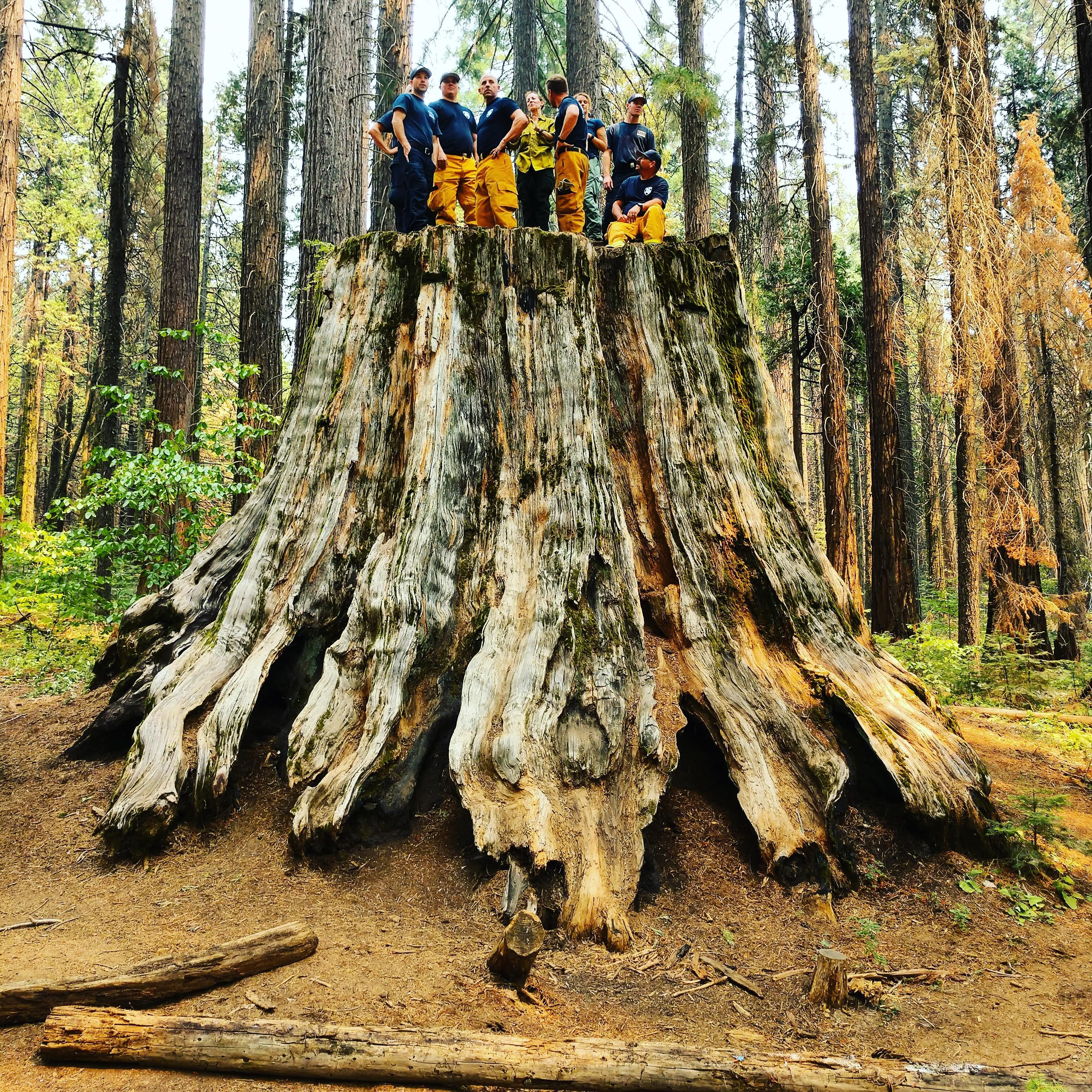
Firefighters pose atop a giant sequoia stump.

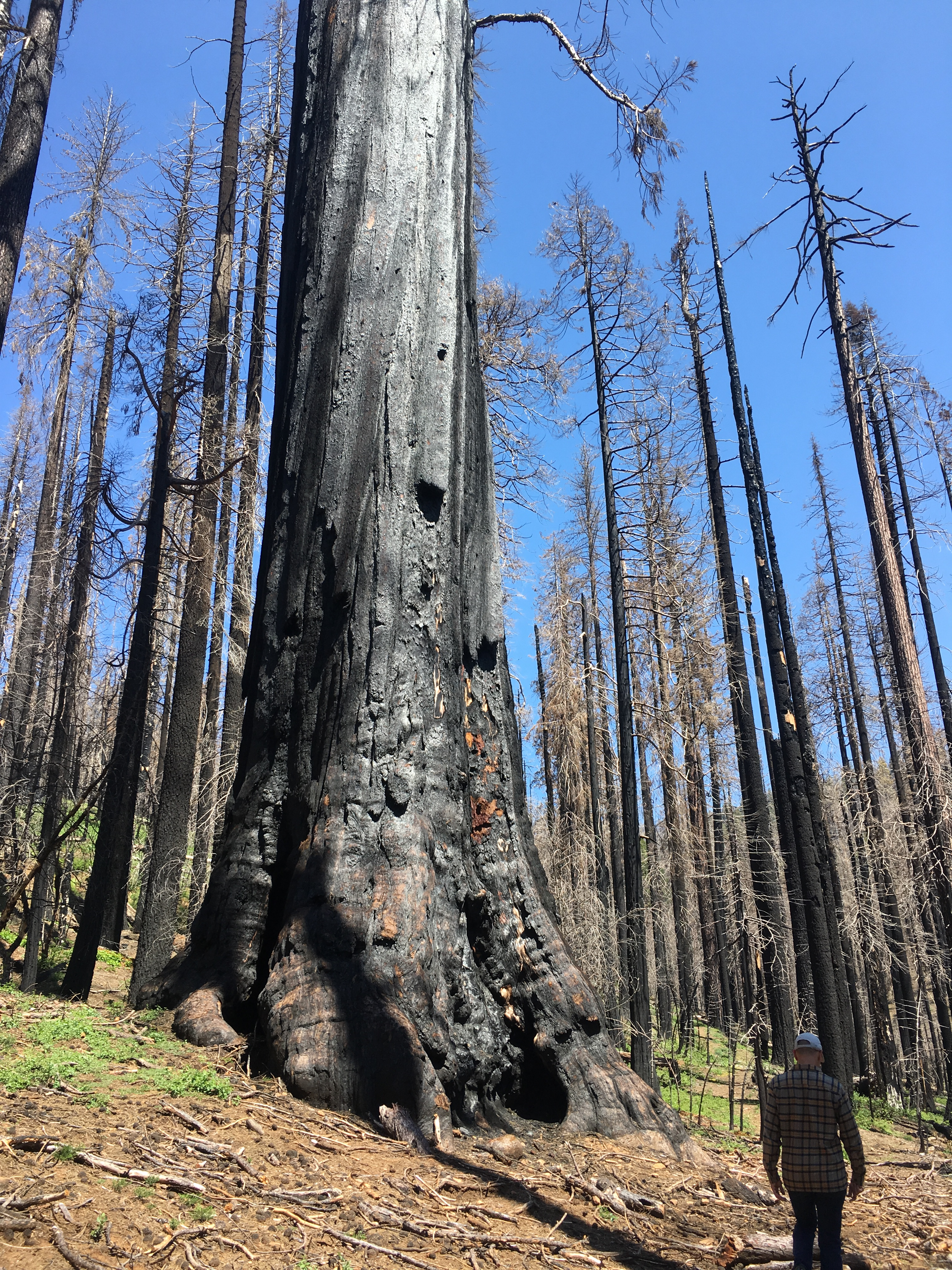
Portions of Nelder Grove became a snag forest after exposure to high intensity wildfire.

== Protection and Restoration Efforts ==
Following the Railroad Fire, researchers reported a strong correlation between fire severity and the density, growth, and dominance of new giant sequoia seedlings. The study found that high-severity fire can promote substantial natural regeneration in giant sequoia groves.

In July 2022, the U.S. Forest Service approved an expedited plan to reduce hazardous fuels in Nelder Grove. Officials cited earlier fuels treatments in nearby Mariposa Grove prior to the Washburn Fire as evidence of their effectiveness. The project established 100-foot protective buffers around 42 mature giant sequoias.

Nelder Grove reopened January 1, 2026, after fuels reduction treatments across nearly 700 acres completed at a cost of $11.5 million.

== See also ==
- List of giant sequoia groves
- Mariposa Grove - the nearest neighboring giant sequoia grove.
- Converse Basin Grove - a giant sequoia grove that was logged extensively in the 19th and early 20th centuries.
