= Sierra National Forest =

National forest in California, United States

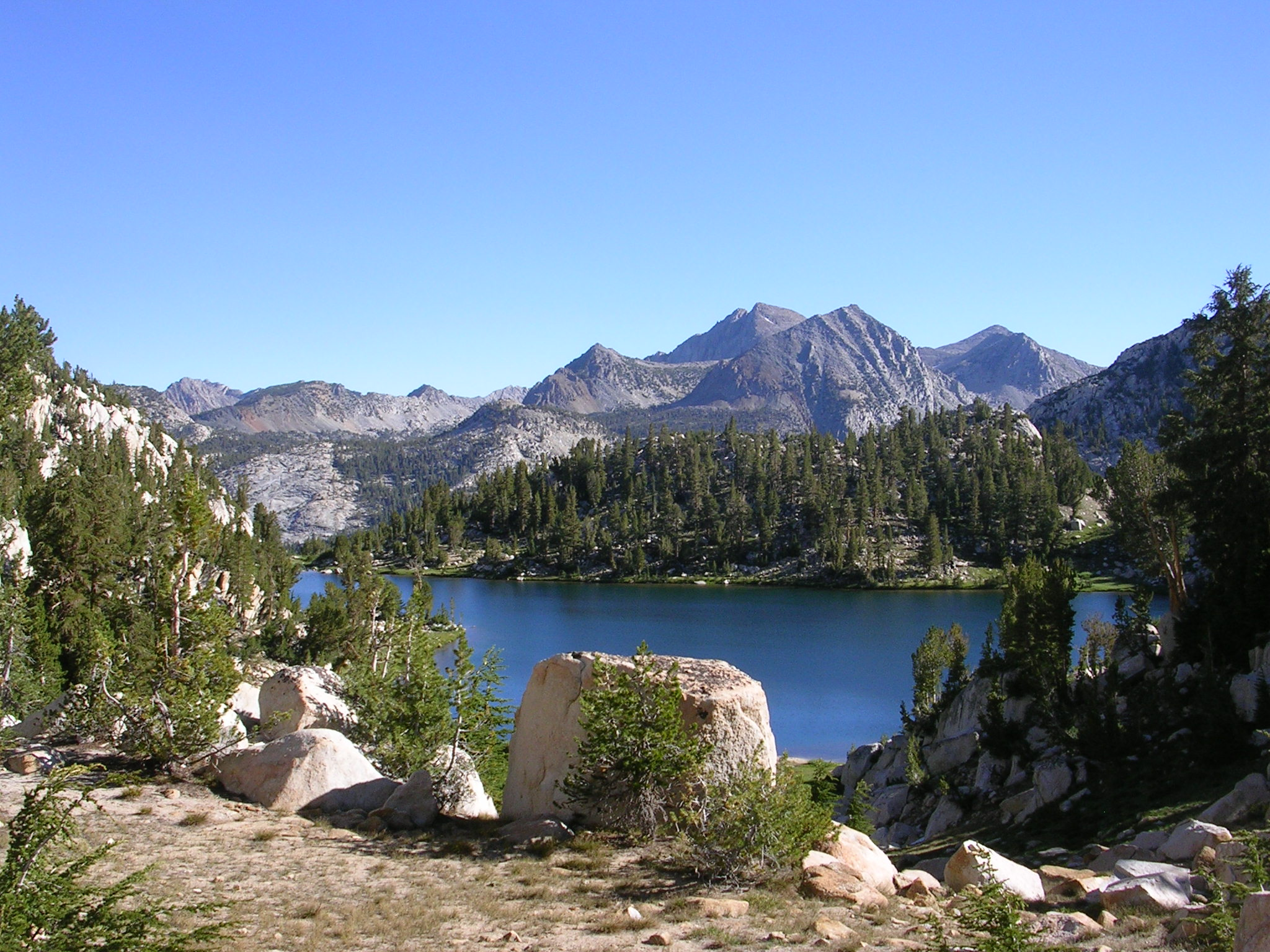
- Lake of the Lone Indian, John Muir Wilderness
- Interactive map of Sierra National Forest
- Location: Sierra Nevada, Central California
- Nearest city: Oakhurst, California
- Coordinates: 37°25′N 119°10′W
- Area: 1,300,000 acres (5,300 km^{2})
- Established: 1893; 133 years ago
- Governing body: U.S. Forest Service
- Website: Sierra National Forest

Sierra National Forest is a U.S. national forest located on the western slope of the central Sierra Nevada in California, bounded on the northwest by Yosemite National Park and on the south by Kings Canyon National Park. The forest is known for its mountain scenery and beautiful lakes. Forest headquarters are located in Clovis, California. There are local ranger district offices in North Fork and Prather.

== History ==
Sierra National Forest was the second National Forest created in California and the largest at the time. It covered over six million acres (24,000 km^{2}) of the Sierra Nevada and was about four times the average area of typical California National Forests. Originally it embraced parts of eight counties from Tuolumne on the north to Kern on the south and Mono and Inyo on the east. Initially its name was descriptive, but later when the Sierra was divided into different units this was no longer the case.

President Benjamin Harrison proclaimed the Sierra Forest Reserve on February 14, 1893. Four years later the south half became a separate unit and was named Sierra South during the "forest reserves" era. This designation was dropped after the administrative transition to the National Forests on March 4, 1907. On July 1, 1908, the Sequoia National Forest, and Kings Canyon and Sequoia National Parks were established from this south portion of Sierra National Forest. Eastern portions of Sierra National Forest became the Inyo and Toiyabe National Forests; northern portions were used for Yosemite National Park and the Stanislaus National Forest.

The Sierra National Forest contains artifacts dating back over 10,000 years, mainly from indigenous people before written records started about 150 years ago. Around the late 1700s, the Fresno River marked the area between the Southern Sierra Miwok and the Chukchansi Yokuts, with the Western Mono living near today's Bass Lake. The borders between these groups were not clear-cut, showing that the Miwok, Yokuts, and Mono territories often overlapped.

The first timber sale on a California National Forest took place in the Sierra NF by the United States General Land Office in 1899.

== Geography ==
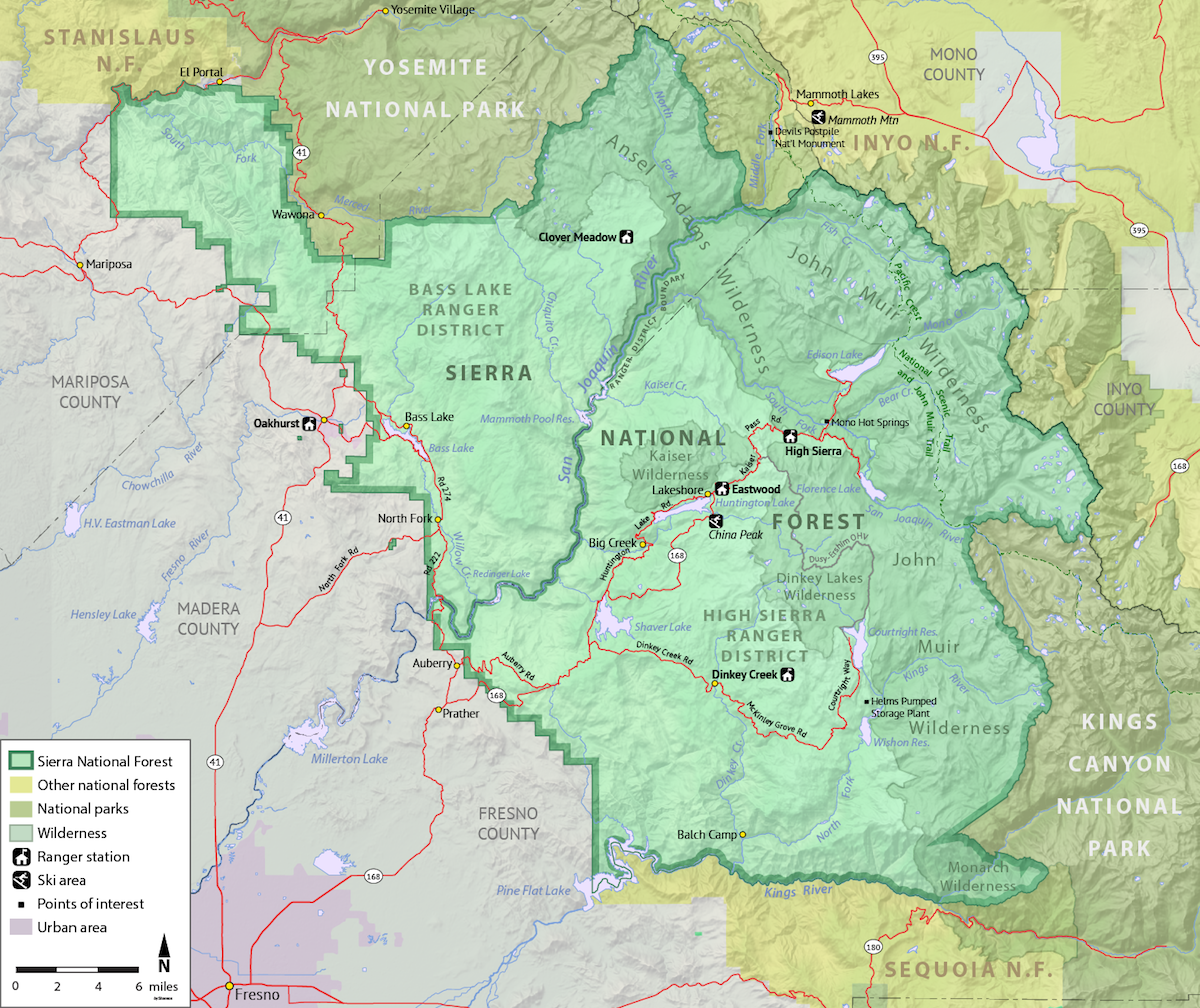
Area map

Sierra National Forest covers, in descending order of forestland area, the eastern portions of Fresno, Madera, and Mariposa counties, adjacent to the southern part of Yosemite National Park. It includes more than 1,300,000 acres (2,000 sq mi; 5,300 km^{2}), at altitudes ranging from 900 to 13,986 feet (274 to 4,263 m) in elevation. The terrain includes rolling, oak-covered foothills, heavily forested middle elevation slopes and the tundra landscape of the High Sierra.

=== Boundaries ===
The forest's boundary starts clockwise at the intersections of the Merced River, Sweetwater Creek and HWY 140, then moves east following the Merced River canyon to the border with Yosemite National Park near El Portal. Then it follows the park's southern boundary until it reaches the Inyo National forest near Electra Peak. From there it travels south to its border with Kings Canyon National Park near Mount Goethe. It follows the park's northern border, then heads south to the Kings River near Deer Canyon. From there it moves down the Kings River canyon east; south of the river is the Sequoia National Forest. When it reaches Pine Flat Lake near Trimmer, it turns north towards Tollhouse and continues on to Auberry. From there Sierra National Forest moves on to North Fork, then west to form a small finger towards Coarsegold. Finally, the boundary travels north to Yosemite Forks and moves west towards Miami Mountain, then heads north to return to the Merced River.

== Recreation ==
The forest includes a number of scenic attractions, including Fresno Dome and Nelder Grove. Several reservoirs offer fishing and boating, including Bass Lake, Shaver Lake, Wishon Reservoir, and Courtright Reservoir. There are numerous hiking opportunities in wilderness areas: Ansel Adams, John Muir, Dinkey Lakes, Kaiser, and Monarch. There is also a ski resort, China Peak, that operates under a special use permit. Great sailing opportunities exist at Huntington Lake.

== Administration ==
The Sierra National Forest is located within the Pacific Southwest region of the US Forest Service. The forest is divided into three ranger districts:

Bass Lake Ranger District is north and west of the San Joaquin River. Its Ranger District office is located at 57003 Road 225 North Fork, California, 93643. The district includes 36 camp sites, 17 picnic sites, 7 Off Highway Vehicle Trails, and 10 trails. It includes the Forest Service Offices of Oakhurst (40343 Hwy 41, Oakhurst, California 93644), and the Clover Meadow Wilderness Office.

High Sierra Ranger District is south and east of the San Joaquin River; it has its Ranger District office out of 29688 Auberry Rd P.O. Box 559 Prather, California 93651. This district contains 30 camp sites, 11 picnic sites, and 13 Off Highway Vehicle Trails. It also includes the following Forest Service Offices; the High Sierra visitor information station near Mono Hot Springs on the Kaiser Pass Road, Eastwood visitor information center at Hwy 168 and Kaiser Pass Road at Huntington Lake, Dinkey Creek visitor information center on Dinkey Creek Road near the Dinkey Creek Campground,

Supervisor's Office (an administrative Unit) contains the Sierra National Forest Supervisor's office (1600 Tollhouse Rd Clovis, California, 93611); the Yosemite Sierra Visitor Bureau (40343 Highway 41, Oakhurst, California 93644); and the Fresno Air Attack Base which is co-located with the Sierra National Forest Emergency Communications Center (2307 and 2309 N Clovis Ave, Fresno, California 93727) at Fresno Yosemite International Airport.

In addition, the forest has a close relationship with the Teakettle Experimental Forest which is deep inside the forest and the San Joaquin Experimental Range which is just outside the forest boundaries. They both fall in the Pacific Southwest Research Station which is based in Berkeley, California.

== Ecology ==
The ecology of the National Forest is typical for the western side of the southern Sierra Nevada: distributions of species are largely governed by climate, which is strongly dependent on altitude. The ecology can be described by biotic zones, which are marked by either a tree indicator species, or by a lack of trees. The biotic zones include the foothill woodland zone from 1,000 to 3,000 feet (300 to 910 m) (interior live oak), the lower montane zone from 3,000 to 7,000 feet (910 to 2,130 m) (Ponderosa pine), the upper montane zone from 7,000 to 9,000 feet (2,100 to 2,700 m) (lodgepole pine/red fir), the subalpine zone from 9,000 to 9,500 feet (2,700 to 2,900 m) (whitebark pine), and the alpine zone from 9,500 feet (2,900 m) (above the tree line).

Some 383,000 acres (598 sq mi; 1,550 km^{2}) of the forest are old growth, containing lodgepole pine (Pinus contorta) and red fir (Abies magnifica).

== National monument proposal ==
A campaign to designate the national forest as a national monument was begun in 2015. The proposal for the 1,400,000-acre (5,700 km^{2}) Range of Light National Monument would prevent new mining operations and phase out logging and grazing, resulting in a continuous protected area linking Yosemite, Sequoia, and Kings Canyon national parks. Former Sequoia National Park ranger Deanna Lynn Wulff founded the organization Unite the Parks to campaign for the monument's establishment. The proposal has been endorsed by numerous local businesses and organizations, a group of 200 scientists, the California Democratic Party, Democratic National Committee, Sierra Club, and the Coalition to Protect America's National Parks. The protection of old-growth trees would contribute to the 30 by 30 initiative. It is opposed by Congressman Tom McClintock and the logging industry.

In December 2022, Congressmembers Jackie Speier and Jerry McNerney introduced a bill that would establish Range of Light National Monument comprising the entirety of Sierra National Forest and the San Joaquin Gorge managed by the Bureau of Land Management. The new national monument would be administered by the National Park Service, which would manage land for conservation rather than multiple-use.

Unite the Parks has also led a lawsuit to prevent logging in fisher habitat.

== See also ==
- List of national forests of the United States
- Creek Fire
- Ferguson Fire
- Railroad Fire
