= Bass Lake, California =

Census-designated place in Madera County, California

- Census-designated place
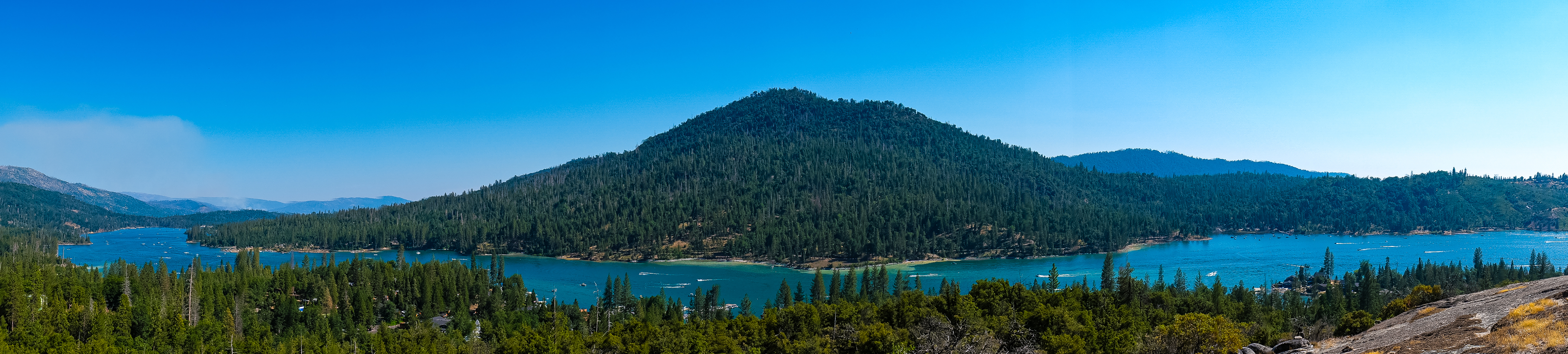
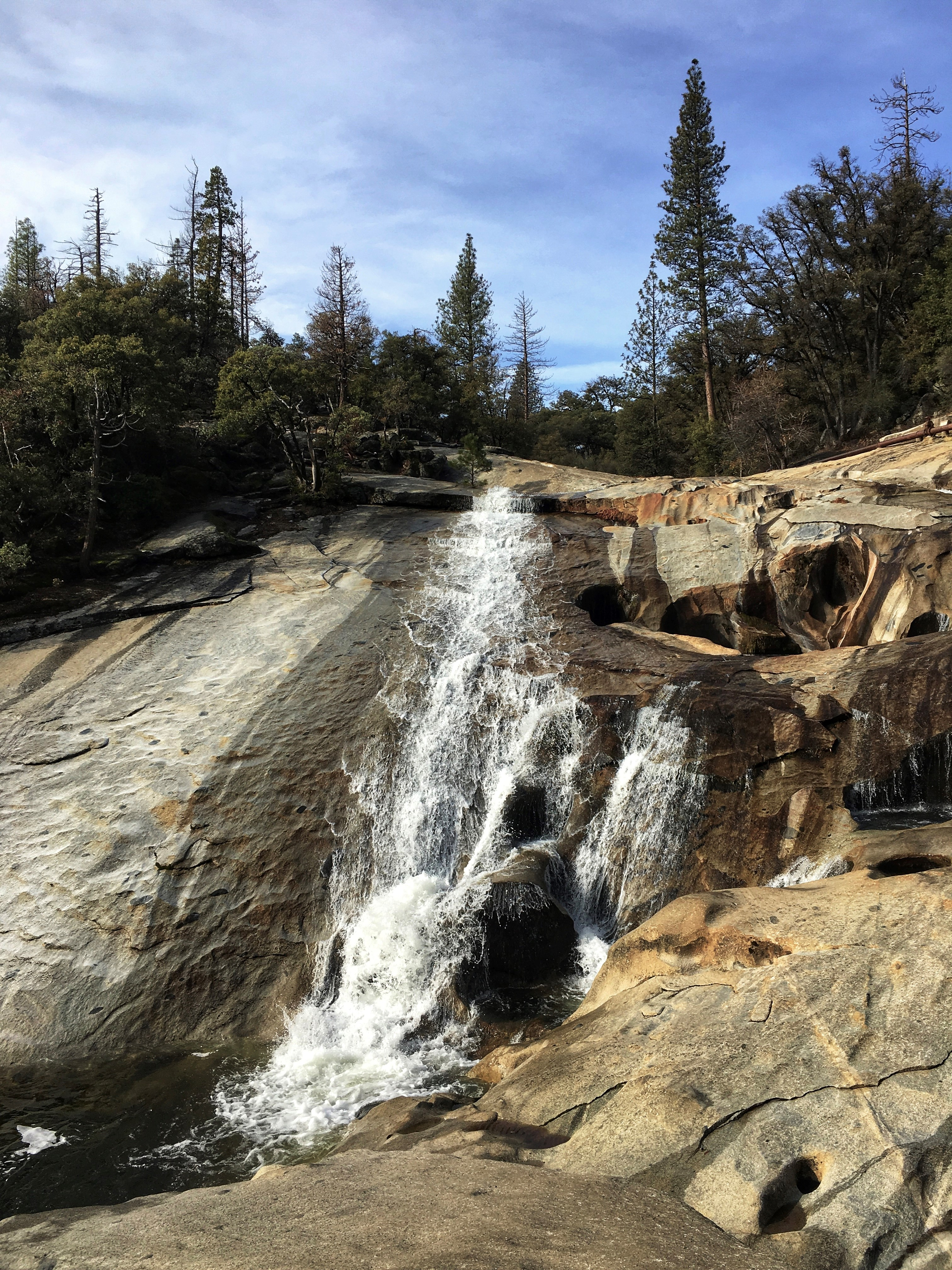
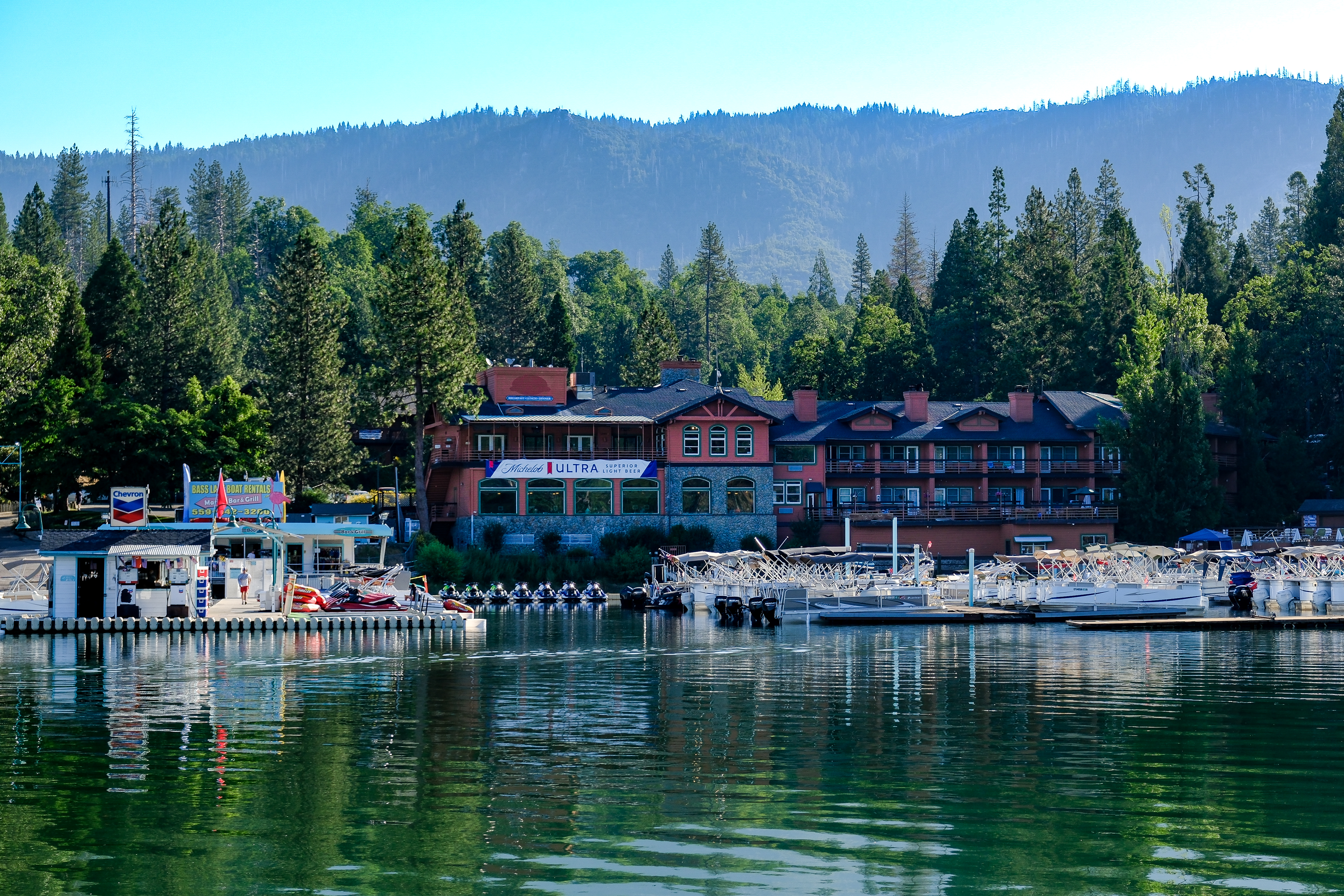
- Goat Mountain as seen from Glass Rock Angel Falls on Willow Creek Ducey's on the Lake and Pines Marina

- Location in Madera County, California

- Location in California Bass Lake (the United States)
- Coordinates: 37°19′41″N 119°34′00″W
- Country: United States
- State: California
- County: Madera
- Named for: Bass Lake

Area
  - Total: 2.488 sq mi (6.44 km^{2})
  - Land: 1.882 sq mi (4.87 km^{2})
  - Water: 0.606 sq mi (1.57 km^{2}) 24.36%
- Elevation: 3,415 ft (1,041 m)

Population (2020)
  - Total: 575
  - Density: 306/sq mi (118/km^{2})
- Time zone: UTC−8 (Pacific)
  - Summer (DST): UTC−7 (PDT)
- ZIP Code: 93604 and 93669
- Area code: 559
- FIPS code: 06-04198
- GNIS feature IDs: 256579 (populated place); 2628709 (CDP)

Bass Lake is a census-designated place (CDP) in Madera County, California, United States, within the Sierra National Forest. The community surrounds Bass Lake, a reservoir on Willow Creek approximately 14 miles (23 km) south of the southern entrance to Yosemite National Park. As of the 2020 census, the CDP had a population of 575.

The area was historically inhabited by the Mono people and later developed around logging and hydroelectric power. During the 20th century, Bass Lake became a recreational and seasonal residential community, with resorts, campgrounds, boating, and other outdoor recreation centered on the reservoir. The area was also the site of annual Hells Angels gatherings beginning in the 1960s and has been used as a filming location for motion pictures including Leave Her to Heaven and The Great Outdoors.

== Geography ==
Bass Lake is a reservoir on the western slope of the Sierra Nevada in Madera County, California, at an elevation of 3,370 feet (1,030 m). It was formed by the construction of Crane Valley Dam on North Fork Willow Creek. Other inflows include South Fork Willow Creek, via Brown's Ditch, and Slide, Pines, and Salter creeks. Willow Creek drains the lake toward the San Joaquin River.

The lake is bordered by Malum Ridge to the south, Graham Mountain (6,090 feet (1,860 m)) to the northeast, and Goat Mountain (about 4,975 feet (1,516 m)) to the west.

== Demographics ==
Bass Lake first appeared as a census-designated place in the 2010 census, when it had a population of 527.

Historical population
Census	Pop.	Note	%±
2010	527		—
2020	575		9.1%
U.S. Decennial Census

=== 2020 census ===
At the 2020 census, Bass Lake had a population of 575. The median age was 62.3 years; 10.6% of residents were under age 18 and 45.0% were 65 or older. There were 293 households and 868 housing units, of which 66.2% were vacant.

Racial composition in 2020
Race	Number	Percent
White	481	83.7%
Black or African American	1	0.2%
American Indian and Alaska Native	8	1.4%
Asian	3	0.5%
Native Hawaiian and Other Pacific Islander	1	0.2%
Some other race	16	2.8%
Two or more races	65	11.3%
Hispanic or Latino (of any race)	68	11.8%

The estimated median household income was $152,083 according to the American Community Survey.

== Climate ==
Bass Lake has a hot-summer Mediterranean climate (Köppen Csa), with hot, dry summers and cool, wet winters. The community spans hardiness zones 8b and 9a.

The area is also affected by Mono winds, downslope wind events that occur between October and April and are most common in December and January. A Mono wind event in January 2021 felled hundreds of trees and damaged structures around Bass Lake.

== Natural environment ==
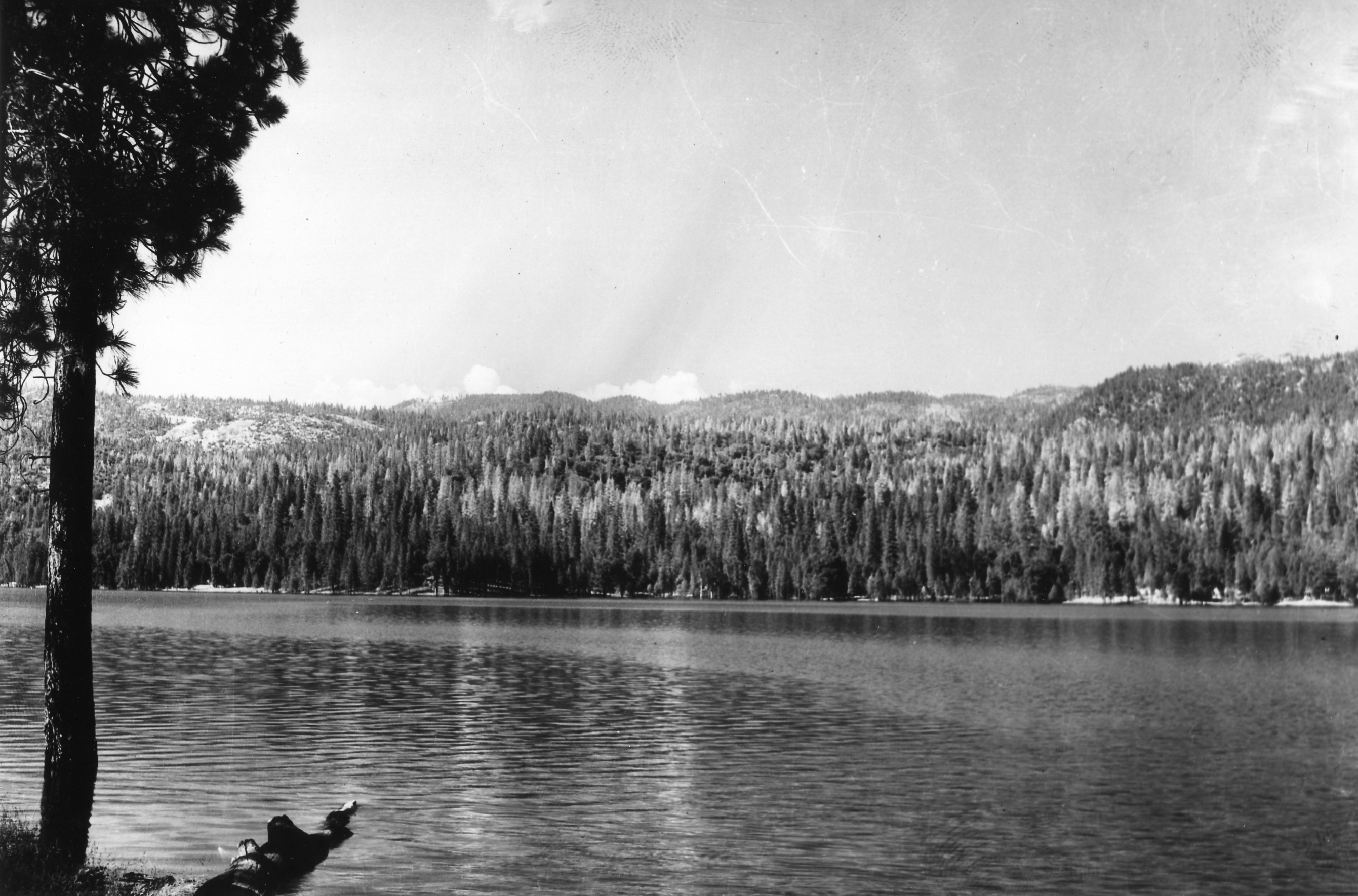
Pine beetle infestation in 1933.

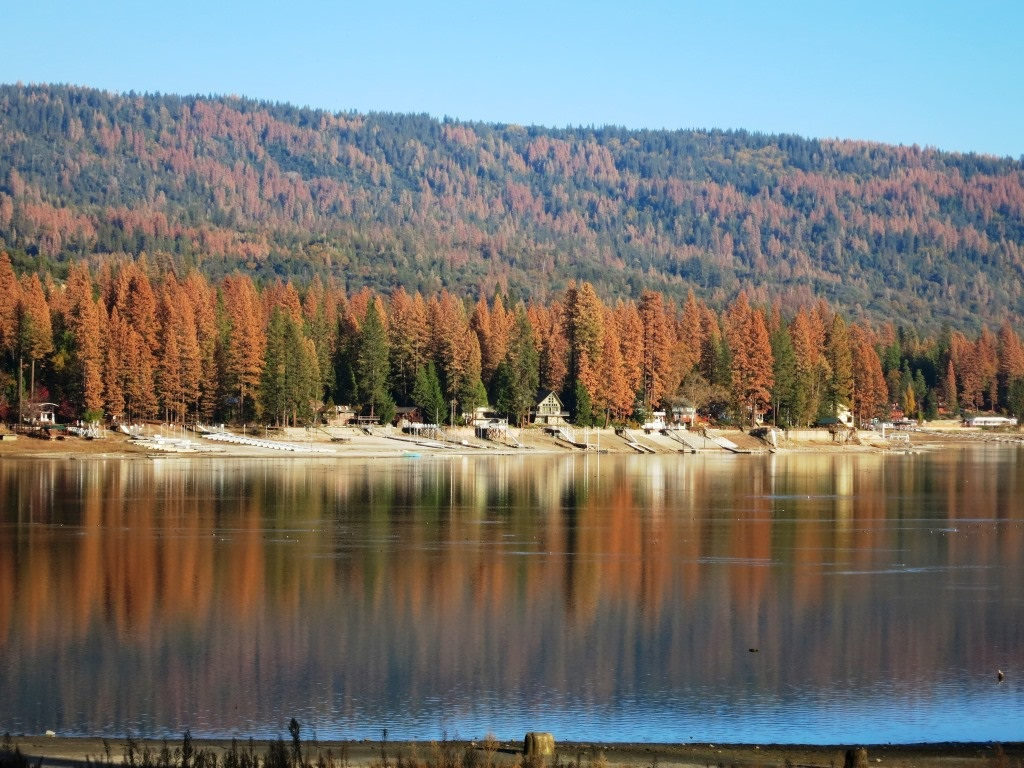
Beetle infestation in 2015.

The forests surrounding Bass Lake provide habitat for wildlife including American black bears, mule deer, bald eagles, and great blue herons. The area's earlier name, Crane Valley, originated when early settlers mistook great blue herons for cranes.

Pine beetle outbreaks have affected forests around Bass Lake since at least the early 20th century. Control efforts targeting western and mountain pine beetles were undertaken in the area during the 1960s. Drought and beetle mortality again affected the surrounding forest during the 2010s. The 2014 Courtney Fire burned approximately 80 acres near the community, after which the U.S. Forest Service undertook a reforestation project on affected National Forest lands.

== Human history ==
=== Native people ===
The Bass Lake area was historically inhabited by the Mono people. Many were displaced in 1851 during the Mariposa War. A battle near Goat Mountain in January 1851 resulted in the death of Chief José Rey. The site became known as Battle Mountain and was later renamed Goat Mountain.

Some Mono families remained in the area after the war. The Sierra Forest Reserve was established in 1893, and federal regulation of grazing, timber cutting, and other uses increased after passage of the Organic Act of 1897. According to local historian Dwight H. Barnes, federal land-use restrictions limited the ability of Native residents to obtain permits because they were not U.S. citizens. The Indian Citizenship Act of 1924 granted citizenship to Native Americans born in the United States; by then, most Mono families had left the Bass Lake area.

=== Lumber industry ===
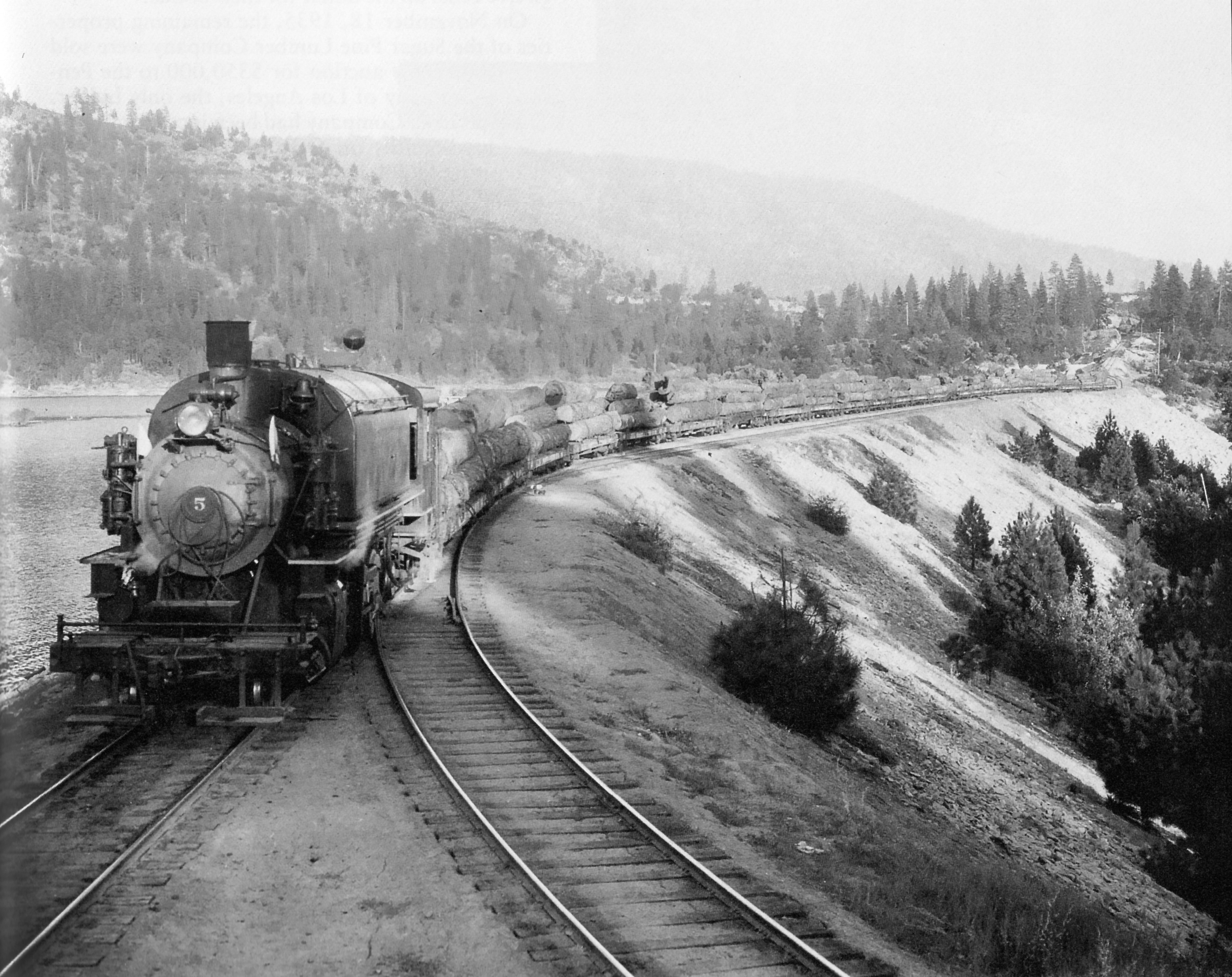
Hauling logs over Bass Lake Dam in 1926.

The first sawmill in the Bass Lake area was built in 1854 at the base of Willow Creek falls by Charles P. Converse and Bill Chitiser. It was the first lumber mill in what is now Madera County. Logging in the Crane Valley basin cleared land that was later used for ranching, farming, and eventually the creation of the Bass Lake reservoir.

In the 1920s, the town of Wishon, on the western shore of Bass Lake, became the headquarters of the Sugar Pine Lumber Company, the last major logging enterprise established in the Southern Sierra Nevada. The company operated a rail line connecting Bass Lake with Central Camp, its main logging site. The route extended about twelve miles with grades up to 4.5 percent, and was worked by a large saddle-tank locomotive built for the operation.

The railroad was not profitable, and in its final two years operated briefly as a tourist line from Pinedale before closing in 1931.

=== Hydroelectricity ===
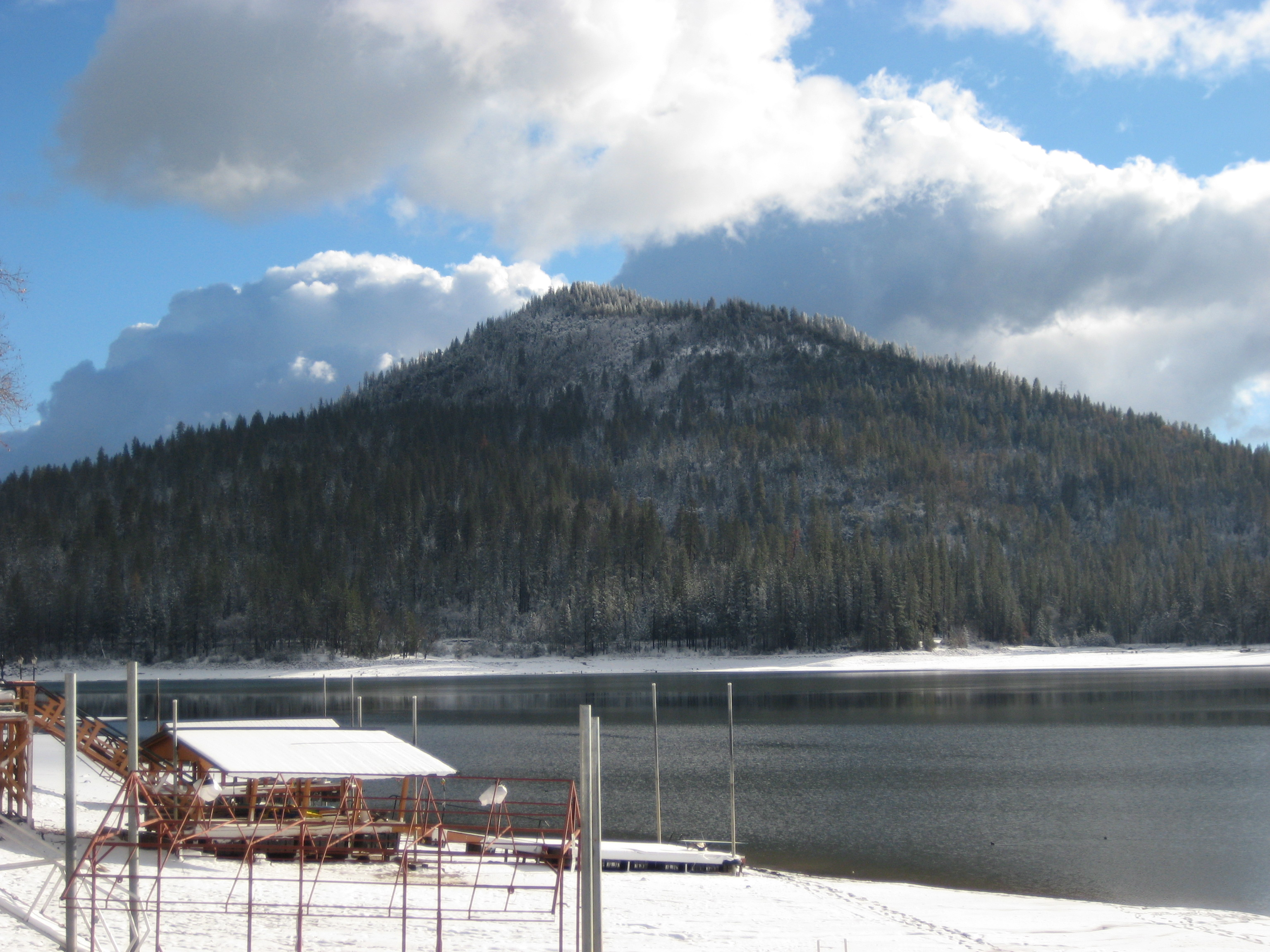
Bass Lake in December: Water levels at 35% capacity, ready for seasonal runoff

Bass Lake was created in 1901 with the construction of Crane Valley Dam by the San Joaquin Electric Company. The project was intended to supply hydroelectric power to the San Joaquin Valley.

The dam was raised in 1905 and again in 1910, reaching a height of 145 feet (44 m). A seismic retrofit completed in 2012 added about 300,000 cubic yards (230,000 m^{3}) of rockfill and raised the crest by 8 feet (2.4 m).

Reservoir levels are drawn down each year for irrigation and power generation, with storage reduced to about 35% of capacity by winter to accommodate runoff. Bass Lake is not designed for multi-year storage.

In 2020, PG&E announced plans to sell the Crane Valley Hydroelectric Project, which includes Bass Lake and associated facilities.

=== Wishon Airport ===
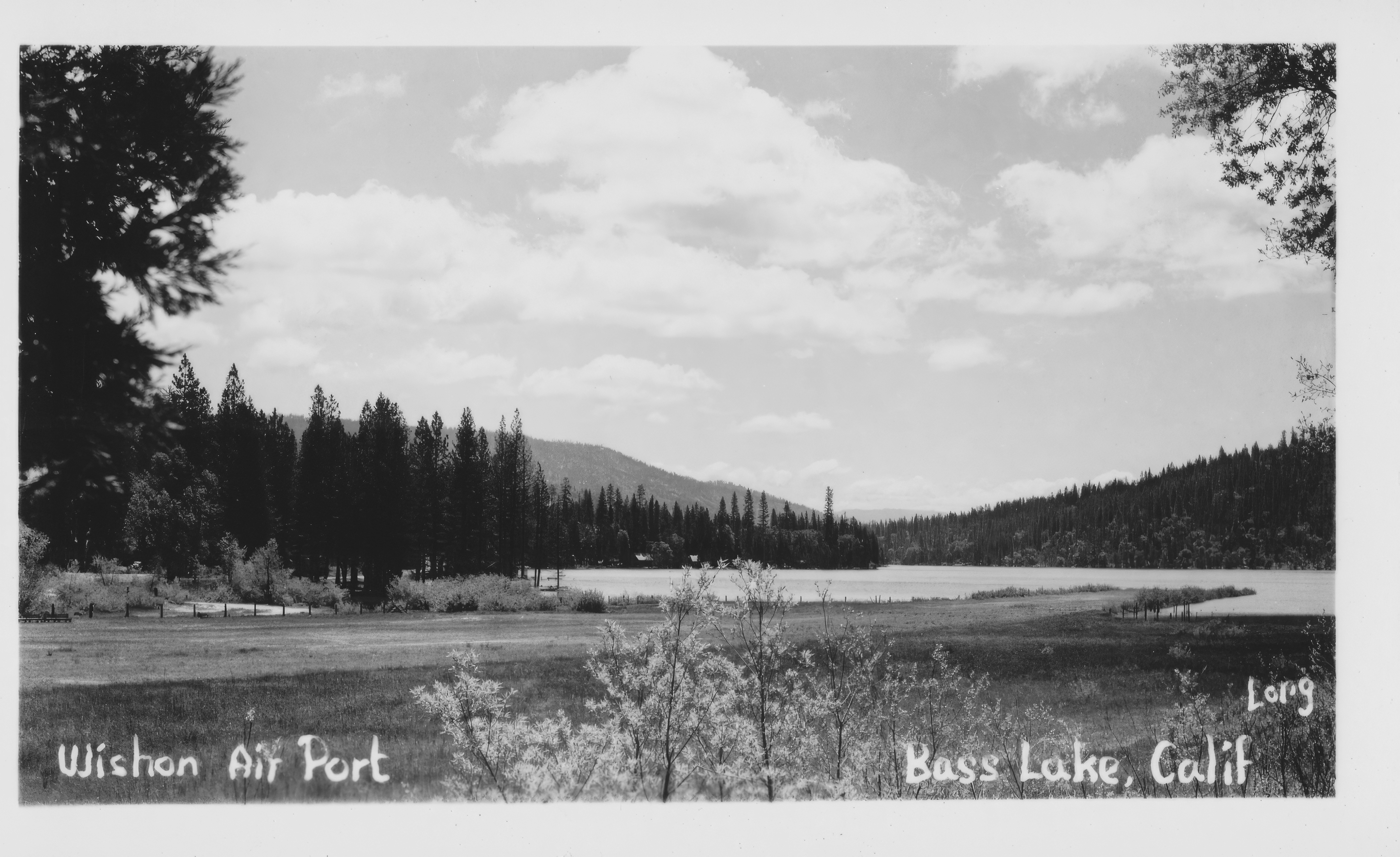
Wishon Airport

The Wishon airstrip opened in June 1937 on the western shore of Bass Lake. It was originally constructed for U.S. Forest Service use but was also used by private pilots.

The unpaved runway was about 2,200 feet (670 m) long and operated as a one-way strip, requiring approaches over the lake.The FAA declined to certify the facility in the 1960s, citing safety concerns. Operations ended in the 1980s, and the site was later redeveloped for housing.

=== Hells Angels ===
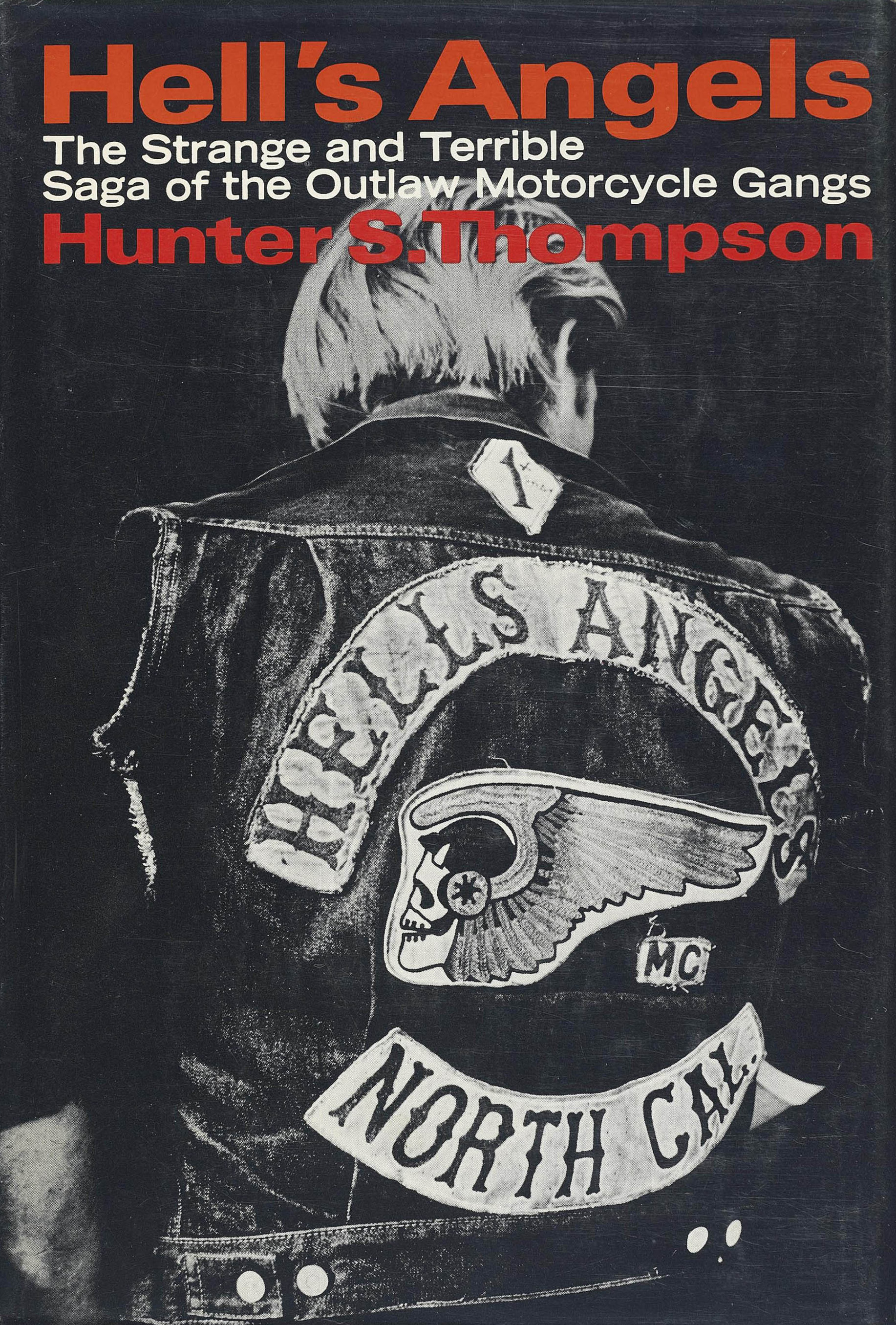
Hunter S. Thompson described the Bass Lake gatherings in his 1966 book Hell's Angels.

During the 1960s, Bass Lake was a gathering place for chapters of the Hells Angels Motorcycle Club. The gatherings became known as the Bass Lake Runs and brought riders from different parts of California to the lake.

The best-known gathering took place over the Fourth of July weekend in 1965. In anticipation of the run, Madera County officials obtained a temporary restraining order and law enforcement established roadblocks on routes into the area. Journalist Hunter S. Thompson, who was then reporting on the Hells Angels, attended the gathering and later devoted a chapter of his book Hell's Angels to the event.

Despite extensive preparations by law enforcement and concern among local residents, the 1965 gathering ended without major violence. The Hells Angels returned to Bass Lake the following year; the Madera Tribune reported that the 1966 gathering also passed without serious incidents.

The Bass Lake Runs continued after the mid-1960s but gradually declined in scale. The gatherings continued into the 1970s and had largely disappeared by the 1980s.

== Development ==
Most of the land surrounding Bass Lake is part of the Sierra National Forest, with public campgrounds and picnic areas along the southern shore.

Private homes are concentrated on the north shore, particularly within the Pines Tract. Cabins were developed there beginning in the 1930s under lease agreements with PG&E. In 1992, PG&E sold approximately 125 acres (51 ha) of land to the Bass Lake Homeowners Association.

Tourist development around the lake began in the early 20th century. The Pines Resort was established on the north shore in 1901 and rebuilt after a fire in 1962. Ducey's Bass Lake Lodge opened in 1941 and was destroyed by fire in 1988; a replacement opened near Pines Village in 1991. On the south shore, The Forks Resort was established in the 1920s, while Miller's Landing was established in 1928 by John McDougald.

== Recreation ==
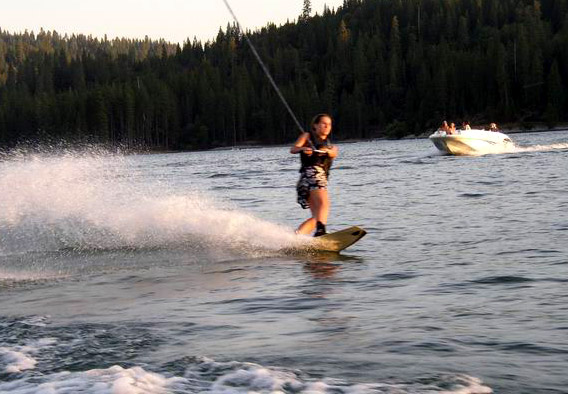
Wakeboarding before sunset.

Bass Lake developed into a major recreation destination during the 20th century. By 1955, it was drawing more than half a million visitors annually. Fishing has long been among the lake's recreational uses, with anglers traveling to the area by the early 20th century. Other activities include swimming, boating, and water skiing.

An Independence Day fireworks display has been held at the lake since the 1930s and has long attracted large crowds.

Bass Lake hosted the United States Triathlon Series National Championships in 1983 and 1984, and continues to host triathlon events.

== Education ==
Bass Lake Elementary School opened on the lake's north shore in 1947 and operated until 2010.

Low enrollment periodically threatened the school with closure, including in 1966. By 2010, enrollment had fallen to 44 students. The district cited declining enrollment and rising operating costs in its decision to close the school.

== Filming locations ==
Bass Lake has been used as a filming location for several feature films.

In 1931, RKO filmed scenes for Carnival Boat at the Sugar Pine Lumber Company on the lake's eastern shore.

The 1945 film Leave Her to Heaven used Bass Lake to represent a setting in Maine.

In 1987, Bass Lake was a principal filming location for the comedy The Great Outdoors, with several scenes filmed at Ducey's Bass Lake Lodge.

== See also ==
- List of lakes in California
