= Hiawatha (1952 film) =

1952 film by Kurt Neumann

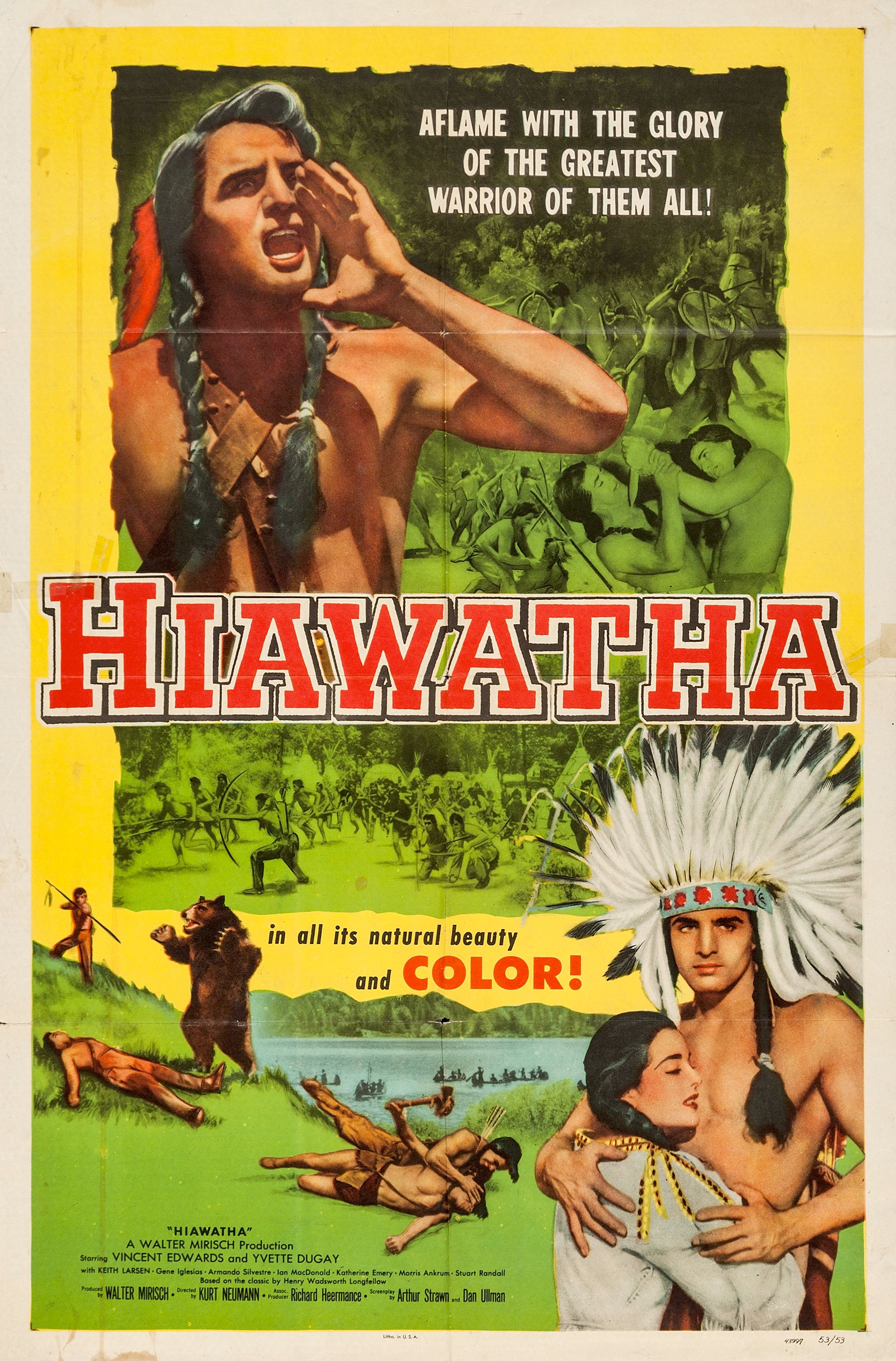
- Movie poster
- Directed by: Kurt Neumann
- Screenplay by: Arthur Strawn and Dan Ullman
- Based on: Epic poem by Henry Wadsworth Longfellow
- Produced by: Walter Mirisch
- Starring: Vincent Edwards; Yvette Dugay
- Cinematography: Harry Neumann
- Edited by: Walter Hannemann
- Music by: Marlin Skiles
- Color process: Cinecolor
- Production company: Walter Mirisch Productions
- Distributed by: Allied Artists Pictures
- Release date: December 25, 1952 (New York)
- Running time: 80 minutes
- Country: United States
- Language: English

Hiawatha is a 1952 American Western film directed by Kurt Neumann and starring Vincent Edwards and Yvette Dugay. The screenplay is based on the 1855 epic poem The Song of Hiawatha by Henry Wadsworth Longfellow.

== Plot ==
Hiawatha, a member of the Ojibwe Indian tribe, is on a peace mission to the Dakota tribe and meets and falls in love with Minnehaha. The romance is obstructed by a threatened war between the two tribes, instigated by a hot-headed Ojibway tribe member. The war is averted and Hiawatha learns that he is actually the long-missing son of the Dakota chief.

== Cast ==
- Vince Edwards as Hiawatha
- Yvette Dugay as Minnehaha
- Keith Larsen as Pau Pukkeewis
- Eugene Iglesias as Chibiabos
- Armando Silvestre as Kwasind
- Michael Tolan as Neyadji
- Ian MacDonald as Chief Megissogwon
- Katherine Emery as Nokomis
- Morris Ankrum as Iagoo
- Stephen Chase as Lakku
- Stuart Randall as Mudjekeewis
- Eula Morgan as Mother of Chibiabos

== Production ==
Location filming took place at Bass Lake in California. Ducey's Bass Lake Lodge served as the production headquarters.

In early 1950, production was delayed because the main character's beliefs and dialogue were considered too close to the communist doctrine. Monogram Pictures president Steve Broidy stated: "[B]ecause of the tremendous influence that the motion picture industry exerts internationally, producers are being extremely cautious in preventing any subject matter to reach the screen which might possibly be interpreted as Communistic propaganda to even the slightest degree. The Hiawatha screenplay, written by a scenarist whose Americanism is unquestioned, still left us with the feeling that Communistic elements might conceivably misinterpret the theme of our picture, despite its American origin, and that is why we have postponed its production."

Hiawatha resumed production in early 1951, with Broidy quoted as explaining that "the avalanche of editorial comment which greeted our announcement convinced us unquestionably that the American public would not be dupes for any Communist line, and that our Hiawatha picture could only serve the highest ends of education and entertainment".

== Reception ==
In a contemporary review for The New York Times, critic A. H. Weiler wrote: "Anyone who would criticize 'Hiawatha' ... deserves to suffer the slings and arrows of every moviegoer from the age of 4 to 14. There isn't a gunshlot in the entire adventure to disturb older audiences. For a glance at the program notes will reveal that director Kurt Neumann and the stars, Vincent Edwards and Yvette Dugay, are as reverent of the fables made famous by the Henry Wadsworth Longfellow poem as the author, himself. And since it is not too bloody a yarn they're spinning parents cannot cavil on this score."
