= San Joaquin Light and Power Corporation =

Former Fresno-based utility company

- Type: Private
- Industry: Electricity
- Founded: 1895
- Headquarters: Fresno, California, United States
- Products: Electricity

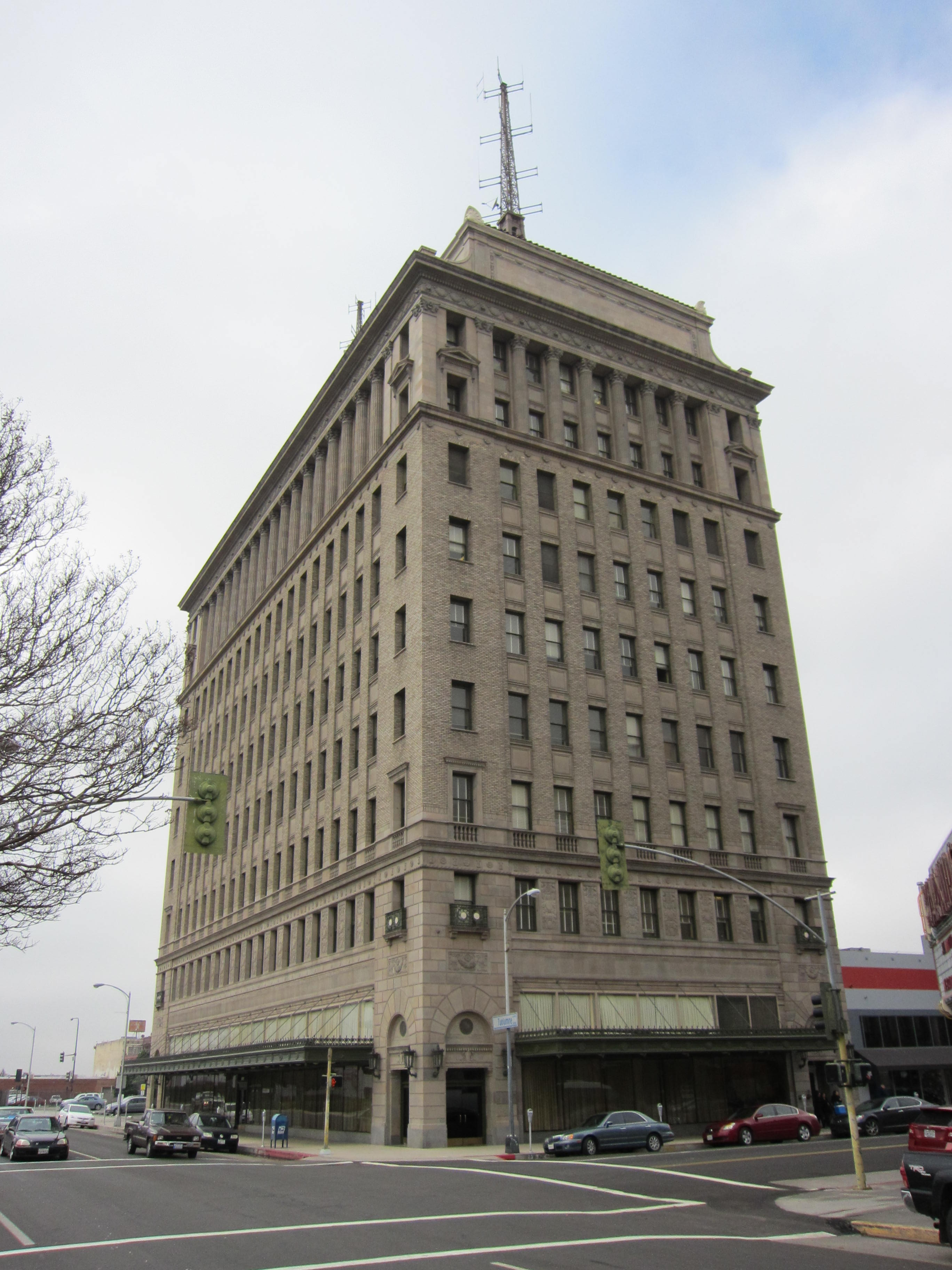
San Joaquin Light and Power Corporation Building in Fresno, California

The San Joaquin Light and Power Corporation was a utility company that provided electricity to seven counties in the San Joaquin Valley of California. The company is one of several utilities acquired by the Pacific Gas and Electric Company during the 1920s and 1930s to form the modern PG&E system.

== History ==
The company was first organized as the San Joaquin Electric Company on April 1, 1895, by engineer John Samuel Eastwood for the construction of the hydroelectric San Joaquin Powerhouse No. 1, located 37 miles from Fresno on Willow Creek, a tributary of the San Joaquin River. The company later became the San Joaquin Power Company in 1905 and then the San Joaquin Light and Power Corporation in 1910. By 1920, the company had 11 powerhouses.

San Joaquin's early business was challenged by the competing Fresno Gas and Electric Company, controlled by Fulton G. Berry, owner of Fresno's Grand Central Hotel. Berry used riparian claims filed on water upstream from San Joaquin Electric Company's intake flume to divert water away from the company's powerhouse through a mile-long ditch. Combined with several years of drought, this diversion of water forced San Joaquin Electric into bankruptcy in 1899. (Note: The Mercantile Trust Co. as mortgage trustee filed suit asking for a receiver when interest due July 1, 1899 on $550,000 (equivalent to $21,285,000 in 2025) outstanding of an authorized issue created in 1895 of $800,000 (equivalent to $30,960,000 in 2025) 6% bonds was not paid.)

Despite the company's bankruptcy, San Joaquin Electric continued to operate. Bondholders, seeking to protect their investment by providing the company's powerhouse a steady source of water, financed the 1901 construction of what would become the hydraulic fill Crane Valley Dam and the reservoir of Bass Lake.

On January 14, 1902 the company was foreclosed, the upset price of the property (Note: Water system; Main plant; 600 acres of land in township 7 and 8 south, range 22 and 23; 13/16th of power house site (138 acres) in Madera and Fresno county; Substation at Fresno (36.73888°N 119.78699°W - map); 2,750 par $100 (equivalent to $3,721 in 2025) shares of the Fresno Water Co. (adjacent to Fresno SS); all municipal franchise in Fresno, King and Madera counties; Hanford extension (35 miles of transmission line from Fresno to Hanford)) was fixed at $350,000 (equivalent to $13,024,038 in 2025), the outstanding debt stood at $683,494 principal and interest (equivalent to $25,433,863 in 2025).

San Joaquin Electric Company was purchased out of bankruptcy in 1902 by William G. Kerckhoff, a lumber magnate and president of Pacific Light & Power, and reincorporated as the San Joaquin Power Company (Note: incorporated in August 1902 with a capital stock of $800,000 (par $100), all outstanding and $800,000 5% 40-year bonds dated Dec 1, 1902, not callable but with sinking fund.). Under Kerckhoff, San Joaquin Power Company purchased the electric system of the competing Fresno Gas and Electric Company in 1903 for $25,000 (equivalent to $895,833 in 2025).

San Joaquin Power also reached a separate 1903 agreement with the California Gas and Electric Company—which would merge with the San Francisco Gas and Electric Company two years later to create PG&E—setting territories for electrical service, drawing a line that extended roughly from the southern border of Santa Cruz County east to the southern border of Mono County.

San Joaquin Light and Power Corporation was acquired in 1924 by the Great Western Power Company, a subsidiary of The North American Company. North American subsequently sold its interests in the combined utilities to the Pacific Gas and Electric Company in 1930 in exchange for $114 million in PG&E stock (equivalent to $2197 million in 2025), creating a single consolidated utility serving most of Northern and Central California.
