= Ducey's Bass Lake Lodge =

Historic mountain lodge in Bass Lake, California, USA

Ducey's Lodge
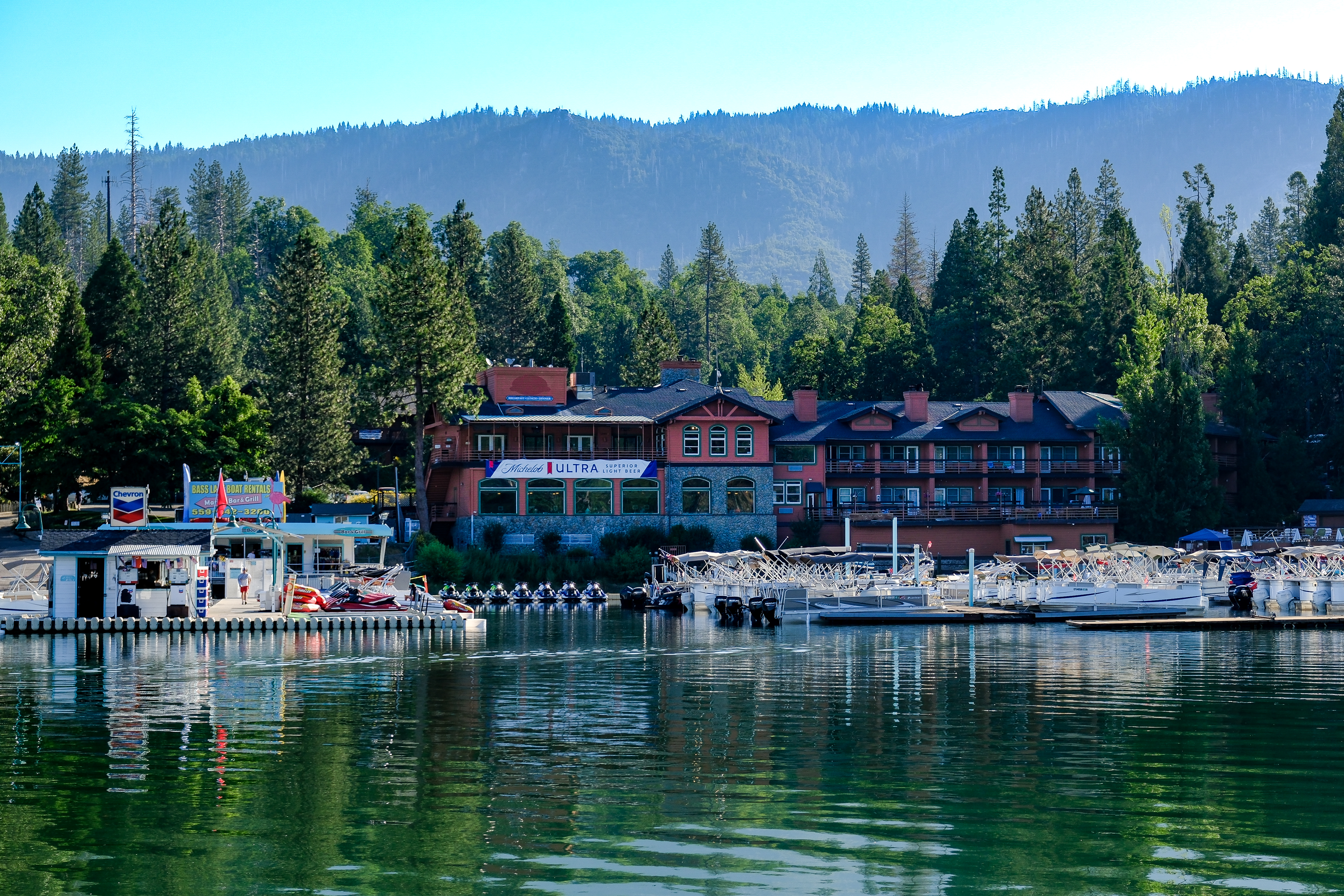
- Ducey's on the Lake

- Location within California Location within the United States

General information
- Location: 39255 Marina Drive; Bass Lake, CA
- Coordinates: 37°19′8.32″N 119°33′25.35″W
- Opening: 1941

Website
- basslake.com

Ducey's Bass Lake Lodge was a resort on the northern shore of Bass Lake in Madera County, California. Established as Freeman's Bass Lake Lodge in 1941, it was purchased by Maurice and Marie Ducey in 1950 and later became part of The Pines Resort in 1975.

The lodge was used as a filming location for the 1988 comedy The Great Outdoors. It was destroyed by fire on June 2, 1988. A replacement, Ducey's on the Lake, opened in 1991 about one mile east of the original site.

== History ==
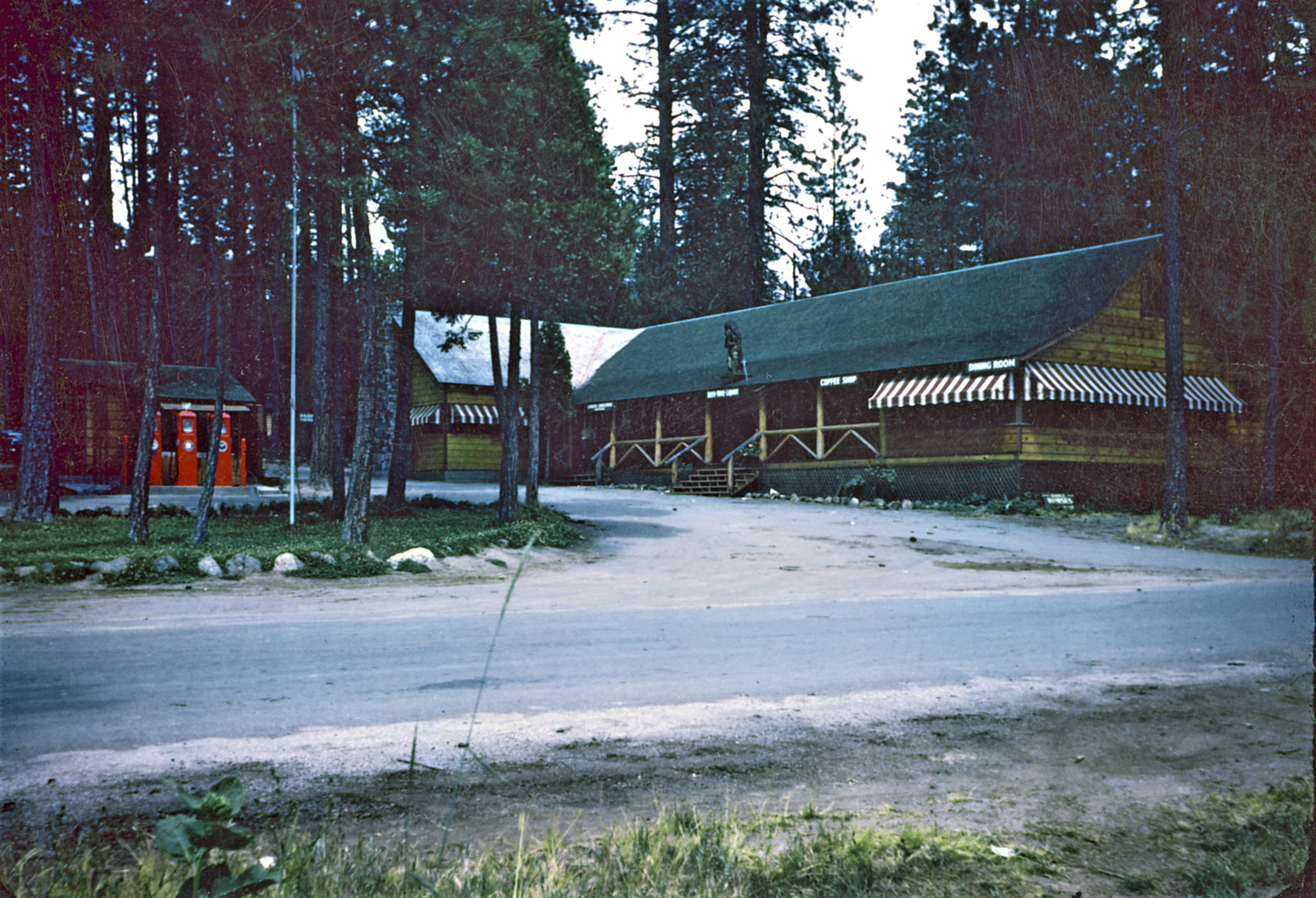
Ducey's Bass Lake Lodge in the 1950s.

Freeman's Bass Lake Lodge was established in 1941 by Buddy Freeman on the north shore of Bass Lake, about a mile west of the Pines Village. The property included a bar, restaurant, and rental cabins. In 1947, it was sold to Jeff Jeffords, Karl Briz, and A. C. Zingle.

Maurice and Marie Ducey purchased the lodge in 1950, adding a general store and campgrounds and displaying collections of Native American artifacts, firearms, antiques, and taxidermy. In 1952, the lodge served as the filming headquarters for Hiawatha. The Duceys renamed the business Ducey's Bass Lake Lodge and operated it until retiring in 1968. The property was subsequently owned by Al Westman and, beginning in 1969, Dr. Robert and Gloria Rickard. In 1975, the property became part of The Pines Resort.

Bass Lake and Ducey's were used during filming of the 1988 comedy The Great Outdoors. A cabin constructed for the film at Universal Studios was modeled after Ducey's rental cabins.

On June 2, 1988, a kitchen fire destroyed the lodge. Multiple additions and attic spaces hindered firefighting efforts, and only the stone chimneys and porch remained after the four-hour blaze.

== Ducey’s on the Lake ==
Following the destruction of the original lodge in 1988, The Pines Resort built a replacement designed by local architect Michael Karby. The new lodge was constructed on the lakeshore about one mile east of the original site and opened on April 20, 1991.

Members of the Mono people participated in the opening ceremonies. The interior incorporated items salvaged from the 1988 fire, including the lodge's 12-foot road sign, along with displays of historical photographs and hunting trophies.
