= Mono winds =

Strong downslope wind in the Sierra Nevada

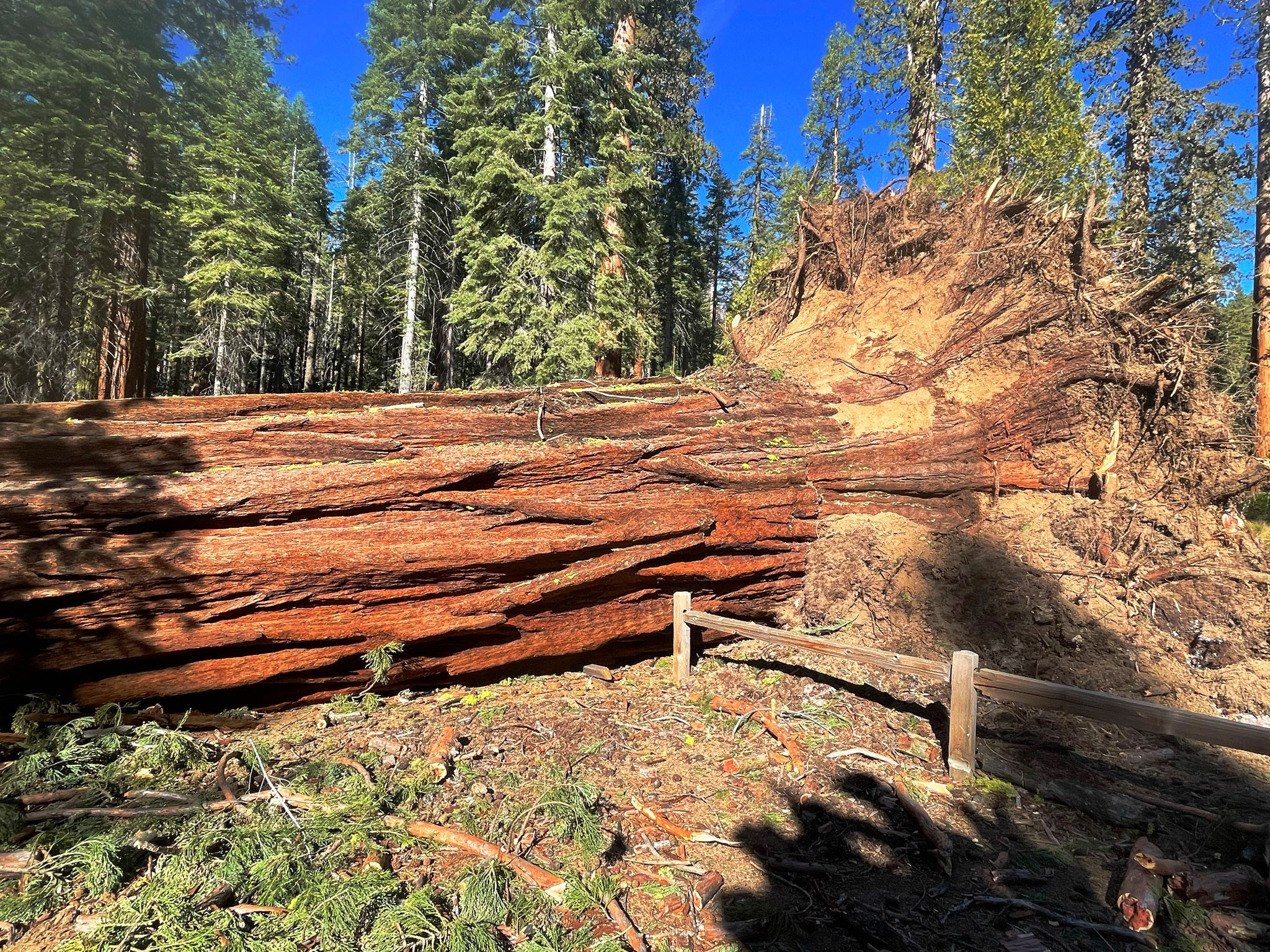
Giant Sequoia in the Mariposa Grove, blown down by Mono winds in January 2021

Mono winds are strong, dry, northeasterly foehn winds that descend the western slopes of the central Sierra Nevada in California. They occur when easterly or northeasterly winds cross the Sierra Nevada and descend its western slopes.

The name "Mono" comes from the Mono people. Damaging Mono wind events have produced average wind speeds of about 50 miles per hour (80 km/h) with gusts reaching 100 miles per hour (160 km/h).

== Meteorology and causes ==
Two types of Mono wind have been described. Type I, the Great Basin high Mono, develops after the passage of a cold front and an upper-level short-wave trough. High pressure builds over the Great Basin, creating a pressure gradient across the Sierra Nevada. Northeasterly to easterly winds cross the range, with low relative humidity and locally strong winds on the western slopes.

Type II, also known as the jet-stream Mono, occurs when the polar jet stream is oriented approximately north to south over central California. Strong flow crosses the high Sierra and produces mountain waves on the western slopes. The winds can be highly localized: during the day they primarily affect high ridges and passes, while at night they can descend to lower ridges and slopes. Estimated speeds of 70 miles per hour (110 km/h) or more have been reported during some Type II events, with winds near 80 miles per hour (130 km/h) recorded at Bass Lake and Goat Mountain.

Mono wind weather patterns occur mainly from October through April and are most common in December and January.

== Geographic distribution ==
Mono winds occur along the western slopes of the central Sierra Nevada. They originate east of the Sierra crest and cross the range before descending toward the western foothills. Wind speeds can vary considerably over short distances as the flow interacts with the terrain. Canyons and other topographic features can funnel the winds and increase their speed.

Mono winds have been documented in Yosemite National Park and elsewhere on the western slopes of the central Sierra Nevada. They are similar to the Santa Ana winds of Southern California, although Mono winds are generally colder and more humid.

== Impacts ==
=== Forest and property damage ===
Mono winds can cause extensive tree blowdown on the western slopes of the Sierra Nevada. A U.S. Forest Service study of the Kings River Ranger District found that Mono winds were responsible for documented winter blowdown events, although only about 12 percent of the Mono wind events examined resulted in blowdown.

During a December 1967 Mono wind event, damage around Bass Lake was estimated at more than $1 million. Wind gusts at Millerton Lake were estimated at over 70 miles per hour (110 km/h). On December 7, 1971, another Mono wind event struck Yosemite National Park, where more than 200 trees were blown down and the ski lift at Badger Pass was severely damaged.

On January 19, 2021, a Mono windstorm toppled trees and damaged homes, vehicles, and other infrastructure in Yosemite. At least 15 giant sequoias fell in the Mariposa Grove, and the park closed for nearly two weeks while hazards were assessed and cleared.

=== Wildfire behavior ===
Mono winds can occur during the autumn fire season, when strong winds and low relative humidity can increase fire danger. In September 1970, a Type I Mono wind occurred during the Red Mountain Fire in the Sierra Nevada. Strong easterly winds and low humidity contributed to the fire's spread over more than 25,000 acres (10,000 ha).
