= She's Having a Baby =

1988 film by John Hughes

- Theatrical release poster
- Directed by: John Hughes
- Written by: John Hughes
- Produced by: John Hughes; Bill Brown (associate producer); Ronald Colby (executive producer)
- Starring: Kevin Bacon; Elizabeth McGovern
- Cinematography: Donald Peterman
- Edited by: Alan Heim
- Music by: Stewart Copeland
- Production company: Hughes Entertainment
- Distributed by: Paramount Pictures
- Release date: February 5, 1988
- Running time: 106 minutes
- Country: United States
- Language: English
- Budget: $20 million
- Box office: $16 million (domestic)

She's Having a Baby is a 1988 American romantic comedy film directed and written by John Hughes and starring Kevin Bacon and Elizabeth McGovern. It tells the story of a young newlywed couple who try to cope with married life and their parents' expectations. The film was released by Paramount Pictures on February 5, 1988, and was met with mixed reviews while underperforming at the box office by grossing $16 million in the United States against a $20 million budget.

== Plot ==
This film looks at the lives of Jefferson "Jake" and Kristy Briggs, from their wedding day until the birth of their first child, mostly through Jake's eyes, with his voiceover commentaries and several imaginary scenes. Before their wedding day, Jake asks his best friend Davis McDonald if he thinks Jake will be happy to which Davis says, "Yeah, you'll be happy. You just won't know it."

After their wedding, Jake and Kristy head for New Mexico, where Jake works toward gaining a master's degree, though he leaves before finishing. They return to Chicago, where Jake is hired as an advertising copywriter. Kristy is hired as a research analyst, and they buy a house in the suburbs.

Jake feels pressure from his parents, society, and his wife to grow up and have a child. Later, Kristy informs Jake that she stopped taking contraceptives without telling him. After several months, they discover that the reason she hasn't gotten pregnant is because Jake has a low sperm count.

After not seeing Jake and Kristy for two years, Davis visits unexpectedly with a girlfriend who Kristy disapproves of. Jake invites them to stay, much to Kristy's chagrin and Davis tells Jake that Kristy is holding him back. Meanwhile, Jake fantasizes about having an affair with a mysterious young French model though, when the opportunity looks to be presenting itself, he can't bring himself to do it.

Upon visiting after another long absence, Davis confesses that his father has died. Jake and Kristy are supportive, but things take a turn when Davis makes a pass at Kristy. She turns him down, telling him that she is in love with Jake.

The couple begins a fertility program, which succeeds. During a traumatic labor in which it is discovered the baby is in a breech position with its head caught in the birth canal, Jake must leave the delivery room. He worries about losing Kristy, realizing that his lack of satisfaction in life was due to his own selfishness and immaturity.

The last scene reveals that Jake's voiceover was the new father reading his novel entitled She's Having a Baby to his wife and son. During the credits, Jake and Kristy talk about what to name their son as a montage of family members, people they know, Roman Craig, Chet Ripley, and Buck Ripley from the following film The Great Outdoors, Ferris Bueller from Ferris Bueller's Day Off, and an assortment of different actors pitching their suggestions of boy names is shown before settling on the name Christopher.

== Cast ==
- Kevin Bacon as Jefferson "Jake" Edward Briggs, an advertising copywriter
  - Neal Bacon as young Jake
- Elizabeth McGovern as Kristen "Kristy" Bainbridge Briggs, a research analyst and Jake's childhood sweetheart who marries Jake
  - Laure Aronica as young Kristy
- Alec Baldwin as Davis McDonald, Jake's friend
- William Windom as Russell "Russ" Bainbridge, Kristy's father
- Paul Gleason as Howard, a man who hires Jake to work as an advertisement copywriter
- Holland Taylor as Sarah Briggs, Jake's mother
- Cathryn Damon as Gayle Bainbridge, Kristy's mother
- John Ashton as Ken
- James Ray as Jim Briggs, Jake's father
- Dennis Dugan as Bill, the business partner of Howard
- Edie McClurg as Lynn
- Larry Hankin as Hank
- Nancy Lenehan as Cynthia
- Bill Erwin as Grandpa Briggs
- Reba McKinney as Grandma Briggs
- Valerie Breiman as Erin
- Lili Taylor as Girl in Medical Lab
- Gail O'Grady as Laura

Besides some of the characters mentioned above, the following appear in the end credits pitching their ideas of boy names for Jake and Kristy's son where they are all uncredited:

- Kirstie Alley
- Harry Anderson
- Dan Aykroyd as Roman Craig from The Great Outdoors
- Matthew Broderick as Ferris Bueller from Ferris Bueller's Day Off
- John Candy as Chet Ripley from The Great Outdoors
- Dyan Cannon
- Belinda Carlisle
- Stewart Copeland
- Ted Danson
- Judi Evans
- Bob Fraser
- Woody Harrelson
- Robert Hays
- Amy Irving
- Magic Johnson
- Michael Keaton
- Joanna Kerns
- Elias Koteas
- Penny Marshall
- Bill Murray
- Olivia Newton-John
- Roy Orbison
- Cindy Pickett
- Bronson Pinchot
- Annie Potts
- John Ratzenberger
- Ally Sheedy
- Lyman Ward
- Wil Wheaton
- Chris Young as Buck Ripley from The Great Outdoors
- Warren Zevon

== Production ==
The film was shot in Winnetka, Illinois, and Evanston, Illinois, from September 1986 to December 1986. However, several scenes were shot directly in the Field Museum in Chicago, Illinois. Most of John Hughes's films either take place in Chicago or the suburbs of Chicago, or are about people going to or coming from Chicago. Cathryn Damon died of ovarian cancer before the film's release and thus appeared posthumously.

== Soundtrack ==
She's Having a Baby

Soundtrack album by Various Artists
- Released: 1988
- Genres: Rock, new wave
- Length: 37:10
- Label: I.R.S. / MCA

Professional ratings
Review scores
Source	Rating
AllMusic	4.5/5 stars

The soundtrack album of She's Having a Baby was released in 1988 on I.R.S. Records label and produced by Dave Wakeling. The song during the birth sequence is "This Woman's Work" by Kate Bush and is featured on her 1989 album The Sensual World. John Hughes is thanked in the album's liner notes. The song playing during the trailer is "Music for a Found Harmonium" by the Penguin Cafe Orchestra. The song played during the street party is "How Sweet It Is (To Be Loved by You)" by Marvin Gaye.

=== Music video ===
In the video for Dave Wakeling's title song, he performs alongside a female backup singer; behind them, a huge screen displays various clips from the movie. All of this is alternated with footage of Wakeling as he shops at a music store for guitars.

Track listing

1. "She's Having a Baby" – Dave Wakeling
2. "Haunted When the Minutes Drag" – Love and Rockets
3. "Desire (Come and Get It)" – Gene Loves Jezebel
4. "Happy Families" – XTC
5. "Crazy Love" – Bryan Ferry
6. "You Just Haven't Earned It Yet, Baby" – Kirsty MacColl
7. "Apron Strings" – Everything but the Girl
8. "This Woman's Work" – Kate Bush
9. "It's All in the Game" – Carmel
10. "Full of Love" – Dr. Calculus

== Reception ==
The film received mixed reviews from critics and has 44% positive reviews on Rotten Tomatoes based on 45 reviews. The site's consensus states: "Kevin Bacon and Elizabeth McGovern struggle to sustain a spark in She's Having a Baby, a blasé adult romance that lacks the specificity and style of writer-director John Hughes' more successful forays into teenage angst."

Roger Ebert of the Chicago Sun-Times gave She's Having a Baby a mixed 2 stars out of 4. He wrote that the film "begins with the simplest and most moving of stories and interrupts it with an amazing assortment of gimmicks," being salvaged only by strong performances from Bacon and McGovern. In An Evening with Kevin Smith 2: Evening Harder director Kevin Smith cites She's Having a Baby as his favorite Hughes film. He also cites it as a template for Jersey Girl, joking that both films were financially unsuccessful.
