= Badger Pass =

Badger Pass may refer to:

== Mountain passes ==
- Badger Pass (Alberta), a pass in Banff National Park, Alberta, Canada
- Badger Pass (California), a pass in Yosemite National Park, California, US
- Badger Pass (Flathead Range), a pass on the Continental Divide of the Americas in Bob Marshall Wilderness, Montana, US
- Badger Pass (Pioneer Mountains), a pass in the Pioneer Mountains, Montana, US

== Winter sports area ==
- Badger Pass Ski Area, a ski area near Badger Pass (California) in Yosemite National Park, California, US
