= The Pines Resort =

Lakeside resort in the Yosemite area

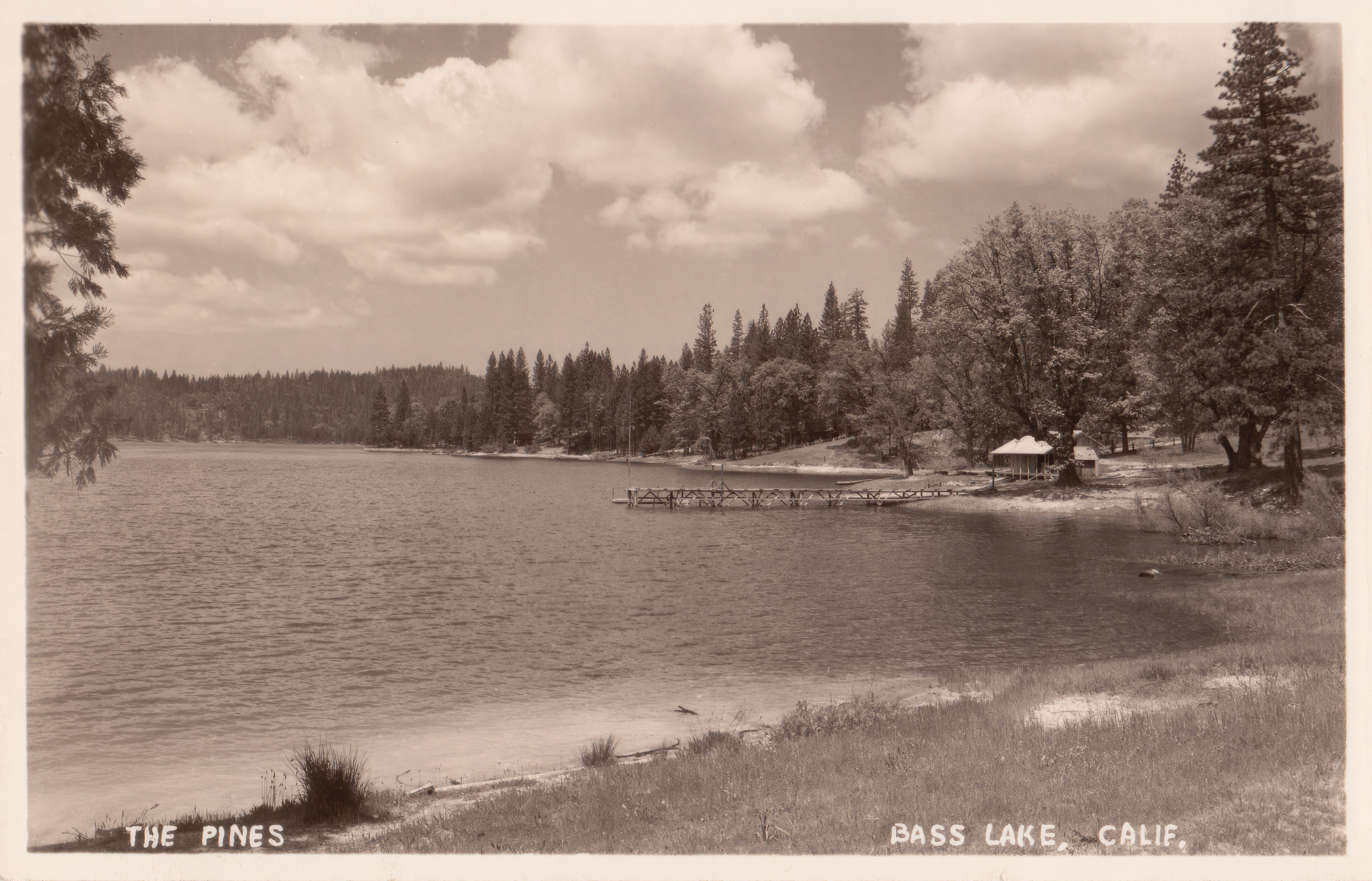
- The Pines Resort

- Location within California Location within the United States

General information
- Location: 39150 Road 222
- Coordinates: 37.3191764983°N 119.5576778333°W
- Opening: 1901
- Owner: Kyu Sun Choe and Sun Wah Choe

Design and construction
- Architect: Michael Karby

Other information
- Number of restaurants: 2

Website
- http://www.basslake.com/

The Pines Resort is a lakeside resort on the north shore of Bass Lake in Madera County, California. Established in 1901 by William Day and William Haskell, it was among the earliest resorts developed in the Crane Valley area. The original resort was destroyed by fire in December 1962 and rebuilt the following year.

During the 20th century, the resort developed into a larger complex that included the commercial area known as Pines Village. In 1975, it acquired Ducey's Bass Lake Lodge, which became part of the resort complex. The original Ducey's was destroyed by fire in 1988 and replaced by Ducey's on the Lake in 1991.

== History ==
=== Founding ===
Hydroelectric development in Crane Valley began in the 1890s with the formation of the San Joaquin Electric Company. The company completed an earthen dam on Willow Creek in 1901, creating the reservoir that later became Bass Lake.

The Pines Resort was established in 1901 by William Day and William Haskell. Day and Haskell operated a sawmill at Willow Creek and built cabins for visitors, establishing one of the earliest resorts in Crane Valley.

By the 1920s, The Pines was promoted as both a summer resort and a stopover for motorists traveling to Yosemite National Park. A 1921 automobile guide advertised hotel rooms and housekeeping cabins with private bathrooms and described the resort as the "coolest place in California."

By the 1930s, the resort included a dining room, post office, and telephone service. Guests ate at set times announced by a bell, and telephone calls were handled through a single manually operated line.

=== 1962 fire and reconstruction ===
Claude Williams purchased The Pines Resort from Charlie Blank and O. L. Everetts in 1944. In 1958, he turned management of the resort over to his children, Claude Jr., G. E. ("Bud"), and Joyce Kimbro.

A fire in December 1962 destroyed the resort. Construction of a new resort building began in January 1963, with Crowley Hill Construction Co. as contractor and R. W. Steyens & Associates as architects. The 16,000-square-foot (1,500 m^{2}) building cost more than $200,000 and opened later that year. Its exterior and interior incorporated cedar and pine finishes, peeled-pine posts, stone masonry, large expanses of glass, and a covered porch extending the length of the building.

=== Expansion and Recent Ownership ===
By 1967, The Pines Resort had expanded to include a commercial center known as Pines Village. Businesses included a market, coffee shop, bar, laundromat, bakery, gift shop, theater, real estate office, garage, and U.S. post office.

Greenlaw Partners purchased the resort in 2007. Ownership transferred in 2010 to Kyu Sun Choe and Sun Wah Choe.

Since 1991, Pines Village has hosted an annual Christmas tree lighting and Parade of Lights.
