= The Great Outdoors (film) =

1988 film by Howard Deutch

- Theatrical release poster
- Directed by: Howard Deutch
- Written by: John Hughes
- Produced by: Arne Schmidt
- Starring: Dan Aykroyd; John Candy
- Cinematography: Ric Waite
- Edited by: Seth Flaum; William D. Gordean; Tom Rolf
- Music by: Thomas Newman
- Production company: Hughes Entertainment
- Distributed by: Universal Pictures
- Release date: June 17, 1988
- Running time: 90 minutes
- Country: United States
- Language: English
- Budget: $24-28 million
- Box office: $43.5 million (US)

The Great Outdoors is a 1988 American comedy film directed by Howard Deutch, written and produced by John Hughes, and starring Dan Aykroyd and John Candy with supporting roles by Stephanie Faracy, Annette Bening (in her film debut), Chris Young, Lucy Deakins, and Robert Prosky. The film is about two families spending a vacation at a fictional resort town in northern Wisconsin. Before The Great Outdoors appeared in theaters, Aykroyd, Candy, and Young portrayed their roles during the end credits of She's Having a Baby where they are among the people that pitch the idea names for the baby son of Jake and Kristy.

== Plot ==
Chicagoans Chet Ripley, his wife Connie, and their sons Buck and Ben arrive at their rented lakefront cabin in Pechoggin, Wisconsin, for a summer vacation. To Chet's dismay, Connie's sister Kate, her investment broker husband Roman Craig, and their twin daughters Mara and Cara arrive uninvited.

Roman flaunts his wealth, cooking lobster in place of Chet's traditional hot dogs. After dinner, Chet tells the story of a legendary man-eating grizzly bear in the area that attacked him. He claims he used a shotgun to protect himself and the buckshot shaved the top of the bear's head.

The following day, tensions rise after Roman rents a speedboat and pulls Chet around the lake on water skis unplanned. Meanwhile, Buck romances a local girl named Cammie, but misses a date with her after Chet is challenged by Roman to eat The Old '96er, a 96-ounce steak. Buck tries to apologize, but Cammie refuses to speak to him.

Connie learns that Kate is unhappy in her marriage despite Roman's wealth. That night, a bat enters the cabin, causing Chet and Roman to work together to remove it, and tensions escalate, causing Roman and his family to leave. Before they depart, Roman reveals that he overheard a conversation between Chet and their father-in-law describing how they think Roman is a crooked businessman. Roman reveals that he came to the cabin to offer Chet a $25,000 investment opportunity. Feeling guilty, Chet agrees to write Roman a check.

The families say their goodbyes, and Roman and his family leave. Kate praises Roman for including Chet in the investment, noting that $25,000 is a lot of money for Chet's family. Roman returns to the cabin and confesses that he is bankrupt from failed investments and was planning to use the money in the hopes to financially recover.

During a thunderstorm, Kate discovers that the twins are missing. Chet and Roman find them at the bottom of an abandoned mine shaft, but the claustrophobic Roman is afraid to descend. After some encouragement from Chet, Roman climbs down into the mine, finds his daughters, and escapes the shaft.

Upon returning, Chet is horrified to discover the "Bald-Headed Killer Bear" lurking in the mine. It chases him back to the cabin, smashes through the door, and rampages through the house. Cabin owner Wally bursts in with a loaded shotgun lamp while Roman tries to hold off the bear. Chet shoots the bear, blowing the fur off its rear, and the bear runs out of the house.

The next morning, the families part on amicable terms. Cammie accepts Buck's apology, and they end their brief romance. To Chet's dismay, Connie reveals that she invited the Craigs to stay with them until they can recover. The Ripleys return to Chicago as Chet plans to beat Roman home.

During the end credits, Chet, Connie, Roman, Kate, and Wally dance to "Land of a Thousand Dances" in a bar. In the post-credits scene, the raccoon family (who rummaged through the trash cans throughout the film) talk in their language about what happened to "Jody" and state that she is "bald on both ends now".

== Cast ==
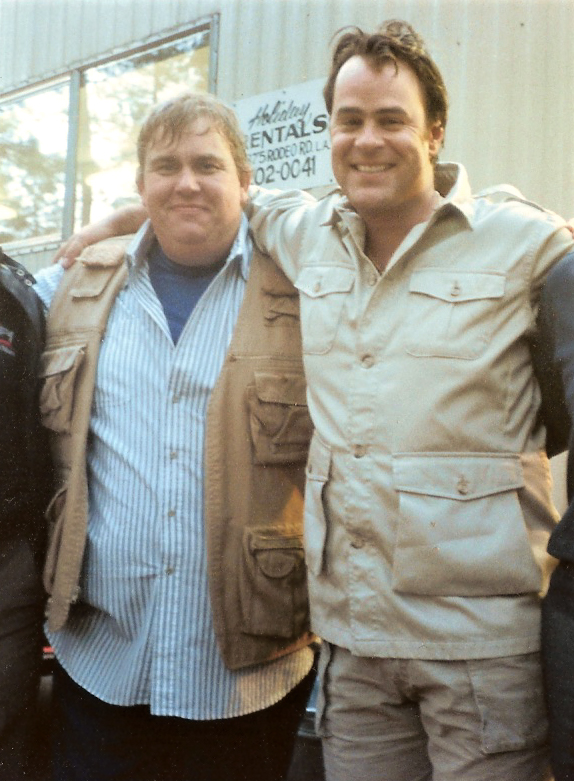
John Candy and Dan Aykroyd during the production of The Great Outdoors in October 1987

- Dan Aykroyd as Roman Craig.
- John Candy as Chester "Chet" Ripley.
- Stephanie Faracy as Connie Ripley, Chet's wife.
- Annette Bening as Kate "Katie" Craig, Roman's wife and Connie's sister.
- Chris Young as Buckley "Buck" Ripley, Chet and Connie's 15 yr old son.
- Lucy Deakins as Cammie, a local girl and A&W waitress.
- Robert Prosky as Wally, the co-owner of "Wally and Juanita's Perk's Pine Lodge Resort".
- Ian Giatti as Benjamin "Benny" Ripley, Chet and Connie's 10 yr old son.
- Hilary Gordon as Cara Craig, Roman and Kate's 6 yr old daughter and Mara's identical twin sister.
- Rebecca Gordon as Mara Craig, Roman and Kate's 6 yr old daughter and Cara's identical twin sister.
- Zoaunne LeRoy as Juanita, the wife of Wally and co-owner of "Wally and Juanita's Perk's Pine Lodge Resort".
- Nancy Lenehan as a waitress.
- Henry Cannon as Gus, hardware store owner.
- John Bloom as Jimbo.
- Lewis Arquette as Herm.
- Britt Leach as Reg, a man who has been struck by lightning 66 times.
- Bart the Bear as Jody the Bald-Headed Bear, a female grizzly bear who lost her fur on top of her head during a previous encounter with Chet.

== Filming ==
=== Filming locations ===
The film was shot in Bass Lake, California, a small resort town near Sierra National Forest over three weeks in October 1987 where it portrayed the fictional Lake Potowotominimac. Ducey's Bass Lake Lodge, a rustic 1940s resort, was featured as "Wally and Juanita's Perk's Pine Lodge Resort". The Loon's Nest vacation cabin, built on the backlot at Universal Studios, was designed to match the style of Ducey's existing cabins.

=== Production ===
The film was shot under the working title "Big Country", but was changed to avoid confusion with Big which was due to come out at the same time. In the original John Hughes script, Roman's redemption came through a daring rescue of his twin girls who had caught a giant fish that towed them around the lake in a small rowboat. A mechanical fish was built for the film. But when it could not be made to work correctly, the script was re-written around the legend of the bald-headed bear and the chase in the final act.

== Reception ==
The Great Outdoors earned a mixed response from critics. On Rotten Tomatoes, the film holds a rating of 44% from 39 reviews. The consensus summarizes: "Even with a pair of talented comedians trying their best, vacation-from-hell comedy The Great Outdoors is merely mediocre." On Metacritic, the film has a score of 24 out of 100 based on 10 reviews, indicating "generally unfavorable reviews". Audiences polled by CinemaScore gave the film an average grade of "B+" on an A+ to F scale.

In her review in The New York Times, Janet Maslin reported that the film did not have enough collective energy to light a campfire. Kevin Thomas of the Los Angeles Times called the film "a crass, blah comedy about summer vacation perils" and said he was surprised the film got made at all. He described the end credits sequence where Aykroyd and Candy dance to Wilson Pickett's "Land of a Thousand Dances" as the only genuine fun and energy in the entire film. "Imagine that it's raining cats and dogs and you're locked in a north woods cabin for weeks with the people you like least, and you'll pretty much have a feel for what it's like to sit through this movie," said Hal Hinson of The Washington Post.

=== Box office ===
The film grossed $6,121,115 in its opening weekend and ended up with a North American domestic box office gross of $41,455,230, and a worldwide gross of $43,455,230.

== Reboot and sequel ==
In April 2017, Universal Pictures announced that a reboot of the film starring Kevin Hart and produced by Michael De Luca was in development.

In a November 2021 interview with The Hollywood Reporter, Aykroyd said that he was working on a sequel with Deutch titled The Great Outlaws that would "bring back Roman as a Ponzi scheme guy who victimizes a federal agent." In the interview, Aykroyd also said that he was "looking for the Candy figure" to cast in the film.
