= Fine Gold Creek =

River in California, United States

Fine Gold Creek Fine Gold
- Location in California Fine Gold Creek (the United States)

Location
- Country: United States
- State: California
- County: Madera County

Physical characteristics
- Source: Fine Gold
  - location: Thornberry Mountain
  - coordinates: 37°15′46″N 119°37′22″W
- 2nd source: North Fork Fine Gold
  - location: Thornberry Mountain
  - coordinates: 37°14′44″N 119°39′53″W
- 3rd source: Little Fine Gold
  - location: Goat Mountain
  - coordinates: 37°16′30″N 119°33′35″W
- Mouth: Millerton Lake
  - coordinates: 37°02′53″N 119°38′24″W
  - elevation: 191 metres (627 ft)
- Basin size: 90 square miles (23,000 ha)

Basin features
- Tributaries
  - left: North Fork Fine Gold Creek 37°11′46″N 119°37′01″W
  - right: Little Fine Gold Creek 37°11′46″N 119°37′01″W

Fine Gold Creek, in Fine Gold Gulch, is a creek in a gulch in Madera County, California that is a river tributary of the San Joaquin River. It is approximately 18 miles (29 km) from its mouth on the San Joaquin through where it has two forks to its headwaters.

Like Coarse Gold Gulch in the same county and many other places in California, its name derives simply from the practice of gold mining.

== Course and tributaries ==
The mouth of Fine Gold itself is roughly 3 miles (4.8 km) north-east of where Fort Miller used to be (which is now under Millerton Lake).

The headwaters of the main Creek are on the south slope of Thornberry Mountain at 4,000 feet (1,200 m) above sea level, and its course downstream is overall in a south-westwards direction to the San Joaquin with a fall of 3,600 feet (1,100 m) along its length downstream of its tributaries.

- Its major permanent tributaries are:
  - Little Fine Gold Creek — a fork whose headwaters are on the western slope of Goat Mountain, with a fall of 2,700 feet (820 m) along its length and flowing south-eastwards for 4 miles (6.4 km) then southwards for 2 miles (3.2 km) then south-westwards for its remaining 4 miles (6.4 km)
  - North Fork Fine Gold Creek — a 6 miles (9.7 km) long fork whose headwaters are west of Thornberry Mountain at 4,000 feet (1,200 m) above sea level, with a fall of 1,700 feet (520 m) along its length and flowing south-eastwards

Its minor tributaries are largely ephemeral, drying up in the summer. Most of its length comprises long lengths of sand-bottomed creek bed connecting a few rocky pools, which are between 1 and 2 metres deep in the summer months.

The total area of the Creek drainage basin is 90 square miles (23,000 ha), and the basin's northern boundary is at 4,400 feet (1,300 m) above sea level.

A reservoir on the Creek was considered in 2005, with water to be pumped from Millerton Lake or the San Joaquin, or even through a tunnel from Kerckhoff Lake, and supplemented by the inflow from Fine Gold itself. Madera Irrigation District had considered a similar project in 1991, and discarded it because of the pumping requirement.

== Ecology ==
The environs of Fine Gold comprise woodland foothills, mainly oak, digger pines, and willows, interspersed with occasional grassland and riparian habitat that includes Fraxinus latifolia, and various Populus, Salix, and Cephalanthus species. This is fairly well developed at the upstream end of the Creek.

Vegetation to be found in the streambed includes Polypogon monspeliensis, some Mimulus and Cyperus species, Mentha pulegium, and clover. Fish are mainly non-native species in the Creek basin, with the Sacramento sucker and hitch and the California roach found in the Creek.

The river banks have been damaged by grazing in places, and the grazing, local roads, and the construction of the Millerton Lake, from which fish like the green sunfish invade the Creek, have reduced the Creek's biodiversity. The whole watershed had been designated an Aquatic Diversity Management Area of the Sierra Nevada Ecosystem Project. At the mouth of the Creek, where it is inundated by Millerton Lake, the river banks are moderately steep.

There are eight special status plant species in the Creek watershed, and Ambystoma californiense, western spadefoot, and western pond turtle have been recorded there.

== Demographics and transport ==
The Creek watershed is sparsely populated, with access roads to farms, and scattered housing with mostly single-family homes. It is traversed by Hidden Lake Boulevard, Ralston Way, and County Road 210. Where it joins Millerton Lake, County Road 216 provides access to a small residential area named Hidden View, and Hidden Lake Estates.

=== Native people ===
The lower part of the Creek is part of the traditional territory of the Mono Native American people of North Fork, with the upper part in traditional Chukchansi Yokuts territory although the Chukchansi largely live nowadays in the Picayune Rancheria area at Coarsegold. There were Mono hamlets in the lower part. The Dalinchi Yokuts's traditional territory encompassed lower Fine Gold, O'Neals, and part of Coarse Gold Gulch, and the Dumna Yokuts's traditional territory ran along the north bank of the San Joaquin and included the mouth of Fine Gold.

== Archaeology ==
There are three known archaeological sites on the Creek, one a standing two-story house.

== Mining ==
Mining in the area is documented in Robert A. Eccleston's diary of the Mariposa War, and Eccleston himself mined there shortly after the war. Eccleston recorded little success, unlike N. H. Stockton who in September and October 1850 claimed to have made more than US$30 (equivalent to $1,161 in 2025) per day some days in his journal.

Fine Gold Creek divided the Hildreth Mining District on the west from the Fresno Mining District on the east.

In an 1894 survey, the California State Mining bureau recorded, amongst others:

- Quartz mines:
  - the Bessie H. Mine on Fine Gold operated by E. Wright of Pollasky
  - the Columbus Mine on North Fork operated by J. Morrison and F. Nîmes of Coarsegold
  - the Crabtree Mine on North Fork operated by T. Jones of Coarsegold
  - the Fine Gold Mine and the Starbuck Mine on Fine Gold operated by Mark Anderson of O'Neals, the former 3.5 miles (5.6 km) to the north-east of the O'Neals post office
  - the Henrietta Mine and Lottie K Mine on Fine Gold owned by J. A. Harris and W. Reed of Pollasky
  - the Margarite Mine on Fine Gold owned by Charles Baker et al. of O'Neals
  - the Pray Mine on Fine Gold owned by D. McLellan and Charles Melvin of Coarsegold
- Placer mines:
  - the Achsah D. Mine on Fine Gold operated by C. B. Holstead of Pollasky
  - the Bowdler Mine on Fine Gold operated by J. M. Bowles of Hildreth
  - the Combination Claim on Fine Gold operated by J. W. Strathan of Hildreth
  - Little Willie's Mine on Fine Gold owned by G. P. Gunter of Pollasky

== Sources ==
- Wood, Beatrice Dawson (1912). "Fine Gold Creek". Gazetteer of Surface Waters of California (PDF). U.S.G.S. Water-supply papers. California State Water Commission.
- Crawford, James John (1894). "Gold — Madera County". Mines and Mineral Resources of California. Report of the State Mineralogist. Vol. 12. Sacramento: California State Mining Bureau. pp. 153–167. (Report of the State Mineralogist at the Internet Archive)
- Gudde, Erwin G. (2009). "Fine Gold: Creek/Gulch". In Gudde, Elisabeth K. (ed.). California Gold Camps: A Geographical and Historical Dictionary of Camps, Towns, and Localities Where Gold Was Found and Mined; Wayside Stations and Trading Centers. University of California Press. ISBN 9780520261440.
- Gudde, Erwin G. (1998). "Gold". In Bright, William (ed.). California Place Names: The Origin and Etymology of Current Geographical Names. University of California Press. ISBN 9780520266193.
- Kyle, Douglas E.; Rensch, Hero Eugene; Rensch, Ethel Grace; Hoover, Mildred Brooke; Abeloe, William (2002). "Madera County". Historic Spots in California (5th ed.). Stanford University Press. ISBN 9780804778176.
- Upper San Joaquin River Basin Storage Investigation: Initial Alternatives Information Report. California Department of Water Resources. 2005.
- Surface Storage and Conveyance: Technical Appendix #6 to the Final Least-Cost CVP Yield Increase Plan. United States Department of the Interior Bureau of Reclamation. 1995. hdl:2027/uc1.31210025007095.
- Kroeber, Alfred Louis (1976). Handbook of the Indians of California. Bulletin. Vol. 78. Courier Corporation. ISBN 9780486233680.
