= Hughes Entertainment =

American film production company

- Type: Private
- Industry: Film
- Genre: Various
- Founded: 1983; 43 years ago in Chicago, United States
- Founder: John Hughes
- Defunct: 2002
- Fate: Closed
- Headquarters: Chicago, United States
- Products: Motion pictures

Hughes Entertainment (formerly The John Hughes Company) was an American film production company and music label founded in 1983 by filmmaker John Hughes. It was closed in 2002.

== History ==
The studio was founded in 1983 by American film producer John Hughes as The John Hughes Company after the success of Mr. Mom, with a three-picture deal at Universal Pictures. The contracts ended up being Sixteen Candles, The Breakfast Club and Weird Science.

The company signed a deal in 1984 with Universal Pictures, beyond the initial three-picture deal, through a three-year production agreement, in order to produce, direct and write two to three pictures a year in order to develop from their own development ideas. The company was subsequently moved to Paramount Pictures in 1985. The company made some successes with Pretty in Pink and Ferris Bueller's Day Off.

Tom Jacobson started working for the company in the mid 1980s before he left for 20th Century Fox in 1989. The company then spent various deals at Warner Bros. and 20th Century Fox throughout the end of the late 1980s and early to mid-1990s. The company produced films such as Curly Sue, Home Alone and Miracle on 34th Street.

In 1995, Hughes partnered with Ricardo Mestres, under Ricardo Mestres Productions to form a new company label Great Oaks Entertainment, with a first-look development deal at The Walt Disney Studios. Under the deal, the company made remakes of 101 Dalmatians and Flubber. The relationship broke up in 1997 with Hughes Entertainment resuming active operations, operating at The Walt Disney Studios.

== Films ==
List of films that were produced by Hughes Entertainment:

| Year | Title | Director | Distributor | Co-production companies | Budget | Gross |
|---|---|---|---|---|---|---|
| 1984 | Sixteen Candles | John Hughes | Universal Pictures | Channel Productions; uncredited | $6.5 million | $23.6 million |
| 1985 | The Breakfast Club | John Hughes | Universal Pictures | A&M Films and Channel Productions; uncredited | $1 million | $51.5 million |
| 1985 | Weird Science | John Hughes | Universal Pictures | Silver Pictures; uncredited | $7.5 million | $38.9 million |
| 1986 | Pretty in Pink | Howard Deutch | Paramount Pictures | uncredited | $9 million | $40.5 million |
| 1986 | Ferris Bueller's Day Off | John Hughes | Paramount Pictures | uncredited | $5 million | $70.5 million |
| 1987 | Some Kind of Wonderful | Howard Deutch | Paramount Pictures | N/A | | $18.5 million |
| 1987 | Planes, Trains & Automobiles | John Hughes | Paramount Pictures | N/A | $30 million | $49.5 million |
| 1988 | She's Having a Baby | John Hughes | Paramount Pictures | N/A | $20 million | $16 million (domestic) |
| 1988 | The Great Outdoors | Howard Deutch | Universal Pictures | N/A | $24 million | $43.4 million |
| 1989 | Uncle Buck | John Hughes | Universal Pictures | N/A | $15 million | $79.2 million |
| 1989 | National Lampoon's Christmas Vacation | Jeremiah S. Chechik | Warner Bros. | N/A | $25 million | $71.3 Million |
| 1990 | Home Alone | Chris Columbus | 20th Century Fox | N/A | $18 million | $476.7 million |
| 1991 | Career Opportunities | Bryan Gordon | Universal Pictures | N/A | | $11.3 million |
| 1991 | Only the Lonely | Chris Columbus | 20th Century Fox | N/A | | $25 million |
| 1991 | Dutch | Peter Faiman | 20th Century Fox | N/A | $17 million | $4.6 million |
| 1991 | Curly Sue | John Hughes | Warner Bros. | N/A | $25 million | $33.7 million |
| 1992 | Home Alone 2: Lost in New York | Chris Columbus | 20th Century Fox | N/A | $28 million | $359 million |
| 1993 | Dennis the Menace | Nick Castle | Warner Bros. | Hank Ketcham Enterprises | $35 million | $117.2 million |
| 1994 | Miracle on 34th Street | Les Mayfield | 20th Century Fox | Fox Family Films | | $46.3 million |
| 1994 | Baby's Day Out | Patrick Read Johnson | 20th Century Fox | N/A | $48 million | $16.7 million |
| 1996 | 101 Dalmatians | Stephen Herek | Buena Vista Pictures | Walt Disney Pictures; as Great Oaks Entertainment | $67 million | $320.7 million |
| 1997 | Flubber | Les Mayfield | Buena Vista Pictures | Walt Disney Pictures; as Great Oaks Entertainment | $50-80 million | $170 million |
| 1997 | Home Alone 3 | Raja Gosnell | 20th Century Fox | Fox Family Films | $32 million | $79.1 million |
| 1998 | Reach the Rock | William Ryan | Universal Pictures | Gramercy Pictures; uncredited | | $4,960 |
| 2001 | Just Visiting | Jean-Marie Poiré | Buena Vista Pictures | Hollywood Pictures and Gaumont; uncredited | $35 million | $16.2 million |
| 2001 | New Port South | Kyle Cooper | Buena Vista Pictures | Touchstone Pictures | | |
| 2002 | Maid in Manhattan | Wayne Wang | Sony Pictures Releasing | Columbia Pictures, Revolution Studios, and Red Om Films; uncredited | $55 million | $163 million |
