= Goat Mountain (Madera County, California) =

Mountain in Madera County, California

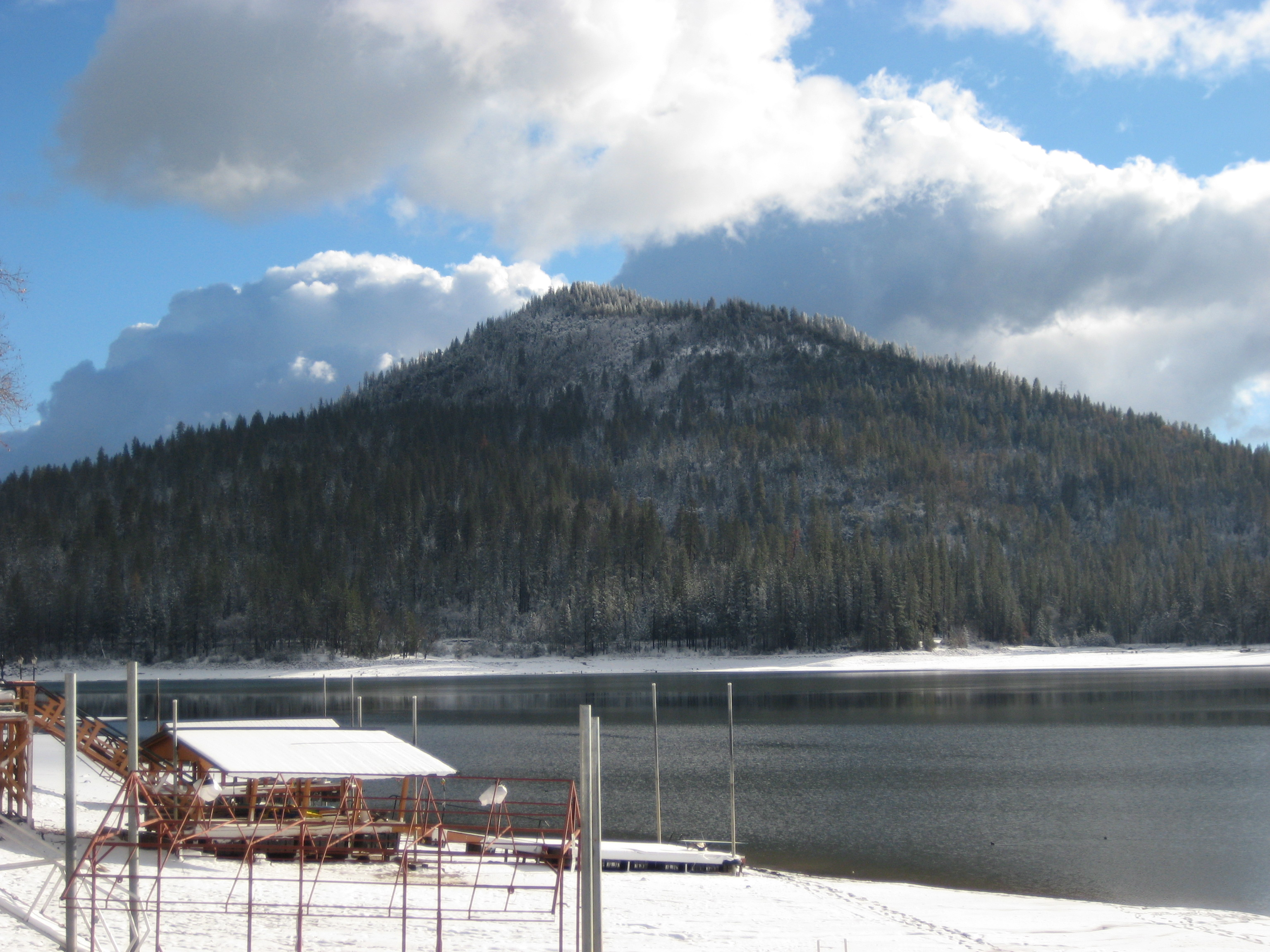
- Goat Mountain viewed from Bass Lake

Highest point
- Elevation: 4,967 ft (1,514 m)
- Coordinates: 37.2949453°N 119.5651418°W

Geography
- Location in California Goat Mountain (the United States)
- Location: Madera County, California, U.S.
- Parent range: Sierra Nevada
- Topo map: USGS Bass Lake

Goat Mountain is a mountain in Madera County, California, in the Sierra National Forest on the western slope of the Sierra Nevada. Its summit has an elevation of approximately 4,967 feet (1,514 m). The mountain rises west of Bass Lake and includes a historic fire lookout on its southern portion.

== Geography and geology ==
Goat Mountain lies south and west of Bass Lake in the Bass Lake Ranger District of the Sierra National Forest. Little Fine Gold Creek rises on the mountain's western slope at an elevation of approximately 4,000 feet (1,200 m). A 1912 United States Geological Survey gazetteer described the creek as flowing approximately 10 miles (16 km) before joining Fine Gold Creek.

Goat Mountain contains quartzite, a remnant of older metamorphic rock surrounded by the granitic rocks of the Sierra Nevada batholith. A 1992 USGS study described the Goat Mountain quartzite as similar to that at Pilot Ridge and as part of a chain of metamorphic remnants extending through the central Sierra Nevada.

== Name ==
The origin of the name Goat Mountain is uncertain. A 1961 local history in the Madera Tribune credited pioneer Robert Laramore with naming the mountain. Other accounts attribute the name to goats used during construction of the Bass Lake dam. After helping compact soil around the dam, the goats were released and reportedly moved onto the mountain.

The name was in federal use by 1912, when the United States Geological Survey referred to Goat Mountain in its gazetteer of the San Joaquin River basin.

== Fire lookout ==
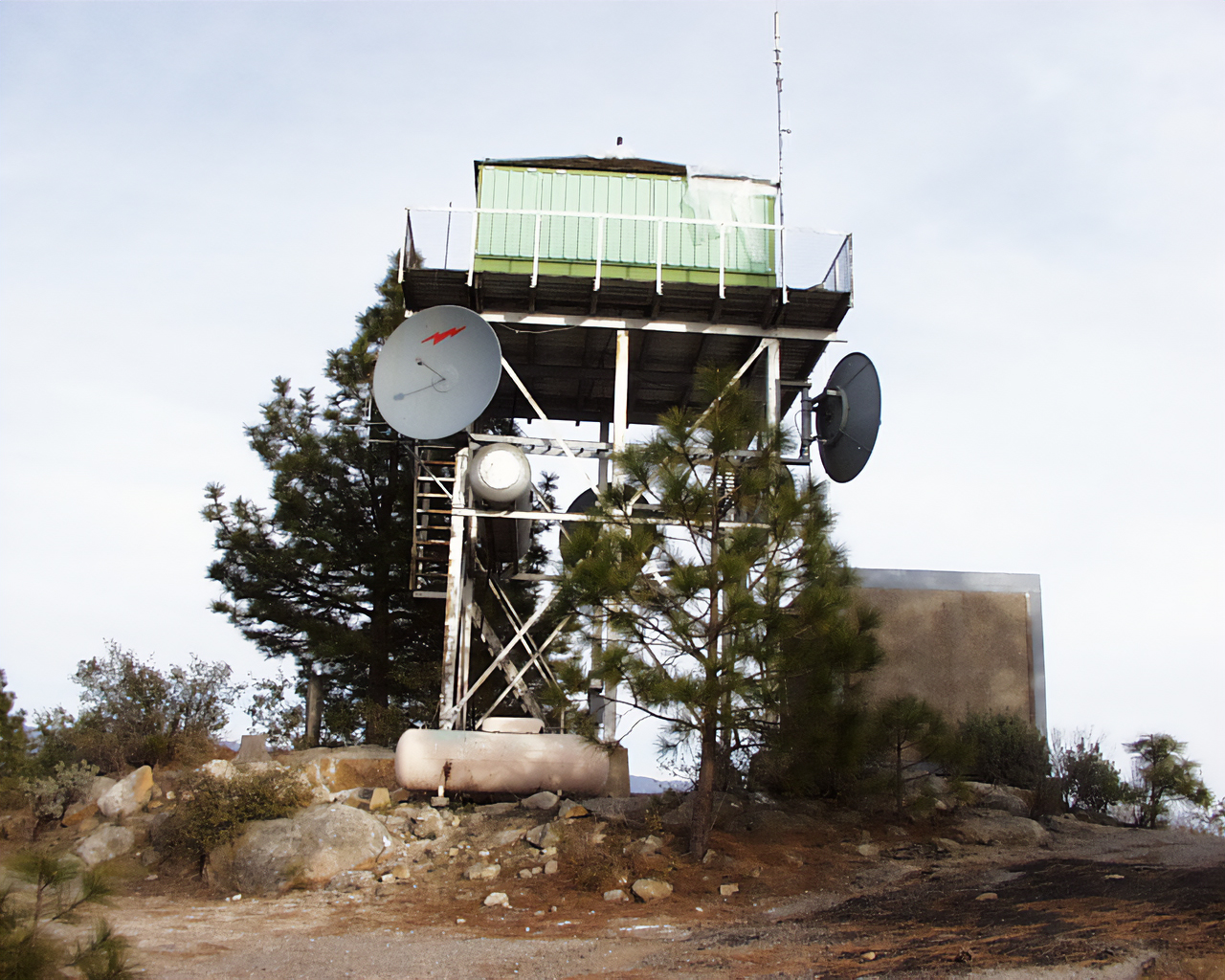
Goat Mountain Lookout, Bass Lake, California.

A fire lookout site was established on the southern part of Goat Mountain by 1915 or earlier. A cabin constructed there in 1915 was destroyed by wind during the winter of 1915–16. The lookout was reconstructed in 1934 and again in 1935 after winds shifted the tower on its base. The resulting structure consists of an L-4 hip-roof cab on a 20-foot (6.1 m) steel tower.

The lookout was added to the National Historic Lookout Register on April 21, 1999, as lookout number 303. A 2013 Forest Service assessment identified the Goat Mountain Fire Lookout as an isolated historic building within the Sierra National Forest. The tower is no longer used for fire detection and is maintained as a Forest Service radio relay site.

== Recreation ==
The Goat Mountain and Spring Cove trails ascend the mountain from the Bass Lake area and provide access toward the fire lookout. In 1995, the Los Angeles Times described the Goat Mountain Lookout Trail as one of three principal hiking trails around Bass Lake and gave the route to the lookout as approximately 5 miles (8.0 km) round trip.

== Ecology and forest management ==
A 2004 Forest Service survey reported continued western pine beetle activity on the east side of Goat Mountain near Bass Lake.

In 2025, the Sierra Nevada Conservancy approved funding for reconstruction of the Goat Mountain section of the Joint Chiefs' Fuel Break. The project would reconstruct a 4.7-mile (7.6 km) east–west fuel break across approximately 300 acres (120 ha) of Sierra National Forest land south of Bass Lake using mechanical and hand treatments and pile burning.
