= Willow Creek (Madera County, California) =

Californian river

Coordinates: 37.2138°N 119.4976°W

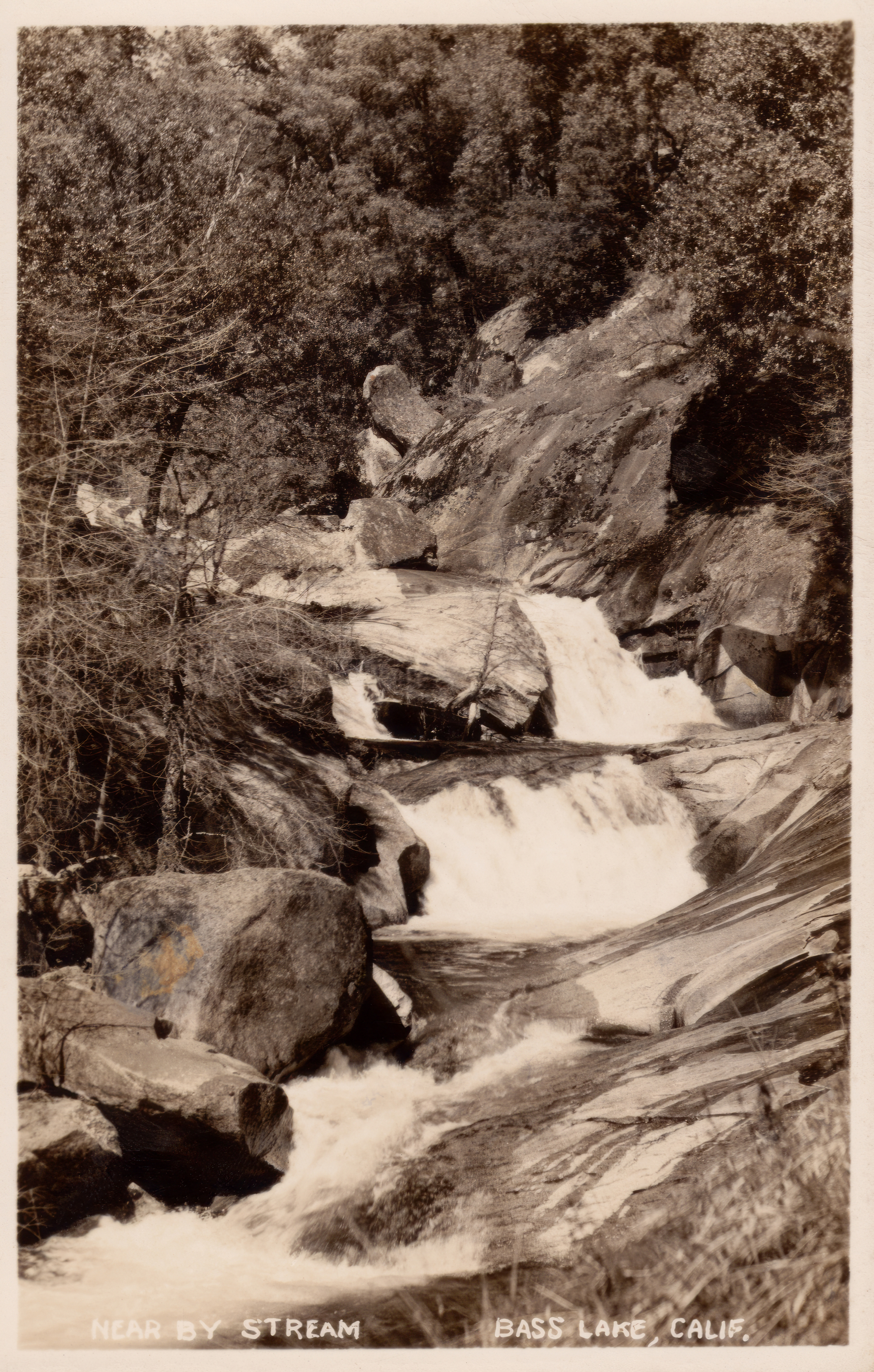
Willow Creek in Madera County, California.

Willow Creek is a tributary of the upper San Joaquin River in Madera County, California, on the western slope of the Sierra Nevada. Its North Fork is impounded by Crane Valley Dam to form Bass Lake, within the Sierra National Forest. The creek is part of the Crane Valley hydroelectric system and is also used for water supply and recreation. Along its upper course are the cascades known as Angel Falls and Devil's Slide.

== Course and geography ==
The headwaters of the North Fork of Willow Creek are near White Chief Mountain at an elevation of about 8,676 feet (2,644 m) on the western slope of the Sierra Nevada. The North Fork flows southwest through the Sierra National Forest and is impounded by Crane Valley Dam to form Bass Lake. Chilkoot Creek, which drains Chilkoot Lake, joins the North Fork upstream of the reservoir.

Water from Brown's Creek, a tributary of the South Fork, is diverted into Bass Lake through the Browns Creek Diversion Dam and conduit. Below Bass Lake, the North Fork passes through the community of North Fork before joining the South Fork. From their confluence, Willow Creek flows about 6.3 miles (10.1 km) to the San Joaquin River.

Flows in the North Fork, South Fork, and main stem are substantially regulated by reservoirs, diversions, and hydroelectric facilities of the Crane Valley Project.

== History and development ==
The Willow Creek basin lies within the traditional territory of the North Fork Mono and Chukchansi Yokuts peoples. Ethnographic studies have recorded Mono campsites in the Crane Valley area and traditional plant-gathering areas along the North and South forks of Willow Creek.

During the late 19th century, water from Willow Creek was diverted through ditches and flumes associated with logging operations in the surrounding mountains. The upper watershed became part of the Sierra Forest Reserve when it was established in 1893; the reserve was later administered as part of the Sierra National Forest.

Hydroelectric development began in 1901, when the San Joaquin Electric Company constructed a dam on the North Fork and created Crane Valley Reservoir. The dam was enlarged in 1910, forming the present Bass Lake. Bass Lake is the principal storage reservoir of the Crane Valley Hydroelectric Project, whose water passes through five powerhouses before reaching the San Joaquin River.

Willow Creek also supplies drinking water to the Bass Lake community. In 2019, California American Water agreed to purchase the Bass Lake Water Company system, which included a surface-water intake on the North Fork. The acquisition was completed in August 2025.

== Recreation ==
The Willow Creek Trail begins near the Falls Day Use Area at Bass Lake and follows the North Fork upstream. The trail passes Angel Falls and Devil's Slide, two cascades along the creek, before continuing into the Sierra National Forest.

The cascades and surrounding granite have also been the site of repeated accidents and fatalities. By 2000, the Forest Service had recorded several deaths from visitors falling into Willow Creek and had posted warning signs along the trail. Accidents have continued in subsequent years, including the drowning of a man near Angel Falls in 2020 and two drownings there in 2024.

== Ecology ==
Streamflow in Willow Creek has been substantially altered by the reservoirs, diversions, and hydroelectric facilities of the Crane Valley Project. Below the confluence of the North and South forks, portions of Willow Creek may have little or no flow during the summer. Lower Willow Creek supports a warm-water fish community that includes native species such as Sacramento sucker and hardhead, while trout occur in the upper watershed.

Willow Creek is listed under section 303(d) of the Clean Water Act for water-temperature impairment. California's 2026 Integrated Report retained the creek on the list, with protection of cold freshwater habitat identified as the affected beneficial use.

== See also ==
- Bass Lake (Madera County, California)
- San Joaquin River
- Crane Valley Dam
