= Badger Pass (Pioneer Mountains) =

Pass in the Rocky Mountains, Montana, USA

- Interactive map of Badger Pass
- Elevation: 6,755 ft (2,059 m)
- Traversed by: Montana State Highway 278

Third Approach
- Location: Beaverhead County, Montana, United States
- Range: Rocky Mountains
- Coordinates: 45°14′02″N 112°57′01″W

Badger Pass (el. 6755 ft.) is a high mountain pass in Beaverhead County, Montana. It is located between Bannack, Montana and Dillon, and traversed by Montana Secondary Highway 278.

The Badger Pass Mine is located at 45.21659 and W -112.95087. A "miniature gold rush" took place in the 1930s, with the discovery of an unusual sandstone formation on both sides of Badger Pass Road which turned out to contain gold, and was valued "as high as $42 a ton."

The Badger claim is in the SE1/4 of section 26, T6S, R11W, north of the Ermont No. 19 shaft. It was claimed during the 1932 gold rush by Hurly Leach and D. V. Erwin. The mine was developed by an inclined shaft at least 110 feet deep into a silicified replacement body in Jefferson Dolomite. The mine was worked from 1933 to 1936 and again in 1941. Total production was 859 tons containing 330 ounces of gold, 123 ounces of silver and 102 pounds of copper.
