= Sierra Forest Reserve =

Federal reserve in the Sierra Nevada, California, U.S.

The Sierra Forest Reserve was a federal reserve in the Sierra Nevada, in eastern California. It was established on February 14, 1893, by President Benjamin Harrison with authorization from section 24 of the Forest Reserve Act of 1891. It was the largest reserve with over 4 million acres (16,000 km^{2}), and was the second reserve established in California. The first was the San Gabriel Timberland Reserve.

== Initiation ==
The Sierra Reserve beginnings, like the San Gabriel Reserve, were by petitions sent to the US Congress from Tulare County officials wanting to stop the damage in the Sierra Nevada by timber and livestock commercial interests.

The United States General Land Office which was responsible for management of public lands, sent Benjamin Allen to investigate and report back, which he did, recommending a set aside of land called Tulare Reserve. He originally had five million acres (20,000 km^{2}) to six million acres (24,000 km^{2}) for this reserve in his report.

== Support ==
The majority of local citizens were supportive, any protests heard were coming from the sheepmen. Conservationist and later Venice, California founder Abbot Kinney and Century magazine editor Robert Underwood Johnson gave their support of the proposed set aside.

== Establishment ==
Benjamin Allen, in his final report, reduced the size and changed the name to Sierra Forest Reserve. The new reserve bordered most of Yosemite National Park with its western boundary almost surrounding General Grant and Sequoia national parks. Its lands are now primarily part of the Sierra National Forest.

== Footnotes ==
=== References ===
Godfrey, Anthony The Ever-Changing View-A History of the National Forests in California USDA Forest Service Publishers, 2005 ISBN 1-59351-428-X

== See also ==
- Sierra National Forest
- Sequoia National Forest
- Inyo National Forest
