= Bass Lake (Madera County, California) =

Lake

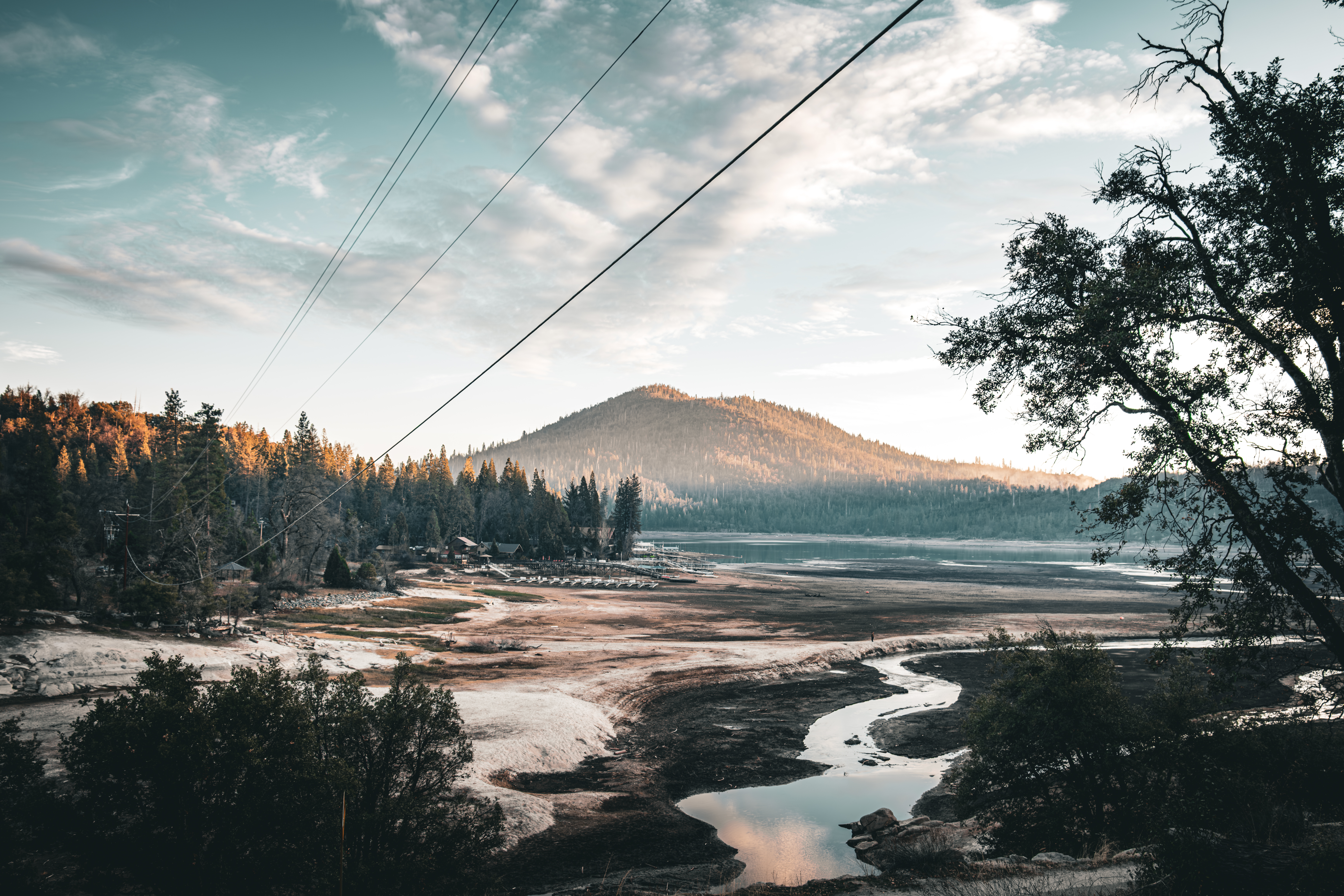

- Location within California Location within the United States
- Location: Sierra National Forest; Madera County, California
- Coordinates: 37.29077°N 119.52513°W
- Type: Reservoir
- Primary inflows: Willow Creek Browns Creek Ditch
- Primary outflows: Willow Creek
- Basin countries: United States
- Max. length: 6.7 km (4.2 mi)
- Max. width: 0.64 km (0.40 mi)
- Surface area: 472 ha (1,170 acres)
- Max. depth: 30 m (98 ft)
- Water volume: 56,100 dam^{3} (45,500 acre⋅ft)
- Surface elevation: 1,027 m (3,369 ft)
- Settlements: Bass Lake, California
- Website: https://www.basslake.com/

Bass Lake, formerly known as Crane Valley Reservoir, is a reservoir in Madera County, California, within the Sierra National Forest. It lies on North Fork Willow Creek, a tributary of the San Joaquin River, approximately 14 miles (23 km) south of Yosemite National Park. The communities of Bass Lake and Wishon are located along its shoreline.

The reservoir originated in 1901, when the San Joaquin Electric Company dammed North Fork Willow Creek for hydroelectric power generation. A larger Crane Valley Dam was constructed beginning in 1909 and completed in 1910, incorporating the earlier dam into a 145-foot (44 m) hydraulic-fill structure. The dam is now owned by Pacific Gas and Electric Company and forms part of the Crane Valley Hydroelectric Project.

== History ==
The name "Crane Valley" dates to 1851, when members of the Mariposa Battalion saw great blue herons in the valley and mistook them for cranes.

Plans to use Willow Creek for hydroelectric generation began in 1895. The San Joaquin Electric Company subsequently built an earthen dam across the creek in 1901, creating Crane Valley Reservoir. San Joaquin Light & Power Corporation acquired the company in 1902, enlarged the dam in 1905, and constructed the present 145-foot (44 m) dam in 1910.

The reservoir was known as Crane Valley Reservoir for several decades. The name Bass Lake came into local use after pollution from a lumber operation killed the reservoir's fish and the company was required to restock it. Bass were selected as the replacement fish.

== Crane Valley Dam ==
Crane Valley Dam is a 145-foot (44 m) hydraulic-fill dam with a crest approximately 1,900 feet (580 m) long.

Seismic stability studies conducted in 2005 and 2006 found that the dam's hydraulic-fill embankments could undergo substantial deformation during a major earthquake. Between 2009 and 2012, PG&E carried out a seismic retrofit that added rock-fill buttresses to the upstream and downstream slopes, improved internal drainage, reinforced portions of the concrete core wall, and raised the dam crest by about 8 feet (2.4 m).

== Hydroelectric operations ==
Bass Lake is the principal storage reservoir of the Crane Valley Hydroelectric Project. The project consists of five hydroelectric developments: Crane Valley, San Joaquin No. 3, San Joaquin No. 2, San Joaquin No. 1A, and A.G. Wishon. Together, the five powerhouses have an installed generating capacity of 28.7 megawatts (38,500 hp).

Water released from Bass Lake passes through the Crane Valley Powerhouse and then through a series of conduits, forebays, and downstream powerhouses before reaching the San Joaquin River. Reservoir operations also reflect downstream irrigation requirements and seasonal recreation at Bass Lake. The 2003 FERC license requires a Bass Lake level-management plan and includes provisions for minimum streamflows, recreation facilities, habitat protection, and public access.

In 2020, PG&E announced plans to sell the Crane Valley Hydroelectric Project, citing the increasing cost of operating the facilities and reduced economic value of the project to its customers.

== Ecology and fisheries ==
=== Fish ===
Bass Lake supports a recreational fishery that includes rainbow trout, kokanee salmon, black bass, black crappie, sunfish, and catfish. The California Department of Fish and Wildlife stocks rainbow trout in the reservoir.

Fisheries management has also included efforts to reduce non-game fish populations. In 1950, state and federal agencies began a program to remove rough fish to improve conditions for game fish.

=== Streamflow ===
Operation of Crane Valley Dam regulates flow in North Fork Willow Creek below Bass Lake. Under the 2003 federal hydroelectric license, PG&E is required to maintain a year-round minimum flow of 2 cubic feet per second (57 L/s) below the dam. The license also requires fish monitoring in project-affected reaches of the Willow Creek drainage. Required streamflows are intended to support trout habitat below Bass Lake and maintain habitat and passage for native fish, including hardhead and Sacramento suckers, farther downstream.

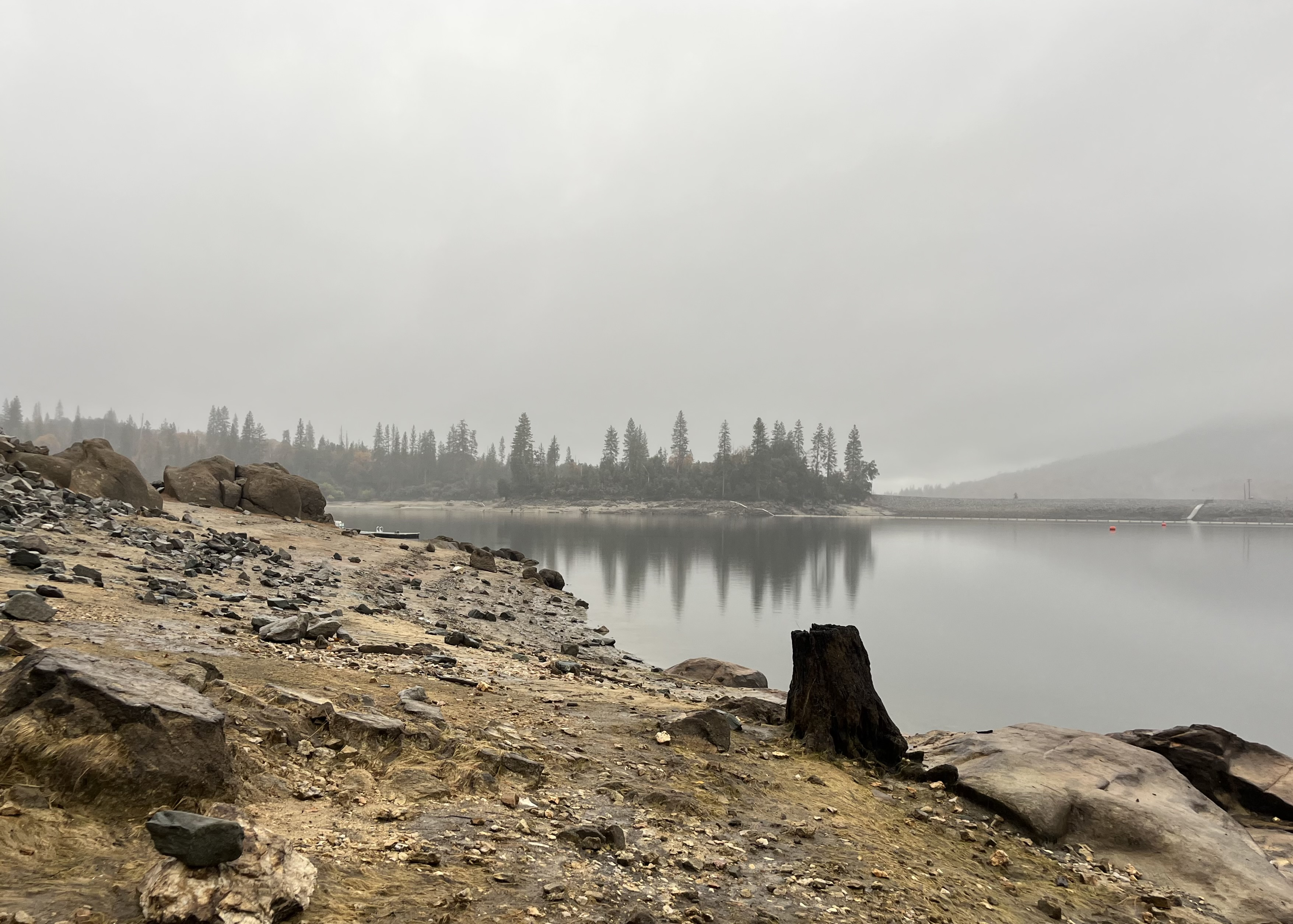
Bass Lake and Crane Valley Dam in November 2024

=== Water quality ===
Bass Lake has been evaluated by the California State Water Resources Control Board for mercury and other contaminants in water and fish tissue. The state has not placed the reservoir on the Clean Water Act section 303(d) list for mercury based on the available evidence, although some fish-tissue samples have exceeded mercury objectives.

In December 2025, the California Office of Environmental Health Hazard Assessment issued a fish-consumption advisory for Bass Lake based on mercury concentrations. The advisory provides separate consumption recommendations for black bass, crappie, kokanee salmon, rainbow trout, and sunfish.

== Drought and high-water events ==
During the California drought of the mid-2010s, water levels at Bass Lake fell well below normal summer levels. In 2015, the lake was approximately 17 feet (5.2 m) below its normal summer elevation, leaving some docks and shoreline facilities without direct water access. Local businesses reported substantial declines in tourism during the drought years of 2014 and 2015.

Conditions reversed during the wet winter of 2016–2017. During an atmospheric-river storm in January 2017, rapid inflows into Bass Lake led PG&E to increase releases from Crane Valley Dam. The higher downstream flows contributed to flooding along Willow Creek and evacuations in low-lying areas of North Fork.
