= Shinn =

Shinn may refer to:

== Places ==
- Shinn, Fremont, California
- Mount Shinn
- Mount Shinn (California)
- Horace J. and Ann S. Shinn Cottage

== People with the surname ==
- Anne O'Hagan Shinn (1869–1933), American journalist
- Blake Shinn (born 1987), Australian jockey
- Brenda Shinn (born 1962), American sport shooter
- Charles Howard Shinn (1852–1924), American forester and author
- Chris Shinn (born 1974), American singer-songwriter
- Christopher Shinn (born 1975), American playwright
- David H. Shinn (born 1940), American diplomat
- Don Shinn (1945–2023), English musician
- Earl Shinn (1838–1886), American art critic
- Emma Shinn, American soldier and attorney
- Everett Shinn (1876–1953), American painter
- Florence Scovel Shinn (1871–1940), American artist and book illustrator
- George Shinn (born 1941), American entrepreneur and former owner of the Charlotte/New Orleans (NBA) Hornets
- Jacob L. Shinn (1826—1899) prosperous and influential mid to late-nineteenth-century leader in Russellville, Pope County, Arkansas
- James J. Shinn (born 1951), American government official
- James Richard Shinn, American rare book thief
- Larry Shinn, (born 1942), President of Berea College from 1994 to 2012
- Michelle Shinn, American laser scientist
- Milicent Shinn (1858–1940), American child psychologist
- Moses F. Shinn (1809–1885), American minister
- Nick Shinn (born 1952), English font designer
- Robert C. Shinn Jr. (1937–2023), American politician
- Roger L. Shinn (1917–2013), American theologian
- Sharon Shinn (born 1957), American novelist
- Suzy Shinn (born 1994), American songwriter
- W. A. Shinn, American politician
- William Norton Shinn (1782–1871), American politician

== Other uses ==
- Ógra Shinn Féin, youth wing of the Irish political party Sinn Féin
- Shinn Asuka, fictional character
- George and Eulalie Shinn, fictional characters in the musical and movie The Music Man
