= Powellton =

Powellton or Powelton may refer to:

- Powellton, California
- Powelton, Georgia
- Powellton, Illinois
- Powelton Club, a golf course in Balmville, New York
- Powelton Village, Philadelphia, Pennsylvania
  - The Powelton, a historic apartment complex in Powelton Village
- Powellton, Virginia
- Powellton, West Virginia
