= Thaddeus L. Bolton =

American psychologist (1865–1948)

- Born: Thaddeus Lincoln Bolton; July 27, 1865; Sonora, Illinois
- Died: January 3, 1948 (aged 82); Temple University Hospital; Philadelphia, Pennsylvania
- Education: University of Michigan; University of Washington; University of Nebraska; Tempe Normal School; University of Montana; Clark University
- Spouse: Martha Louise Busse
- Scientific career
- Fields: Psychology
- Institutions: San Jose State College; Temple University
- Thesis: Rhythm (1895)
- Academic advisors: Edmund Sanford

Thaddeus Lincoln Bolton (July 27, 1865 – January 3, 1948) was an American psychologist who was head of the Department of Psychology at Temple University for twenty years. In February 1947, about a year before his death, he set aside $61,000 in a trust fund to establish the Thaddeus L. Bolton Professorship at Temple.

== Early life and education ==
Bolton was born on July 27, 1865, in Sonora, Illinois, to William and Amelia Dortt Bolton. He attended Mount Morris Academy before enrolling at the University of Michigan at the age of 21. He received his A.B. degree from the University of Michigan in 1889. He then worked in school administration for a year before enrolling in the psychology program at Clark University, where his main mentor was Edmund Sanford. He received his Ph.D. from Clark in 1895, with what has been identified as the first Ph.D. thesis on a music education-related topic. This thesis also influenced Philip C. Hayden's subsequent musical teachings.

== Career ==
In 1894, Bolton began his first academic position at the Worcester Normal School, where he remained for one year. In 1895, he joined the faculty of San Jose State College, where he also remained for a single year. He then held stints at the University of Washington and several universities in Germany. In 1899, he returned to the United States to become an instructor at the University of Nebraska, where he became a professor in 1904. In the spring of 1908, he resigned from the University of Nebraska, and soon afterward joined the Tempe Normal School, where he founded and edited the Arizona Journal of Education. In 1912, he joined the faculty of the University of Montana as chair of psychology. He later joined the faculty of Temple University in the 1917–1918 school year, and was named the founding chairman of their Department of Psychology in 1924. He remained a professor at Temple until he retired in 1937, whereupon he became an emeritus professor there. In 1933, he was elected the first acting president of the Pennsylvania Association of Clinical Psychologists, now known as the Pennsylvania Psychological Association. He was a member of Sigma Xi and the American Psychological Association, among other groups.

== Work ==
Bolton's research included studies on fatigue, rhythm, and intelligence, among numerous other psychological topics. He was quoted in the media speculating on the reasons for the popularity of newspapers and the prevalence of laughter among non-human animals.

== Death ==
Bolton died on January 3, 1948, at Temple University Hospital. He was survived by his widow, Martha Louise Busse, as well as by a sister and a brother.
