= David Dozier =

American academic

David M. Dozier
- Occupation: Professor
- Website: daviddozierbooks.com

David Michael Dozier (born March 30, 1949) is an American academic who is professor emeritus of journalism and media studies at San Diego State University (SDSU).

== Biography ==
Dozier was raised in North Fork, California, where he befriended the serial killer Edmund Kemper. His childhood friendship with Kemper later led him to author a novel, The California Killing Field, about a fictional murderer. Dozier received a Ph.D. in communication research from Stanford University and went on to teach public relations at SDSU.

Dozier is a past recipient of the Outstanding Educator Award and the Lloyd B. Dennis Award, both from the Public Relations Society of America, and the Norma B. Connelly Public Affairs Service Award from the United States Navy Public Affairs Association.

Dozier is a death penalty abolitionist.
