= Lilian Bridgman =

American architect (1866–1948)

Lilian Belle Bridgman
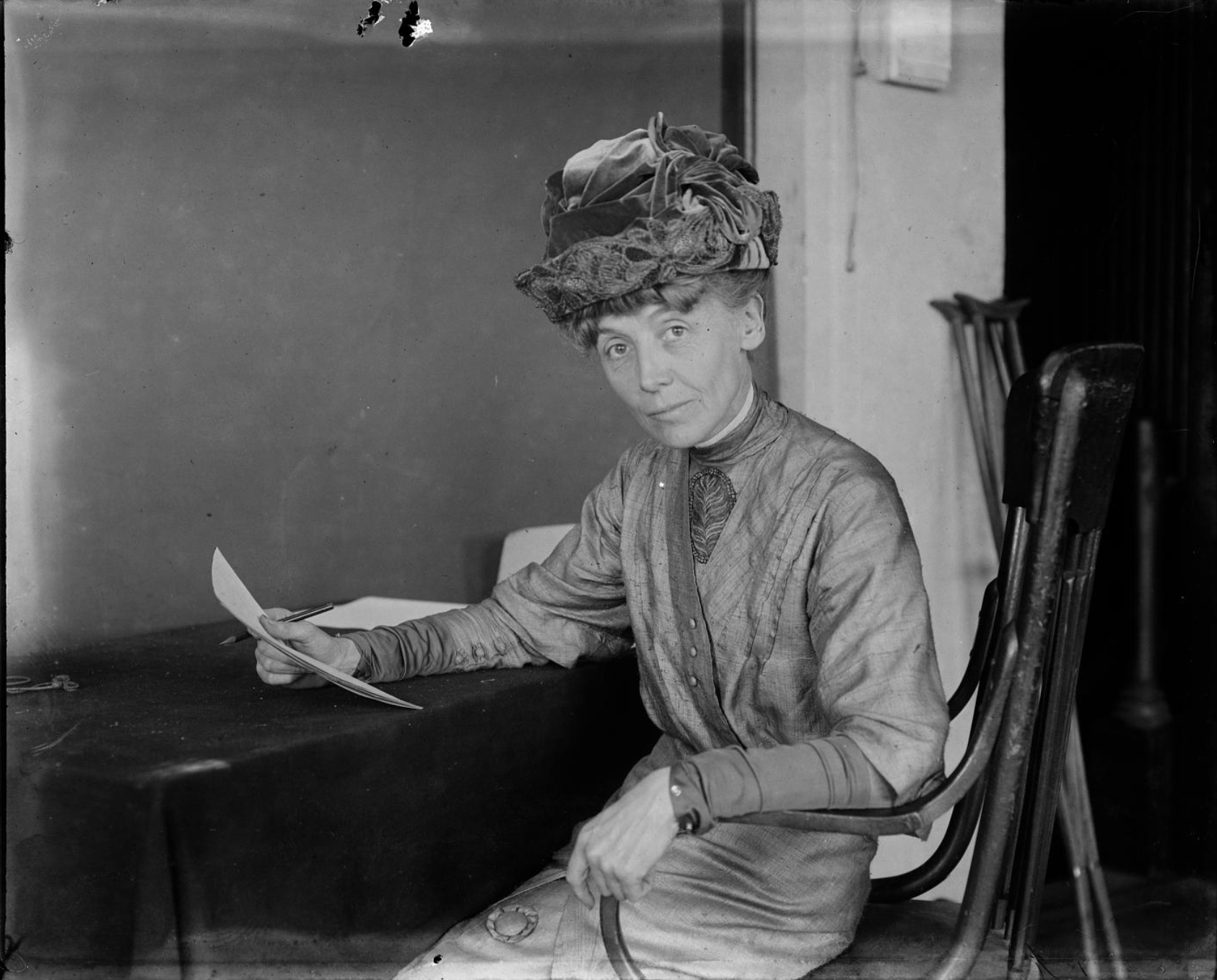
- Born: 1866
- Died: 1948 (aged 81–82)
- Other name: Lillie Bridgman
- Education: Cornell University; Kansas State Agricultural College; University of California, Berkeley
- Occupations: Architect, educator, scientist, writer

Lilian "Lillie" Belle Bridgman (1866–1948) was an American architect, educator, writer, and scientist. After working first as a science teacher and writer, she changed her profession in mid-life and followed her dream of becoming an architect.

== First career as a science teacher and writer ==
Bridgman was originally from Kansas. A childhood accident resulted in a broken leg and contributed to a lifelong impairment that required her to use a crutch. She obtained her science degree in 1888 from Kansas State Agricultural College. She was impressed by a textbook by professor Joseph LeConte of the University of California, Berkeley and decided to study science under him, earning a master's degree in 1893.

After graduation, she taught physics and chemistry at several schools in California, including the California School of Mechanical Arts, between 1893 and 1910. She was also a writer, authoring short stories and poems which were published in popular journals.

In 1898, she enrolled for further graduate studies at Cornell University but fell seriously ill and had to drop out. During her recovery, she dreamt of building her own house and was encouraged by her friend, architect Bernard Maybeck, to sketch her ideas. After buying a small property near Blackberry Canyon in Berkeley with an inheritance, she hired an architect, William Knowles, to prepare the construction drawings. The House focuses on natural light and views of the San Francisco Bay. The home's exterior is clad with brown shingles as typical for First Bay Tradition houses. The interior featured local unpainted redwood paneling and built-in window seats that could be transformed into beds for visitors. In 1908, she added a studio on the upper part of the property which would later serve as her architectural office. For many years, Lillian Bridgman lived with her sister, Irene, a nurse, sometimes staying in the studio and renting out the front house to boarders.

== Second career as an architect ==
After this first architectural experience and being frustrated with her low-paying job as a female science teacher, Bridgman started her second career and, at the age of 44, quit her job and enrolled from 1910 to 1912 at the University of California to study architecture. After having gained practical experience as a draftsperson in the office of Walter Ratcliff, she became a certified architect in California in 1915 and opened her own office in downtown Berkeley in the First National Bank building.

Not uncommon for beginning practitioners, her clients were family members, friends or word-of-mouth referrals, often women of her large circle of friends. She received one of her first major commissions, the Orchard Cottage for Milicent Shinn in Niles, California (today Fremont) in 1916.

Her early work is strongly influenced by the philosophy of the Hillside Club of which she was a founding member. The Club promoted a rustic architecture to enhance the natural setting of the North Side of Berkeley. The ideas were published in 1904 by Charles Keeler in a booklet The Simple Home.

After the 1923 Berkeley Fire, Lilian Bridgman was among the architects involved in the rebuilding of Berkeley. She used the Hotel Whitecotton as a meeting place with clients. The Fire led to a change in building materials from shingled walls and cedar shake roofs to the use of stucco and tile roofs which can also be observed in the architecture of Bridgman.

Lilian Bridgman not only contributed to the environment of Berkeley with her simple and harmonious houses, but was also involved in the community and lectured to educate the public about building homes. One example is her lecture Art in House Building in Relation to the Community and to Purposes of a Home which she presented to the College Women's Club. She was also active in the Association of Collegiate Alumnae (now the Association of American University Women AAUW) and the National Housing Association and served on their national committees.

== Bridgman's Work ==
Some of her houses, a few with built-in furniture, are:

- Lilian Bridgman House, 1715 La Loma Avenue, Berkeley (with architects Bernard Maybeck and William Knowles, 1899-1900)
- Lilian Bridgman Studio, 1715A La Loma Avenue, Berkeley (1908)
- Mary Blossom Davidson House, 1404 Le Roy Avenue, Berkeley, (1918)
- Milicent Washburn Shinn House, 1119 Mowry Avenue, Fremont (1918)
- Professor and Mrs. Frederic T. Bioletti House, 2440 Martinez Avenue, Berkeley (1920)
- Kate Rawlinson Gompertz, M.D. House, 1236 Bonita Avenue, Berkeley, (1920)
- Jennie Vennerstrom Cannon Studio, 1629 La Vereda Avenue, Berkeley (1922)
- J.C. Dort House, 2511 Hill Court, Berkeley, (1922)
- Mr. and Mrs. Frederic T. Bioletti, 1020 Cragmont Avenue, Berkeley, (1922–23) rebuilding of the original house destroyed in the 1923 Fire.
- Mary Blossom Davidson House, rebuilding of the original after the 1923 Fire,(1924)
- Hill House, Jewelry Workshop for Susan L. Hill, 3132 Eton Avenue (near Garden), Berkeley, (1924)
- LeRoy Stephens ranch house, 13581 Robleda Road, Los Altos Hills, (1925)
- Dr. Clarence Wills hunting lodge (now Rancho Diablo), Upper Valley Happy Road, Lafayette, (early 1930s)
- Mrs. J.H. Barker House, 3872 Cerrito Street, Oakland, (1931)
- Bioletti Studios, 2661-63 LeConte Avenue, Berkeley, (1939)

There are more houses, additions, workshops and other accessory buildings shown on architectural drawings and photographs in the Lilian Bridgman papers of the Bancroft Library which could not be located, dated or determined whether they were actually built.

Some of her writings are:

- Various pieces of prose in the Overland Monthly, August 1892, pp. 206–213; September 1894, pp. 311–14; January 1895, pp. 77–88; March 1895, pp. 301–09; April 1896, pp. 402–11; February 1898, pp. 137–141.
- "Lost Prairie." Harper's Magazine, ca. 1910.
- "Spirit and Flesh." Century Magazine, ca. 1899.
- "To A Wayfarer." Harper's Magazine, February 1906.
