= North Fork, California =

Unincorporated community in California, United States

North Fork, California wa?ahhpY'
- Census-designated place
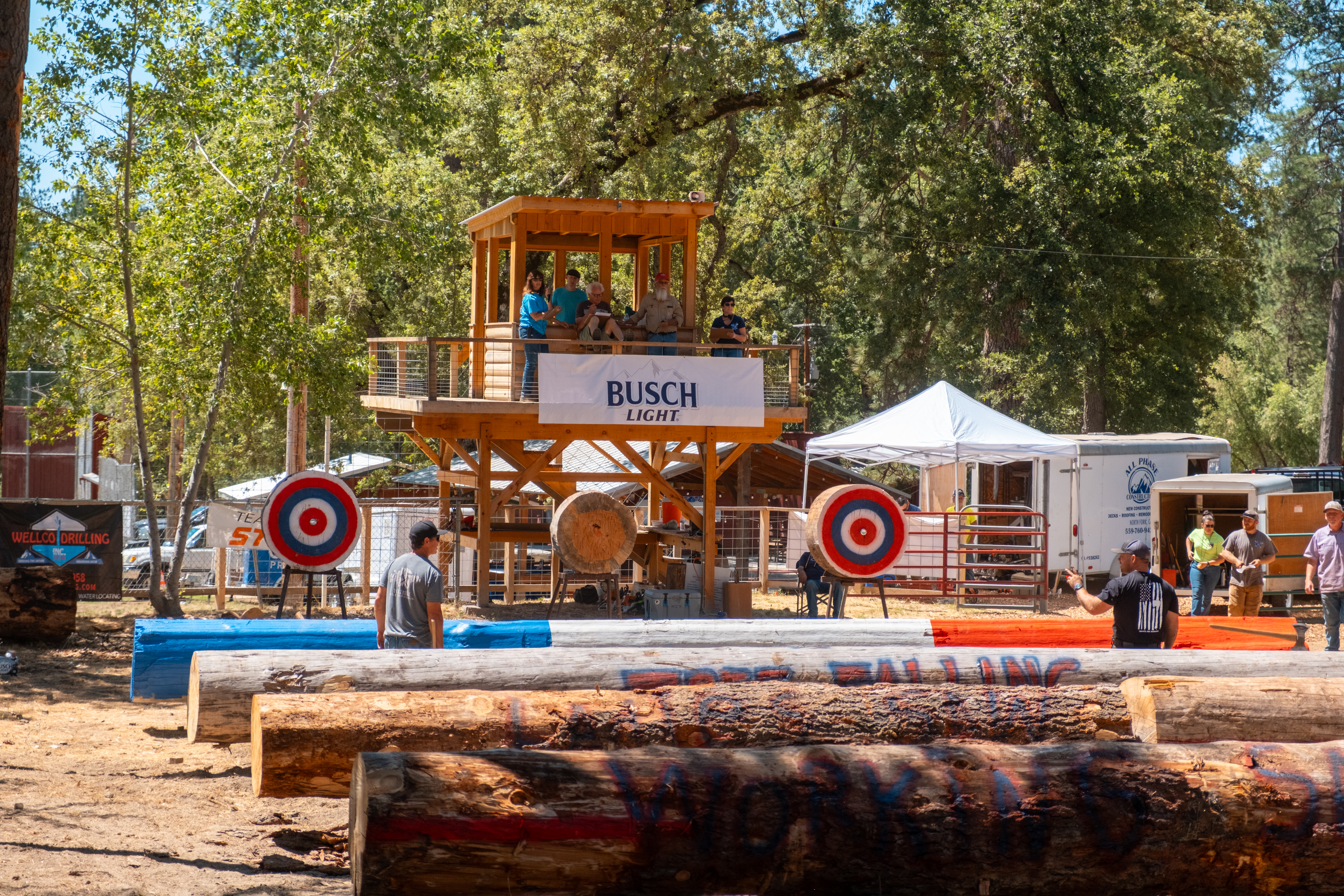
- North Fork Recreation Center, site of the annual Mid-Sierra Loggers Jamboree

- Location within California Location within the United States
- Coordinates: 37°13′47″N 119°30′34″W
- Country: United States
- State: California
- County: Madera

Area
  - Total: 32.28 sq mi (83.6 km^{2})
  - Land: 32.24 sq mi (83.5 km^{2})
  - Water: 0.04 sq mi (0.10 km^{2})
- Elevation: 2,638 ft (804 m)

Population (2020)
  - Total: 3,250
  - Density: 101/sq mi (38.9/km^{2})
- Time zone: UTC−08:00 (Pacific Time)
  - Summer (DST): UTC−07:00 (PDT)
- ZIP Code: 93643
- Area code: 559
- GNIS feature IDs: 1659768; 2804436
- FIPS code: 06-51868

North Fork (formerly Brown's and Northfork; Mono wa?ahhpY', "cedar grove") is an unincorporated community and census-designated place (CDP) in Madera County, California, United States. Located in the foothills of the Sierra Nevada, it had a population of 3,250 at the 2020 United States census. North Fork lies within the traditional homeland of the North Fork Mono and is the headquarters of the Northfork Rancheria of Mono Indians of California.

Euro-American settlement developed in the 1860s around a stopping place known as Brown's Place. The settlement became known as North Fork following the establishment of the North Fork Lumber Company and the opening of the North Fork post office in the late 1880s. In 1902, North Fork became the administrative headquarters of the Sierra Forest Reserve, predecessor of the Sierra National Forest. Logging and lumber manufacturing became central to the local economy during the 20th century; North Fork's last lumber mill closed in 1994.

The community lies near the geographic center of California. Its logging heritage is reflected in the annual Mid-Sierra Loggers Jamboree, which began as a community fundraiser in 1959.

== Geography ==
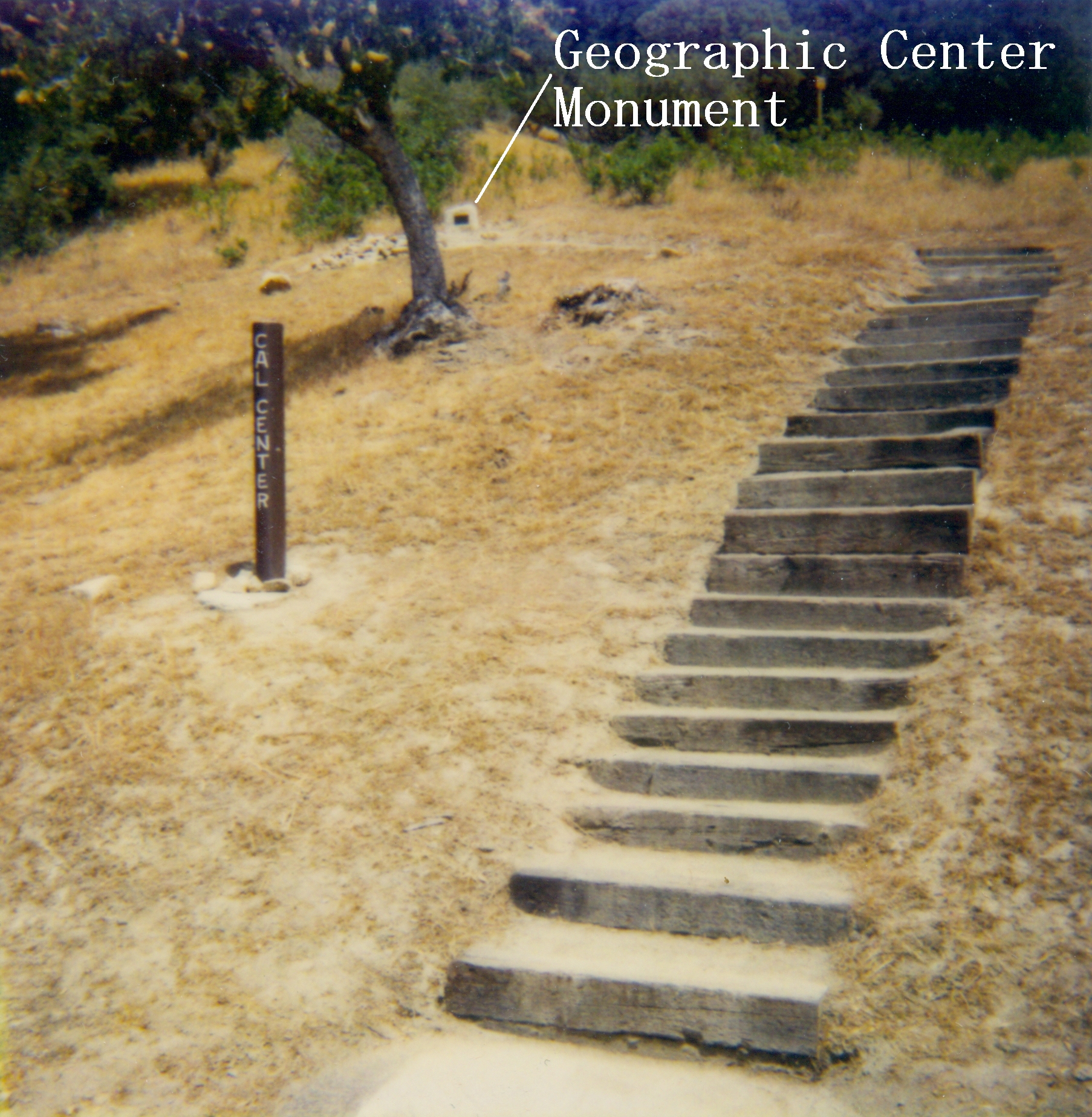
Geographic center of California near North Fork

North Fork is located in the foothills of the Sierra Nevada at an elevation of 2,638 feet (804 m). It is 46 miles (74 km) north-northeast of Fresno, 41 miles (66 km) northeast of Madera, and 17 miles (27 km) by road southeast of Oakhurst. According to the United States Census Bureau, the North Fork census-designated place has a total area of 32.3 square miles (84 km^{2}), of which 0.04 square miles (0.10 km^{2}), or 0.14%, is water.

The community is drained by Willow Creek and its North Fork and South Fork. Willow Creek flows south into the San Joaquin River.

The geographic center of California is located southeast of North Fork, between the community and Italian Bar. The location is marked by a survey monument.

=== Climate ===
North Fork has a hot-summer Mediterranean climate (Köppen Csa), with cool, wet winters and hot, dry summers. Average annual precipitation is 33.43 in (849 mm).

North Fork (1981–2010 normals)

Climate chart (precipitation, max. and min. temperature)
J	F	M	A	M	J	J	A	S	O	N	D
6.8 57 30	6.1 59 30	5.4 63 35	2.4 69 38	1.5 78 45	0.4 87 52	0.1 95 58	0.1 95 57	0.5 89 52	1.8 78 43	3.6 65 36	4.9 57 31
- █ Average max. and min. temperatures in °F
- █ Precipitation totals in inches
- Source: Western Regional Climate Center
Metric conversion
J	F	M	A	M	J	J	A	S	O	N	D
171 14 −1	155 15 −1	137 17 2	60 20 4	37 25 7	11 31 11	3 35 14	1.5 35 14	12 32 11	47 25 6	90 18 2	124 14 0
- █ Average max. and min. temperatures in °C
- █ Precipitation totals in mm

== Demographics ==
North Fork first appeared as a census-designated place in the 2020 United States census.

=== 2020 census ===
As of the 2020 census, North Fork had a population of 3,250. The median age was 51.0 years; 20.2% of residents were under the age of 18 and 30.1% were 65 years of age or older.

There were 1,327 households and 1,633 housing units.

North Fork CDP, California – Racial and ethnic composition
Race / ethnicity	Population 2020	Percent
White alone, non-Hispanic	2,264	69.66%
Black or African American alone, non-Hispanic	12	0.37%
Native American or Alaska Native alone, non-Hispanic	301	9.26%
Asian alone, non-Hispanic	29	0.89%
Pacific Islander alone, non-Hispanic	6	0.18%
Other race alone, non-Hispanic	14	0.43%
Two or more races, non-Hispanic	239	7.35%
Hispanic or Latino, any race	385	11.85%
Total	3,250	100.00%

=== Demographic estimates ===
According to the American Community Survey, the median household income was $65,850 and 15.7% of residents lived below the poverty line. About 17.9% of adults held a bachelor's degree or higher.

== History ==
=== North Fork Mono ===
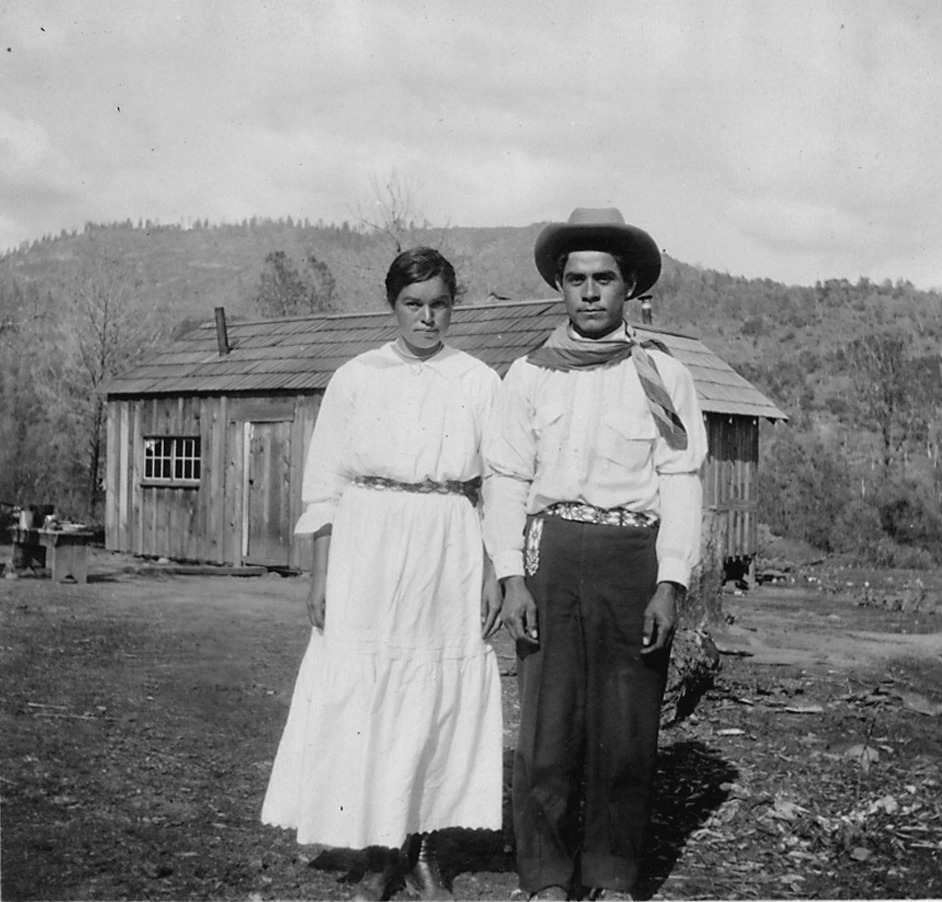
Mono couple living near Northfork, California, ca. 1920

North Fork lies within the traditional homeland of the North Fork Mono, a Western Mono community whose traditional territory extended across the western slopes of the central Sierra Nevada and adjoining areas of the San Joaquin Valley. By the early 20th century, the acquisition of land by non-Native settlers had resulted in many North Fork Mono families concentrating around the community of North Fork.

Federal land policy also altered the Mono people's use of the surrounding mountains. The creation of the Sierra Forest Reserve in 1893 brought much of the region under federal management. By the late 1890s, regulations governing grazing were being enforced against Mono livestock owners, restricting habitation and access to lands traditionally used for subsistence and grazing.

A Presbyterian mission was established at North Fork in 1903. In 1916, the federal government purchased 80 acres near the mission for approximately 200 landless Indians of the North Fork band, creating the North Fork Rancheria. The federal government terminated the tribe's recognized status in 1961 under the California Rancheria termination program. Its federal status was restored in 1983 through the Tillie Hardwick v. United States settlement, and the Rancheria boundaries were restored in 1987.

=== Early history ===
Euro-American settlement in the North Fork area began in the mid-19th century. In 1865, Milton Brown built a log cabin at the end of a wagon road extending from Crane Valley toward the north fork of the San Joaquin River. The location became known as "Brown's Place" and served stockmen, sheepmen, and miners who left their wagons and supplies there before continuing into the mountains.

In 1886, Brown and John Bartram established a sawmill on Peckinpah Mountain and organized the North Fork Lumber Company. The North Fork post office was established in 1888, and the company's name was subsequently adopted by the settlement.

The Peckinpah family was among the area's early settlers. The family established a ranch near North Fork in 1884 and operated a sawmill in the surrounding mountains; Peckinpah Mountain took its name from the family and their lumbering activities. Film director Sam Peckinpah, a grandson of the family, spent part of his youth on the North Fork ranch.

The early settlement consisted of a small number of stores and hotels. Nearby Alder Creek became known as Whiskey Creek, a name attributed to the amount of whiskey sold at the local general store. The Fresno Morning Republican later described North Fork as "a bleak little mountain center," reflecting its isolation from San Joaquin Valley communities.

=== Forestry ===
In 1902, North Fork was selected as the headquarters of the Sierra Reserves, the predecessor to the Sierra National Forest, when Charles H. Shinn was appointed head ranger. The town's location, between the northern boundary at Tuolumne County and the southern boundary at Kern County, provided a central base for administration. The supervisor's office remained in North Fork until 1989, when it was relocated to Clovis.

=== Lumber industry ===
A Sugar Pine Lumber Company "man train" crossing Timber Creek near Camp 2, 1925

Logging in eastern Madera County declined sharply during the Great Depression, and the Sugar Pine Lumber Company, operating in the mountains above North Fork, shut down in 1933.

In 1941, the Associated Box and Lumber Company purchased 135 acres (55 ha) of land and moved its operations from Bieber to North Fork the following year. The mill began operating in 1942 and processed its first log on April 1, 1943. In its first year it produced about nine million board feet of lumber, primarily from ponderosa pine, sugar pine, lodgepole pine, and incense cedar.

By 1951, North Fork's population exceeded 2,000, and the mill employed more than 130 workers. The facility included a sawmill, planing mill, storage areas, workshops, and company housing for employees.

In 1985, Ron Yanke acquired the operation, renaming it South Fork Timber Industries. From 1985 to 1991 the mill averaged 143 million board feet of lumber annually. A cogeneration plant was added in 1986 to generate electricity from sawdust, with surplus power sold to utilities.

Reduced forest yields in the early 1990s, combined with higher costs, led to layoffs beginning in 1991. The mill closed on February 25, 1994.

== Economy ==
North Fork's economy was historically dominated by logging and lumber manufacturing. The community's last major sawmill, South Fork Timber Industries, closed in 1994, ending one of the town's principal sources of employment. The closure had a substantial effect on the local economy; by 2001, High Country News reported that North Fork had lost a number of businesses and services and that many residents were commuting to Fresno or Madera for work.

The North Fork Community Development Council was established in 1994 and later undertook redevelopment of the former 135-acre mill site for new economic and community uses.

The United States Forest Service remains a local employer and maintains operations in North Fork, including the Crane Valley Hotshots.

== Culture and landmarks ==
The Sierra Mono Museum preserves and interprets the history and culture of the Mono people. North Fork is also the western starting point of the Sierra Vista Scenic Byway, a 100-mile (160 km) route through the Sierra National Forest. The geographic center of California, as determined by a 1995 survey, is located about 7 miles (11 km) from the community.

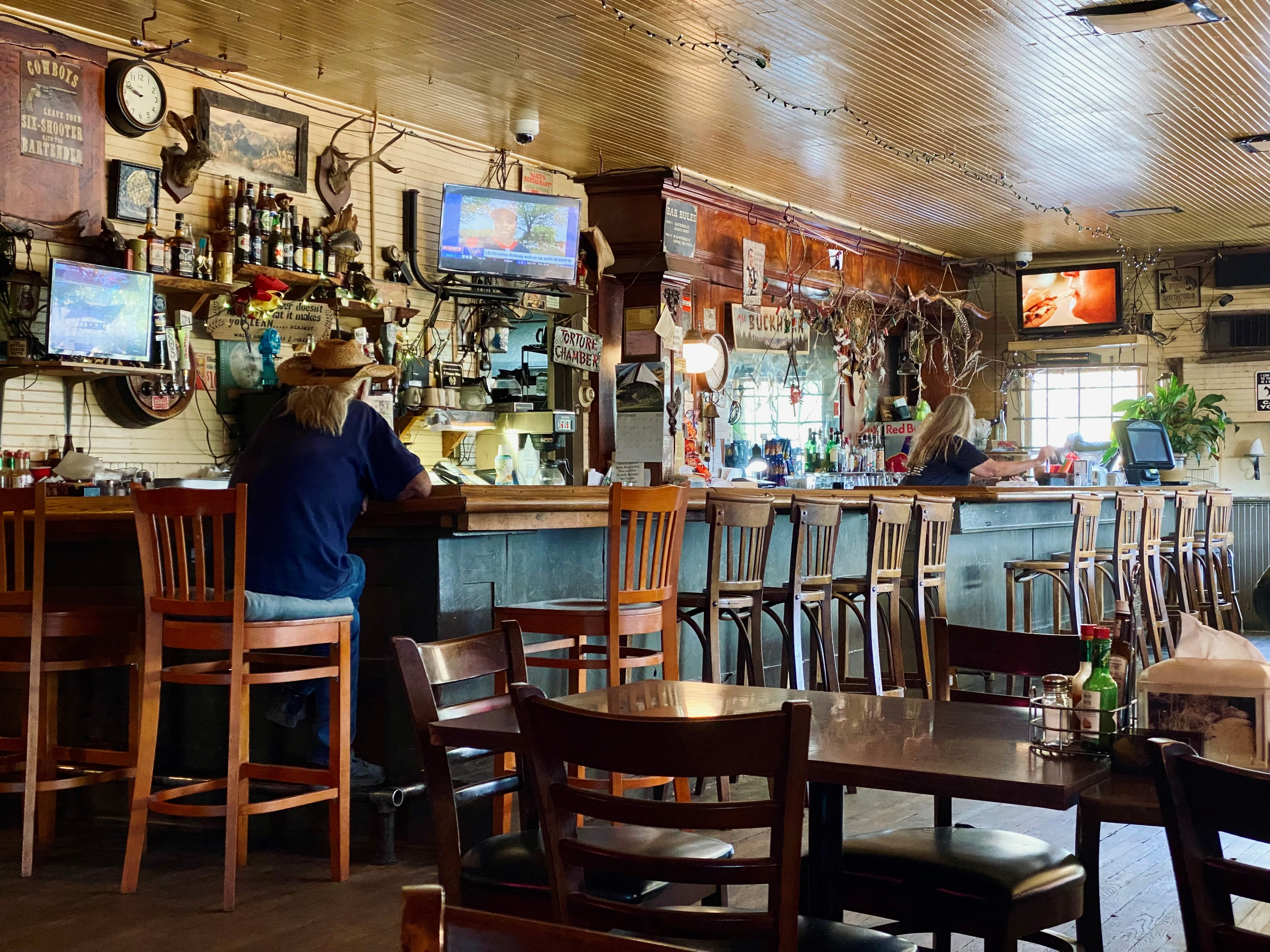
The Buckhorn Saloon

The Buckhorn Saloon has operated in North Fork since the late 19th century. By the 1950s, it also functioned as a dude ranch, serving fishing and hunting parties as well as workers from the local logging industry.

The North Fork Loggers Jamboree began in 1959 as an annual competition for loggers from seven surrounding counties. Events included logging competitions, a parade, and a pageant. After the closure of the North Fork sawmill in 1994, the event became known as the Mid-Sierra Loggers Jamboree and continued as a celebration of the area's logging heritage.

== Notable people ==
- Ulysses Goode, Western Mono Basketmaker and 1999 NEA National Heritage Fellow.
- Nate Hodges, Stihl Timbersports Series champion
- Edmund Kemper, then 15 years old, shot his grandparents to death at a ranch in 1964
- Jeff King, four-time champion of the Iditarod Trail Sled Dog Race
- Sam Peckinpah, director, spent much of his youth on his grandparents' ranch in North Fork
- Charles Howard Shinn, a pioneering horticulturalist and forest ranger, after whom Mt. Shinn was named.

== See also ==
- Mission Fire
