= Milicent Shinn =

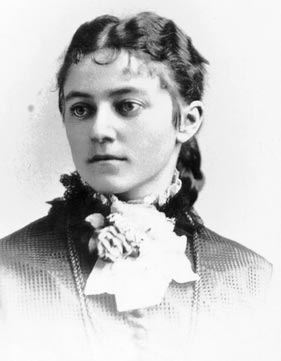
- Shinn in 1898
- Born: Milicent Washburn Shinn; April 15, 1858; Near Centerville, Alameda County, California, US
- Died: August 13, 1940 (aged 82); Niles, California, US
- Resting place: Mountain View Cemetery, Oakland, California
- Education: University of California, Berkeley
- Scientific career
- Fields: Psychology

Milicent Washburn Shinn (April 15, 1858 – August 13, 1940) was an American writer, journalist and developmental psychologist. She was the first woman to receive a doctorate from the University of California, Berkeley. She was the first in the U.S. to comprehensively detail the process of a child’s intellectual and physical maturation.

She entered the State University in 1874 and finished her undergraduate degree in 1880. She was one of three student speakers at the commencement. After graduation, she worked at the Overland Monthly from 1882 to 1894. Her mobilization of a network of educated women to observe children made it possible to compare children and establish average estimates of development over time. Although she advocated for more research to be conducted before her findings could be applied in educational programs, Shinn’s research furthered the field of psychology's overall understanding of development and paved the way for pedagogical advances. She received her Ph.D. in Education in 1898 at the age of 40.

== Early life ==
Shinn was born on her parents' ranch in Southern Alameda County on April 15, 1858. She was the daughter of James Shinn and Lucy Ellen Clark. The ranch was located between Centerville and the Vallejo Flour Mill along the southern bank of Alameda Creek. The Transcontinental Railroad came through Alameda Cañon in 1869. Niles station was established in 1870 and eventually the area became the town of Niles, California (now a district of Fremont, California). Shinn's father was a nurseryman and fruit rancher. He was involved in state horticultural, nurseryman, and agricultural organizations. Shinn was one of seven children, however, three of her siblings died at a young age and her sister Annie died as a young adult in 1878. Shinn's parents sent children Annie, Milicent, Joseph, and Charles Howard Shinn to the University of California, Berkeley. UC Berkeley started admitting women in 1873. Shinn began in 1874.

Before Shinn began her studies at UC Berkeley, she was enrolled in Oakland High School. There, she met Edward Rowland Sill, a respected poet and acting principal at the time, who inspired her and advised her to pursue a college education. Although they encouraged her to attend UC Berkeley, Shinn’s family was not wealthy. Accordingly, Shinn wrote for newspapers to earn money for tuition and, in 1877, took two years away from school to generate income as a public-school teacher. Upon graduation, Shinn gained employment as the editor of the San Francisco Commercial Herald; however, at Sill’s behest, she soon became the editor of the resurrected Overland Monthly, the failed literary magazine. Shinn agreed to embark on this risky editorial venture in part because of Sill’s recommendation and because she believed that she could use the Overland Monthly to persuade young male writers to take an interest in California and establish improved moral and intellectual standards within the state.

Milicent Shinn's older brother, Charles Howard Shinn, was a writer, teacher, inspector of the UC experiment stations, horticulturalist, and forest ranger. Shinn's cousin Edmund Clark Sanford was a prominent psychologist. Joseph Clark Shinn, the youngest brother, lived on the Shinn Ranch for his whole life and took over for his father, James. Milicent Shinn studied Charles' daughter Ruth, starting in 1890, the main focus of Shinn's early research. Shinn also studied her brother's other three children from 1906 on.

Additionally, Shinn was known to frequently correspond with her extended family.

== Career ==
Shinn was active as a writer, editor, scientist and research worker. Following her undergraduate studies, Shinn began her work as the editor for the Overland Monthly.

Shinn believed in the power of the press and thought that contributing to the literature of California would help aid in reducing the social woes that had arisen following the end of the American Civil War.

Shinn is well known in the Psychology community for her University of California Press papers "Notes on the Development of a Child I (1893), II (1907), III & IV (1899). Additionally, Shinn's personal observational work prior to her doctorate program, "The First Two Years of the Child" was considered the first of its kind in the United States. Her research focused specifically on observations of the emotional and physical health of her niece and her progression over the first two years of her life. This was the first extensive documentation of a child's upbringing and was thought to be incredibly valuable to the field of child psychology. As a result, Shinn was invited to present her findings at the World’s Columbian Exposition, a fair in which a series of conferences were delivered to explain many of the academic advances of the time. Shinn’s observations of Ruth’s development were revolutionary, as few academics had offered notes as comprehensive and insightful as hers at the time. The value of her work was recognized by many, and she was consequently invited to attend various graduate institutions so that she could continue her studies on child development. Fiercely loyal to California, her family, and those who supported her throughout her endeavors, Shinn elected to again attend UC Berkeley so that her home state would benefit from any notoriety her studies garnered. Prepared to fully pursue a doctoral degree, Shinn resigned from the Overland Monthly in 1894 and became the first woman to receive a Ph.D. from UC Berkeley.

Shinn’s presentation on Ruth’s development was not, however, the sole impetus for her graduate studies. While working as an editor, Shinn was intimately involved with the Association of Collegiate Alumnae (ACA). In fact, she hosted the first informal meeting for the Pacific Association of Collegiate Alumnæ in 1885 in her Overland Monthly offices. Her work in the ACA primarily consisted of advocacy for female UC Berkeley students and the promotion of child study among college women. Around 1891, Shinn founded the California Child Study Section within the ACA with the goal of establishing a network of women who would observe the growth and development of children and compare their findings to existing research. Her work with the ACA led her to collaborate with Professor Bernard Moses, with whom she constructed and organized graduate courses on pedagogy in the context of child development. These courses later became known as Berkeley’s Graduate Seminary in Pedagogy, and in 1893, Shinn managed to obtain admission into the program for the ACA California Child Study Section, which permitted members the opportunity to earn graduate degrees for their research. Thus, when Shinn pursued her own graduate studies in 1894, it was with the intention of furthering her research on child development, motivated by her interest in the field and its broader applications, her involvement in the ACA, and her work with Ruth.

Shinn was also a member of the Society of Mayflower Descendants, the American Academy of Science, the Phi Beta Kappa, the American Eugenics Society, the Alumni Association of the University of California, the Prytanean Society, the Save the Redwoods League, the League of Nations Association. She was on the advisory council of the Women's Congress Association of the Pacific Coast in 1895. She spoke about "Early Home Environment" at the conference: "To live in the country, to see birds flying and flowers growing and trees waving in the wind and great skies spreading above, to dig in the ground, to know some thing of the way God works his wonders in plant life; this seems to me the only real living for a little child." She is listed in American men of science: a biographical directory. The New York Times reviewed her publications in 1908: "Miss Milicent Washburn Shinn has compiled in two volumes a series of Notes of the Development of a Child, the second volume of which, The Development of the Senses in the First Three Years of Childhood, has recently been published by the press of the University of California."

== The Overland Monthly ==
The Overland Monthly, the newspaper which Shinn helped resurrect at the age of 24, was based in California and produced its first series of works in the year 1868. The newspaper, which maintained the same ownership throughout its existence, changed titles over the years 1868 to 1935.

Milicent was, for a time in 1882 assistant to Warren Cheney, editor of The Californian. The September issue noted that the later issues would be titled "The Californian & the Overland" The November 1882 issue was titled the Californian and Overland Monthly. The December issue had announcements for 1883

A dinner on December 22, 1882, relaunched the Overland Monthly under Shinn's editorship. It was held at Irving M. Scott's house in San Francisco. Guests included Milicent Shinn, Prof. Kellog, W. W. Crane, Drs. Joseph and John LeConte, John H. Carmany, Charles S. Greene, Ina Coolbrith, Prof. E. R. Sill, Prof. Bernard Moses, and others. The supplement to the first volume of the second series describes the dinner and includes speeches and letters. The first issue of the second series has an overview of the years under Bret Harte, "Overland Reminiscences" of the year before the revival of the journal.

In the June 1883 issue, her essay "Thirty Miles" depicted what she saw on her journey from Niles to the San Francisco office by train and ferry.

In an 1891 article titled the "Warmed Overland Monthly" Ambrose Bierce, known for his biting journalism, wrote about the rumors that the Overland Monthly would be soon passed into new hands. He wrote "Miss Shinn herself writes well, if conventionally, but as an editor she has been handicapped by patrons who besides furnishing money have insisted on seeing themselves in print."

In the April 1894, Milicent resigned from the editorship and introduced her replacement Rounsevelle Wildman. In an article in the Overland Monthly, July 1898, Shinn reflected on her years as editor, 1883–1894. She talked about how the world's attention at the time was fixated on the Gold Rush that took place in California. Shinn corresponded with many famous people, like John Muir, while editor.

== Personal life ==
Shinn was a lifelong resident of California. Her life followed the path of academia, but family matters, described as the "family claim", limited the amount of time she could invest in her professional aspirations and prompted Shinn to return home to act as a caretaker for her aging parents after receiving her Ph.D. Her father, James, died before Milicent received her PhD. Lucy Shinn died in 1915. Shinn capitalized on her surroundings, making Ruth and her other nieces and nephews the center of her work. There is no record of Shinn having any intimate relationships or any children of her own.

Some research suggests that Shinn viewed her devotion to her family and her home state not as a limiting force on her professional aspirations, but as a strength. Many of the female observers in Shinn’s ACA network encountered significant difficulty in their attempts at balancing their observations with their other household duties, and few of them had family members willing to assist them in their observations. Shinn, however, had the unique privilege of support within her family system, such that she could observe Ruth without trouble, or she could rely on her mother or sister-in-law to provide her with data. Shinn initiated research that would eventually change the way that children are understood and taught, thereby contributing to the betterment of California, without sacrificing her roles as a daughter, sister, and aunt. She used her platform, both as an editor and as a researcher, to draw attention to causes that mattered to her, and these causes were grounded in values pertaining to family, education, and homeland loyalty.

Lilian Bridgman designed Shinn's home that was located on her family's property in Niles in 1916 and finished in 1917. The home was moved to Peralta Road around 1958, because of gravel quarrying operations along Alameda Creek and possibly because of flooding and still exists today as a private home.

She lived at her home for a quarter of a century in Niles, California, where she died at the age of 82 in 1940. The New York Times published her obituary on August 15, 1940, two days after she died.

== Family Claim Controversy ==
Women such as Millicent in the 1900s often experienced what scholars currently refer to as the family claim and sisterhood. These two concepts describe the household values held by the majority of families in North America during this time period. Females of all ages were understood to have an obligation to the family. This created a toxic environment that severely limited the social mobility of the individuals and limited the options for personal growth and expression. Scarborough and Furumoto used Shinn as an example of “the family claim”—the career limitations women faced in terms of their family obligations.

Despite the perceived notion that Shinn would be restrained by the family claim and her duty to her family, she was able to continue her work in the field of child psychology. Shinn did not let societal restrictions hold her back and pursued her efforts to collect data from her network of home-observers. Her network consisted of college-educated mothers who helped serve as observers of their own children which provided Shinn with much meaningful data. This unique approach to in-home data collection led Shinn to produce in 1907 her powerful piece titled The Development of the Senses in the First Three Years of Childhood.

Shinn’s notebooks and letters also indicate that she continued to observe her young family members well after she obtained her PhD and attempted to publish her findings in 1932, at the age of 72. She maintained contact with several colleagues and continued to offer her scholarly advice and encouragement to those who sought it. Additionally, Shinn’s professional aspirations were not limited to the field of psychology. Her decision to become editor of the Overland Monthly, her involvement in the creation of Berkeley’s Graduate Seminary in Pedagogy, and her self-proclaimed occupation of student speak to her love of education. When she elected to complete her graduate studies and return to her family homestead, she did not do so with the intention of releasing all her professional goals. Instead, she became a tutor for her nieces and nephews and engaged in a symbiotic learning relationship with them, thereby furthering her own research and satisfying a desire to contribute to an educated California. Shinn was not forced to choose between what she wanted for herself and the expectations of her family- she navigated both with the poise and professionalism of a 19th-century woman.

== Influence on Developmental Psychology ==
While German philosopher Dietrich Tiedemann is credited with writing the first baby biography in 1787, followed by a German biologist Wilhelm Preyer in 1882, Shinn published one of the most well-known baby biographies in the United States in 1900, based largely on her observations of her niece, Ruth. Initially using Preyer’s The Mind of the Child as a framework, Shinn methodically documented Ruth’s growth and development, particularly her senses, reflexes, and movements; however, as she continued in her observations, they began to deviate from Preyer’s. Shinn had what she described as "the notebook habit from college and editorial days, and jotted things down as I watched, till quite unexpectedly I found myself in possession of a large mass of data." Her observations were delivered as a paper titled, "The First Two Years of the Child" which were presented at the World's Columbian Exposition in Chicago in 1893 where it was recognized as the first of its kind in the United States.

Shinn was a leading pioneer of research on child development. She systematically conducted her observations and divided them into five categories: physical senses, emotions, movements, memory and curiosity, and speech and understanding. Shinn was concerned with both internal and external processes and how the development of those processes influenced learning. Shinn argued that infants attend to higher-order sensory processes, such as sight, more readily than to lower-order processes, like smell and taste. Additionally, she asserted that intellectual sensations eclipse these higher-order processes over time and eventually direct them. These conclusions challenged dominant assumptions at the time and called attention to the need for additional research.

Shinn's focus on ontogenetic evolution was relatively new for her time and paved the way for more studies on infants since children were studied far more than infants in the 19th century. Shinn noted that, "Thus it has come to pass that while babies are born and grow up in every household, and while the gradual unfolding of their faculties has been watched with the keenest interest and intensest joy by intelligent and even scientific fathers and mother from time immemorial, yet very little has yet been done in the scientific study of this most important of all possible subjects-the ontogenetic evolution of the faculties of the human mind." It follows that Shinn enabled infant development to have since been studied in numerous unique contexts: medical correlates of infant development (Littman & Parmelee, 1978), the impact of postnatal depression on infant development (Murray, 1992), the development of infant-father relationships (Lamb, 1997), infant development of wariness of strangers (Sroufe, 1977), and in-depth books on general infant development like Joy Osofsky's (1987) handbook of infant development to name a few. Shinn's work also laid the foundation for Jean Piaget's child development research.

Shinn noted how practical intelligence appears around the middle of the first year of an infant's life, giving the example of how her niece first used her intelligence to place her toe into her mouth in a different motion than the one she used to put her rattle in her mouth. Thus, Shinn acted as a pioneer for other researchers like Bar-On and Parker (2000) and Sternberg and Grigorenko (2000) to study the development of practical intelligence. Causality research via experiments with infants such as Newman et al.'s (2008) study on the origins of causal perception and Yale University's habituation studies have also stemmed from Shinn's research.

Infant imitation was recognized by Shinn, laying the foundation for later studies such as Ryalls et al.'s (2020) research in which 14–18-month-old infants watched a peer or adult model complete a 3-step sequence and then demonstrated significant ability to imitate what they saw immediately and one week later, more successfully for the peer than adult condition.

Shinn also exemplified the beginnings of intercommunication by speech in Ruth when she stood behind Ruth and neutrally listed off different names until saying “Ruth” and noticing how she turned and looked at Shinn only when her name was spoken. Mandel et al. (1995) was able to expand on Shinn's name recognition observations by using a head-turn preference procedure. This procedure indicated that 4–5-month-old infants recognize the patterns of their names and can distinguish them from noises with both different and the same stress patterns.

Emotional dependence was another topic discussed by Shinn. She observed that Ruth grew anxious upon separation from her mother and would cry while being carried around corridors, stopping to see if her mother was around the corner, and continuing crying once she saw that she was not. Noting emotional dependence paved the way for studies about attachment types, for example, by Mikulincer and Nachshon (1991), and even the study of the neurobiology of infant attachment as discussed by Moriceau and Sullivan (2005).

== Advocacy ==
In her career as editor of the Overland Monthly, Shinn used the magazine as a platform for intellectual engagement and advocacy. In actively conversing and visiting with scholars whom she wanted to publish, Shinn gained extensive experience in academic circles and established a vibrant social network. When she became involved in the ACA, Shinn drew on this existing network to develop a system of child-study observers that would not only provide socially acceptable research opportunities for college-educated women but also significantly contribute to the understanding of child development. Although Shinn started with the California Child Study Section, she would ultimately mobilize a nationwide network of 35 women within the ACA that systematically observed children under the age of 5 for physical, emotional, perceptual, and verbal changes over time. To ensure that the observers collected data empirically and methodically, Shinn created syllabi for them that were based on the model of observation introduced by Stanley Hall. She also analyzed the observations herself and suggested that they be published through the ACA after she reviewed them. Although she and her observers confronted obstacles such as disruption to focused observation and prejudiced views toward women, Shinn’s efforts resulted in groundbreaking findings regarding child development and promoted changes in how women’s contributions were viewed.

Shinn also published at least one article that demonstrated her support of college-educated women: “The Marriage Rate of College Women”. In it, Shinn argued that lower rates of marriage among college-educated women were not the result of undesirable characteristics of the women themselves. She contended that these lower rates were instead likely the result of the profession that many college-educated women found themselves in: teachers at all-girl institutions. Environments as such hardly present ample opportunities for meeting men of marrying age. Shinn also offered the explanation that college-educated women have higher expectations of their partners and possess the capacity to be selective in their choices due to their financial autonomy. As a final possibility, Shinn suggested that many men simply do not like educated women. Though she did not provide her beliefs regarding the reason for this, she did offer an anecdote in which an educated man cited his reason for marrying an uneducated woman as the adoration she showed him for his knowledge. In the anecdote, an educated woman responded that she would very much like to find a man worth adoring, but that he must earn it by truly being superior rather than by hampering a woman’s ability to match him. In making these arguments, Shinn challenged the dominant notions of her time and strategically positioned the burden of blame so that it did not solely belong to women. The article speaks to Shinn’s ability to diplomatically question the cultural norms of her time within the parameters of socially accepted behavior.

== Impact and Legacy ==
Shinn's story promotes the present understanding of the history of psychology by highlighting the significance of marginalized voices, the role that women played in the advancement of the field, and the capacity for meaningful contribution despite substantial impediments. As a woman in a field largely dominated by men at the time, Shinn demonstrated that it was possible for individuals of marginalized groups to make a significant impact in professional fields while also tending to responsibilities at home. Because research on child development had only recently garnered attention in the U.S. at the time of Ruth’s birth, few studies existed that described the growth of an infant over time. Accordingly, Shinn’s observations were instrumental to the early understanding of developmental psychology. Her work played a critical role in later advancements in the field and continues to be expanded upon today.

== Works ==
Milicent Shinn as editor of the Overland Monthly wrote using pseudonyms while writing for the Overland Monthly. She identified the names that she used as M.W.S., John Henry Barnabas, J. Burns, R. Moore, H. Shewin, Pauline Carsten Curtis.

- Eastern and California Wildflowers Compared (December 1879) The California horticulturist and floral magazine; while visiting family in the East
- Clivia miniata (December 1879)The California horticulturist and floral magazine
- In a New England Graveyard (1880) The Californian
- The Teachers at Farwell (May 1881) The Californian
- Out of Reach: A Camping Medley I, II (May 1882) The Californian author is H.U.C (Hard Up Club). The stories were based on a camping trip in 1881 from Niles to the coast.
- Out of Reach: A Camping Medley III (June 1882) The Californian author is H.U.C.
- Out of Reach: A Camping Medley IV (July 1882) The Californian author is H.U.C.
- Modern Ethics and Egotism The (October 1882) The Californian
- Translations In Der Fremde (December 1882)
- Verses in College Verses (1882) published by the Berkeleyan Stock Company, along with verses written by her sister, Annie Shinn, her brother, Charles Howard Shinn, and her cousin, Edmund Clark Sanford
- The University of California (1883)
- End of an Era (1883)
- Summer Cañons (1883)
- "Thirty miles". The Overland Monthly, I, 596-604 (1883). She wrote of the creeks, weather, towns, plants, wildlife, ships, ferries, the bay, and school children. She attended Oakland High School and this was the same railroad line that she took to the Overland Monthly offices in San Francisco.
- "Young Strong of 'The Clarion'"; The Overland Monthly (Sept 1884); Stories by American Authors, Volume 9
- "The Verse and Prose of H.H.", Overland Monthly (Sept. 1885) following the death of Helen Hunt Jackson. Other articles and poems about H.H.
- "A Pioneer Fruit Region", Overland Monthly (July 1888)(under pen name J. Burns)
- "Poverty and Charity in San Francisco," Overland Monthly (1889, p. 535-547)
- The Leland Stanford, Junior, University (1891)
- The Lick Astronomical Department of the University of California (1892)
- "The University of California. The Lick Astronomical Department" appears in chapter X of the Magnetic astronomy of the Bible. Seven seals opened. The glory of God revealed in the sun, moon, planets and stars, by new application of magnetic force and power (1893)
- Notes on the development of a child (1893)
- Notes on the development of a child, 2 volumes, University of California Studies, (1893).
- Young Strong of the "Clarion" in Stories by American authors
- "Some Comments on Babies", Overland monthly and the Out West magazine (1894)
- The Baby's Mind — A Study for College Women, 1894
- The first two years of the child. In Proceedings of the International Congress of Education, Chicago, 1893. New York: National Education Association (1895).
- "The marriage rate of college women", The Century, 1895, p.946-48.
- Notes on Children's Drawings (1897)
- Sheets from 'The Overland monthly, for October, November and December, 1882. "The University of California"; "The University of California. II. The Lick Astronomical Department"
- The Biography Of A Baby (1900)
- Syllabi A to E
- Syllabi F to H for mothers, F to H for teachersj
- Shinn, M. (November 1906). "Child Discipline; Wherein Perplexed Parent and Teachers Tell Their Stories and Hear Wise Council from Milicent Washburn Shinn". Good Housekeeping: A Family Journal. Vol. 43, no. 5. Illustrated by Katharine R. Wireman. pp. 467–474. Archived from the original on 2021-09-05 – via Cornell University Library Digital Collections.
- Notes on the development of a child. II. The development of the senses in the first three years of childhood (1907)
- The Development of the Senses in the First Three Years of Childhood, (1908)
- Women Wants Ballot Men Won by War, Appeal to Farmers of State Asks Votes for All Alike, San Francisco Call (11 September 1911)
- Entry for Joseph Washburn Clark in Gay, Julius (1882). A record of the descendants of John Clark, of Farmington, Conn. The male branches brought down to 1882. The female branches one generation after the Clark name is lost in marriage. p.60-65
- Young Strong of the "Clarion" in Stories by American authors, 1911
- Comments in Winning Equal Suffrage in California, 1912, p. 127-128; Condensed from leaflet to "Farmers and Fruit Growers," written for California Campaign. A copy of the leaflet described in this reference
- Biography of a Baby with intro by T. Berry Brazelton. (1985)

=== Overland Monthly Editor ===
Shinn was editor of Overland Monthly from 1883 to 1894.

=== Pacific Association of Collegiate Alumnae ===
The Pacific Association of Collegiate Alumnae was the third branch of the Association of Collegiate Alumnae. Shinn hosted the first meeting at her offices of the Overland Monthly. The organization was formed in October 1885. The University of California was accepted in 1886.

=== Correspondence ===
- Daniel Coit Gilman

=== Archive locations ===
- Bancroft Library at the University of California: Milicent Washburn Shinn papers, 1889–1935, Milicent Washburn Shinn papers, circa 1882–1906.
- Shinn House archives at Shinn Historical Park & Arboretum
- Washington Township Museum of Local History
- University of the Pacific, Letters to John Muir
- California Historical Society

=== Shinn Historical Park & Arboretum ===
The park is owned by the city of Fremont, California and is the last 4 acres of Shinn's Nurseries and the Shinn Ranch. Three groups are active in the park. The Friends of Heirloom Flowers is the garden club that, since 1994, has taken care of the gardens around the historic Shinn House built in 1876, the Shinn Bungalow built around 1907, and the Sim Cottage built before 1856. The Mission Peak Heritage Foundation (MPHF) has managed the Shinn House and Shinn House Museum since 1972. The Chinese Bunkhouse Preservation Project is a subcommittee of the MPHF and was formed to preserve the last remaining building from the Shinn Ranch China Camp.
