= Charles Howard Shinn =

American horticulturalist, author

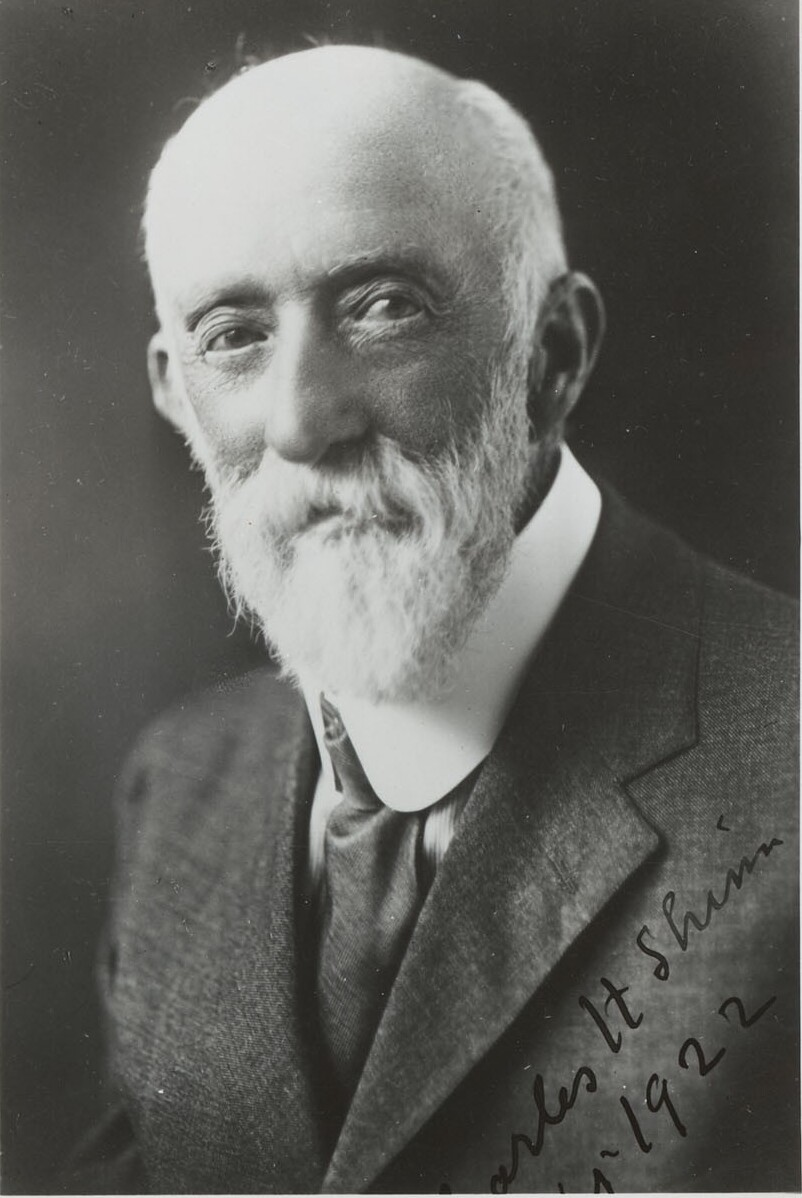
- Shinn in 1922
- Born: April 29, 1852; Round Rock, Texas, U.S.
- Died: December 2, 1924 (aged 72); Ukiah, California, U.S.

Charles Howard Shinn (April 29, 1852 – December 2, 1924) was an American horticulturalist, author and forest ranger who worked for the U.S. Forest Service. He was inspector of California Experiment Stations and head forest ranger of the Sierra Forest. Mt. Shinn in California is named after him.

== Early life and education ==
Shinn was born in Round Rock, Texas in 1852 to James and Lucy Shinn. The family moved to Southern Alameda County, California along Alameda Creek between Centerville and Vallejo's Mills in 1856. Vallejo's Mills became the town of Niles in 1869 (now a District in Fremont). Much of Charles Shinn's childhood was spent at the ranch and nursery of his family in Niles. His sister Milicent Shinn and his first cousin Edmund Clark Sanford were psychologists.

Shinn attended the state university for two years, now the University of California, Berkeley. He attended Johns Hopkins University from 1882 to 1884. He received a bachelor's degree conferred "extra ordinary." While at Johns Hopkins University, his roommate was future U.S. president Woodrow Wilson.

== Career ==
Shinn was a teacher in four counties in California from 1870 to 1876 and at Washington Corners in 1876.

He was also a writer. In 1878, while teaching in Shasta County, he began the study of the mining district codes or laws of the 49ers and after. His most famous book, Mining Camps (1885), was a result of field work there and in the Sierras. The emphasis of the German folk moot tradition espoused while he was at Johns Hopkins influenced his often romanticized writings about the early mining camps. Between 1879 and 1889 he wrote for newspapers and magazines in San Francisco, Baltimore, and New York. In 1879 he worked for the San Francisco Bulletin. From 1878 to 1880 he edited the California Horticulturalist and Floral Magazine. which was published by John H. Carmany. He published the Pacific Rural Handbook in 1879. He contributed to other journals: Pacific Rural Press, the Southern California Horticulturist, the Gardener's Monthly, Vick's Monthly, the Rural New Yorker, and The Garden of London.

The California State Horticultural Society was organized in 1879. Officers were: Professor E. W. Hilgard (President), J. Lewelling (Vice President), Edward J. Wickson (Secretary), G. P. Rixford (Treasurer). Directors were W. B. West of Stockton, Dr. John Strentzel, of Martinez, Dr. Behr of San Francisco, Charles H. Shinn of Niles, and John Rock of San Jose.

During the late 1880s, he served as managing editor of Overland Monthly while continuing to publish articles on nature, mining, and rustic California.

Shinn was inspector of California Experiment Stations from 1890 to 1902 In the May 8, Nation, 1893, Shinn wrote about the Geary Act and the affect on the Chinese workers and orchard owners in California.

In 1892 he was a Charter member of the Sierra Club. In 1900, he and his wife, Julia, were trustees of the Niles Library.

He was head forest ranger of the Sierra (North) Forest in 1902 for the Department of the Interior. In 1914 he worked for the San Joaquin Valley Counties Association. He retired from his Forest Service position in July 1924.

== Marriage ==
Shinn married Julia Charlotte Tyler on July 31, 1888, at the home of her father, Asher Tyler, in Oakland. Their daughter, Ruth Shinn, was born on October 6, 1890. Ruth's developmental stages were observed by Milicent Shinn at the Shinn Ranch. Julia shared Shinn's interests in nature, worked at his side, and became one of the first women employed by the new U.S. Forest Service.

== Death ==
Shinn spent the last 22 years of his life in North Fork, California. Julia Shinn named their home the "Peace Cabin". He retired as supervising forest ranger a year before he passed. He is buried in Ukiah, California.

== Memorial ==
Shinn is remembered in the Sierra Club bulletin and in the Journal of Forestry. Coincidentally "Ranger Shinn; The Story of a Man Who Shaped His Life to Get the Greatest Happiness" was published in Sunset Magazine in the month that he died.

Mt. Shinn in the Sierra Nevada is named after Shinn. The name became official in 1934

== Writings ==
=== Journal articles ===
Charles Howard Shinn wrote for the Overland Monthly using a pseudonym, Stoner Brooke.

- "Notes on the Culture of Greenhouse Plants" California Horticulturalist and Floral Magazine (May 1873)
- "Novarro", Overland monthly and Out West magazine (Dec. 1874)
- "A Breath of Trees," Alameda County Independent (June 12, 1875)
- "La Gaviota", Overland monthly and Out West magazine (Sep. 1875)
- "Notes from a Greenhouse - No. 1" California Horticulturalist and Floral Magazine (June 1877)
- "Notes from a Greenhouse - No. 2" California Horticulturalist and Floral Magazine (August 1877)
- "Notes from a Greenhouse - No.4" California Horticulturalist and Floral Magazine (Sep. 1877)
- "Notes from a Greenhouse - No.4" California Horticulturalist and Floral Magazine (Nov. 1877)
- " The Diospyrus Kaki, or Japanese Persimmon, in California." The Gardener's Monthly (Dec. 1877)
- "Concerning Shade Trees" California Horticulturalist and Floral Magazine (Dec. 1877)
- "Beneath Her Window" Atlantic Monthly (Dec. 1877)
- "Laying Out the Garden" California Horticulturalist and Floral Magazine (January 1878)
- "Peculiar Drawbacks of California Farming" California Horticulturalist and Floral Magazine (February 1878)
- "Horticultural Gossip" California Horticulturalist and Floral Magazine (March 1878)
- "Californian Flower Notes" Vick's Illustrated monthly magazine (April 1878)
- "Concerning Our Horticultural Future" California Horticulturalist and Floral Magazine (May 1878)"
- "The Art of Beautifying Our Homes" Southern California horticulturist (May 1878)
- "The Resources and History of Shasta County. - Part 1" Pacific Rural Press (22 June 1878)
- "A California Garden" Gardener's Monthly (June 1878)
- "Garden Notes for July" California Horticulturalist and Floral Magazine (July 1878)
- "Hot-Weather Plants" Southern California horticulturist (July 1878)
- "Garden Notes for August" California Horticulturalist and Floral Magazine (August 1878)
- "The Rhododenron" California Horticulturalist and Floral Magazine (August 1880)
- "Della" California Horticulturalist and Floral Magazine (October 1880)
- "Seeds and Seed Planting" California Horticulturalist and Floral Magazine (August 1878)
- "Flower Voices" California Horticulturalist and Floral Magazine (October 1878) A same-named poem in Hearth and Home was reviewed in the Daily Encinal (16 May 1874) which mentioned he had dropped his nom-de-plume Philomathean.
- "Her Rose Garden" Pacific Rural Press (30 Nov. 1878) Note that Shinn's Nurseries in Niles were in operation at this time. Also note the following letter to the editor "House-Hunting in Shasta County" about his previous article.
- "Her Rose Garden. Being a Tale of Two Young Married People, and their Gardening Mishaps; Chapter II" (7 Dec. 1878)
- "Her Rose Garden. Being a Tale of Two Young Married People, and their Gardening Mishaps; Chapter III" (14 Dec. 1878).
- "Concerning a Satisfactory Flower Garden" December 1878 Note that CHS is editor: "Mr. Shinn is a young man of much literary promise, who has contributed horticultural articles to the Evening Bulletin, Rural Press, our own journal, the Southern California Horticulturist, the Gardener's Monthly, Vick's Monthly, the Rural New Yorker, and The Garden of London. His work has all been of a fresh and yet practical type, and has been widely read and copied."
- "Her Rose Garden. Being a Tale of Two Young Married People, and their Gardening Mishaps; Chapter IV" (4 Jan. 1879).
- "Her Rose Garden. Being a Tale of Two Young Married People, and their Gardening Mishaps; Chapter V" (11 Jan. 1879).
- "The Land of Gladness" California Horticulturalist and Floral Magazine (March 1880)
- "Remembrances of a Mountain School" California Horticulturalist and Floral Magazine (April 1880)
- "On Certain Methods of Pruning Ornamentals" California Horticulturalist and Floral Magazine (May 1880)
- "The Rhododendron Woods" California Horticulturalist and Floral Magazine (June 1880)
- "A Summer in the Saddle" The Californian, June 6, 1880
- "Future Gardens of California" The Californian, August 1880
- "Half an Hour with the Poets" California Horticulturalist and Floral Magazine (Nov. Dec. 1880)
- "For the Last Time" California Horticulturalist and Floral Magazine (Nov. Dec. 1880) Notice that this is the last issue and that it would be merged into the Pacific Rural Press. CHS moved to the San Francisco Bulletin.
- "Peace" The Californian (July 1882) Note that this is after the article by H.U.C.
- "Evil Literature" The Californian (November 1882)
- "Oxford University, and the Humanist Movement of 1498" (Mar. 1883)
- "Guppy's Daughter", Overland Monthly (Aug. 1883)
- "The Migration Problem", Overland monthly and Out West magazine (Sept 1883)
- "Thomas Lodge and His Friends", Overland monthly and Out West magazine (Feb. 1884)
- "California Mining Camps", Overland monthly and Out West magazine (Aug 1884)
- "A Rhododendron Quest", Overland monthly and Out West magazine (June 1885)
- "Early Horticulture in California", Overland Monthly (Aug. 1885)
- "Shasta Lilies", Overland Monthly (Dec 1885)
- "Spring Flowers of California", Overland monthly and Out West magazine (Apr. 1888)
- "Artesian Belt of the Upper San Joaquin", Overland Monthly (Aug. 1888) with illustrations by Ernest Peixotto
- "Early Books, Magazines, and Book-Making", Overland Monthly (Oct. 1888)
- "From Klamath to the Rio Grande", Overland monthly and Out West magazine (Dec. 1888)
- "The California Palestine", Overland monthly and Out West magazine (Jan. 1889)
- "Two Shasta Desperados" (May 1889) p. 459 under pseudonym Stoner Brooke.
- "The Building of Arachne", The Argonaut, 1889
- "The Big Tree." Garden and Forest, 1889; 2: 614-615.
- "The Forest; Recent California Forest Fires", Garden and Forest, (Oct. 9,1889)
- "Old Mission San Jose Gardens", Garden and Forest (Sept. 11, 1889)
- "California Garden Gold", American Gardening (Jan. 1890)
- "Wintering in California,"
- "An Early Winter Garden in California", American Gardening (Feb. 1890)
- "The Olive in California", American Gardening (Apr. 1890)
- "Spanish Pioneer Houses of California", the Magazine of American History (May 1890)
- "The Japanese Oranges", American Gardening (Jun. 1890)
- "The Quicksands of Toro", Belford's Magazine (Jun. 1890-Nov.1890), p. 735-739 According to the Wall Street Journal article by Ben Zimmer May 9/10 2020 "From 'The Three Stooges to Covid-19 Rulebreakers," this article is the first instance of the use of the word "Knucklehead"
- "Fourth of July in Rosamond Camp" The Wasp (1890)
- "Father Agapius Honcharenko" The Christian Union (July 1890)
- "An Old-Fashioned Countryside", American Gardening (Aug. 1890)
- "California Truck-Gardening", American Gardening (Oct. 1890)
- "California on Horseback. " (November 1890)
- "Notes from a Pacific Peach Orchard", American Gardening (Dec. 1890)
- "In a Spouting Funnel" The Wasp (1890)
- "Pioneer Spanish Families in California; With Special Reference to the Vallejos" The Century Illustrated Monthly Magazine (January 1891)
- "California Rose Cottages", Vick's Illustrated Monthly Magazine (1891) Note that p. 48 has a photograph of the Shinn House.
- "Social Changes in California" The Popular Science Monthly (April 1891)
- "The California Lakes", Overland monthly and Out West magazine (July 1891)
- "Ecce Montezuma" Goldthwaite's Geographical Magazine (November 1, 1891)
- "Mission Bells" The Overland Monthly (Jan. 1892)
- "Fig trees at the experiment stations" 1892
- "Picturesque Plant Life of California" Century Magazine (October 1892)
- "Yachting Around San Francisco Bay (March 1893)
- "California Birds; Their Life in Garden and Orchard - The Yellow-Hammers, Half-Tamed Quail, and Saucy Baltimore Orioles - A Blossom Eating Revel" The Evening Post, New York (April 8, 1893)
- "Irrigation in the Arid States" The Popular Science Monthly (June 1893)
- "The Fruit Industry in California" The Popular Science Monthly (December 1893)
- "Agriculture and Horticulture at the Midwinter Fair", Overland monthly and Out West magazine (Apr. 1894)
- "Apples at the Midwinter Fair" Garden and Forest (Apr. 4, 1894)
- "A California Garden" Garden and Forest (June 6, 1894)
- "Pacific Coast Seedling Fruits" Garden and Forest (June 20, 1894)
- "Among the Experiment Stations" The Overland Monthly (August 1894)
- "California Experiment Centres" Garden and Forest (Nov. 7, 1894)
- "A Glimpse of a Californian Wild Garden" The Garden: An Illustrated Weekly Journal of Gardening in All Its Branches (April 11, 1896)
- "Correspondence, Notes from Santa Barbara" Garden and Forest (June 17, 1896)
- "The Wild Gardens of the Sierra" The Garden, An Illustrated Weekly Journal of Gardening in All Its Branches (Sep. 26, 1896)
- "Nevada Silver" The Popular Science Monthly (Oct. 1896)
- "Overland Monthly Reports: California Forests", Overland monthly and Out West magazine (May 1897)
- "Northern California Gold Fields; Glimpses of Shasta, Trinity, and Siskiyou", Overland monthly and Out West magazine. (Dec. 1897)
- "Californian Forests", California: early history, commercial position, climate, scenery, forests, general resources (1897-1898)
- "Forestry Problems of the San Joaquin", Overland monthly and Out West magazine (Aug. 1899)
- "The Old Tioga Road", Overland monthly and Out West magazine (Nov. 1899)
- "Citrus Fruits—Their History and Literature" (Mar. 1901)
- "A Wizard of the Garden" (Mar. 1901)
- "Wizards of the Gardens (Third Paper) Carl Purdy and the Native Bulbs" (May 1901)
- Intensive Horticulture in California (1901) reprint from "The Land of Sunshine" about Luther Burbank and Carl Purdy
- "A Study of San Luis Obispo County, California", Sunset (Sept. 1901)
- "Experimental Agriculture in California", Sunset (Nov. 1901)
- "The Story of a Great California Estate; Rancho del Arroyo Chico, the Home of the late General John Bidwell" (Jan. 1902)
- "Back of the Backwoods," (April 1904)
- "The Alvarado Squatters League" Out West magazine (1907)
- "Old Man Chepo" The Craftsman
- "Restoring an Apple Orchard; How I made an Old Abandoned Orchard Profitable" Fresno Bee September 21, 1912
- "National Forest “ Mosaics ” Latest in Photography" Morning Union August 1, 1919
- "Sierra Gold" Overland Monthly (Apr. 1922)

=== Articles in The standard cyclopedia of horticulture ===
- The fig in California p. 1235-1238
- Early horticulture in California in particular p. 1506-1509
- John Rock p. 1593
- James Shinn p. 1596
- The sequoias p. 3154-3156

=== Publications of the University of California ===
- Verses in College Verses, along with verses from his sisters, Milicent Shinn and Annie Shinn, and his cousin Edmund Clark Sanford
- Experiments with deciduous fruits at and near the Southern Coast Range sub-station, Paso Robles, from 1889 to 1902
- The Russian Thistle in California 1895
- The Australian Salt-Bushes 1899
- Report of the Agricultural Experiment Station of the University of California, for the Years of 1891–1892, various reports
- Report of the Agricultural Experiment Station of the University of California, for the Years of 1892–1893 and some 1894, Viticultural work 1887-1893
- Report of the Agricultural Experiment Station of the University of California, for the Years of 1897–1898, various reports
- Report of the Agricultural Experiment Station of the University of California, for the Years of 1898–1901, various reports
- Report of the Agricultural Experiment Station of the University of California, for the Years of 1901–1903, various reports

=== Publications of the USDA ===
- An Economic Study of Acacias (1913)
- Let's know some trees (1925)

=== Books ===
- Pacific Rural Handbook (1879)
- Land Laws of Mining Districts (1884)
- Mining Camps, a Study in American Frontier Government (1885), republished in 1948
- Graphic description of Pacific coast outlaws. Thrilling exploits of their arch-enemy Sheriff Harry N. Morse (1887)
- Cooperation on the Pacific Coast (1888)
- Pioneer Spanish Families of California (1891)
- The Story of the Mine, as Illustrated by the Great Comstock Lode of Nevada (1896) and review
- Culture work at the substations, 1899–1901 (1902)
- Chapters in Picturesque California, edited by John Muir, finished in October 1894
  - "The Foothill Region of the Northern Coast-Range: Sonoma, Napa, and Solano Valleys"
  - "The Tule Region"
  - "The Land of the Redwood"

=== Newspapers ===
- "How Chinamen Strike" New York Times May 27, 1890
- Historical Sketches of Southern Alameda County (1991) contains a collection of Shinn's articles from the Oakland Enquirer (8 June - 18 Nov 1889).
- "The Writing in the Geode" (Warragul [Australia] Guardian, July 11, 1890 and Raymond [Canada] Rustler, Dec. 9, 1910) (fictional Hollow Earth story partly set in the underground, western Canada)

=== Letters ===
- Papers of Daniel Coit Gilman. Daniel Coit Gilman was Johns Hopkins University's first president, serving from 1876 to 1902
- John Muir Papers. Charles Howard Shinn and Milicent Shinn have letters in this collection.

=== Shinn's Library ===
- In 1917, Charles Howard Shinn's library was listed for auction "Catalogue of the Library of Mr. Charles Howard Shinn; The Well Known Writer on California"
  - History of the buried treasure on Cocos Island, and confession of the pirates the night before execution, in Kingston, Jamaica. Signed by C.H. Shinn

=== Online Books ===
- "Shinn, Charles Howard, 1852-1924". onlinebooks.library.upenn.edu.

=== Biographies and Memorials and Mentions ===
- Forestry Education at the University of California; The first fifty Years, Paul Casamajor
- "Charles Howard Shinn; Forest Pioneer" American Forests (August 1924)
- Charles Howard Shinn, Sierra Club Bulletin
- "Interesting Out-Door Men; Charles Howard Shinn; the Missionary of California Forestry" Stockton Daily Evening Record (July 05, 1924) Includes a caricature
- "Ranger Shinn; The Story of a Man Who Shaped His Life to Get the Greatest Happiness"; Dec. 1924, Sunset Magazine
- "The Ever-Changing View; A History of the National Forests in California, 1891-1987" Anthony Godfrey, Ph.D. July 2005 R5-FR-004 USDA Forest Service, California
- Urbane Bouquets: A Floricultural History of California, 1848 to 1915, Elizabeth A. Logan, Dissertation August 2013

=== Current References ===
- Wall Street Journal, May 8, 2020, "‘Knucklehead’: From ‘The Three Stooges’ to COVID-19 Rulebreakers", Ben Zimmer, refers to "Quicksands of Toro"

=== Shinn Historical Park & Arboretum ===
Shinn Historical Park & Arboretum is a city park in Fremont, California and is the last 4 acres of Shinn's Nurseries and the Shinn Ranch. Three groups are active in the park. The Friends of Heirloom Flowers is the garden club that, since 1994, has taken care of the gardens around the historic Shinn House built in 1876, the Shinn Bungalow built around 1907, and the Sim Cottage built before 1856. The Mission Peak Heritage Foundation (MPHF) has managed the Shinn House since 1972 and the Shinn House museum since 2002. The Chinese Bunkhouse Preservation Project is a subcommittee of the MPHF and was formed to preserve the last remaining building from the Shinn Ranch China Camp. The website Shinn Historical Park & Arboretum links the official websites of the four organizations.
