= Horace J. and Ann S. Shinn Cottage =

Historic house in Oregon, United States

- U.S. National Register of Historic Places
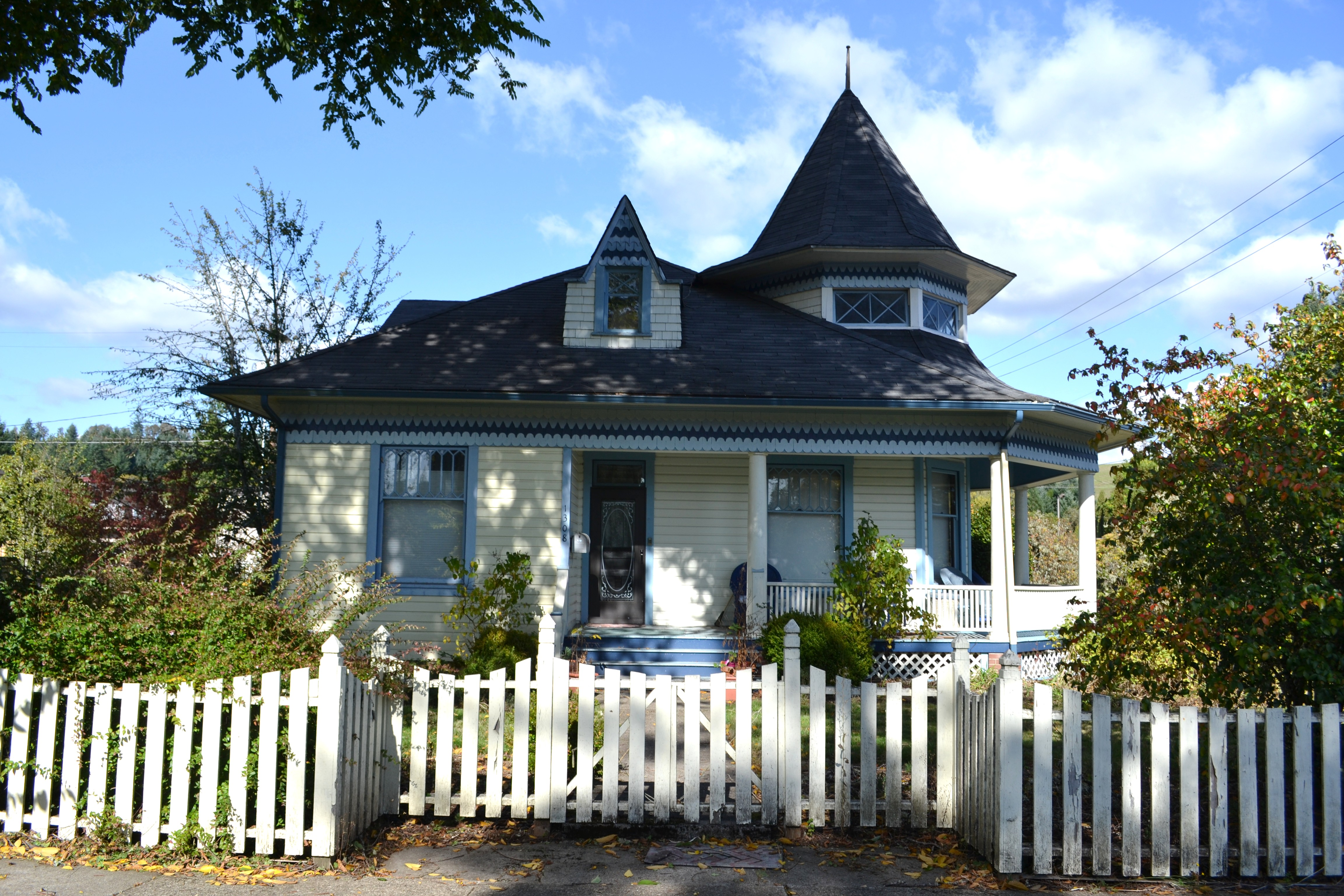
- Shinn Cottage in 2011

- Location within Oregon Location within the United States
- Location: 1308 Ash Avenue
- Nearest city: Cottage Grove, Oregon
- Coordinates: 43.798889°N 123.069444°W
- Built: 1904
- NRHP reference No.: 98000206
- Added to NRHP: March 5, 1988

The Horace J. and Ann S. Shinn Cottage, in Cottage Grove, Oregon, is listed on the National Register of Historic Places. It was built in 1904, and is located at 1308 Ash Avenue.

== See also ==
- National Register of Historic Places listings in Lane County, Oregon
