= Pauline Elizabeth Scarborough =

American psychology historian

- Born: March 30, 1935; Ruston, Louisiana, U.S.
- Died: August 18, 2015 (aged 80)
- Occupations: Psychologist, Historian
- Awards: APA Lifetime Achievement Award

Pauline Elizabeth Scarborough (30 March 1935 – 18 August 2015) was an American historian of Psychology, born in Ruston, Louisiana. Scarborough transformed the understanding of early American Psychology through her work on the role and impact of women in the field.

In 1968 she co-founded Cheiron, the International Society for the History of the Behavioral and Social Sciences, an organization aimed to advocate international, interdisciplinary and collaborative research in the History of Behavioral and Social Sciences.

From 1980, Scarborough served as the chair of the Psychology department of the State University of New York, College at Fredonia. Later, in 1991, she held a position as the dean of Liberal Arts and Sciences in Indiana University, South Bend, until she retired.

In cooperation with another historian of Psychology, Laurel Furumoto, she published their most famous book in 1987: Untold Lives: The First Generation of American Women Psychologists. In 2001, Scarborough received a Lifetime Achievement Award from the Division 26 of the American Psychological Association (APA), in which she held a position as the president.

== Early life and education ==
Scarborough was born on March 30, 1935, in Ruston, Louisiana. She was the first child to her father, Truett Scarborough and her mother, Helen Pauline Scarborough. Her father was a lawyer, whereas her mother, Pauline Scarborough, stayed at home with Scarborough and her two siblings. When Scarborough was twelve years old, her mother died. Her father went on to remarry and have another child. However, when Scarborough was only fourteen years old, her father died of a cerebral haemorrhage. This left her and her siblings in an unfavourable financial situation.

Two weeks after Scarborough's high school graduation, she moved to Texas and started courses at Southern Methodist University. She graduated with a BA in Psychology from Hardin-Simmons University. Scarborough began working towards her graduate degree in religious education at the Carver School of Missions and Social Work in Louisville, Kentucky. She then met Earl Goodman, a baptist minister, whom she later married. Scarborough discontinued her studies in Kentucky and moved with Goodman to New Hampshire where he pursued an academic career in family therapy. At the University of New Hampshire, Durham, Scarborough received her MA in Experimental Psychology in 1966. Goodman moved to Northern Illinois University, De Kalb, and Scarborough started presenting her dissertation studies there.

== Personal life ==
After Scarborough married Earl Goodman in 1957, she continued her education and studies while also becoming a mother of two children, named Cathryn Elizabeth Goodman and David Earl Goodman. She later became a grandmother to four grandchildren.

Along with the multiple accomplishments in her academic life, Scarborough was involved in many clubs and organizations. She became a member of the Mishawaka, Indiana Lions club. She also enjoyed nature including roles as a conservationist involved in the Sierra Club and The Nature Conservancy, and a tour guide at the Potawatomi Zoo. Scarborough took an active role with Democratic Party politics. She was an advocate for social justice and women's rights.

== Later education and academic career ==
Elizabeth Scarborough was starting her PhD in New Hampshire when she found herself in a predicament—she had difficulty finding a supervisor. She was wife to a faculty member and considered to be an older student which made finding a PhD supervisor harder than normal. She was then assigned Robert Watson, a well-known name in psychology, as her supervisor. She assisted with his historical research thinking it would be superior to specific theoretical orientation which she disliked. Scarborough participated with Watson and his colleague, Joseph Brozeks, in a new institute for teaching the history of psychology. After the success of this institute, she later founded of a new society called Cheiron, which provided scholarships for the field of psychology. Cheiron is now the International Society for the History of the Social and Behavioral Sciences. It was an influential society in Scarborough's life. She was the only member who attended all 49 meetings during her lifetime. She became the executive officer in 1973 and remained so until 1980. With the help of palliative care, Scarborough attended her last Cheiron meeting in June 2015 in Kansas City.

When Scarborough was in Indiana, she was asked to write a paper about the history of women in the field of psychology. She knew of only three women, Christine Ladd-Franklin, Mary Whiton Calkins, and Margaret Floy Washburn. She found there were many forgotten women in the first generation of psychologists when she began her research. This continued for ten years with her collaborator, Laurel Furumoto, who had begun historical research in 1969. The women's movement was growing in importance during this time and a publisher came to them to discuss publishing their work when they had finished. They published the book, which was titled Untold Lives: The First Generation of American Women Psychologists, in 1987. The book touched on the struggles and lives of women in the field of psychology. Scarborough could personally relate to many of the struggles the women had gone through because she also had to manage a family and a career at the same time.

Her first year of teaching was at Fredonia University in New York. She was 42 years old at the time and had worked her way up in the academic world. This gave her an advantage at securing a position in the administration. She was next offered the position of chair in her department shortly after her first year. She also worked at Northern Illinois University in DeKalb, as an assistant in psychology at State University of New York, and then dean of the Faculty of Liberal Arts and Sciences at Indiana University South Point in 1991.

Outside of her work Scarborough became the president of the Society for the History of Psychology from 1990 to 1991, was a fellow of the American Psychological Association and the Association for Psychological Science, as well as a member of the advisory board of the Cummings Center for the History of Psychology.

== Achievements and recognition ==
In the late 1970s, Furumoto and Scarborough had solidified their partnership. They wrote their most notable book—Untold Lives: The First Generation of American Women Psychologists ( Columbia University Press)— in 1987. Choice later named it one of the Outstanding Academic Books of the year. It is significant because it provides detailed biographies of important female psychologists and, through their perspectives, details the unique struggles they faced and dealt with.

Scarborough was the co-founder of Cheiron and attended all 49 meetings while being on the executive from 1983-1990. Later, she became part of the American Psychological Association which includes Division 35 (Psychology of Women)] and division 26 (the Society for the History of Psychology). Eventually, she became the president of Division 26 in 1990-1991. This led to her being honored with the Lifetime Achievement Award in 2001. Scarborough's dedication and persistence earned her the right to have the annual meeting within the organization named the Elizabeth Scarborough Lecture in 2010.

== Published works ==
- Scarborough, E. (2005). "Constructing a Women's History of Psychology." The Feminist Psychologist, 32(1), p. 6.
- Scarborough, E. (2003). "Cheiron's Origins: Personal Recollections and a Photograph." Journal of the History of the Behavioral and Social Sciences, 40, 207-211.
- Scarborough, E. (1994). "Recognition for Women: The Problem of Linkage." Annals of the New York Academy of Sciences, 727, 101-111.
- Scarborough, E. (1992). "Mrs. Ricord and Psychology for Women, circa 1840." American Psychologist, 47, 274-280.
- Scarborough, E. (1990). "Margart Floy Washburn." In A. N. O'Connell & N. Felipe Russo (Eds.), Women in psychology: A Bio-bibliographic Sourcebook (pp. 342–349). Westport, CT: Greenwood Press.
- Scarborough, E. (1988). "The History of Psychology Course." In P. Bronstein & K. Quina (Eds.), Teaching the Psychology of Persons: Resources for Gender and Sociocultural Awareness (pp. 88–98). Washington, DC: American Psychological Association.
- Furumoto, L. & Scarborough, E. (1987). "Placing Women in the History of Comparative Psychology: Margaret Floy Washburn and Margaret Morse Nice." In E. Tobach (Ed.), Historical Perspectives and the International Status of Comparative Psychology (pp. 103–117). Hillsdale, NJ: Erlbaum.
- Scarborough, E. & Furumoto, L. (1987). Untold Lives: The First Generation of American Women Psychologists. New York: Columbia University Press.
- Furumoto, L. & Scarborough, E. (1986). "Placing Women in the History of Psychology: The First American Women Psychologists." American Psychologist, 41, 35-42.
- Goodman, E. S. (1980). "Margaret F. Washburn (1871-1939): First Woman Ph.D. in Psychology", Psychology of Women Quarterly, 5, 69-80.
