= Powellton, Illinois =

- Unincorporated community
- Location within Illinois Location within the United States
- Coordinates: 40°32′09″N 91°16′08″W
- Country: United States
- State: Illinois
- County: Hancock
- Elevation: 692 ft (211 m)
- Time zone: UTC-6 (Central (CST))
  - Summer (DST): UTC-5 (CDT)
- Area code: 217
- GNIS feature ID: 423084

Powellton is an unincorporated community in Sonora Township, Hancock County, Illinois, United States. The community is located along County Route 15 6.2 miles (10.0 km) east of Nauvoo.
