= Sonora Township, Hancock County, Illinois =

Sonora Township
- Township
- Township building

- Location in Hancock County

- Hancock County's location in Illinois
- Coordinates: 40°30′12″N 91°18′10″W
- Country: United States
- State: Illinois
- County: Hancock
- Established: November 6, 1849

Area
  - Total: 37.52 sq mi (97.2 km^{2})
  - Land: 35.79 sq mi (92.7 km^{2})
  - Water: 1.73 sq mi (4.5 km^{2}) 4.60%
- Elevation: 659 ft (201 m)

Population (2020)
  - Total: 437
  - Density: 12.2/sq mi (4.71/km^{2})
- Time zone: UTC-6 (CST)
  - Summer (DST): UTC-5 (CDT)
- ZIP codes: 62318, 62341, 62354, 62358
- FIPS code: 17-067-70499

Sonora Township is one of twenty-four townships in Hancock County, Illinois, USA. As of the 2020 census, its population was 437 and it contained 246 housing units.

== Geography ==
According to the 2021 census gazetteer files, Sonora Township has a total area of 37.52 square miles (97.18 km^{2}), of which 35.79 square miles (92.70 km^{2}) (or 95.40%) is land and 1.73 square miles (4.48 km^{2}) (or 4.60%) is water.

=== Cities, towns, villages ===
- Nauvoo (east edge)

=== Unincorporated towns ===
- Powellton at 40.535877°N 91.26876°W

(This list is based on USGS data and may include former settlements.)

=== Extinct towns ===
- Sonora at 40.494210°N 91.354874°W

(These towns are listed as "historical" by the USGS.)

=== Cemeteries ===
The township contains these seven cemeteries: Nauvoo City, Nauvoo Two, Oak Grove, Pioneer Saints, Saints Peter and Paul, Sterns and Thornber.

=== Major highways ===
- Illinois Route 96

=== Airports and landing strips ===
- Cedar Ridge Airport
- Sinele Strip

=== Landmarks ===
- Mormon Cemetery
- Oak Grove Cemetery
- Sterne Cemetery

== Demographics ==
Historical population
Census	Pop.	Note	%±
1860	1,054		—
1870	1,485		40.9%
1880	1,401		−5.7%
1890	1,098		−21.6%
1900	1,094		−0.4%
1910	966		−11.7%
1920	821		−15.0%
1930	763		−7.1%
1940	880		15.3%
1950	676		−23.2%
1960	616		−8.9%
1970	576		−6.5%
1980	626		8.7%
1990	537		−14.2%
2000	492		−8.4%
2010	494		0.4%
2020	437		−11.5%
U.S. Decennial Census

As of the 2020 census there were 437 people, 205 households, and 172 families residing in the township. The population density was 11.65 inhabitants per square mile (4.50/km^{2}). There were 246 housing units at an average density of 6.56 per square mile (2.53/km^{2}). The racial makeup of the township was 95.42% White, 0.92% African American, 0.46% Native American, 0.23% Asian, 0.00% Pacific Islander, 0.69% from other races, and 2.29% from two or more races. Hispanic or Latino of any race were 2.29% of the population.

There were 205 households, out of which 22.90% had children under the age of 18 living with them, 63.90% were married couples living together, 20.00% had a female householder with no spouse present, and 16.10% were non-families. 16.10% of all households were made up of individuals, and 13.70% had someone living alone who was 65 years of age or older. The average household size was 2.89 and the average family size was 3.20.

The township's age distribution consisted of 22.3% under the age of 18, 8.4% from 18 to 24, 17.4% from 25 to 44, 35.3% from 45 to 64, and 16.7% who were 65 years of age or older. The median age was 48.9 years. For every 100 females, there were 117.2 males. For every 100 females age 18 and over, there were 106.7 males.

The median income for a household in the township was $64,531, and the median income for a family was $68,571. Males had a median income of $31,528 versus $29,327 for females. The per capita income for the township was $26,330. About 1.7% of families and 7.4% of the population were below the poverty line, including 21.2% of those under age 18 and 0.0% of those age 65 or over.

== School districts ==
- Hamilton Community Consolidated School District 328
- Nauvoo-Colusa Community Unit School District 325

== Political districts ==
- Illinois's 18th congressional district
- State House District 94
- State Senate District 47
