= Michelle Shinn =

American laser scientist

Michelle D. Shinn is an American laser scientist. She is program manager for industrial concepts in the Office of Nuclear Physics at the United States Department of Energy.

== Education and career ==
Shinn is from Oklahoma, and was educated in physics at Oklahoma State University, where she earned a bachelor's degree in 1978, a master's in 1980, and a Ph.D. in 1983.

She became a researcher in the laser division of the Lawrence Livermore National Laboratory in 1984; her work there involved the development of a solid-state laser doped with promethium, unusual because of the radioactive nature of its dopant. She became an associate professor at Bryn Mawr College in 1990, but in 1995 returned to federal laser research, in the Thomas Jefferson National Accelerator Facility in Virginia, where her work involved free-electron lasers. After becoming chief optical scientist at the Jefferson Lab, she took her present post as a program manager in the Department of Energy in 2016.

== Recognition ==
Shinn was named a Fellow of the American Physical Society (APS) in 2012, after a nomination from the APS Forum on Industrial & Applied Physics, "for contributions in the applications of lasers in society, particularly the development of high power optics technologies for rare earth solid-state lasers and free-electron lasers".

In 2019, Oklahoma State University named her as one of its distinguished alumni.
