= Powellton, Virginia =

Unincorporated community in Virginia, United States

Coordinates: 36°40′01″N 77°47′32″W

Powellton is an unincorporated community located in Brunswick County, Virginia, United States.
