= Mount Shinn (California) =

Mountain in California, United States

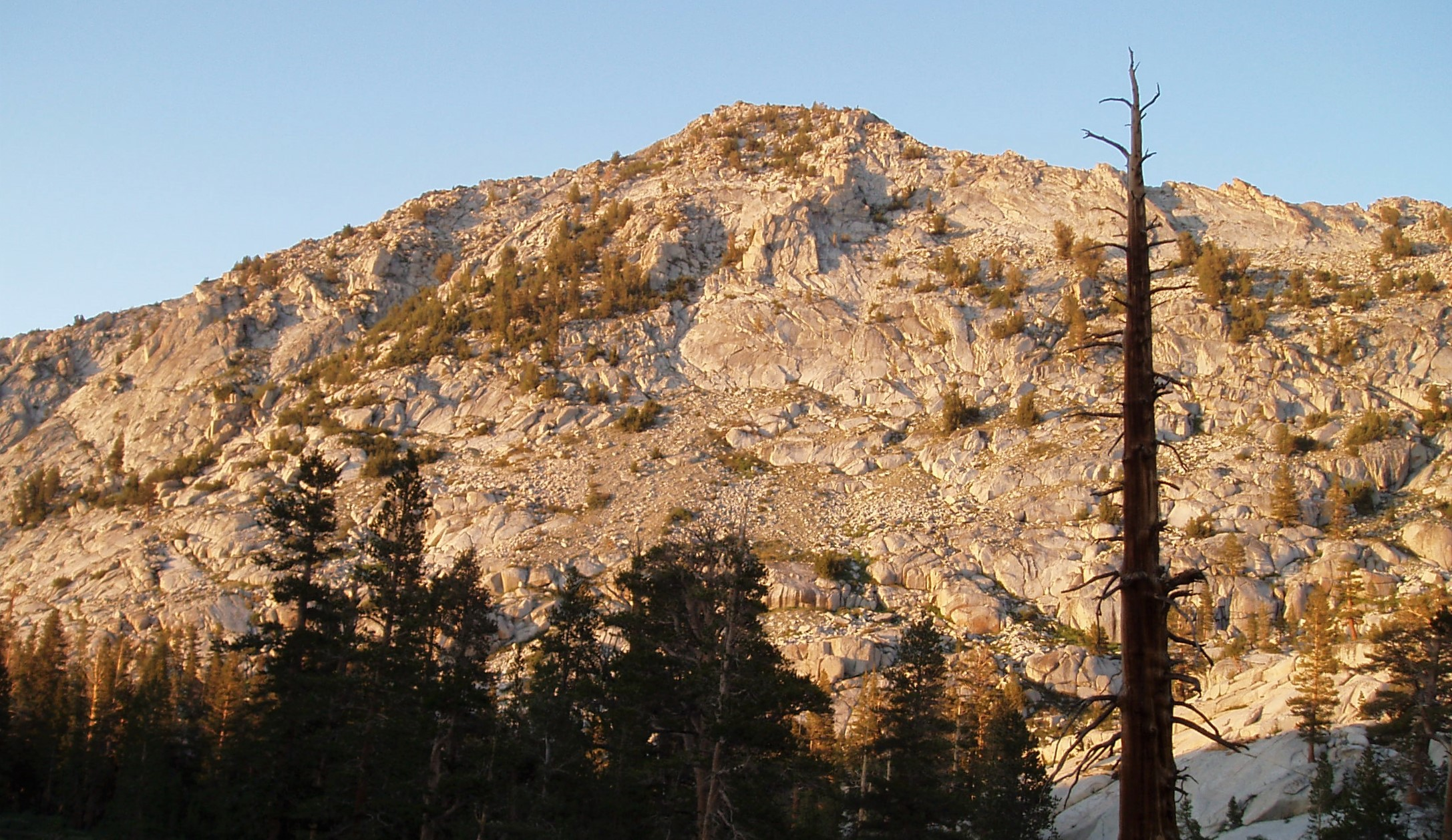
- West aspect

Highest point
- Elevation: 10,995 ft (3,351 m)
- Prominence: 560 ft (171 m)
- Parent peak: Zingheim Heights (11,138 ft)
- Isolation: 3.96 mi (6.37 km)
- Coordinates: 37°12′44″N 118°55′10″W

Naming
- Etymology: Charles Howard Shinn

Geography
- Location within California Location within the United States
- Location: Fresno County, California, U.S.
- Parent range: Sierra Nevada
- Topo map: USGS Ward Mountain

Geology
- Rock age: Cretaceous
- Mountain type: Fault block
- Rock type: Granodiorite

Climbing
- First ascent: 1925
- Easiest route: class 2 West slope

Mount Shinn is a 10,995-foot-elevation (3,351-meter) mountain summit located west of the crest of the Sierra Nevada mountain range in Fresno County of northern California, United States. It is set within the John Muir Wilderness, on land managed by Sierra National Forest. Precipitation runoff from this mountain drains north to Florence Lake via tributaries of the South Fork San Joaquin River. Topographic relief is significant as the summit rises 3,600 feet (1,100 meters) above this river in less than two miles.

== History ==
The mountain's name was proposed by members of the U.S. Forest Service to honor Charles Howard Shinn (1852–1924), forest supervisor of Sierra National Forest. He was also a charter member of the Sierra Club and author. This landform's toponym was officially adopted in 1925 by the U.S. Board on Geographic Names.

The first ascent of the summit was made August 8, 1925, by Francis A. Corey.

== Climate ==
According to the Köppen climate classification system, Mount Shinn is located in an alpine climate zone. Most weather fronts originate in the Pacific Ocean, and travel east toward the Sierra Nevada mountains. As fronts approach, they are forced upward by the peaks (orographic lift), causing them to drop their moisture in the form of rain or snowfall onto the range.

== Gallery ==
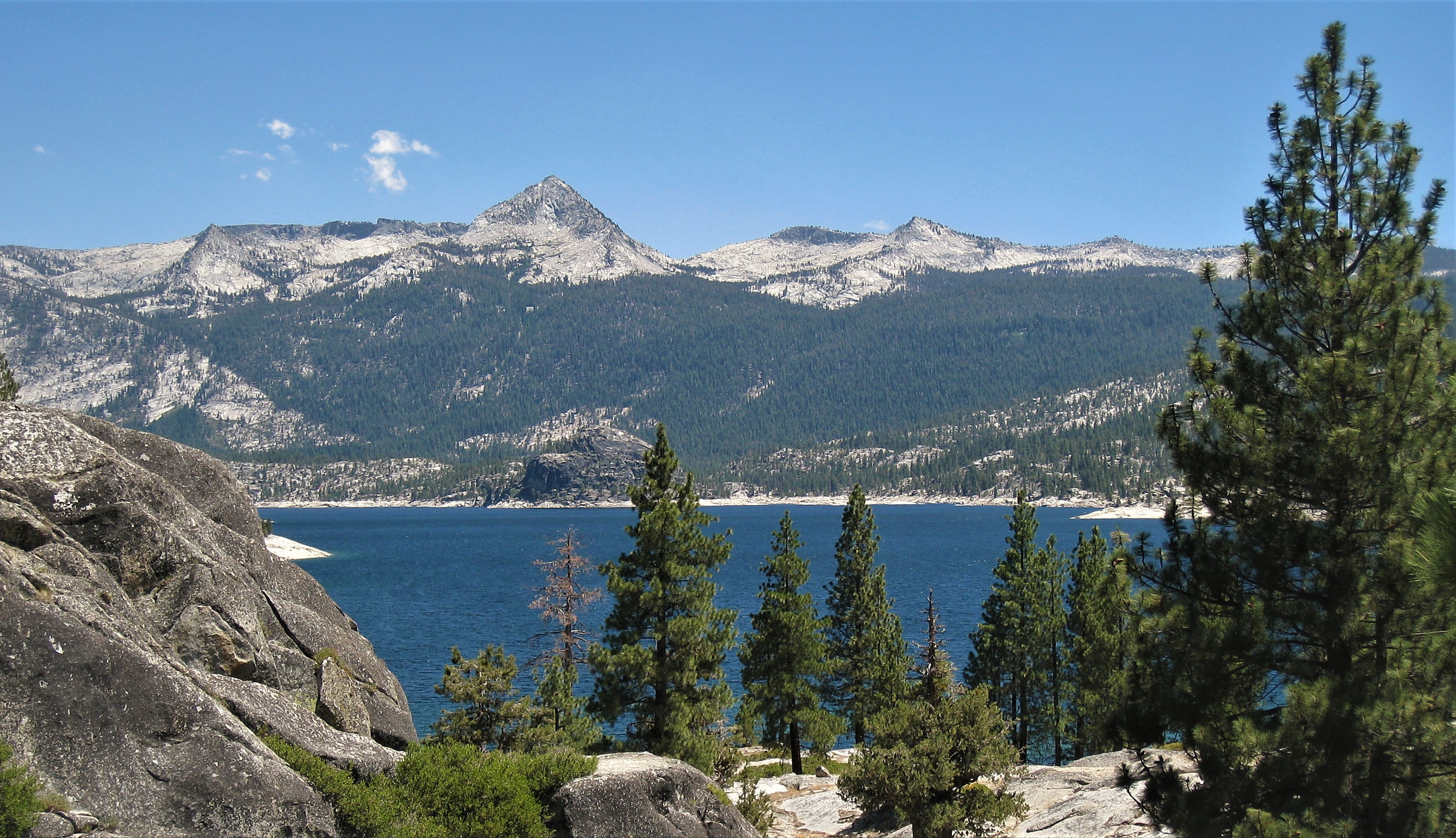
Northwest aspect of Mt. Shinn seen with Florence Lake

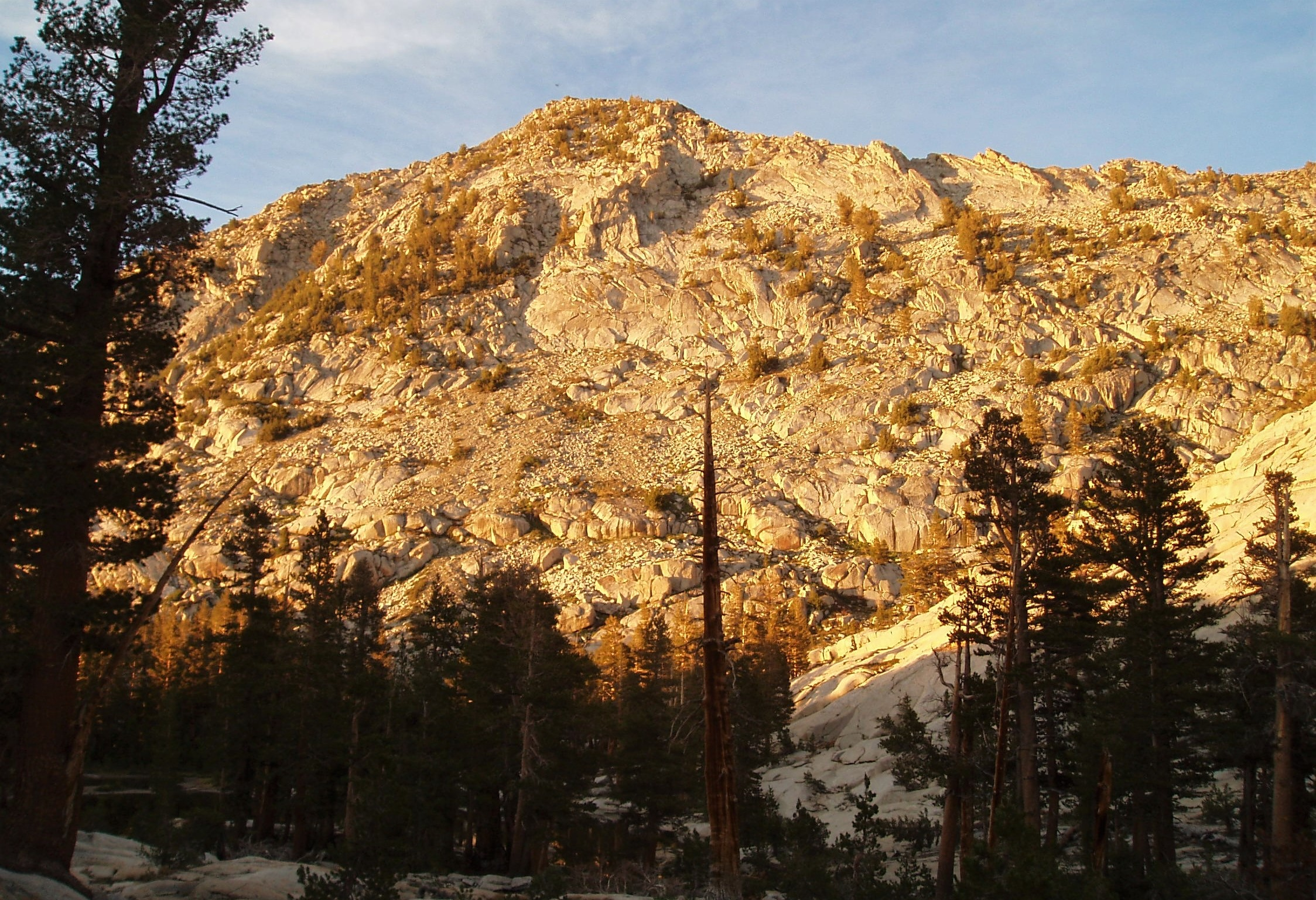
Evening on west slope

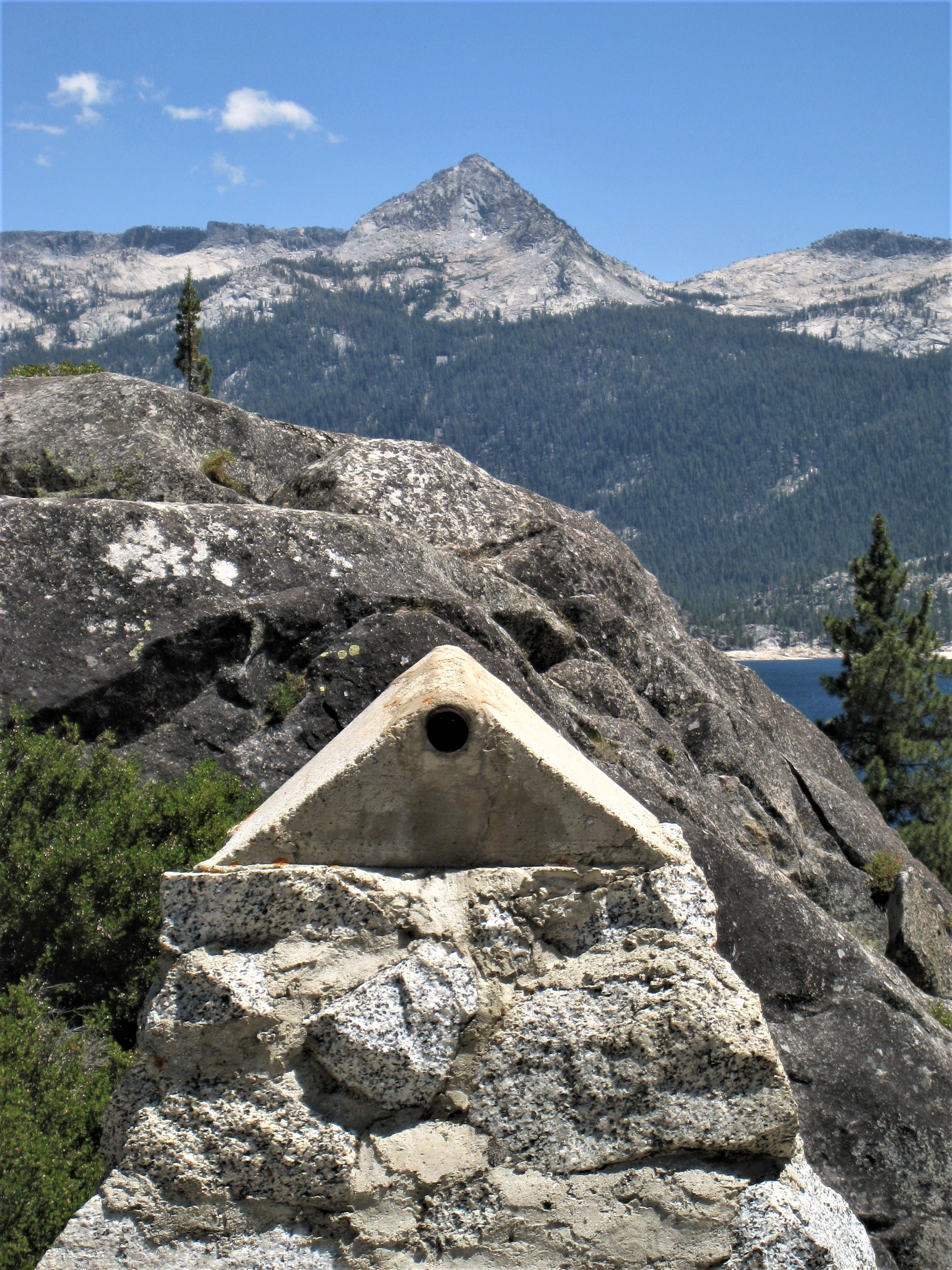
Mt. Shinn sight pipe

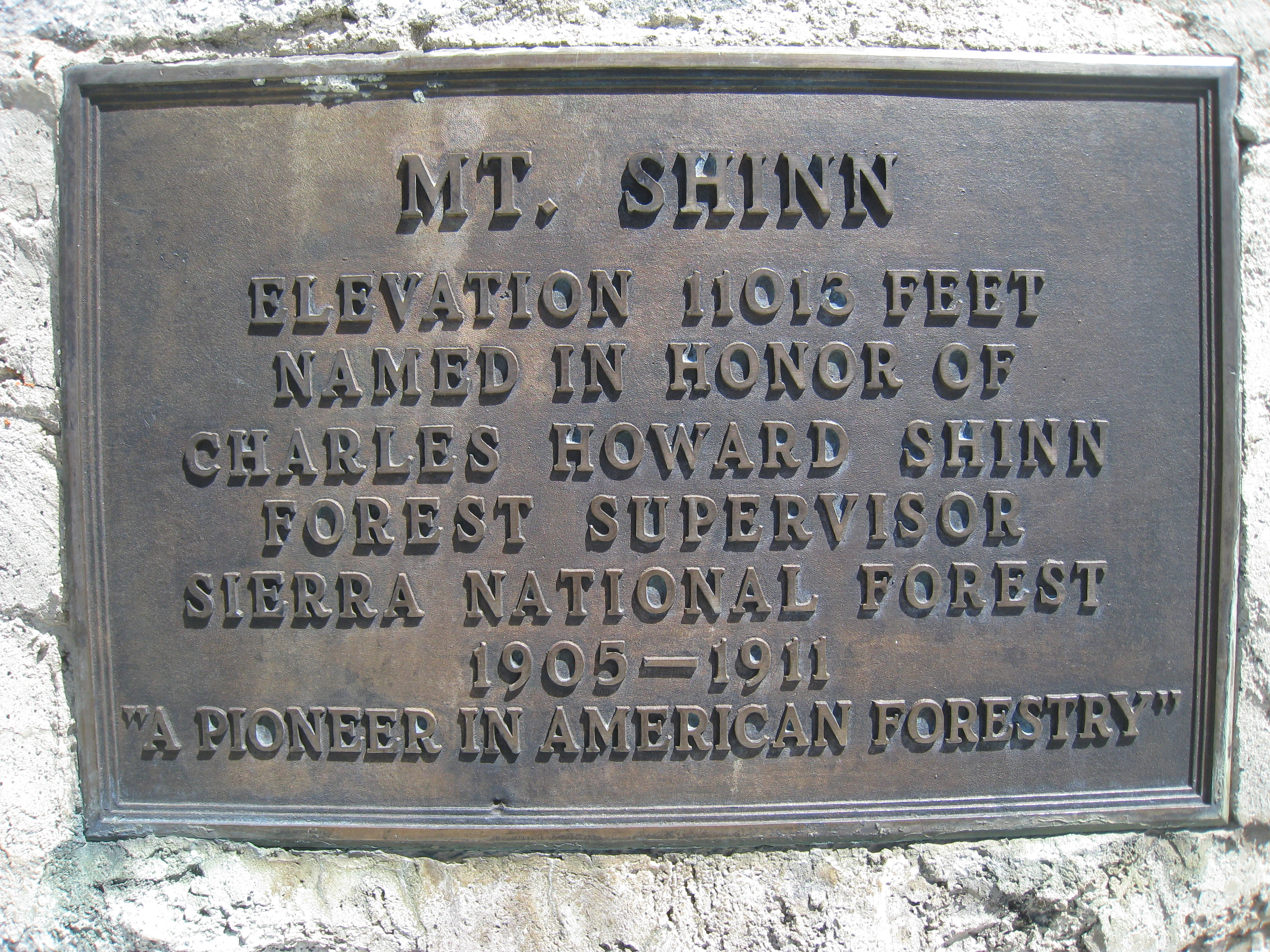
Commemorative plaque

== See also ==
- List of mountain peaks of California
