= Edmund Sanford =

Edmund Clark Sanford
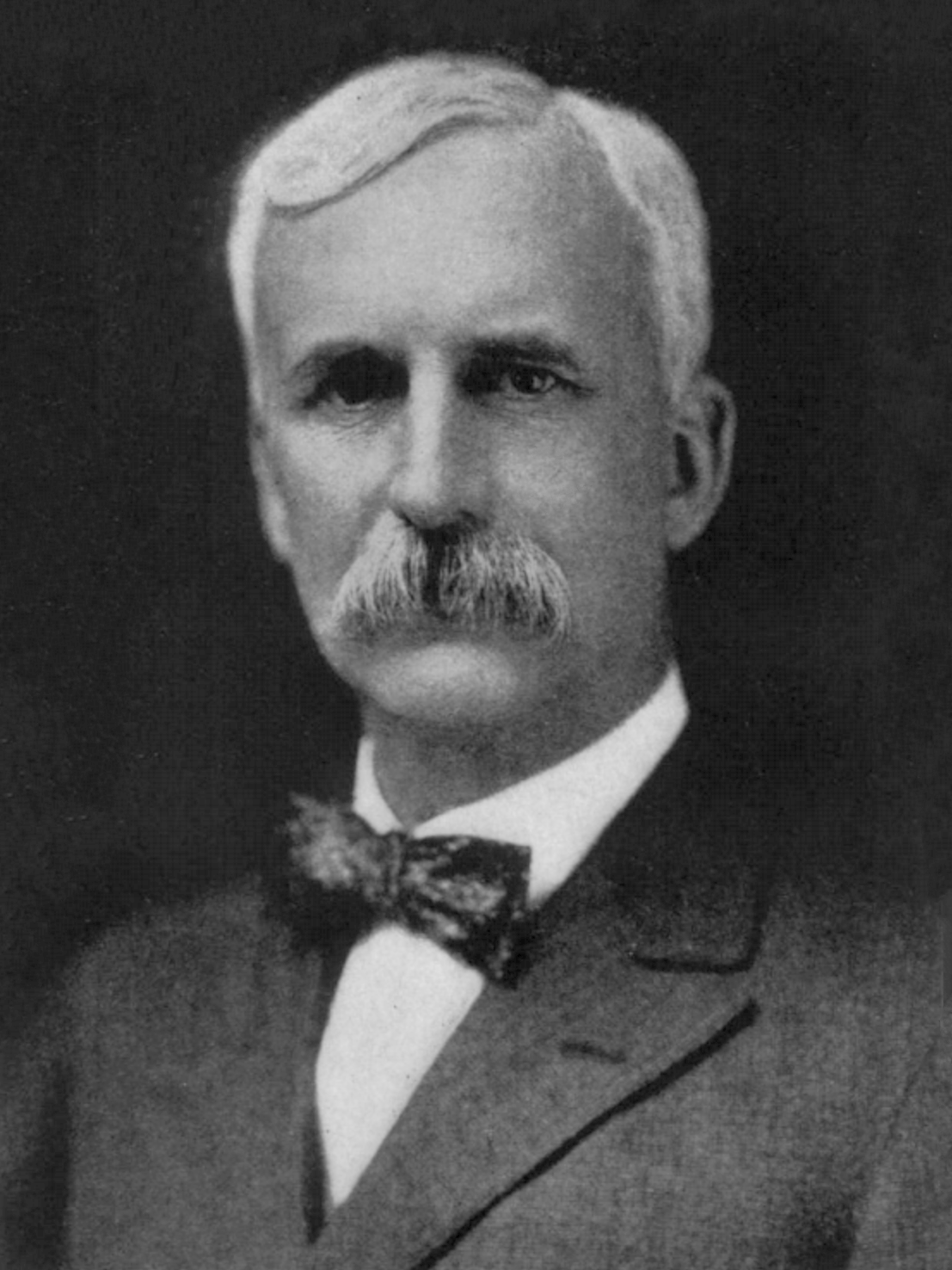
- Born: November 10, 1859; Oakland, Alameda County, CA, US
- Died: November 22, 1924 (aged 65); Boston, Suffolk County, MA, US
- Burial place: Mountain View Cemetery (Oakland, California)
- Education: AB, University of California, Berkeley, 1883
- Alma mater: Johns Hopkins University
- Title: President of Clark University
- Term: 1909-1920
- Relatives: Milicent Shinn (cousin)

Edmund Clark Sanford (1859–1924) was an early American psychologist. He earned his PhD under the supervision of Granville Stanley Hall at Johns Hopkins University, and then moved with Hall to Clark University in 1888, where he became the professor of psychology and the founding director of the psychology laboratory. He is best known for his 1887 Writings of Laura Bridgman and for his 1897 textbook, A Course in Experimental Psychology. This textbook was a manual on how to conduct experiential psychology. He was present at the creation of the American Psychological Association in 1892 and the creation of the Association of American Universities in 1900. He was the cousin of another early psychologist, Milicent Shinn.

== Memorials ==
- Edmund Clark Sanford, Nov. 10, 1859, Nov. 22, 1924 in Memoriam

== Works ==
Following list compiled by Edith M. Baker, Assistant Librarian, Clark University.

- Her 'broidery work. Overland Monthly (1883).
- For a plaque. Overland Monthly (1883).
- A belated butterfly. Overland Monthly (1883).
- A pasteboard Cupid. Overland Monthly (1883).
- Fate. Overland Monthly (1883).
- Song. Overland Monthly (1884).
- Poppies and grass-flowers. Overland Monthly (1884).
- Mid-ocean. Overland Monthly (1885).
- Song. Overland Monthly (1885).
- Writings of Laura Bridgman (1887); with an introductory note by G. S. Hall. Reprint from Overland Monthly (1886).
- "Relative legibility of the small letters." The American Journal of Psychology (1888).
- "Personal equation." The American Journal of Psychology (1888, 1889).
- "A simple and inexpensive chronoscope." The American Journal of Psychology (1890).
- "Psychology at Clark University." The American Journal of Psychology (1890).
- Several chapters in A laboratory course in physiological psychology (1891, 1892, 1893, 1895, 1896).
- "Notes on studies of the language of children." The Pedagogical Seminary (1891).
- "Possibility of a realization of four-fold space." Science (1892).
- "A new visual illusion." Science (1893).
- "On reaction-times when the stimulus is applied to the reacting hand." The American Journal of Psychology (1893).
- "A new pendulum chronograph." The American Journal of Psychology (1893).
- "Some practical suggestions on the equipment of a psychological laboratory." The American Journal of Psychology (1893).
- A course in experimental psychology (1894).
- "Notes on new apparatus." The American Journal of Psychology (1895).
- "The Philadelphia meeting of the American Psychological Association." Science (1896).
- "Proceedings of the fourth annual meeting of the American Psychological Association, 1895." The Psychological Review (1896).
- "The vernier chronoscope." The American Journal of Psychology (1898).
- "Studies of rhythm and meter." The American Journal of Psychology (1901).
- "Improvements in the vernier chronoscope." The American Journal of Psychology (1901).
- "Illustrations of the application of psychological principles to ethical problems." The Pedagogical Seminary (1902).
- "Mental growth and decay." The American Journal of Psychology (1902).
- "Psychology and physics." The Psychological Review (1903).
- "The psychic life of fishes." Philosophical Review (1904).
- "On the guessing of numbers." The American Journal of Psychology (1903).
- "Responsiveness to beauty." Clark University Library Publications (1905).
- "A sketch of a beginner's course in psychology." The Pedagogical Seminary (1906).
- "A preliminary report of experiments on time relations in binocular vision." The American Journal of Psychology (1908).
- "The teaching of elementary psychology in colleges and universities with laboratories." The Psychological Monographs (1910).
- "Experimental pedagogy and experimental psychology." Journal of Educational Psychology (1910).
- "The function of the several senses in the mental life." The American Journal of Psychology (1912).
- "Methods of research in education." Journal of Educational Psychology (1912).
- "Psychic research in the animal field: Der kluge Hans and the Elberfeld horses." The American Journal of Psychology (1914).
- "A letter to Dr. Titchener." Studies in psychology contributed by colleagues and former students of Edward Bradford Titchener (1917).
