= Paiute =

Historic map of tribes called "Paiute" overlaid on a map of present-day western US state borders

Paiute (/ˈpaɪjuːt/; also Piute) refers to three non-contiguous groups of Indigenous peoples of the Great Basin. Although their languages are related within the Numic group of Uto-Aztecan languages, these three languages do not form a single subgroup and they are no more closely related to each than they are to the Central Numic languages (Timbisha, Shoshoni, and Comanche) which are spoken between them.

The term "Paiute" does not refer to a single, unique, unified group of Great Basin tribes, but is a historical label comprising:

- Northern Paiute people of northeastern California, northwestern Nevada, eastern Oregon, and southern Idaho
- Southern Paiute people of northern Arizona, southern Nevada, and southwestern Utah
- Mono people of east central California, divided into Owens Valley Paiute (Eastern Mono) and Western Mono (Monache)

== Linguistic differences ==
Though sharing similar Numic roots, the three groups historically called Paiute have different languages as shown below:

- Numic
  - - Western
      - Northern Paiute
      - Mono
    - Southern
      - Kawaiisi
      - Southern Paiute

Tree of Numic languages showing the classification differences between the various groups called "Paiute" with the Western Numic branch of languages containing Mono with its Owens Valley Paiute dialect and Northern Paiute on the left and the Southern Numic branch containing the Colorado River language and its Southern Paiute dialect on the right. Mutually intelligible groups of dialects are grouped together at the bottom of each branch in italics.
