= Lone Pine Paiute-Shoshone Tribe =

Native American Nation

Coordinates: 36°35′49″N 118°03′22″W

The Paiute-Shoshone Indians of the Lone Pine Community of the Lone Pine Reservation (Panamint: Noompai) is a federally recognized tribe of Mono and Timbisha Native American Indians near Lone Pine in Inyo County, California. They are related to the Owens Valley Paiute.

== Language ==
The Lone Pine Paiute-Shoshones traditionally spoke two different languages. The Mono ("Paiutes") spoke the Mono language and the Timbisha ("Shoshones") spoke the Timbisha language, both of which were members of the Numic subgroup of the Uto-Aztecan language family.

== Lone Pine Reservation ==
Location of Lone Pine Reservation

The Paiute-Shoshone Indians of the Lone Pine Community is a federal recognized tribe and reside on the reservation, the Lone Pine Indian Reservation in Inyo County, in central-eastern California, in the Owens River Valley on the eastern side of the Sierra Nevada Mountains. The reservation is 237 acres (0.96 km^{2}) large. Approximately 350 of the 1400 enrolled tribal members live on the reservation. The reservation was established on April 20, 1939, through a land exchange negotiated between the Department of the Interior and the City of Los Angeles. In 1990–1, 168 out of 296 enrolled members lived on reservation. As of the 2010 census the population was 212.

== Government ==
The tribe is governed by a five-person tribal council, who are as follows:

- Melvin R. Joseph – Chairperson
- Mary Wuester – Vice chairperson
- Stacey Mike – Secretary
- Janet Hansen – Treasurer
- Beverly Newell – Trustee

The Lone Pine Indian Community is headquartered in Lone Pine, California. They have their own public works department, environmental department, and tribal administration.

== Education ==
The reservation is served by the Lone Pine Unified School District.

== See also ==
- Mono traditional narratives
- Mono language (California)
- Timbisha language
- Population of Native California
- Population history of American indigenous peoples
- Native Americans in the United States
