= Bishop Paiute Tribe =

Indian tribe in California, United States

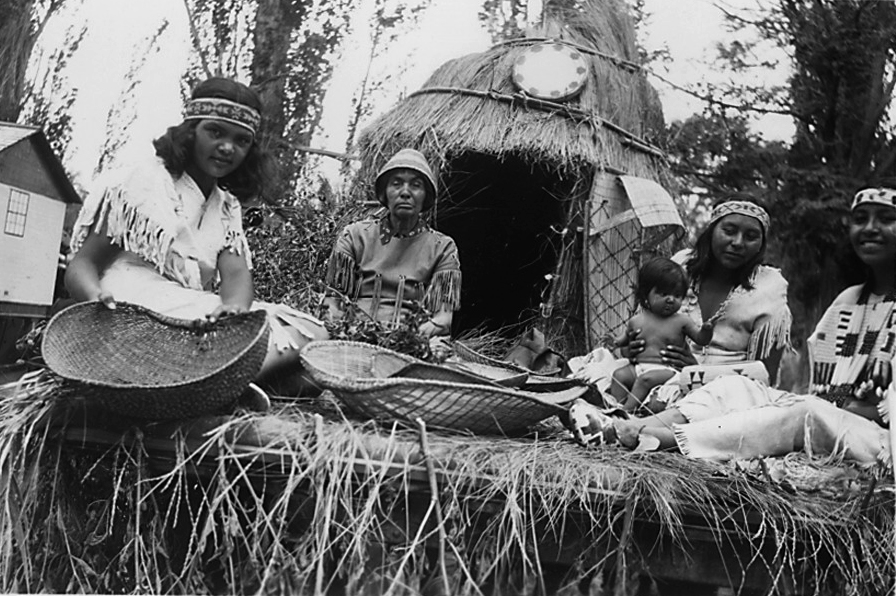
- Bishop Paiute women's Labor Day parade float, 1970

Total population
- 1,914

Regions with significant populations
- United States (California)

Languages
- Mono, Timbisha, English

Related ethnic groups
- other Northern Paiute and Timbisha peoples

The Bishop Paiute Tribe, formerly known as the Paiute-Shoshone Indians of the Bishop Community of the Bishop Colony is a federally recognized tribe of Mono and Timbisha Indians of the Owens Valley, in Inyo County of eastern California. As of 2022, the United States census showed the Bishop Paiute Tribe's population at 1,914.

Awani descendants are also enrolled in the Bishop Paiute Tribe.

== Reservation ==
Location of the Bishop reservation

The Bishop Paiute Tribe has a federal reservation, the Bishop Community of the Bishop Colony (37°21′58″N 118°25′22″W), in the upper Owens Valley, above the city of Bishop, California. The reservation is on the lower slopes and alluvial fan of the Eastern Sierra Nevada Mountains and is 877 acres (3.55 km^{2}) in size. Approximately 1,441 tribal members live on the reservation. The reservation was established in 1912. In 1990, 934 people were enrolled in the federally recognized tribe. The reservation's current boundaries are the result of an Executive Order due to watershed acts during 1932 when President Hoover downsized the size of the grant from 67,000 acres to roughly 900 acres to enable the city of Los Angeles to pipe water from Bishop to Los Angeles County without negotiating a right-of-way with the Paiute.

The Bishop reservation also has their own casino (Wanaaha Casino, formerly known as Paiute Palace Casino), a health care system (Toiyabe Clinic), a student learning center (Barlow Gym), and even a gaming commission.

== Government ==
The tribe is governed by a democratically elected tribal council. The current administration is as follows:

- Council Chairwoman: Meryl Picard
- Vice Chair: Jeff Romero
- Secretary/Treasurer: Steven Orihuela
- Council Member: Mitchell David
- Council Member: Joyce White

The tribal council changes every 2 years. Sometimes there are 3 members who are appointed during odd numbers of the year. It is also co-ed. The tribal council has power to appoint authorities to certain members of the tribe to represent departments like TANF or Public Works. The tribal council has the power to remove members from departments and committees. They also have the power to make ordinances, policies, sanctions, and distribute land to its members.

== Language ==
The Bishop Community traditionally spoke both the Timbisha language and Mono language, both of which are part of the Numic branch of the Uto-Aztecan language family. Timbisha is in the Central Numic and Mono is in the Western Numic divisions.

== Today ==
The tribe's headquarters is located in Bishop, California. The tribe is governed by an elected five-member tribal council. With over 2000 enrolled members, the Bishop Paiute community is the Fifth largest Native American tribe in California. The tribe has its own tribal court and many programs for its members. For economic development, in 1995 the tribe built the Paiute Palace Casino (as of 2020 renovated, expanded and renamed Wanaaha Casino with connected Tu-Kah Novie restaurant, Wanaaha Lounge, and Paiute Deli) in Bishop. The Bishop Paiute Tribe also has a robust rooftop solar installation program, serving hundreds of homes.

== Owens Valley Paiute Shoshone Cultural Center ==
The tribe operates the Owens Valley Paiute Shoshone Cultural Center located in Bishop, California. The center displays art and artifacts from area Paiute and Timbisha tribes and has an active repatriation program through NAGPRA. Their museum store sells contemporary beadwork, basketry, jewelry, quillwork, and educational materials.

== Education ==
The colony is served by the Bishop Union Elementary School District and Bishop Joint Union High School District.

== See also ==
- Mono traditional narratives
- Mono language (California)
- Timbisha language
- Population of Native California
