= Cold Springs Rancheria of Mono Indians of California =

Indian tribe in California, United States

Coordinates: 36°58′18″N 119°19′28″W

Location of Cold Springs Rancheria

The Cold Springs Rancheria of Mono Indians of California is a federally recognized tribe of Mono Native Americans. Cold Springs Rancheria is the tribe's reservation, which is located in Fresno County, California. As of the 2010 census the population was 184.

== Culture ==
The Cold Springs tribe is composed of Western Mono Indians, whose traditional homeland is in the southern Sierra Nevada foothills of California. The Mono language is part of the Uto-Aztecan language family. Acorns are a traditional staple food with great symbolic importance. Their oral history is included in Mono traditional narratives.

== Government ==
They ratified their current tribal constitution on April 11, 1970, and last amended it in 2001. Their Tribal Council is democratically elected and includes a chairperson, vice-chairperson, secretary-treasurer and three council members. Additionally all tribal members 18 years old or older form a voting general council.

== Enrollment ==
Tribal enrollment to the Cold Springs Rancheria is limited to those members listed on the 1960 Plan for Distribution of Assets of the Cold Springs Rancheria roles and their lineal descendants that have a blood quantum of at least one-quarter degree of Californian Indian blood. Approximately 159 to 193 people lived on the Cold Springs Rancheria, and there are 265 to 275 enrolled members of the tribe.

== Reservation ==
The Cold Springs Rancheria occupies 155 acres (0.63 km^{2}) in Sycamore Valley, located 45 miles (72 km) east of Fresno, California. The lands are close to Tollhouse, California, where the tribe is headquartered.

== Mono tribes ==
Other federally recognized Mono tribes are the Tule River Indian Tribe of the Tule River Reservation, the Big Sandy Rancheria of Mono Indians of California, the Northfork Rancheria of Mono Indians of California, Big Pine Band of Owens Valley Paiute Shoshone Indians of the Big Pine Reservation.

== Education ==
The ranchería is served by the Sierra Unified School District.
