= Cascadel, California =

Former settlement in Madera County, California

Coordinates: 37.2329°N 119.4612°W

Cascadel (Mono: hoojowih) is a former settlement in Madera County, California, United States.

It was located in the Sierra Nevada, 4 miles (6.4 km) east of North Fork.

Cascadel was originally the Native American Mono village of Hoojowih. A post office operated at Cascadel from 1892 to 1896.
