= Big Pine Paiute Tribe of the Owens Valley =

Indian tribe in California, United States

Coordinates: 37°09′32″N 118°17′06″W

Numa
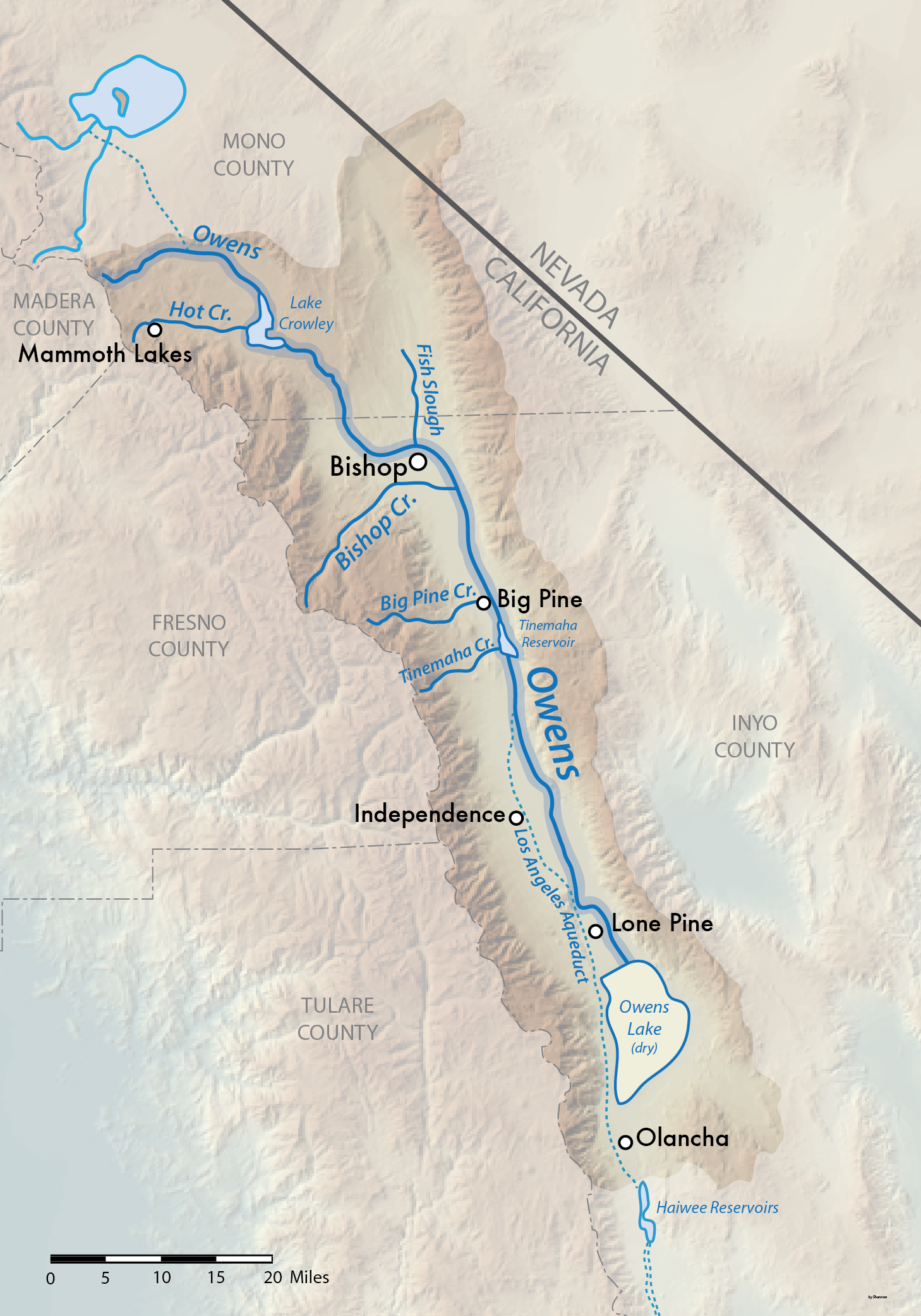
- Map with Big Pine on the Owens River

Total population
- 462 (2024)

Regions with significant populations
- Eastern California, United States

Languages
- English, Mono language

Related ethnic groups
- other Owens Valley Paiutes

The Big Pine Band of Owens Valley Paiute Shoshone Indians of the Big Pine Reservation are a federally recognized tribe of Mono and Timbisha Indians in California.

The Big Pine Reservation is located 18 miles (29 km) from Bishop, at the eastern base of the Sierra Nevada. The tribal headquarters is in Big Pine, California. The tribe has 462 enrolled citizens. As of the 2010 Census the reservation had a population of 499.

== Language ==
The Owen Valley Paiutes historically spoke a dialect of the Mono language, which is part of the Western Numic branch of the Uto-Aztecan language family. While there are extremely few speakers left, the language is still living today. Their name for themselves in their own language is Numa or "People." The so-called Shoshone in the community spoke the Timbisha language, which is part of the Central Numic branch of the Uto-Aztecan language family

== Traditional culture ==
The Owens Valley Paiute were several Paiute groups that cooperated and lived together in semipermanent camps. They mediated between Californian and Great Basin culture. They irrigated crops along the Owens Valley, a highly arable and ecologically diverse region in the southern Sierra Nevada. Their name for themselves was Numa or "People."

The tribe participated in round dances and held annual harvest festivals. Girls had elaborate puberty ceremonies. Mourning was expressed through a ceremony called, "The Cry," which was Yuman in origin and included ritual face washing after a year of mourning. The tribe had both medicine men and women. Hereditary chiefs led the tribe's communal activities. Irrigator was an elected tribal position.

Indian ricegrass and pine nuts were important crops. Hunting supplemented farming, and the tribe hunted rabbits, quail and deer, especially in the summer. The tribe fished for suckers, minnows, and pupfish, as well as brine shrimp. Caterpillar larvae were eaten after being baked and dried. Wild foods were gathered, such as acorns, cattails, and berries.

Popular traditional games include shinny, the four-stick game, hoop and pole, dice games, and handgame, the last of which is still very popular today.

== History ==
In the early 19th century, European-Americans, such as trappers and gold prospectors encountered the Owens Valley Paiute. US military surveyors explored the region in the mid-19th century, planning to establish a reservation for the local Indians. Non-Indians settled in the valley in 1861. Increasing numbers of European-Americans fought with the local tribe for water and farmlands. A military outpost, Camp Independence was built in 1862, and the non-Indians fought with the tribes, destroyed their crops, and were able to seize the best lands.

I have the honor to report to the general commanding the Department of the Pacific that I have been in this valley fifteen days, carrying out my instructions to chastise these Indians, or the Indians of Owens River; that I have killed several, taken eleven prisoners, and destroyed a great many rancherias and a large quantity of seeds, worms, &c., that the Indians had gathered for food.

— GEO. S. EVANS, Lieutenant-Colonel Second Cavalry California Volunteers, Commanding Owens River Expedition, War of the Rebellion: OPERATIONS ON THE PACIFIC COAST. Chapter LXII.

In the early 19th century, the Paiutes numbered 7,500, with about 1,500 to 2,000 Owens Valley Paiutes. In the 1990s an estimated 2,500 Owens Valley Paiutes lived on reservations.

Meanwhile, the Timbisha (Panamint or Death Valley Shoshone) Native Americans relocated from ancestral homelands to be with the Owens Valley Northern Paiute. A reservation was not established until 1912.

In order to provide water needs for the growing City of Los Angeles, water was diverted from the Owens River into the Los Angeles Aqueduct in 1913. The Owens River Valley cultures and environments changed substantially. From the 1910s to 1930s the Los Angeles Department of Water and Power purchased much of the valley for water rights and control, effectively destroying the local economy. In the 1940s the US federal government developed the Indian lands with housing and water systems.

== Big Pine Reservation ==
Location of Big Pine Reservation

The Big Pine Reservation was established in 1912 and is 279 acres (1.13 km^{2}) large, located along US 395 in the high desert town of Big Pine, California. Much of the area houses were built by the Indian Housing Authority. There is a school, with classes from kindergarten to 12th grade adjacent to the reservation. A 1,500-volume public library is located within the school. Tribal members raise horses on the reservation lands.

== Government ==
The Big Pine Band of Owens Valley of Paiute Indians have an elected five Tribal Council that carry out tribal business, oversee financing, provide education, utilities, housing and social services, preserving heritage, and protecting the environment. The listed positions are Cheyenne Stone serving as chairperson, Deanne Cheshire serving as Vice Chairperson, Tawny Williams serving as Member-At-Large, Christina Miller serving as Secretary and Ashlee Dondero serving as Treasurer.

== Environmental department ==
One of many departments the Big Pine Band of Owens Valley of Paiute Indians is the Environmental Department. And its objectives are to maintain an environmental planning program, protect the health and safety of residents and visitors, comply with applicable environmental laws and regulations, and be involved to protect the water, air, and land. The staff of the Environmental Department consists of Sally Manning serving as Environmental Director, Noah Williams serving as Water Program Coordinator, Cynthia Duriscoe serving as Air Program Coordinator, Gregory Spratt serving as Solid Waste Technician, and Joe Miller serving as Community Garden Specialist.

== Big Pine Paiute Development Corporation ==
The Big Pine Paiute Development Corporation (BPPDC) is a corporation chartered by the Big Pine Paiute Tribe of the Owens Valley with a five-member board. The corporation is responsible for the development of the tribal economy to be self-sufficient, business development, tribal employment and improve the quality of life of the Big Pine Band of Owens Valley of Paiute tribe's citizens.

== Education ==
The reservation is served by the Big Pine Unified School District.
