= North Fork Rancheria of Mono Indians of California =

Federally recognized Native American Nation

Coordinates: 37°13′17″N 119°28′28″W

The North Fork Rancheria of Mono Indians of California is a federally recognized tribe of Mono Native Americans. North Fork Rancheria is the name of the tribe's reservation, which is located in Madera County, California. Nium is their self-designation.

== Culture ==
The North Fork Mono tribe are Western Mono Indians, whose traditional homeland is in the southern Sierra Nevada foothills of California. The Mono language is part of the Paiute language family. Their oral history is included in Mono traditional narratives.

Awani descendants are also enrolled in the Northfork Rancheria.

== Enrollment ==
The tribe's 1996 Constitution allows open enrollment to eligible lineal descendants of the Northfork Mono. Their enrollment is 1800, making them one of California's largest native tribes.

== Reservation ==
Location of North Fork Rancheria

The North Fork Rancheria occupies 80 acres (320,000 m^{2}) along the western edge of the Sierra National Forest, about 50 miles (80 km) northeast of Fresno, California. Their tribal headquarters are located in North Fork of Madera County, California.

== Mono tribes ==
Other federally recognized Mono tribes are the Tule River Indian Tribe of the Tule River Reservation, Cold Springs Rancheria of Mono Indians of California, and the Big Sandy Rancheria of Mono Indians of California.

== Education ==
The ranchería is served by the Chawanakee Joint Elementary School District and Sierra High school Joint Union High School District.
