= Fish Springs, California =

Unincorporated community in California, United States

Fish Springs
- Unincorporated community
- Location in California Fish Springs (the United States)
- Coordinates: 37°04′30″N 118°15′13″W
- Country: United States
- State: California
- County: Inyo
- Elevation: 3,900 ft (1,200 m)

Fish Springs (formerly Tinemaha and Tinnemaha) is a set of springs in Inyo County, California, United States.

It is located in the Owens Valley, 6.5 miles (10 km) south-southeast of Big Pine, at an elevation of 3937 feet (1200 m).

A post office operated at Fish Springs during part of 1866, and from 1868 to 1876. A post office operated at Tinnemaha from 1895 to 1910. Tinemaha is the name of a legendary Piute of the region.

The Tinemaha Reservoir, of the Los Angeles Aqueduct system, is located nearby.
