= Keough Hot Springs =

Thermal springs in California

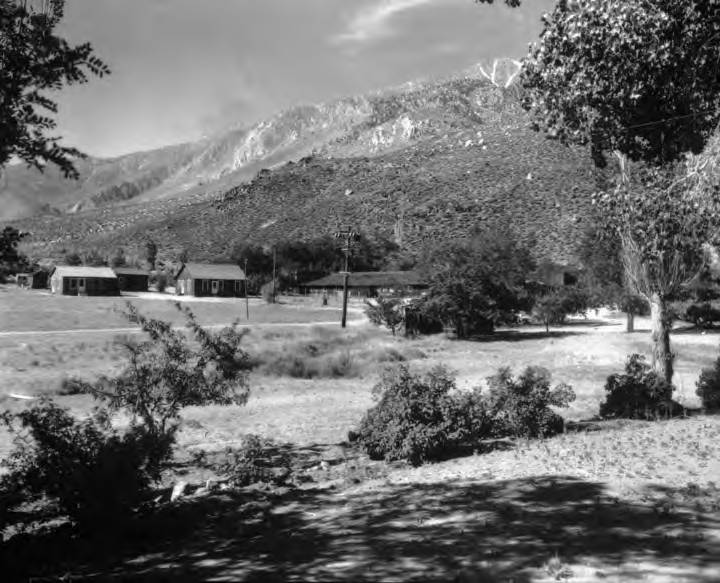
- View from Keough Hot Springs resort looking southwest in Owens Valley (LADWP Historic Photo Collection)

- Location within California
- Interactive map of Keough Hot Springs
- Location: Inyo County, California
- Coordinates: 37.2541°N 118.3765°W
- Elevation: 4,209 feet (1,283 m)

Keough Hot Springs is located in the Owens Valley of California, about seven miles south of the city of Bishop on US Highway 395.

== History ==
The area around these hot springs was originally inhabited by the local native Paiutes, who considered the waters sacred. Today there is a very small community of homes, and a commercial resort featuring a large swimming pool which was built and first opened in August 1918 by Philip P. Keough, a former local superintendent of the Wells Fargo stage company. Keough's resort was very popular in the 1920s and 30's and was designed to be a complete health resort. The resort reportedly continued to be a very popular social gathering site for residents of the nearby communities up until the World War II era.

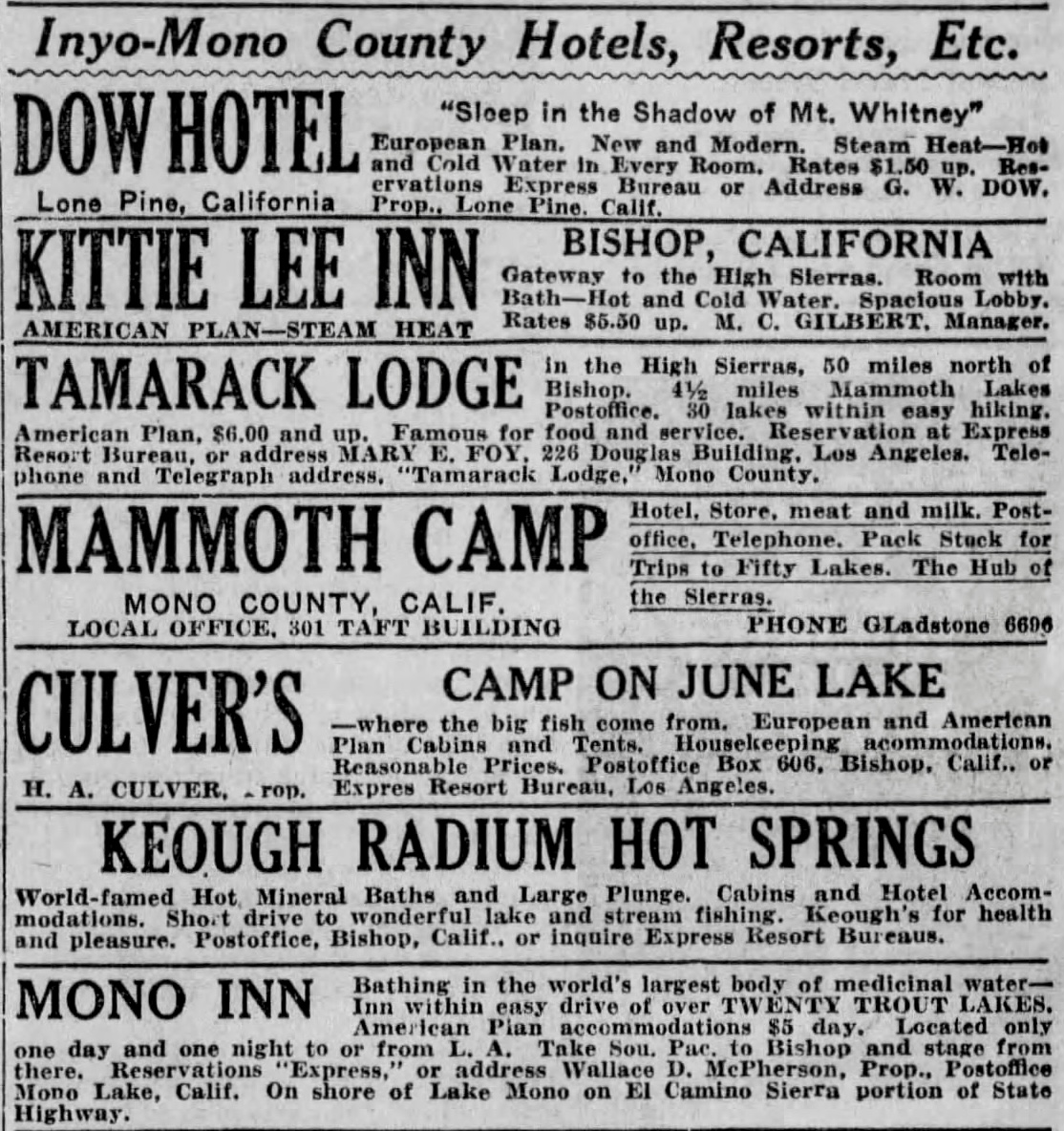
Inyo-Mono County Resorts, Hotels, Etc. (1926)

In 1926 the City of Los Angeles purchased the property as a part of its famous water-rights land grab in the Owens Valley. The City's Water and Power Department allowed the resort to remain open under its direction, but absentee management led to a decline in the resort's viability. Leases were offered to various operators, but with only a five-year term. The pool was closed to the public in 1934, but was reopened a few years later by another operator. A new lessee in 1955 performed renovations and the pool once again regained its vitality as a public swimming and recreation area until insurance considerations dictated that it become a membership-only club in 1985.

== Sources ==
- "Keough's Hot Springs | Bishop California | History". Keoughshotsprings.com. Archived from the original on 2008-05-09.
- Jeff Cook. "Keough Hot Springs, Once Upon A Time" (PDF). Owensvalleyhistory.com. Archived from the original (PDF) on 2015-12-27.
