= Big Pine, California =

Big Pine Tovowahamatü (Mono)
- census-designated place
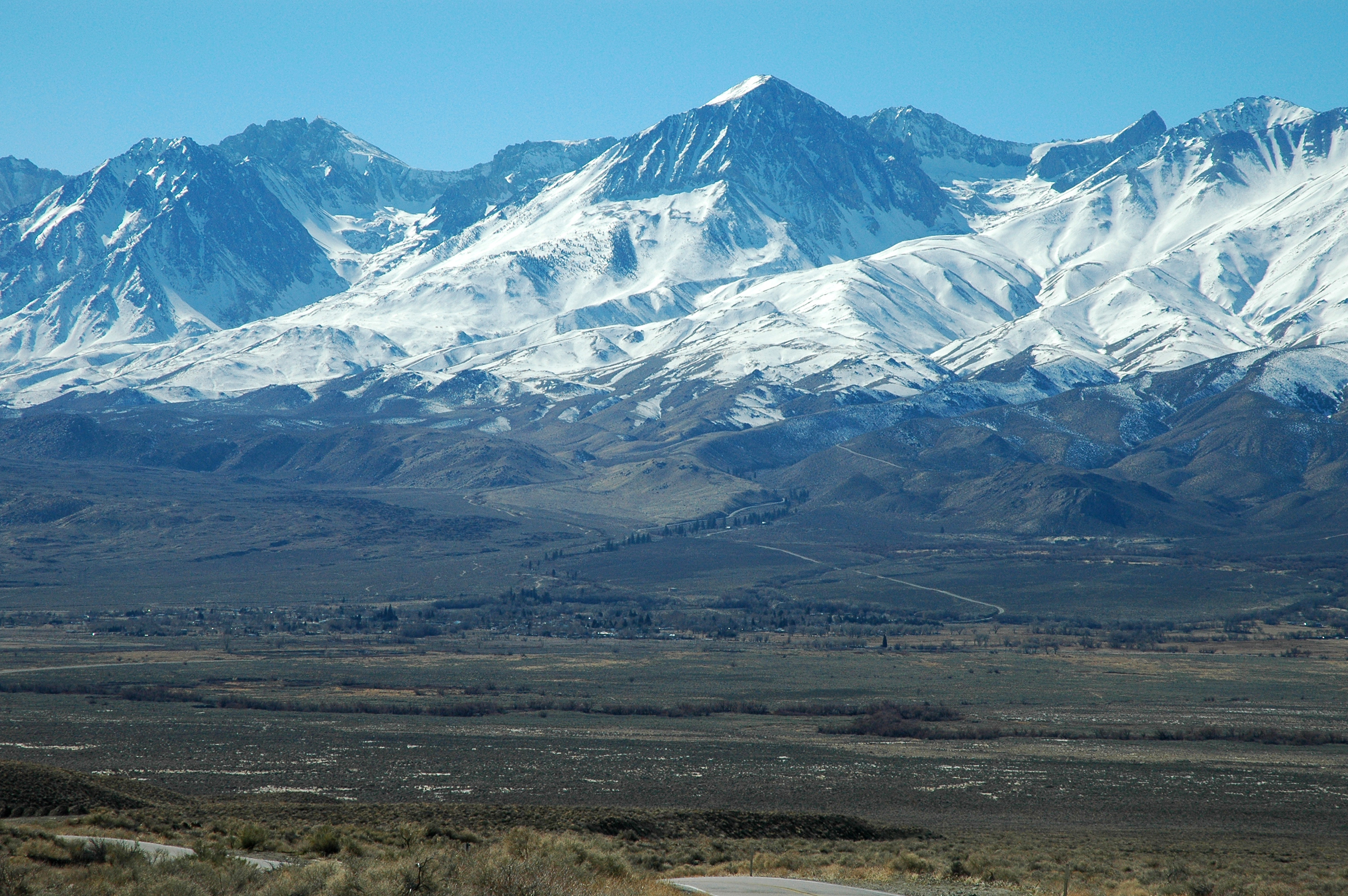
- Big Pine in the Owens Valley, Sierra Nevada behind

- Location in Inyo County and the state of California

- Location in California
- Coordinates: 37°09′56″N 118°17′43″W
- Country: United States
- State: California
- County: Inyo
- Named for: A large pine tree that had been growing in the town in 1870

Area
  - Total: 2.95 sq mi (7.64 km^{2})
  - Land: 2.95 sq mi (7.64 km^{2})
  - Water: 0 sq mi (0.00 km^{2}) 0.065%
- Elevation: 4,019 ft (1,225 m)

Population (2020)
  - Total: 1,875
  - Density: 635.9/sq mi (245.53/km^{2})
- Time zone: UTC−08:00 (PST)
  - Summer (DST): UTC−07:00 (PDT)
- ZIP code: 93513
- Area codes: 442/760
- FIPS code: 06-06616
- GNIS feature ID: 2407843

Big Pine (formerly Bigpine, Mono: Tovowahamatü) is a census-designated place (CDP) in Inyo County, California, United States. Big Pine is located approximately 15 miles (24 km) south-southeast of Bishop. Its population was 1,875 at the 2020 census, up from 1,756 at the 2010 census. The Big Pine Band of Owens Valley Paiute Shoshone Indians of the Big Pine Reservation bases their tribal headquarters here.

== Geography ==
Big Pine is located in the Owens Valley of California between the Sierra Nevada and the White Mountains, just west of the Owens River and upstream of its diversion into the Los Angeles Aqueduct. It lies on U.S. Route 395, the main north–south artery through the Owens Valley, connecting the Inland Empire to Reno, Nevada. US 395 also connects Big Pine to Los Angeles via State Route 14 through Palmdale.

To the East, CA route 168 crosses the White Mountains over Westgard Pass to the basin and range province of Nevada, while Death Valley Road leads to Death Valley. The plaque beneath the young giant sequoia (pictured), referred to as the Roosevelt Pine, at the road junction says it was planted in 1913 to commemorate the opening of Westgaard Pass to auto traffic. The landmark giant sequoia was felled on September 28, 2020, after most of its foliage had died following its sole water source drying up during the 2017-18 drought. North from Westgaard Pass lies the Ancient Bristlecone Pine Forest, home to the oldest trees in the world.

To the west, Glacier Lodge Road leads high up Big Pine Creek into the Sierra, to lakes, hiking trails, fishing, and rock climbing underneath the Palisades Range and the Palisade Glacier.

According to the United States Census Bureau, the CDP has a total area of 3.0 square miles (7.8 km^{2}), over 99% of which is land.

== History ==
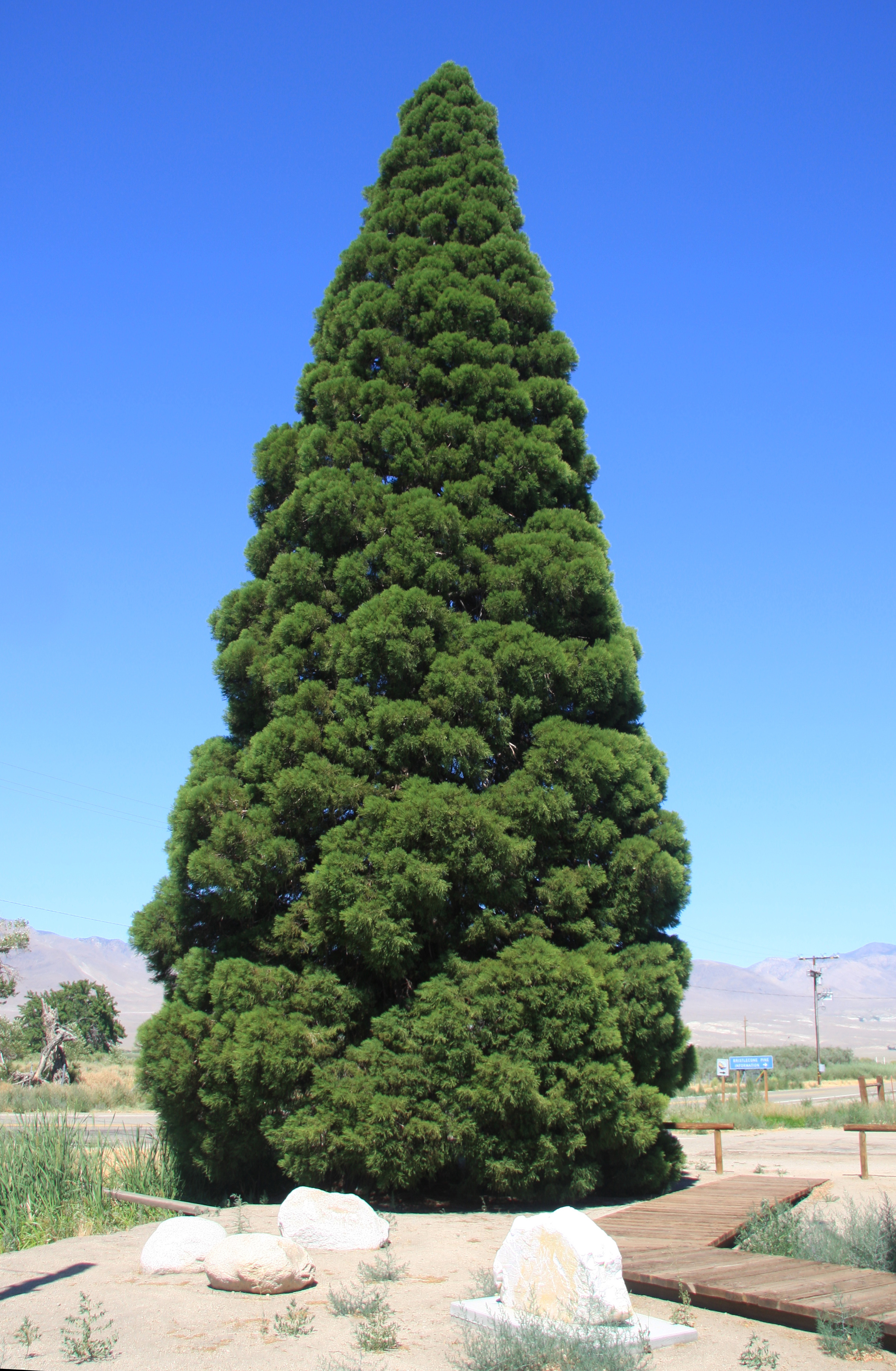
The Roosevelt Tree of Big Pine before it was removed in 2020 due to its declining health and the lack of adequate water. Despite common misconception, Big Pine was not named for this giant sequoia, but a different, long forgotten pine tree

The Big Pine post office first opened in 1870, closed for a time during 1877, changed its name to Bigpine in 1895, and reverted to Big Pine in 1962.

Big Pine has a significant geologic feature (an earthquake scarp) related to the 1872 Lone Pine earthquake.

In 1958, the Owens Valley Radio Observatory was established just north of Big Pine.

Matt Williams, a professional baseball player and manager, lived there for part of his life. Hollywood character actor Elisha Cook, Jr., known for such classic films as The Maltese Falcon and Shane, had a home in Big Pine and died there in 1995.

== Demographics ==
Historical population
Census	Pop.	Note	%±
1980	1,510		—
1990	1,158		−23.3%
2000	1,350		16.6%
2010	1,756		30.1%
2020	1,875		6.8%
U.S. Decennial Census; 1860–1870 1880-1890; 1900 1910 1920; 1930 1940 1950; 1960 1970 1980; 1990 2000 2010; 2020

Big Pine first appeared as a census designated place in the 1980 U.S. census.

=== Racial and ethnic composition ===
Big Pine CDP, California – Racial and ethnic composition Note: the US Census treats Hispanic/Latino as an ethnic category. This table excludes Latinos from the racial categories and assigns them to a separate category. Hispanics/Latinos may be of any race.
Race / Ethnicity (NH = Non-Hispanic)	Pop 2000	Pop 2010	Pop 2020	% 2000	% 2010	% 2020
White alone (NH)	1,115	1,106	1,008	82.59%	62.98%	53.76%
Black or African American alone (NH)	2	3	2	0.15%	0.17%	0.11%
Native American or Alaska Native alone (NH)	54	412	439	4.00%	23.46%	23.41%
Asian alone (NH)	8	13	21	0.59%	0.74%	1.12%
Native Hawaiian or Pacific Islander alone (NH)	0	1	2	0.00%	0.06%	0.11%
Other race alone (NH)	2	0	7	0.15%	0.00%	0.37%
Mixed race or Multiracial (NH)	61	39	79	4.52%	2.22%	4.21%
Hispanic or Latino (any race)	108	182	317	8.00%	10.36%	16.91%
Total	1,350	1,756	1,875	100.00%	100.00%	100.00%

=== 2020 census ===
As of the 2020 census, Big Pine had a population of 1,875. The population density was 635.8 inhabitants per square mile (245.5/km^{2}). The whole population lived in households.

The median age was 41.6 years. The age distribution was 23.3% under the age of 18, 5.7% aged 18 to 24, 25.5% aged 25 to 44, 24.1% aged 45 to 64, and 21.3% who were 65 years of age or older. For every 100 females, there were 99.0 males, and for every 100 females age 18 and over there were 95.9 males age 18 and over. 0.0% of residents lived in urban areas, while 100.0% lived in rural areas.

There were 770 households, out of which 27.1% had children under the age of 18, 44.2% were married-couple households, 6.1% were cohabiting couple households, 28.2% had a female householder with no spouse or partner present, and 21.6% had a male householder with no spouse or partner present. 29.7% of households were one person, and 15.5% were one person aged 65 or older. The average household size was 2.44. There were 499 families (64.8% of all households).

There were 872 housing units at an average density of 295.7 units per square mile (114.2 units/km^{2}), of which 770 (88.3%) were occupied. Of these, 76.6% were owner-occupied, and 23.4% were occupied by renters. 11.7% of housing units were vacant. The homeowner vacancy rate was 0.7% and the rental vacancy rate was 6.7%.

=== Income and poverty ===
In 2023, the US Census Bureau estimated that the median household income was $52,647, and the per capita income was $41,505. About 8.1% of families and 11.4% of the population were below the poverty line.

=== 2010 census ===
The 2010 United States census reported that Big Pine had a population of 1,756. The population density was 594.0 inhabitants per square mile (229.3/km^{2}). The racial makeup of Big Pine was 1,192 (67.9%) White, 3 (0.2%) African American, 438 (24.9%) Native American, 13 (0.7%) Asian, 1 (0.1%) Pacific Islander, 52 (3.0%) from other races, and 57 (3.2%) from two or more races. Hispanic or Latino of any race were 182 persons (10.4%).

The Census reported that 1,756 people (100% of the population) lived in households, 0 (0%) lived in non-institutionalized group quarters, and 0 (0%) were institutionalized.

There were 764 households, out of which 184 (24.1%) had children under the age of 18 living in them, 360 (47.1%) were opposite-sex married couples living together, 100 (13.1%) had a female householder with no husband present, 37 (4.8%) had a male householder with no wife present. There were 49 (6.4%) unmarried opposite-sex partnerships, and 7 (0.9%) same-sex married couples or partnerships. 219 households (28.7%) were made up of individuals, and 100 (13.1%) had someone living alone who was 65 years of age or older. The average household size was 2.30. There were 497 families (65.1% of all households); the average family size was 2.78.

The population was spread out, with 341 people (19.4%) under the age of 18, 118 people (6.7%) aged 18 to 24, 381 people (21.7%) aged 25 to 44, 571 people (32.5%) aged 45 to 64, and 345 people (19.6%) who were 65 years of age or older. The median age was 46.6 years. For every 100 females, there were 97.1 males. For every 100 females age 18 and over, there were 92.3 males.

There were 871 housing units at an average density of 294.7 per square mile (113.8/km^{2}), of which 764 were occupied, of which 586 (76.7%) were owner-occupied, and 178 (23.3%) were occupied by renters. The homeowner vacancy rate was 1.5%; the rental vacancy rate was 6.3%. 1,357 people (77.3% of the population) lived in owner-occupied housing units and 399 people (22.7%) lived in rental housing units.

== Education ==
Big Pine students are served by Big Pine Unified School District, which features an elementary school, middle school, high school and a continuation high school. The Big Pine high school mascot is the Warrior.

== Representation ==
In the state legislature, Big Pine is in the 4th senatorial district, represented by Republican Marie Alvarado-Gil, and the 8th Assembly district, represented by Republican David Tangipa.

Federally, Big Pine is in California's 3rd congressional district, represented by Independent Kevin Kiley.

== Piper v. Big Pine (1924) 193 Cal. 664 ==
In 1923, Alice Piper, a 15-year-old Native American living in Big Pine, wanted to attend Big Pine school, but was denied on grounds of her ethnicity. Piper, the daughter of Pike and Annie Piper, sued the school district, claiming the state law establishing separate schools for “Indian children” and other children of Asian parentage was unconstitutional.

The State Supreme Court ruled unanimously that because Alice Piper's father was a tax-paying citizen, that Alice Piper therefore qualified as a citizen under the Dawes Act. The court did not, in fact, find that her 14th Amendment rights had been violated. Nonetheless, Alice Piper was invited as a pupil and her victory along with the passage the Indian Citizenship Act, on the same day opened the door for her and other Native American children to attend public schools in the state of California. Because of this, the Big Pine School District is memorialized as a major player in the constitutional battle over the rights of Native Americans to attend public schools segregated for “whites only.”

The Piper case has become a landmark case and is viewed as the legal authority guaranteeing Native American children the right to attend public schools. It has been used as precedent in other cases such as Brown v. Board of Education.

== In Media ==
The song "Relax, Enjoy Yourself" from the 1995 album/stage production Randy Newman's Faust mentions Big Pine.

== See also ==
- Big Pine volcanic field
