= Timbisha language =

Endangered Uto-Aztecan language of California

Timbisha
- Panamint
- Nümü nangkawih, Sosoni nangkawih
- Native to: United States
- Region: California, Nevada
- Ethnicity: 100 Timbisha (1998)
- Native speakers: 20 (2007)
- Language family: Uto-Aztecan: Numic; Central Numic; Timbisha
- Dialects: Central; Eastern; Western

Language codes
- ISO 639-3: par
- Glottolog: pana1305
- ELP: Panamint
- Panamint is classified as Critically Endangered by the UNESCO Atlas of the World's Languages in Danger.

Timbisha (tümpisa) "Rock Paint"
- Person: Nümü
- People: Nümü Tümpisattsi
- Language: Nümü Nangkawih
- Country: Tupippuh Nümü

Timbisha (Tümpisa) or Panamint (also called Koso) is the language of the Native American people who have inhabited the region in and around Death Valley, California, and the southern Owens Valley since late prehistoric times. There are a few elderly individuals who can speak the language in California and Nevada, but none are monolingual, and all use English regularly in their daily lives. Until the late 20th century, the people called themselves and their language "Shoshone." The tribe then achieved federal recognition under the name Death Valley Timbisha Shoshone Band of California. This is an Anglicized spelling of the native name of Death Valley, tümpisa, pronounced [tɨmbiʃa], which means "rock paint" and refers to the rich sources of red ochre in the valley. Timbisha is also the language of the so-called "Shoshone" groups at Bishop, Big Pine, Darwin, Independence, and Lone Pine communities in California and the Beatty community in Nevada. It was also the language spoken at the former Indian Ranch reservation in Panamint Valley.

== Classification ==
Timbisha is one of the Central Numic languages of the Numic branch of Uto-Aztecan. It is most closely related to Shoshoni and Comanche.

== Geographic distribution ==
Timbisha was formerly spoken in the region between the Sierra Nevada mountains of eastern California and the region just to the east of Death Valley in Nevada. Principal valleys where villages were located were (from west to east) Owens Valley, Indian Wells Valley, Saline Valley, Panamint Valley, and Death Valley. In addition, there were villages along the southern slopes of the Kawich Range in Nevada.

=== Dialects ===
Each valley had its own variety of Timbisha with mostly lexical differences between them. There was, however, a general loss of h as one moved west across Timbisha territory with h virtually gone in Owens Valley varieties. McLaughlin's grammar is based on the far eastern variety from Beatty, Nevada, while Dayley's is based on a central variety from Death Valley.

== Phonology ==
=== Vowels ===
Timbisha also has a typical Numic vowel inventory of five vowels. In addition, there is the common diphthong ai, which varies rather freely with e, although certain morphemes always contain ai and others always contain e. (The official orthography is shown in parentheses.)

	front	central	back
High	i	ɨ ⟨ü⟩	u
Non-High		a	o
Diphthong	ai ⟨ai, e⟩		

=== Consonants ===
Timbisha has a typical Numic consonant inventory. (The official orthography is shown in parentheses.):

	Bilabial	Coronal	Palatal	Velar		Glottal
	Bilabial	Coronal	Palatal	plain	labial.	Glottal
Nasal	m	n		ŋ ⟨ng⟩	ŋʷ ⟨ngw⟩	
Plosive	p	t		k	kʷ	ʔ
Affricate		ts				
Fricative		s				h
Semivowel			j ⟨y⟩		w	

=== Phonotactics ===
Timbisha stops (including the affricate) and nasals are voiced and lenited between vowels, are voiced in nasal-stop clusters, and are lenited (but not voiced) following h.

Voiceless vowels are less common in Timbisha than in Shoshoni and Comanche.

== Writing system ==
Timbisha spelling is based on Dayley and uses the Roman alphabet. Ü is used for ɨ and ng for ŋ.

== Grammar ==
Study of Timbisha has been carried on by Jon Dayley and John McLaughlin, both of whom wrote grammatical descriptions. Dayley has published a dictionary.

=== Word order and case marking ===
Timbisha word order is usually SOV as in:

taipo kinni'a punittai
white-man falcon saw
"The white man saw a falcon"

The accusative case and possessive case are marked with suffixes. Adverbial relationships are marked with postpositions on nouns as well as with true adverbs. For example:

kahni-pa'a
house-on
"on the house"

Adjectives are usually prefixed to the nouns they modify, unless the relationship is temporary when they are independent words with special suffixes. Compare tosa-kapayu, 'white-horse', "palomino or other pale-colored breed" and tosapihtü kapayu, 'white/pale horse', "white or pale horse" (who happens to be white or pale, but whose siblings may be any color).

=== Verbs ===
Verbs are marked for grammatical aspect with suffixes. Valence is marked with both prefixes and suffixes. Some common intransitive verbs have suppletive forms for singular or plural subjects and some common transitive verbs have suppletive forms for singular or plural objects. Otherwise, there is no grammatical agreement marked by the verb.
