= Shoshoni language =

Uto-Aztecan language spoken in western US

Shoshoni
- Sosoni' ta̲i̲kwappe, Neme ta̲i̲kwappeh
- Native to: United States
- Region: Wyoming, Utah, Nevada, Idaho
- Ethnicity: Shoshones
- Native speakers: ~1,000 (2007); 1,000 additional non-fluent speakers (2007)
- Language family: Uto-Aztecan: Northern; Numic; Central; Shoshoni
- Early form: Proto-Numic
- Dialects: Western Shoshoni; Northern Shoshoni; Gosiute; Eastern Shoshoni
- Writing system: Latin

Language codes
- ISO 639-3: shh
- Glottolog: shos1248
- ELP: Shoshone
- Map of the Shoshoni (and Timbisha) languages prior to European contact

- Shoshoni is classified as Severely Endangered by the UNESCO Atlas of the World's Languages in Danger.

Neme / Newe "People"
- People: Neme; Newe
- Language: Neme Ta̲i̲kwappeh; Newe Ta̲i̲kwappe
- Country: Neme Segobia; Newe Segobia

Shoshoni, also written as Shoshoni-Gosiute and Shoshone (/ʃoʊˈʃoʊni/, shoh-SHOH-nee; Shoshoni orthography: Sosoni' ta̲i̲kwappe, newe ta̲i̲kwappe or neme ta̲i̲kwappeh), is a Uto-Aztecan language from the Numic branch spoken in the Western United States by the Shoshone. Shoshoni is primarily spoken in the Great Basin in areas of Wyoming, Utah, Nevada, and Idaho.

The phonemes of Shoshoni are few, but a wide range of allophones appear in the spoken language. The language has six vowels distinctions (including one that is underlyingly a diphthong), which are each also distinguished by length. Shoshoni is strongly suffixing, inflecting nouns for number and case, and distinguishes verbs for aspect and tense. Word order is relatively free, but shows a preference toward subject–object–verb word order.

The endonyms newe ta̲i̲kwappe and Sosoni' ta̲i̲kwappe mean "the people's language" and "the Shoshoni language", respectively. Shoshoni is classified as threatened, although attempts at language revitalization are underway.

== Classification and dialects ==
Shoshoni is the northernmost member of the large Uto-Aztecan language family, with the Northern Shoshone living in the Snake River plain of southern Idaho. This family includes nearly sixty living languages, which are spoken in Western United States, are centered in Mexico, and have branches in El Salvador in the very northernmost part of South America. The homeland of its common ancestor was likely Aridoamerica, which includes parts of northern Mexico and the Southwestern United States.

Shoshoni belongs to the Numic subbranch of Uto-Aztecan, which is associated with the historical Aridoamerica cultural region. The term Numic derives from cognates in all Numic languages denoting "person". For example, in Shoshoni the word is neme [nɨw̃ɨ] or, depending on the dialect, newe [nɨwɨ], in Timbisha it is nümü [nɨwɨ], and in Southern Paiute, nuwuvi [nuwuβi].

Shoshoni's closest relatives are the Central Numic languages Timbisha and Comanche. Timbisha, or Panamint, is spoken in southeastern California near Death Valley by members of the Timbisha, but it is considered a distinct language from Shoshoni. The Comanche split from the Shoshone around 1700, and consonant changes over the past few centuries have limited the mutual intelligibility of Comanche and Shoshoni.

Principal dialects of Shoshoni are Western Shoshoni in Nevada, Gosiute in western Utah, Northern Shoshoni in southern Idaho and northern Utah, and Eastern Shoshoni in Wyoming. The main differences between these dialects are phonological.

== Status ==
The number of people who speak Shoshoni has been steadily dwindling since the late 20th century. In the early 21st century, fluent speakers number only several hundred to a few thousand people, while an additional population of about 1,000 know the language to some degree but are not fluent. The Duck Valley and Gosiute communities have established programs to teach the language to their children. Ethnologue lists Shoshoni as "threatened" as it notes that many of the speakers are 50 and older. UNESCO has classified the Shoshoni language as "severely endangered" in Idaho, Utah, and Wyoming. The language is still being taught to children in a small number of isolated locations. The tribes have a strong interest in language revitalization, but efforts to preserve the language are scattered, with little coordination. However, literacy in Shoshoni is increasing. Shoshoni dictionaries have been published and portions of the Bible were translated in 1986.

As of 2012, Idaho State University offers elementary, intermediate, and conversational Shoshoni language classes, in a 20-year project to preserve the language. Open-source Shosoni audio is available online to complement classroom instruction, as part of the university's long-standing Shoshoni Language Project.

The Shoshone-Bannock Tribe teaches Shoshoni to its children and adults as part of its Language and Culture Preservation Program. On the Wind River Reservation in Wyoming, elders have been active in digital language archiving. Shoshoni is taught using Dr. Steven Greymorning's Accelerated Second Language Acquisition techniques.

A summer program known as the Shoshone/Goshute Youth Language Apprenticeship Program (SYLAP), held at the University of Utah's Center for American Indian Languages since 2009, has been featured on NPR's Weekend Edition. Shoshoni youth serve as interns, assisting with digitization of Shoshoni language recordings and documentation from the Wick R. Miller collection, in order to make the materials available for tribal members. The program released the first Shoshone language video game in August 2013.

In July 2012, Blackfoot High School in Southeastern Idaho announced it would offer Shoshoni language classes. The Chief Tahgee Elementary Academy, a Shoshone-Bannock charter school teaching English and Shoshoni, opened at Fort Hall in 2013.

== Phonology ==
=== Vowels ===
Shoshoni has a typical Numic vowel inventory of five vowels. In addition, there is the common diphthong /ai/, which functions as a simple vowel and varies rather freely with [e]; however, certain morphemes always contain [ai] and others always contain [e]. All vowels occur as short or long, but [aiː]/[eː] is rare.

		Front	Back	
		Front	unrounded	rounded
High	short	i	ɨ	u
High	long	iː	ɨː	uː
Mid	short	ai		o
Mid	long	aiː		oː
Low	short		a	
Low	long		aː	

=== Consonants ===
Shoshoni has a typical Numic consonant inventory.

	Bilabial	Coronal	Palatal	Velar		Glottal
	Bilabial	Coronal	Palatal	plain	lab.	Glottal
Nasal	m	n				
Stop	p	t		k	kʷ	ʔ
Affricate		t͡s				
Fricative		s				h
Semivowel			j		w	

=== Syllable structure ===
Shoshoni syllables are of the form (C)V(V)(C). For instance: nɨkka "dance" (CVC CV), ɨkkoi "sleep" (VC CVV), and paa "water" (CVV). Shoshoni does not allow onset clusters.

Typical Shoshoni roots are of the form CV(V)CV(V). Examples include kasa "wing" and papi "older brother".

=== Stress ===
Stress in Shoshoni is regular but not distinctive. Primary stress usually falls on the first syllable (more specifically, the first mora) of a word; however, primary stress tends to fall on the second syllable if that syllable is long. For instance, natsattamahkantɨn [ˈnazattamaxandɨ] "tied up" bears primary stress on the first syllable; however, kottoohkwa [kotˈtoːxˌwa] "made a fire" bears primary stress on the second syllable, with long vowel [oː], instead of the first syllable with short vowel [o].

As in other Numic languages, stress in Shoshoni is distributed based on mora-counting. Short Shoshoni vowels have one mora, while long vowels and vowel clusters ending in [a] have two morae. Following the primary stress, every other mora receives secondary stress. If stress falls on the second mora in a long vowel, the stress is transferred to the first mora in the long vowel and mora counting continues from there. For example, natsattamahkantɨn "tied up" bears the stress pattern [ˈnazatˌtamaˌxandɨ], with stress falling on every other mora.

With some dialectical variation, mora counting resets at the border between stems in compound words. Final syllables need not be stressed and may undergo optional final vowel devoicing.

=== Phonological processes ===
Given here are a few examples of regular, well-documented phonological rules in Shoshoni:

- Short, unclustered, unstressed vowels, when part of final syllables and followed by /h/, are devoiced. These same vowels, when preceded by /h/, are usually devoiced. These processes represent Shoshoni "organic devoicing". For instance, tɨkkahkwan → [tɨkkḁxwa] "ate up".
- Final vowels may be devoiced optionally, representing Shoshoni "inorganic devoicing". If the final vowel is devoiced, the long or short consonant preceding it is also devoiced. Thus, kammu → [kamm̥u̥] "jackrabbit".
- Stops, affricates, and nasals are voiced and lenited between vowels. The stops and affricate become voiced fricatives; the nasals become nasalized glides. Thus papi → [paβi] "brother", tatsa → [taza ~ tad͡za] "summer", and imaa → [iw̃aː] "tomorrow".
- Stops, affricates, and nasals are lenited, but remain unvoiced, when they are preceded by underlying /h/. This /h/ is deleted in the surface form. Thus, paikkahkwa → [pekkḁxwa] "killed".
- Stops, affricates, and nasals are voiced when part of an intervocalic nasal cluster. Thus, pampi → [pambi] "head" and wantsi → [wand͡zi] "antelope".

== Morphology ==
Shoshoni is a synthetic, agglutinative language, in which words, especially verbs, tend to be complex with several morphemes strung together. Shoshoni is a primarily suffixing language.

=== Nouns ===
==== Absolutive suffixes ====
Many nouns in Shoshoni have an absolutive suffix (unrelated to the absolutive case). The absolutive suffix is normally dropped when the noun is the first element in a compound, when the noun is followed by a suffix or postposition, or when the noun is incorporated into a verb. For instance, the independent noun sɨhɨpin "willow" has the absolutive suffix -pin; the root loses this suffix in the form sɨhɨykwi "to gather willows". The correlation between any particular noun stem and which of the seven absolutive suffixes it has is irregular and unpredictable. The absolutive suffixes are as follows:

- -pin
- -ppɨh
- -ppɨ
- -pittsih, -pittsɨh
- -mpih
- -pai
- -ttsih

==== Number and case ====
Shoshoni is a nominative-accusative language. Shoshoni nouns inflect for three cases (subjective, objective, and possessive) and for three numbers (singular, dual, and plural).

Number is marked by suffixes on all human nouns and optionally on other animate nouns. The regular suffixes for number are listed in the table below. The Shoshoni singular is unmarked.

		Number		
		Singular	Dual	Plural
Case	Subjective	Ø	-nɨwɨh	-nɨɨn
Case	Objective	Ø	-nihi	-nii
Case	Possessive	Ø	-nɨhɨn	-nɨɨn

Case is also marked by suffixes, which vary depending on the noun. Subjective case is unmarked. Many nouns also have a zero objective case marker; other possible objective markers are -tta, -a, and -i. These suffixes correspond with the possessive case markers -n, -ttan or -n, -an, or -n (in Western Shoshoni; this last suffix also appears as -an in Gosiute and is replaced by -in in Northern Shoshoni). These case markers can be predicted only to a degree based on phonology of the noun stem.

==== Derivational morphology ====
Nominal derivational morphology is also often achieved through suffixing. For instance, the instrumental suffix -(n)nompɨh is used with verb stems to form nouns used for the purpose of the verb: katɨnnompɨh "chair" is derived from katɨ "sit"; puinompɨh "binoculars" is derived from pui "see". The characterization suffix -kantɨn be used with a root noun to derive a noun characterized by the root: hupiakantɨn "singer" is derived from hupia "song"; puhakantɨn "shaman" is derived from puha "power", as one characterized by power.

=== Verbs ===
==== Number ====
Shoshoni verbs may mark for number, mainly through reduplication or suppletion. The dual is commonly marked through reduplication of the first syllable of the verb stem, so that singular kimma "come" becomes kikimma in the dual (and remains kima in the plural). A suppletive form is often used for the dual or plural forms of the verb; for instance, singular yaa "carry" becomes hima in both the dual and plural. Suppletion and reduplication frequently work in tandem to express number: singular nukki "run" becomes the reduplicated nunukki in the dual and the suppleted nutaa in the plural; singular yɨtsɨ "fly" is reduplicated, suppleted dual yoyoti and suppleted plural yoti.

==== Instrumental prefixes ====
Shoshoni uses prefixes to add a specific instrumental element to a verb. For instance, the instrumental prefix to- '"with the hand or fist" can be used with the verb tsima "scrape" to yield tottsima "wipe", as in pɨn puihkatti tottsimma yakaitɨn "he wiped at his eyes, crying".

Common instrumental prefixes include:

- kɨ- "with the teeth or mouth"
- ku- "by heat"
- ma- "with a non-grasping hand"
- mu- "with the nose or front of body"
- ni- "with the voice"
- pi- "with the buttocks or back of body"
- sɨ- "by cold"
- sun- "with the mind"
- ta- "with the feet"
- ta- "with a hard instrument or rock"
- to- "with the hand or fist"
- tsa- "with a grasping hand"
- tsi- "with a sharp point"
- tso- "with the head"
- wɨ- "with a long instrument or body"; generic instrumental

== Syntax ==
=== Word order ===
Subject-object-verb (SOV) is the typical word order for Shoshoni.

nɨ hunanna puinnu
I badger see
"I saw a badger"

nɨwɨ sakkuhtɨn paittsɨkkinna
person there {was hollering}
"the person was making a fuss there"

In ditransitive sentences, the direct and indirect object are marked with the objective case. The indirect object can occur before the direct object, or vice versa. For example, in nɨ tsuhnippɨha satiia uttuhkwa "I gave the bone to the dog", tsuhnippɨh "bone" and satii "dog" take the objective case suffix -a.

The subject is not a mandatory component of a grammatical Shoshoni sentence. Therefore, impersonal sentences without subjects are allowed; those sentences have an object-verb word order.

ɨtɨinna
hot-CONT
"it [the weather] is hot"

In particular, it is common for the subject to be deleted when a coreferential pronoun appears elsewhere in the sentence. For example, pɨnnan haintsɨha kai paikkawaihtɨn "he won't kill his (own) friend" uses the coreferential possessive pronoun pɨnnan and lacks a word for "he" as an explicit subject. Likewise, the subject can be deleted from the sentence when the subject can be inferred from context. For example, in a narrative about one man who shoots another, u paikkahkwa "he killed him" (literally, "him killed") is acceptable, because the killer is clear from the context of the narrative.

State-of-being sentences express “be” by excluding an overt verb, resulting in a basic subject-object order.

usɨ um pii
that his mother
"that is his mother"

Sentence meaning is not dependent on word order in Shoshoni. For example, if the subject is an unstressed pronoun then it is grammatical for the subject to follow the object of the sentence.

==== Constituent order ====
The basic order of constituent morphemes in Shoshoni verbs is as follows:

(Valence) - (Instrumental) - Stem - (Causative/Benefactive) - (Secondary Verb) - (Directional) - (Prefinal Aspect) - (Aspect) - (Imperative) - (Number) - (Subordination)

Any verb form must include a verb stem, but other prefixes and suffixes may not be present, depending on the particular verb form.

=== Subordination ===
==== Relative clauses ====
Relative clauses tend to share the same head noun as the main clause, and the case of this noun must agree in both clauses. When the subject of the relative clause matches the subject of the main clause, the verb of the relative clause takes on the same-subject subordination suffix -tɨn or -h/kkantɨn, depending on whether the events of the clauses occur simultaneously or not. These suffixes agree with the head noun of the main clause in both case and number. For example, wa'ippɨ yakaitɨn pitɨnuh "the woman who was crying arrived", where the subject wa'ippɨ "woman" is the same for both clauses and yakai- "cry" in the relative clause takes the suffix -tɨn.

However, when the subject of the relative clause is not the head noun of the main clause, the subject of the relative clause takes the possessive case and a different set of verbal suffixes are used; the head noun may be deleted from the relative clause altogether. These different-subject subordinate suffixes also mark verb tense and aspect: in the nominative case, they are -na if present, -h/kkan if stative, -h/kkwan if momentaneous, -ppɨh if perfect, -tu'ih if future, and -ih if unmarked.

aitɨn painkwi nɨhɨn tɨkkanna pitsikkammanna
this fish our eating tastes-rotten
"this fish that we are eating tastes rotten"

The subject "we" of the relative clause appears as the possessive pronoun nɨhɨn "our", and tɨkka- "eat" takes the suffix -nna to indicate the present action of eating.

==== Switch reference ====
Shoshoni exhibits switch reference, in which a non-relative, subordinate clause is marked when its subject is a pronoun that differs from the subject of the main clause. In such subordinate clauses, the subject takes the objective case and the verb takes on a switch reference suffix: -ku if the events of both clauses occur simultaneously, -h/kkan if the events of the subordinate clause occur first, or the combined -h/kkanku if the events of the subordinate clause occur over an extended amount of time. For example, sunni naaku wihyu nɨnɨttsi utɨɨkatti tattɨkwa "when that happened, something scary came to them." In the relative clause sunni naaku "when that happened", the verb naa- "be" or "happen" takes on the suffix -ku to indicate that the relative and main clauses co-occur in the narrative.

== Writing system ==
Shoshoni lacks a single agreed-upon writing system. Multiple orthographies exist, with differing levels of acceptance among Shoshoni speakers. Among the Shoshone, there are conflicting views on whether Shoshoni should be written at all.

Traditionalists advocate to keep Shoshoni an oral language, better protected from outsiders who might exploit the language. Meanwhile, progressives argue that writing the language down will better preserve it and make it useful today.

The older Crum-Miller system and the Idaho State University system (or Gould system) are the two main Shoshoni writing systems in use.

The Crum-Miller orthography was developed in the 1960s by Beverly Crum, a Shoshone elder and linguist, and Wick Miller, a non-Native anthropologist and linguist. The system is largely phonemic, with specific symbols mapping to specific phonemes, which reflects the underlying sounds but not necessarily surface pronunciations.

Crum-Miller Orthography
Letter	IPA
aa	ɑː
a	ɑ
a̲i̲	e
ai	a͡ɪ
e	ɨ
ee	ɨː
h	h
k	k~ɣ~g
kk	kː
hk	x
kw	kʷ~ɣʷ~gʷ
kkw	kːʷ
hkw	xʷ
m	m
mm	mː
n	n
nn	nː
o	o
oo	oː
p	p~β~b
pp	pː
hp	ɸ
s	s
is	ʃ
t	t~d~ɾ
it	ð
tt	tː
iht	θ
ts	t͡s~z
its	ʒ
tts	tt͡s
itts	t͡ʃ
u	u
uu	uː
w	w
y	j
'	ʔ

The newer Idaho State system was developed by the Shoshone elder Drusilla Gould and the non-Native linguist Christopher Loether and is used more commonly in southern Idaho. Compared to the Crum-Miller system, the Idaho State system is more phonetic, with spellings more closely reflecting the surface pronunciations of words, but it lacks the deeper phonemic information that the Crum-Miller system provides.

Online Shoshoni dictionaries are available for everyday use.

== See also ==
- Sacagawea, the Shoshone woman who translated for the Lewis and Clark Expedition
