= Northern Paiute language =

Numic language spoken in western US

Northern Paiute
- Paviotso
- Numu, nɨɨmɨ
- Native to: United States
- Region: Nevada, California, Oregon, Idaho
- Ethnicity: 6,000 Northern Paiute and Bannock (1999)
- Native speakers: 700 (2007)
- Language family: Uto-Aztecan: Northern; Numic; Western; Northern Paiute
- Dialects: Northern; Southern; Bannock

Language codes
- ISO 639-3: pao
- Glottolog: nort2954
- ELP: Northern Paiute
- Map showing the traditional geographic distribution of Northern Paiute and Mono

- Northern Paiute is classified as Definitely Endangered by the UNESCO Atlas of the World's Languages in Danger.

Northern Paiute /ˈpaɪuːt/, endonym Numu or nɨɨmɨ, also known as Paviotso, is a Western Numic language of the Uto-Aztecan family, which had around 500 fluent speakers in 1994 according to Marianne Mithun. It is closely related to the Mono language.

== Language revitalization ==
In 2005, the Northwest Indian Language Institute at the University of Oregon formed a partnership to teach Northern Paiute and Kiksht in schools on the Warm Springs Indian Reservation. In 2013, Washoe County, Nevada became the first school district in Nevada to offer Northern Paiute classes, offering an elective Northern Paiute course at Spanish Springs High School. Classes have also been taught at Reed High School in Sparks, Nevada.

Elder Ralph Burns of the Pyramid Lake Paiute Reservation worked with University of Nevada, Reno linguist Catherine Fowler to help develop a spelling system. The alphabet uses 19 letters. They have also developed a language-learning book, “Numa Yadooape,” and a series of computer disks of language lessons.

== Phonology ==
Northern Paiute's phonology is highly variable, and its phonemes have many allophones.

=== Consonants ===
	Bilabial	Alveolar	Palatal	Velar		Glottal
	Bilabial	Alveolar	Palatal	Plain	Lab.	Glottal
Nasal	m	n		ŋ		
Stop	p	t		k	kʷ	ʔ
Affricate		ts	tʃ			
Fricative		s				h
Semivowel			j		w	

=== Vowels ===
Vowel chart of the Mono Lake dialect of Northern Paiute

	Front	Central	Back
Close	i	ɨ	u
Open-Mid	e		ɔ
Open		a	

== Morphology ==
Northern Paiute is an agglutinative language in which words use suffix complexes with several morphemes strung together for a variety of purposes.

== Bibliography ==
- Liljeblad, Sven; Fowler, Catherine S.; Powell, Glenda (2012). The Northern Paiute-Bannock Dictionary, with an English-Northern Paiute-Bannock Finder List and a Northern Paiute-Bannock-English Finder List. Salt Lake City: University of Utah Press. ISBN 978-1-60781-030-8.
- Mithun, Marianne (1999). Languages of Native North America. Cambridge: Cambridge University Press.
- Snapp, Allen; Anderson, John L.; Anderson, Joy (1982). "Northern Paiute". In Langacker, Ronald W. (ed.). Sketches in Uto-Aztecan grammar, III: Uto-Aztecan grammatical sketches. Summer Institute of Linguistics Publications in Linguistics. Vol. 57. Dallas: Summer Institute of Linguistics and the University of Texas at Arlington. pp. 1–92. ISBN 0-88312-072-0. [The publication erroneously stated vol. 56, but this has been amended in the PDF made available online by the publisher.]
- Thornes, Tim (2003). A Northern Paiute Grammar with Texts (PhD thesis). Eugene: University of Oregon.
