= Population of Native California =

Population of Indigenous peoples of California

Native California Population, according to Cook 1978

The population of Native California refers to the population of Indigenous peoples of California. Estimates prior to and after European contact have varied substantially. Pre-contact estimates range from 133,000 to 705,000 with some recent scholars concluding that these estimates are low.

Following the arrival of Europeans in California, disease and violence—termed the California Genocide—reduced the population to as low as 25,000. During and after the California Gold Rush, it is estimated that miners and others killed about 4,500 Indigenous people of California between 1849 and 1870. As of 2005, California is the state with the largest self-identified Native American population according to the U.S. Census at 696,600.

== Pre-contact estimates ==
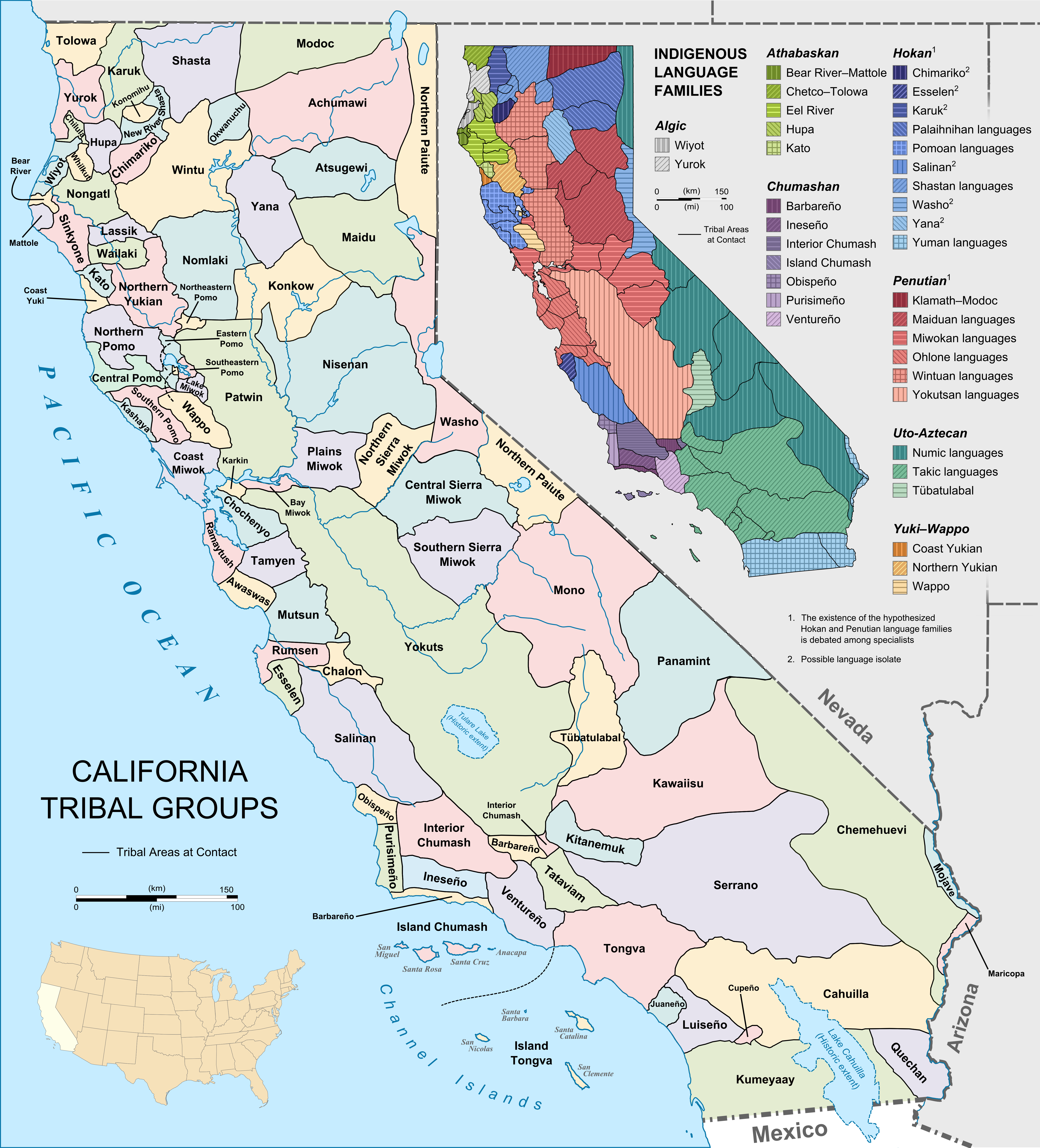
A territorial map of California tribal groups and languages prior to European contact

Historians have calculated the Native Californian population prior to European entry into the region using a number of different methods, including:

- Mission records (births, baptisms, deaths, and total numbers of neophytes at particular periods);
- Counting villages identified from historic, ethnographic, or archaeological records, multiplied by estimates of the average number of inhabitants per village;
- Ecological estimates of the regional human carrying capacity, given aboriginal technologies and economies;
- Population density extrapolations from better-documented regions to less well known ones; and
- Extrapolating from historic censuses, using estimated rates of population decrease.

Few analysts claim that these methods yield accurate numbers. The estimates developed by different analysts commonly vary by a factor of two or more. Stephen Powers initially estimated that the pre-contact population of the state was 1,520,000. He later reduced this figure to 705,000.

C. Hart Merriam offered the first detailed analysis. He based his estimates on mission records and extrapolated that to non-missionized areas. His estimate for the state as a whole was 260,000. Alfred L. Kroeber made a detailed re-analysis, both for the state as a whole and for the individual ethnolinguistic groups within it. He reduced Merriam's figure by about half, to 133,000 Native Californians in 1770.

Martin A. Baumhoff used an ecological basis to evaluate the potential carrying capacity and estimated an aboriginal population of 350,000.

Sherburne F. Cook was the most persistent and painstaking student of the problem, examining in detail both pre-contact estimates and the history of demographic decline during mission and post-mission periods. Initially, in 1943, Cook arrived at a figure only 7% higher than the one previously suggested by Kroeber: 133,550 (excluding the Modoc, Northern Paiute, Washoe, Owens Valley Paiute, and Colorado River Yumans). Cook later raised his estimate to 310,000.

Some scholars now believe that waves of epidemic diseases reached California well in advance of the arrival of the Franciscans in 1769. If correct, this may imply that population estimates using the beginning of the mission period as a baseline have substantially underestimated the state's pre-Columbian population.

== California statehood and genocide ==
Mexican sovereignty over Alta California was short lived, as after the Treaty of Guadalupe Hidalgo was signed to end the Mexican–American War in 1848, the U.S. took control of California and passed the California Statehood Act on September 9, 1850. In the latter half of the 19th century both State and Federal authorities, incited aided and financed miners, settlers, ranchers and people's militias to enslave, kidnap, murder and exterminate a major proportion of displaced Native American Indians, sometimes contemptuously referred to as "Diggers", using many of the same policies of violence against the indigenous population that it did throughout its territory.

Simultaneous to the ongoing extermination, reports of its effects were being made known to the outside world. (Note: Aboriginal Americans. Quote: 'Dr. MacGowan, in a lecture delivered at New York, estimated the present number of Indians in the United States to be about 250,000, and said that unless something prevented the oppression and cruelty of the white man, these people would gradually become reduced, and finally extinct. He predicted the total extermination of the Digger Indians of California and the tribes of other States, within ten years, if something were not done for their relief. The lecturer concluded by strongly urging the establishment of a Protective Aborigines Society, something similar to the society in England to prevent cruelty to animals. By this means he thought the condition of the Indian might be improved and the race longer perpetuated'. The British Medical Journal, Vol. 1, No. 274 (Mar. 31, 1866), p. 350)

A notable early eyewitness testimony and account: "The Indians of California" 1864, is from John Ross Browne, Custom's official and Inspector of Indian Affairs on the Pacific Coast systematically categorizing the fraud, corruption, land theft, slavery, rape and massacre perpetrated on a substantial portion of the aboriginal population.

By one estimate, at least 4,500 California Indians were killed between 1849 and 1870. Historian Benjamin Madley recorded the numbers of killings of California Indians between 1846 and 1873 and estimated that during this period at least 9,400 to 16,000 California Indians were killed by non-Indians, mostly occurring in more than 370 massacres (defined as the "intentional killing of five or more disarmed combatants or largely unarmed noncombatants, including women, children, and prisoners, whether in the context of a battle or otherwise"). Professor Ed Castillo, of Sonoma State University, provides a higher estimate: "The handiwork of these well armed death squads combined with the widespread random killing of Indians by individual miners resulted in the death of 100,000 Indians in the first two years of the gold rush."

== Post-contact changes ==
The decline of Native Californian populations during the late 18th and 19th centuries was investigated in detail by Cook. Cook assessed the relative importance of the various sources of the decline, including Old World epidemic diseases, violence, nutritional changes, and cultural shock. Declines tended to be steepest in the areas directly affected by the missions and the Gold Rush. Other studies have addressed the changes that occurred within individual regions or ethnolinguistic groups.

The number of Native people in California fell to its lowest point of around 25,000 at the end of the 19th century. Based on Kroeber's estimate of 133,000 people in 1770, this represents a more than 80% decrease. Using Cook's revised figure, it constitutes a decline of more than 90%. On this Cook rendered his harshest criticism:

The first (factor) was the food supply ... The second factor was disease. ... A third factor, which strongly intensified the effect of the other two, was the social and physical disruption visited upon the Indian. He was driven from his home by the thousands, starved, beaten, raped, and murdered with impunity. He was not only given no assistance in the struggle against foreign diseases, but was prevented from adopting even the most elementary measures to secure his food, clothing, and shelter. The utter devastation caused by the white man was literally incredible, and not until the population figures are examined does the extent of the havoc become evident.

The population subsequently rose substantially throughout the 20th century. This recovery may represent both true demographic growth and changing patterns in ethnic self-description. In the 21st century, after more than eight generations of close interaction between Native Californians and individuals of European, Asian, African, and other Native American descent, there can be little objective basis for quantifying the Native Californian component within the state's population. However, reservation rolls and census self-descriptions provide some information.

== See also ==
- Population history of indigenous peoples of the Americas
- Mission Indians
- California mission clash of cultures
- California Genocide
- Bibliography of California history
