= Owens Valley =

Valley in California, United States

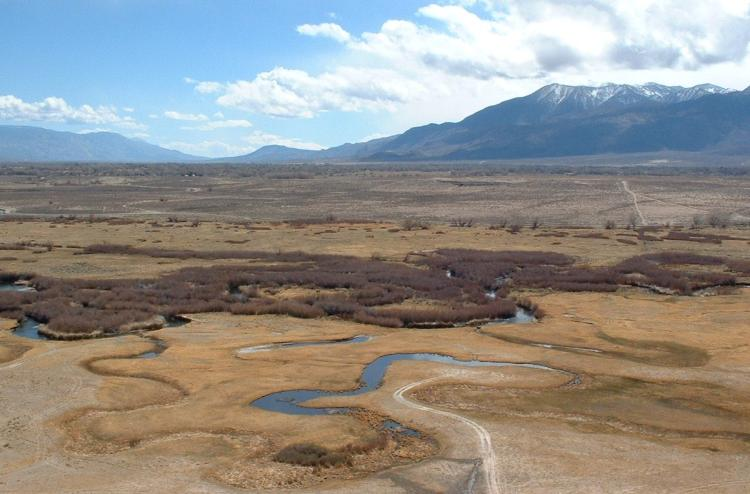
- Owens River from Bishop Tuff tableland

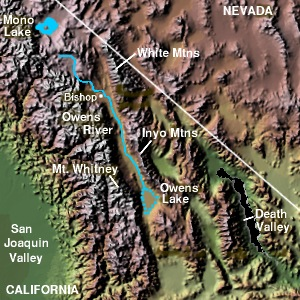
- Floor elevation: 4,300 ft (1,300 m)
- Length: 75 mi (121 km) N/S
- Depth: 10,000 ft (3,000 m)

Naming
- Native name: Payahuunadü (Mono)

Geography
- Population centers: Bishop, Lone Pine, Independence, Big Pine
- Borders on: Inyo Mountains (E); Coso Range (SE); Rose Valley (S); Sierra Nevada (W) Chalfant Valley (N)
- Coordinates: 36°48′09″N 118°11′59″W
- Traversed by: U.S. Route 395
- Rivers: Owens River

Owens Valley (Mono: Payahǖǖnadǖ, meaning "place of flowing water") is an arid valley of the Owens River in eastern California in the United States. It is located to the east of the Sierra Nevada, west of the White Mountains and Inyo Mountains, and is split between the Great Basin Desert and the Mojave Desert. The mountain peaks on its west side (including Mount Whitney) reach above 14,000 feet (4,300 m) in elevation, while the floor of the Owens Valley is at about 4,000 feet (1,200 m), making the valley the deepest in the United States. The Sierra Nevada casts the valley in a rain shadow, which makes Owens Valley "the Land of Little Rain". The bed of Owens Lake, now a predominantly dry endorheic alkali flat, sits on the southern end of the valley.

The current arid nature of the valley is mostly due to the Los Angeles Department of Water and Power diverting the water of the region. The valley provides water to the Los Angeles Aqueduct, the source of one-third of the water for the city, and was at the center of one of the fiercest and longest-running episodes of the California Water Wars. Owens Lake was completely emptied by 1926, only 13 years after Los Angeles began diverting water. The water diversions inspired aspects of the 1974 film Chinatown.

Towns in the Owens Valley include Bishop, Lone Pine, Independence and Big Pine; about 25,000 people live in the valley. The major road in the Owens Valley is U.S. Route 395.

== Geology ==
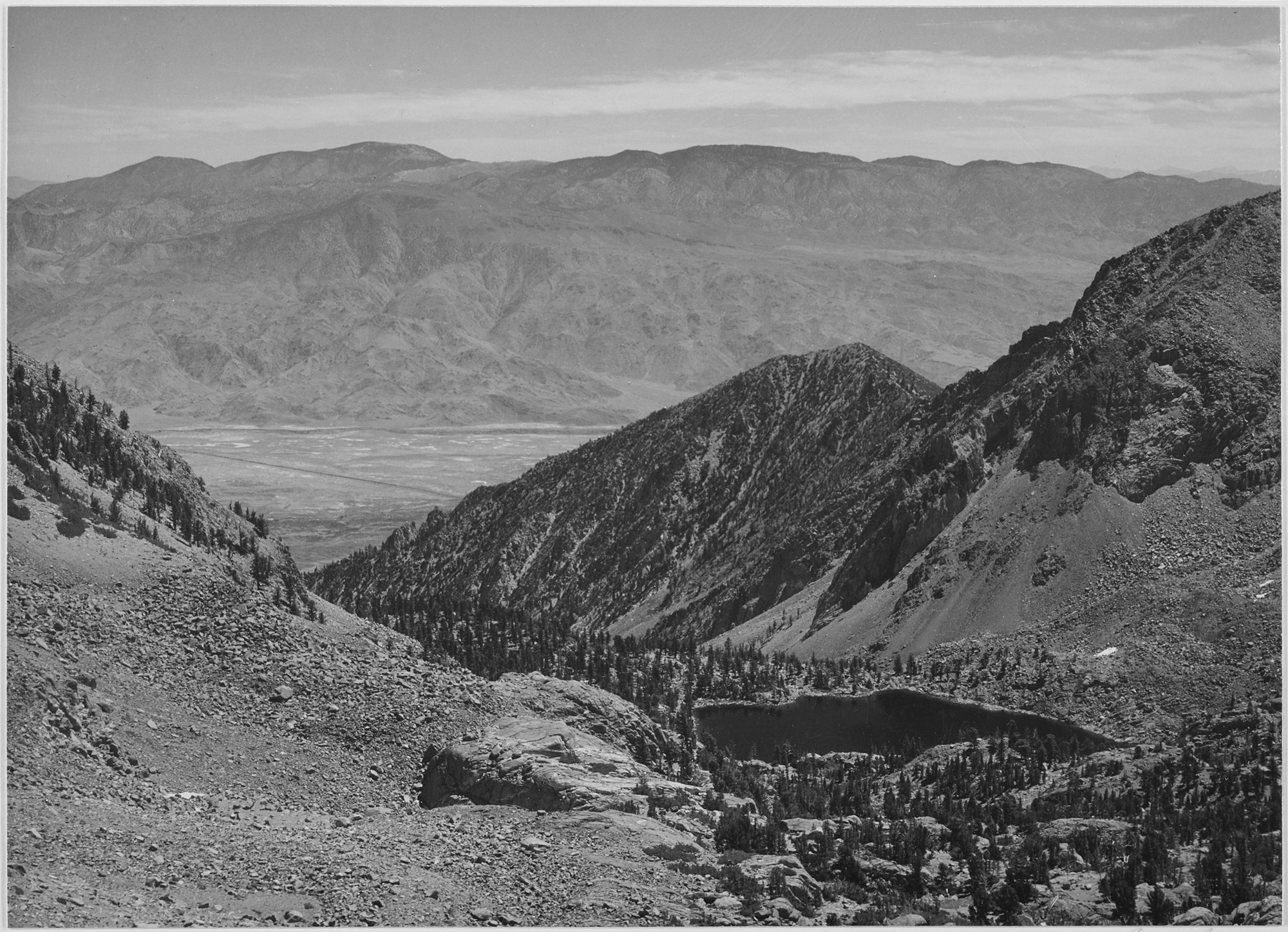
Owens Valley, photographed from Sawmill Pass by Ansel Adams, circa 1936.

About three million years ago, the Sierra Nevada Fault and the White Mountains Fault systems became active with repeated episodes of slip earthquakes gradually producing the impressive relief of the eastern Sierra Nevada and White Mountain escarpments that bound the northern Owens Valley-Mono Basin region.

Owens Valley is a graben—a down-dropped block of land between two vertical faults—the westernmost in the Basin and Range Province. It is also part of a trough which extends from Oregon to Death Valley called the Walker Lane.

The western flank of much of the valley has large moraines coming off the Sierra Nevada. These unsorted piles of rock, boulders, and dust were pushed to where they are by glaciers during the last ice age. An excellent example of a moraine is on State Route 168 as it climbs into Buttermilk Country.

This graben was formed by a long series of earthquakes, such as the 1872 Lone Pine earthquake, that have moved the graben down and helped move the Sierra Nevada up. The graben is much larger than the depth of the valley suggests; gravity studies suggest that 10,000 feet (3,048 m) of sedimentary rock mostly fills the graben and that a very steep escarpment is buried under the western length of the valley. The topmost part of this escarpment is exposed at Alabama Hills.

The Owens Valley has many mini-volcanoes, such as Crater Mountain in the Big Pine volcanic field. Smaller versions of the Devils Postpile, can be found, for example, by Little Lake.

== Ecology ==
The valley is split between four different ecoregions, as defined by the United States Environmental Protection Agency: "Upper Owens Valley" and "Tonopah Sagebrush Foothills" (as part of the Great Basin Desert), and "Western Mojave Basins" and "Mojave Playas" (as part of the Mojave Desert).

The floor of the valley, roughly north of the town of Independence, California, lies in the "Upper Owens Valley" ecoregion. The ecoregion also includes the distinct Alabama Hills in the far south. The primary landforms of this ecoregion are gently to moderately sloping alluvial fans and mostly level basin floors, terraces, and floodplains. Elevations range from about 3,800 feet (1,200 m) along the Owens River in the south to more than 6,000 feet (1,800 m) where the higher fans descend from adjacent mountains. Alluvium from the Quaternary period covers the region, with some small areas of lava flows. Shrub-covered rangeland is the dominant land cover, with minor areas of hay and pastureland. Vegetation includes big sagebrush, rabbitbrush, spiny hopsage, antelope bitterbrush, saltbush, ephedra, and several perennial grasses including desert needlegrass. Along the Owens River, some restoration of cottonwoods, willows, and wetlands has occurred.

The eastern slopes of the valley lie in the "Tonopah Sagebrush Foothills" ecoregion. The soil is rocky and lacks the fine sediments found at lower elevations of the Tonopah Basin. Great Basin species are common in this ecoregion. However, because the ecoregion is in the rain shadow of the Sierra Nevada, and is adjacent to the Mojave Desert, the aridity leads to black sagebrush being common and the more mesic understory species being largely absent. Other Mojave Desert species, such as blackbrush, Joshua tree, and cholla cactus are common where summer moisture is more prevalent. Streams are ephemeral and flow during and immediately after storms. Storm events can be of sufficient magnitude to move large quantities of sediment in streambeds Because of the arid conditions, this ecoregion has low carrying capacity for cattle.

The southern part of the valley, except for the bed of Owens Lake, lies in the "Western Mojave Basins" ecoregion. The ecoregion is typically dominated by creosotebush and white bursage, with areas of shadscale, fourwing saltbush, and on some upper bajadas and fans, scattered Joshua trees. This ecoregion has little summer rainfall compared to the basins in the eastern Mojave Desert, and typically lacks species such as Mojave yucca and big galleta.

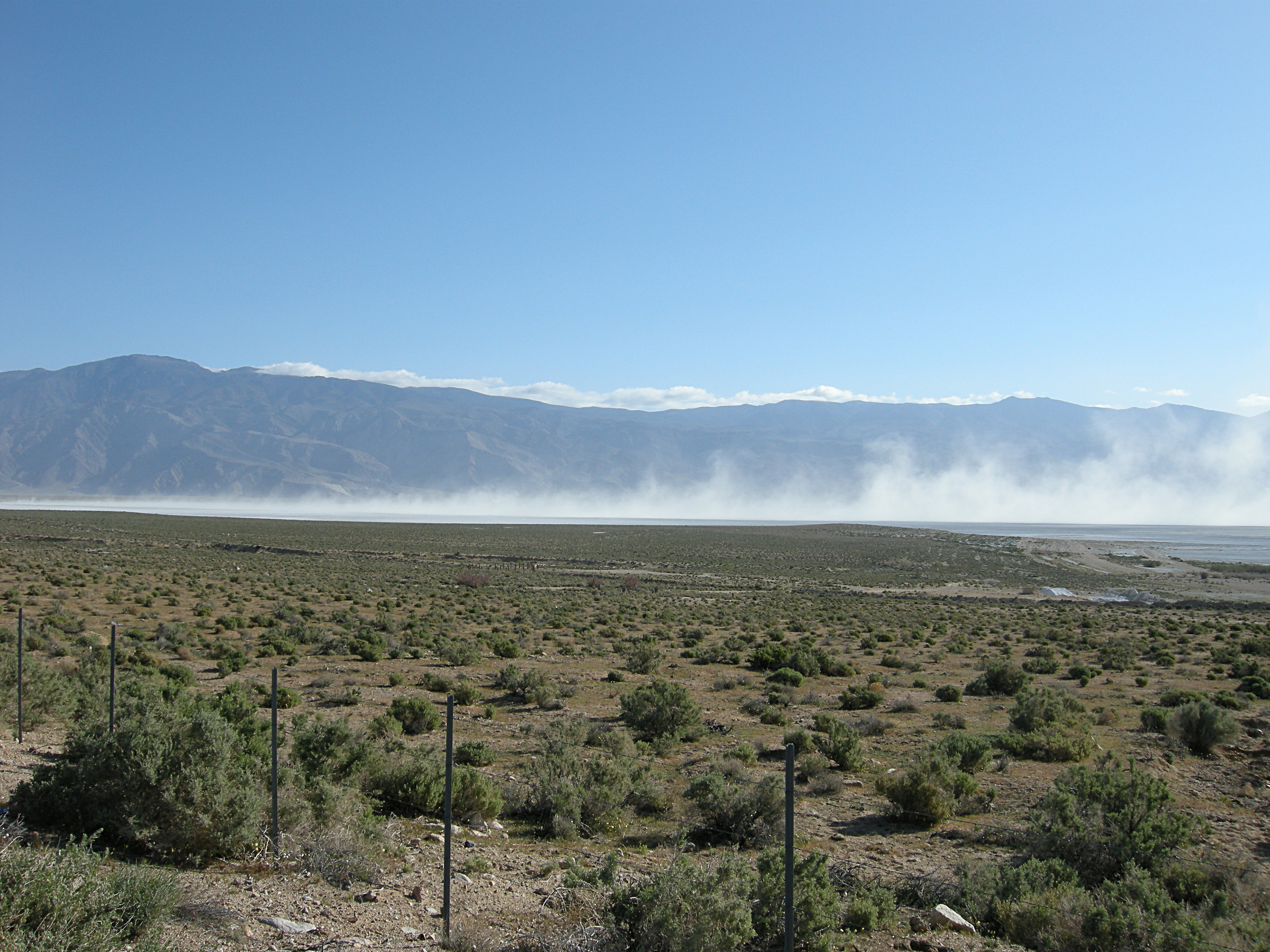
Alkaline dust blowing off the dry bed of Owens Lake

The lakebed of Owens Lake is considered to be a "Mojave Playa". The high salt and clay content of playa surface mud, and the hot, dry conditions inhibit plant growth. This ecoregion is largely barren and only sparse saltbush vegetation typically is found on the margins. Playas are dynamic environments with surface channels, playa margins, alluvial materials, and biota changing with each flooding event. Physical and biological crusts on soil surfaces are important, stabilizing soil and reducing erosion from wind and water.

The valley contains plants adapted to alkali flat habitat. One of these, the Owens Valley checkerbloom (Sidalcea covillei), is endemic to Owens Valley.

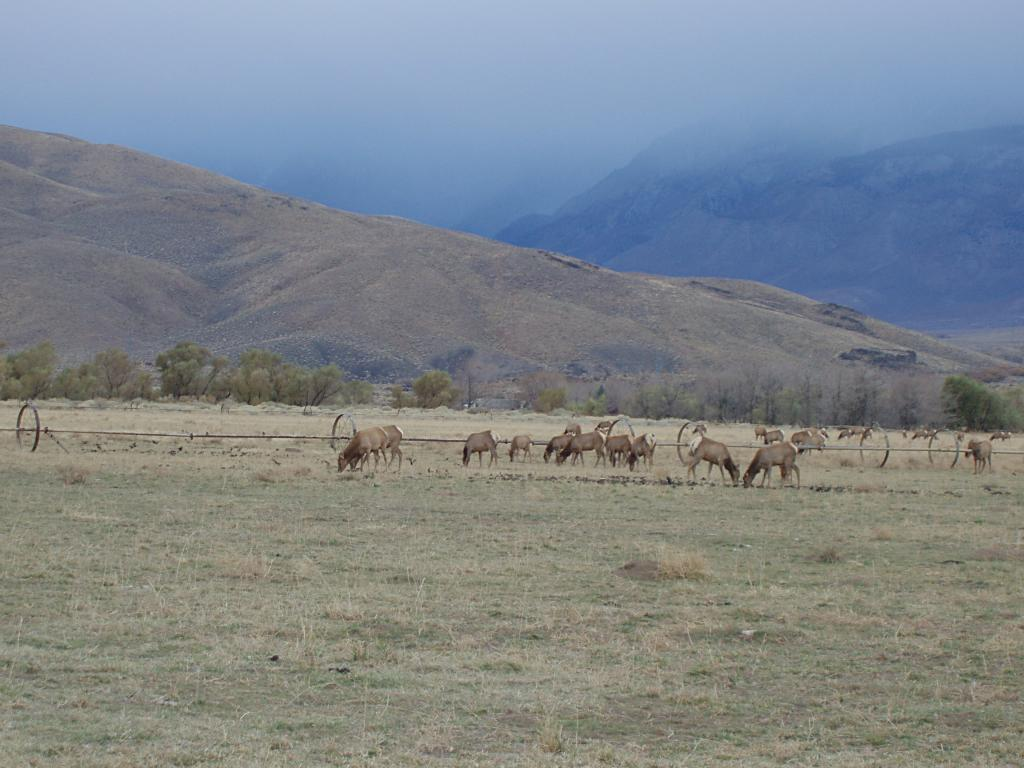
Tule Elk grazing in Owens Valley.

Tule elk were introduced into the Owens Valley by the State of California in 1933. From the original 56 introduced elk, the herd grew to 300 individuals by 1952, which precipitated conflicts with ranchers due to destruction of property by the elk. Currently, the total elk population is managed to be approximately 490.

== History ==
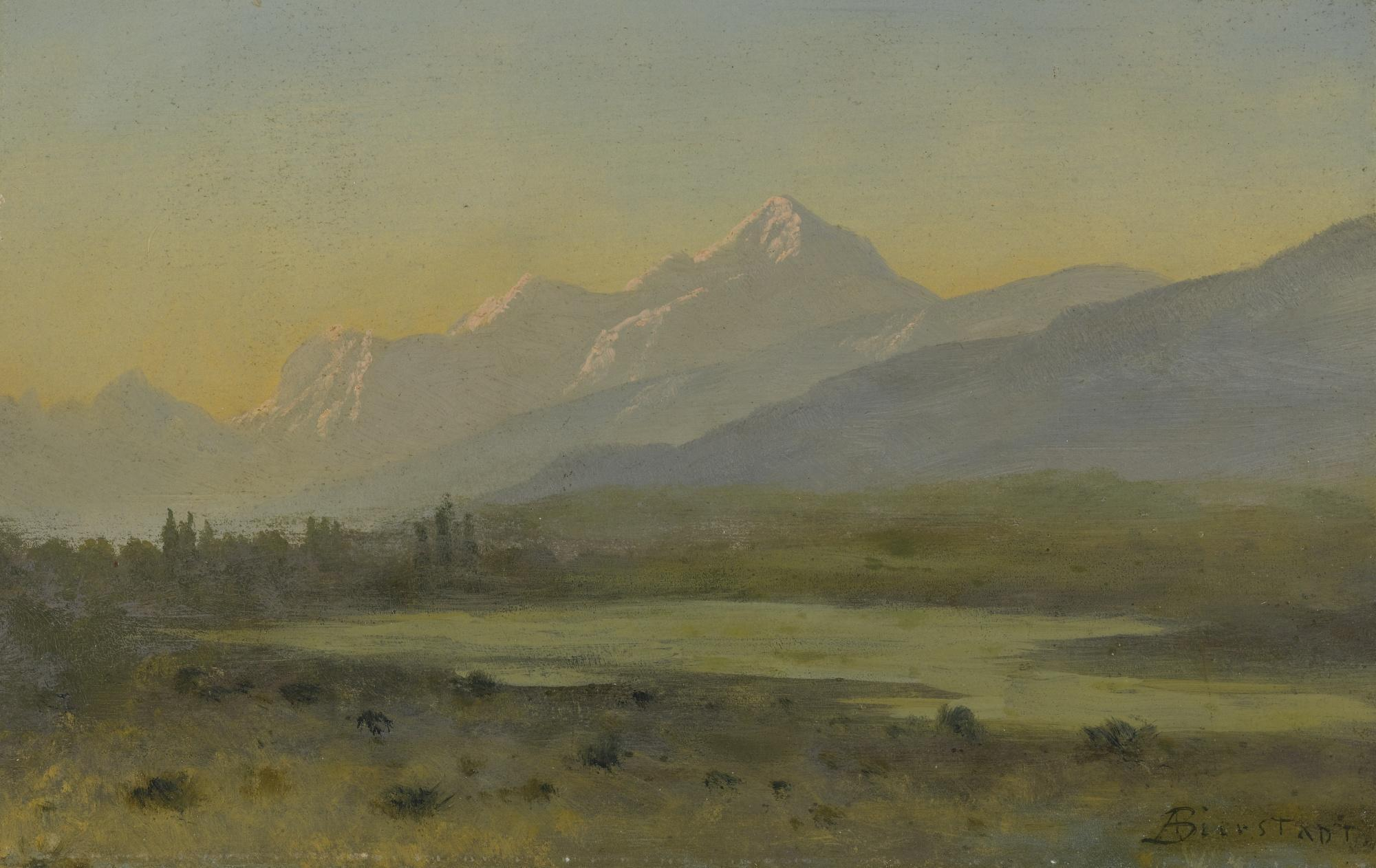
Albert Bierstadt, Owens Valley, California

The valley was inhabited in late prehistoric times by the Timbisha (also called Panamint or Koso) in the extreme south end around Owens Lake and by the Mono tribe (also called Owens Valley Paiute) in the central and northern portions of the valley. The Timbisha speak the Timbisha language, classified in the Numic branch of Uto-Aztecan language family. The closest related languages are Shoshoni and Comanche. The Eastern Mono speak a dialect of the Mono language, which is also Numic but is more closely related to Northern Paiute. The Timbisha presently live in Death Valley at Furnace Creek although most families also have summer homes in the Lone Pine colony. The Eastern Mono live in several colonies from Lone Pine to Bishop. They lived along the rivers and creeks which were fed by snowmelt from the eastern slopes of the Sierra Nevada. Trade between Native Americans of the Owens Valley and coastal tribes such as the Chumash has been indicated by the archaeological record.

On May 1, 1834, Joseph R. Walker entered Owens Valley from the south, having crossed the Sierra Nevada at Walker Pass. Walker and his group of 52 men traveled up the valley on their way back to the Humboldt Sink, and back up the Humboldt River to the Rocky Mountains.

In 1845, John C. Fremont named the Owens valley, river, and lake for Richard Owens, one of his guides. Camp Independence was established on Oak Creek near modern Independence, on July 4, 1862, during the Owens Valley Indian War.

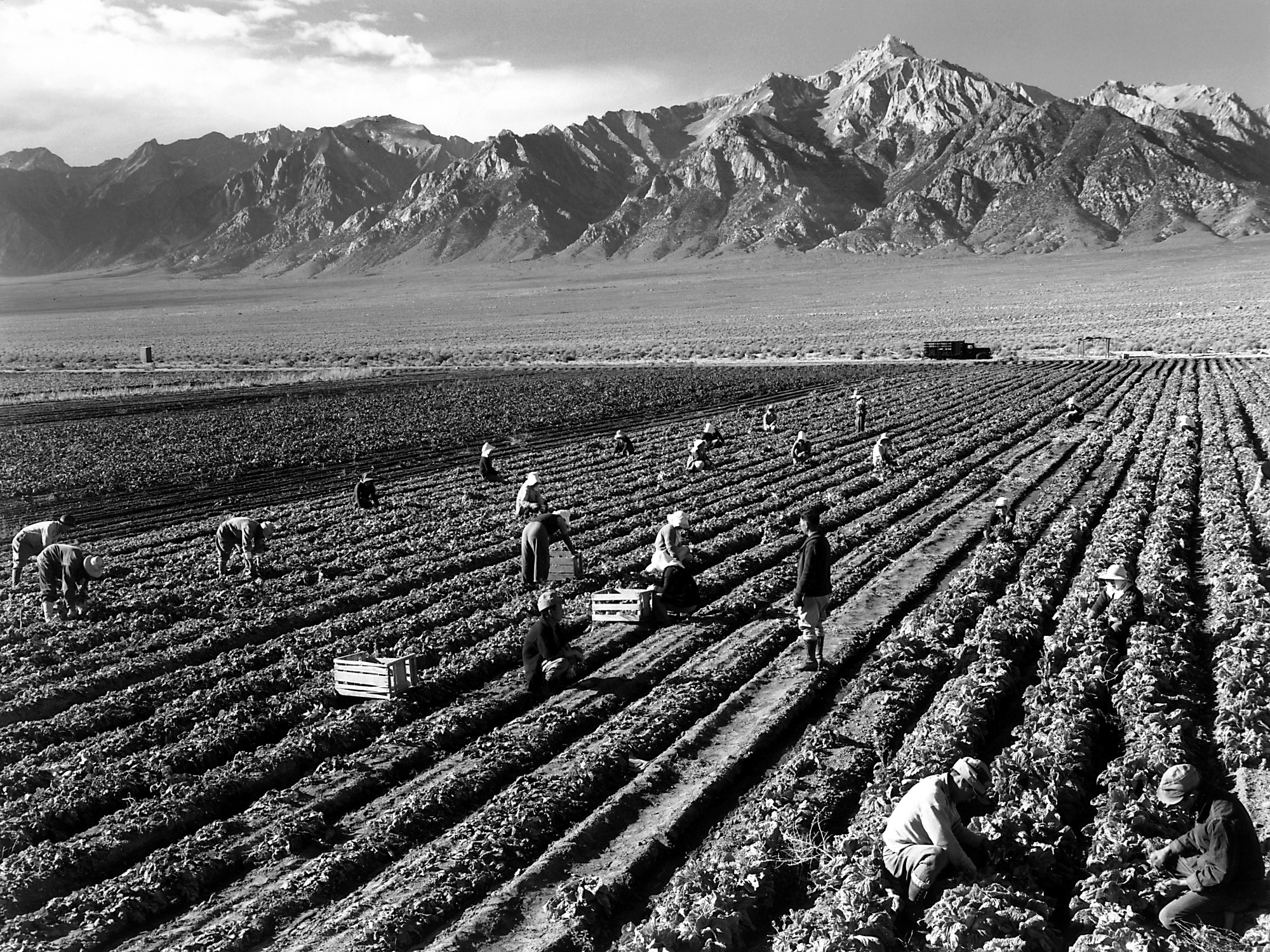
Farmworkers in the Manzanar Relocation Camp

From 1942 to 1945, during World War II, the first Japanese American concentration camp operated in the valley at Manzanar near Independence.

=== Water diversion to Los Angeles ===
In the early 20th century, the valley became the scene of a struggle between local residents and the city of Los Angeles over water rights. William Mulholland, superintendent of the Los Angeles Department of Water and Power (LADWP), planned the 223-mile (359 km) Los Angeles Aqueduct, completed in 1913, which diverted water from the Owens River. The water rights were acquired deceitfully, often splitting water cooperatives and pitting neighbors against one another. In 1924, local farmers were fed up with the purchases and erupted in violence, sabotaging parts of the water system.

Eventually, Los Angeles acquired a large portion of the water rights to over 300,000 acres (121,000 ha) of land in the valley, almost completely diverting the water inflows away from Owens Lake. Gary Libecap of the University of California, Santa Barbara, observed that the price Los Angeles was willing to pay to other water sources per volume of water was far higher than what the farmers received. Farmers who resisted the pressure from Los Angeles until 1930 received the highest price for their land; most farmers sold their land from 1905 to 1925, and received less than Los Angeles was willing to pay. The sale of their land brought the farmers substantially more income than if they had kept the land for farming and ranching. None of the sales were made under threat of eminent domain. As a result of these acquisitions, the lake subsequently dried up completely, leaving the present alkali flat which plagues the southern valley with alkali dust storms.

In 1970, LADWP completed a second aqueduct from Owens Valley. More surface water was diverted, and groundwater was pumped to feed the aqueduct. Owens Valley springs and seeps dried and disappeared, and groundwater-dependent vegetation began to die.

Years of litigation followed. In 1997, Inyo County, Los Angeles, the Owens Valley Committee, the Sierra Club, and other concerned parties signed a Memorandum of Understanding that specified terms by which the lower Owens River would be rewatered by June 2003. LADWP missed this deadline and was sued again. Under another settlement, this time including the State of California, Los Angeles promised to rewater the lower Owens River by September 2005. In July 2004, Los Angeles mayor James Hahn proposed barring all future development on its Owens Valley holdings by proposing a conservation easement for all LADWP land. They did not meet this extended deadline. In 2008, Los Angeles fulfilled its promise and rewatered the lower Owens River.

Pursuant to a 2014 agreement between the city and Great Basin Unified Air Pollution Control District (GBUAPCD, the Owens Valley air quality regulators), LADWP began using a new method of suppressing airborne dust from the dry bed of Owens Lake. In 2022, the GBUAPCD issued an order and subsequently fined the Los Angeles utility for ignoring an order to control dust on a 5-acre patch (2.0 ha) of dry lake bed. The LADWP responded with a lawsuit, accusing the air district of exceeding its authority and ordering dust control measures without first conducting an environmental analysis of its impacts, as required by the California Environmental Quality Act. A California Superior Court ruled that the 2014 agreement does not cover the dispute and the fines levied by GBUAPCD are unenforceable.

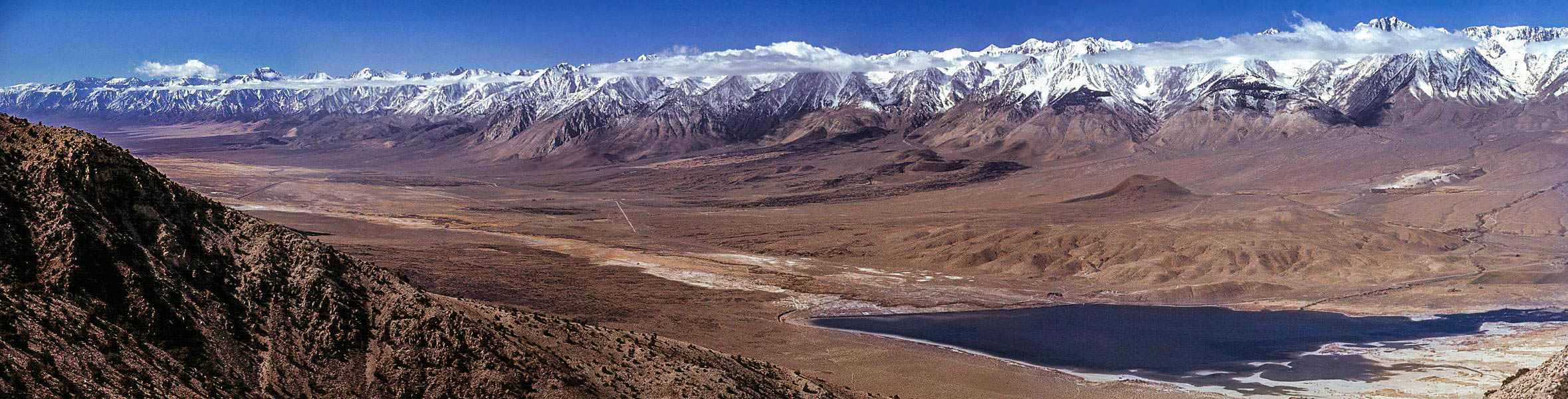
Owens Valley, and the Sierra Escarpment (Tinemaha Reservoir in the foreground)

== Radio observatory ==
The Owens Valley Radio Observatory located near Westgard Pass is one of ten dishes making up the Very Long Baseline Array (VLBA).
