= Mono traditional narratives =

Mono traditional narratives include myths, legends, tales, and oral histories preserved by the Mono people, including the Owens Valley Paiute east of the Sierra Nevada and the Monache on that range's western slope, in present-day eastern California.

An interesting contrast exists in Mono oral literature. The eastern group, the Owens Valley Paiute, have narratives that most closely match those of their Great Basin kinsmen, the Northern Paiute, Shoshone, Southern Paiute, and Kawaiisu. The traditions of the western group, the Monache, are more similar to those of such central Californians as the Yokuts and Valley and Sierra Miwok.

== See also ==
- Traditional narratives (Native California)
- Owens Valley

== Online examples of Mono narratives ==
- The North American Indian by Edward S. Curtis (1926)

== Sources for Mono narratives ==
- Curtis, Edward S. 1907–1930. The North American Indian. 20 vols. Plimpton Press, Norwood, Massachusetts.(Two Owens Valley Paiute myths collected from Mose Weyland, vol. 15, pp. 123–129.)
- Gayton, Anna H. 1930a. "Yokuts-Mono Chiefs and Shamans". University of California Publications in American Archaeology and Ethnology 24:361-420. Berkeley. (Portrayals of chiefs in myths, pp. 369–371.)
- Gayton, Anna H. 1930b. "The Ghost Dance of 1870 in South-Central California". University of California Publications in American Archaeology and Ethnology 28:57-82. Berkeley. (Yokuts/Mono version of the Orpheus legend, p. 77.)
- Gayton, Anna H., and Stanley S. Newman. 1940. "Yokuts and Western Mono Myths". Anthropological Records 5:1-110. University of California, Berkeley. (Variants of myths, including Earth Diver, Theft of Fire, and Orpheus, from many Yokuts and Monache groups collected in 1925–1931, with comparative notes.)
- Gifford, Edward Winslow. 1923. "Western Mono Myths". Journal of American Folklore 36:301-367. (Narratives, including Earth Diver, Orpheus, and Bear and Fawns, collected at North Fork in 1918.)
- Gifford, Edward Winslow, and Gwendoline Harris Block. 1930. California Indian Nights. Arthur H. Clark, Glendale, California. (Seven previously published narratives, pp. 91–94, 156–157, 167–168, 177–179, 187–189, 253–258, 285–287.)
- Margolin, Malcolm. 1993. The Way We Lived: California Indian Stories, Songs, and Reminiscences. First edition 1981. Heyday Books, Berkeley, California. (Two myths, pp. 123, 155–156, from Steward 1936.)
- Steward, Julian H. 1933. "Ethnography of the Owens Valley Paiute". University of California Publications in American Archaeology and Ethnology 33:233-350. Berkeley. (Brief notes on myths collected by others, including Earth Diver, pp. 323–324.)
- Steward, Julian H. 1936. "Myths of the Owens Valley Paiute". University of California Publications in American Archaeology and Ethnology 34:355-440. Berkeley. (Narratives, including Theft of Fire, collected in 1927–1928, with comparisons and also some Northern Paiute and Shoshone myths.)
