= Numic languages =

Uto-Aztecan language branch of US

Numic
- Geographic distribution: Western United States
- Linguistic classification: Uto-Aztecan: Northern; Numic
- Subdivisions: Western Numic; Central Numic; Southern Numic

Language codes
- Glottolog: numi1242

Numic (/ˈnʌmɪk/ or /ˈnuːmɪk/) is the northernmost branch of the Uto-Aztecan language family. It includes seven languages spoken by Native American peoples traditionally living in the Great Basin, Colorado River basin, Snake River basin, and southern Great Plains. The word "Numic" comes from the cognate word in all Numic languages for "person", which reconstructs to Proto-Numic as /*nɨmɨ/. For example, in the three Central Numic languages and the two Western Numic languages, the word for "person" is /nɨmɨ/. In Kawaiisu, it is /nɨwɨ/, and in Colorado River, it is /nɨwɨ/, /nɨŋwɨ/, and /nuu/.

Tree of Numic languages. Dialects are in italics.

== Classification ==
Map of historical distribution of Numic languages. Western Numic languages are shown in green, Central Numic in blue, and Southern Numic in yellow.

These languages are classified into three groups:

- Numic
  - Central Numic languages
    - Comanche
    - Timbisha (a dialect chain with main regional varieties being Western, Central, and Eastern)
    - Shoshoni (a dialect chain with main regional varieties being Western, Gosiute, Northern, and Eastern)
  - Southern Numic languages
    - Kawaiisu
    - Colorado River (a dialect chain with main regional varieties being Chemehuevi, Southern Paiute, and Ute)
  - Western Numic languages
    - Mono (two main dialects: Eastern and Western)
    - Northern Paiute (a dialect chain with main regional varieties being Southern Nevada, Northern Nevada, Oregon, and Bannock)

Apart from Comanche, each of these groups contains one language spoken in a small area in the southern Sierra Nevada and valleys to the east (Mono, Timbisha, and Kawaiisu), and one language spoken in a much larger area extending to the north and east (Northern Paiute, Shoshoni, and Colorado River). Some linguists have taken this pattern as an indication that Numic speaking peoples expanded quite recently from a small core, perhaps near the Owens Valley, into their current range. This view is supported by lexicostatistical studies. Fowler's reconstruction of Proto-Numic ethnobiology also points to the southern Sierra Nevada as the homeland of Proto-Numic approximately two millennia ago. A mitochondrial DNA study from 2001 supports this linguistic hypothesis. The anthropologist Peter N. Jones thinks this evidence is circumstantial nature, but this is a distinctly minority opinion among specialists in Numic. David Shaul has proposed that the Southern Numic languages spread eastward long before the Central and Western Numic languages expanded into the Great Basin.

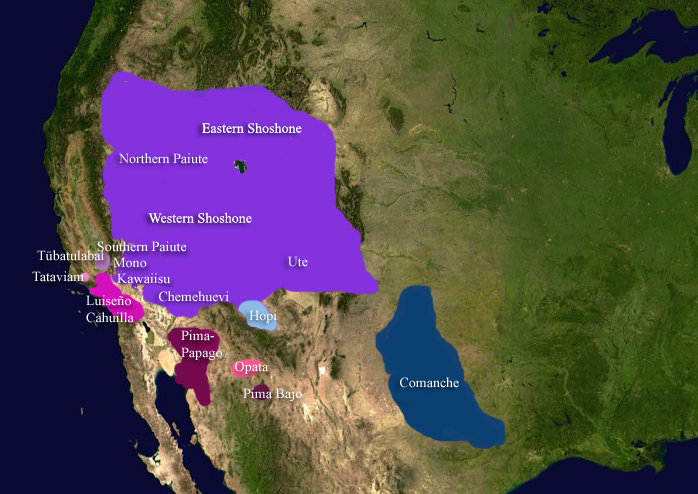
Distribution of Uto-Aztecan languages in present-day Western United States at the time of first European contact showing various Numic languages

Bands of eastern Shoshoni split off from the main Shoshoni body in the very late 17th or very early 18th century and moved southeastward onto the Great Plains. Changes in their Shoshoni dialect eventually produced Comanche. The Comanche language and the Shoshoni language are quite similar, although certain low-level consonant changes in Comanche have inhibited mutual intelligibility.

Recent lexical and grammatical diffusion studies in Western Numic have shown that while there are clear linguistic changes that separate Northern Paiute as a distinct variety, there are no unique linguistic changes that mark Mono as a distinct variety.

== Major sound changes ==
The sound system of Numic is set forth in the following tables.

=== Vowels ===
Proto-Numic had an inventory of five vowels.

	front	back unrounded	back rounded
High	*i	*ɨ	*u
Non-High		*a	*o

=== Consonants ===
Proto-Numic had the following consonant inventory:

	Bilabial	Coronal	Palatal	Velar	Labialized velar	Glottal
Stop	*p	*t		*k	*kʷ	*ʔ
Affricate		*ts				
Fricative		*s				*h
Nasal	*m	*n		*ŋ	(*ŋʷ)	
Semivowel			*j		*w	

In addition to the above simple consonants, Proto-Numic also had nasal-stop/affricate clusters and all consonants except *s, *h, *j, and *w could be geminated. Between vowels, short consonants were lenited.

=== Major Central Numic consonant changes ===
The major difference between Proto-Central Numic and Proto-Numic was the phonemic split of Proto-Numic geminate consonants into geminate consonants and preaspirated consonants. The conditioning factors involve stress shifts and are complex. The preaspirated consonants surfaced as voiceless fricatives, often preceded by a voiceless vowel.

Shoshoni and Comanche have both lost the velar nasals, merging them with *n or turning them into velar nasal-stop clusters. In Comanche, nasal-stop clusters have become simple stops, but p and t from these clusters do not lenite intervocalically. This change postdates the earliest record of the Comanche from 1786, but precedes the 20th century. Geminated stops in Comanche have also become phonetically preaspirated.

=== Major Southern Numic consonant changes ===
Proto-Southern Numic preserved the Proto-Numic consonant system fairly intact, but the individual languages have undergone several changes.

Modern Kawaiisu has reanalyzed nasal-stop clusters as voiced stops, although older recordings preserve some of these clusters. Geminated stops and affricates are voiceless, and non-geminated stops and affricates are voiced fricatives. The velar nasals have fallen together with the alveolar nasals.

The dialects of the Colorado River east of Chemehuevi have lost *h. The dialects east of Kaibab have collapsed the nasal-stop clusters with the geminated stops and affricates.

=== Major Western Numic consonant changes ===
Proto-Western Numic changed the nasal-stop clusters of Proto-Numic into voiced geminate stops. In Mono and all Northern Paiute dialects except Southern Nevada, these voiced geminate stops have become voiceless.

=== Sample Numic cognate sets ===
The following table shows some sample Numic cognate sets illustrating the changes above. Forms in the daughter languages are written in broad phonetic transcription rather than phonemic transcription that sometimes masks differences between forms. Italicized vowels and sonorants are voiceless.

	Mono	Northern Paiute	Timbisha	Shoshoni	Comanche	Kawaiisu	Colorado River
*hoa 'hunt, trap'	hoa	hoa	hɨwa	hɨa	hɨa	hɨa	oa (SP) 'spy'
*jaka 'cry'	jaɣa	jaɣa	jaɣa	jaɣai	jake	jaɣi	jaɣa
*kaipa 'mountain'	kaiβa	kaiβa				keeβi	kaiβa
*kuttsu 'bison'	kuttsu	kuttsu 'cow'	kwittʃu 'cow'	kuittʃun 'cow'	kuhtsu 'cow'		kuttsu
*naŋka 'ear'	nakka	nakka naɡɡa (So Nev)	naŋɡa	naŋɡi	naki	naɣaβiβi	naŋkaβɨ (Ch) nakka- (Ut)
*oppimpɨ 'mesquite'			oɸimbɨ	oɸi 'mesquite bean'		oβi(m)bɨ	oppimpɨ (Ch)
*paŋkʷi 'fish'	pakkʷi	pakkʷi paɡɡʷi (So Nev)	paŋŋʷi	paiŋɡʷi	pekʷi		
*puŋku 'pet, dog'	pukku	pukku puɡɡu (So Nev) 'horse'	puŋɡu 'pet'	puŋɡu 'horse'	puku 'horse'	puɣu	puŋku (Ch) pukku (Ut) 'pet'
*tɨpa 'pine nut'	tɨβa	tɨβa	tɨβa	tɨβa		tɨβattsi	tɨβa
*woŋko 'pine'	wokkoβɨ	wokkoppi oɡɡoppi (So Nev)	woŋɡoβi	woŋɡoβin	wokoβi	woɣo- (only in compounds)	oɣompɨ
