= Mono language (California) =

Native American language of California

Mono
- Native to: United States
- Region: California
- Ethnicity: Mono and Owens Valley Paiute
- Native speakers: (40 cited 1994, Western Mono); 50 (1994, Owens Valley Paiute)
- Language family: Uto-Aztecan: Northern; Numic; Western; Mono
- Dialects: Mono; Owens Valley Paiute

Language codes
- ISO 639-3: mnr
- Glottolog: mono1275
- ELP: Mono (United States)

- Mono is classified as Critically Endangered by the UNESCO Atlas of the World's Languages in Danger.

Mono (/ˈmoʊnoʊ/ MOH-noh) is a Native American language of the Numic group of Uto-Aztecan languages, the ancestral language of the Mono people. Mono consists of two dialects, Eastern and Western. The name "Monachi" is commonly used in reference to Western Mono and "Owens Valley Paiute" in reference to Eastern Mono. In 1925, Alfred Kroeber estimated that Mono had 3,000 to 4,000 speakers. Hinton (1994) reports only 90 elderly people spoke Mono as their first language. Mono is classified as critically endangered by UNESCO. It is spoken in the southern Sierra Nevada, the Mono Basin, and the Owens Valley of central-eastern California. Mono is most closely related to Northern Paiute; these two are classified as the Western group of the Numic branch of the Uto-Aztecan language family.

== Western Mono ==
Story in Mono recorded by the UCLA Phonetics Lab in 1984

Hinton (1994), presenting undated figures, estimated the number of native speakers to be between 37 and 41. The majority of speakers were from the Northfork Rancheria and the community of Auberry. The Big Sandy Rancheria and Dunlap had from 12 to 14 speakers. Golla (2007), also with undated figures, estimated the number of Western Mono speakers to be over 20, with another 100 semi-speakers.

The Northfork Mono are developing a dictionary, and both they and the Big Sandy Rancheria provide language classes. While not all are completely fluent, about 100 members of Northfork have "some command of the language." In the late 1950s, Lamb compiled a dictionary and grammar of Northfork Mono. The Western Mono language has a number of Spanish loanwords dating to the period of Spanish colonization of the Californias, as well as loanwords from Yokuts and Miwok.

== Owens Valley Paiute ==
Hinton (1994) estimated that 50 people spoke the Owens Valley Paiute language, also known as Eastern Mono. Golla (2007) estimated the number to be under 30.

Informal language classes exist and singers keep native language songs alive. Linguist Sydney Lamb studied this language in the 1950s and proposed the name Paviotso, but that was not widely adopted.

== Phonemes ==
=== Vowels ===
	front	central	back
High	i	ɨ (Note: Represented phonemically as /y/ by Lamb, but is described as being phonetically [ɨ] after front consonants and [ʉ] after back consonants.)	u
Non-High	e	a	o

- Vowel length is also evenly distributed among the dialects.

=== Consonants ===
Below is given the consonant phoneme inventory of Northfork Western Mono and Owens Valley Paiute as presented by Lamb (1958) and Liljeblad & Fowler (1986).

Consonants of Western Mono
	Bilabial	Coronal	Palatal	Velar		Uvular		Glottal
	Bilabial	Coronal	Palatal	plain	lab.	plain	lab.	Glottal
Nasal	m	n						
Plosive	p	t		k	kʷ	q (Note: /k/ and /q/ are in semi-complementary distribution: /k/ occurs before /i/ and /e/, /q/ occurs before /o/ and /u/. They contrast only before /a/.)	qʷ	ʔ
Affricate		ts						
Fricative		s		x				h
Semivowel			j		w			

Consonants of Eastern Mono
	Bilabial	Coronal	Palatal	Velar		Glottal
	Bilabial	Coronal	Palatal	plain	lab.	Glottal
Nasal	m	n		ŋ	ŋʷ	
Plosive	p	t		k	kʷ	ʔ
Affricate		ts	tʃ			
Fricative		s				h
Semivowel			j		w	

- Geminated sounds of plosives, nasals and fricatives are also evenly distributed.

=== Suprasegmental ===
Lamb (1958) also described four suprasegmental features that he ascribed phonemic status.

== Morphology ==
Mono is an agglutinative language, in which words use suffix complexes for a variety of purposes with several morphemes strung together.

== See also ==
- Mono traditional narratives
