= Tehachapi =

Tehachapi may refer to:

- Tehachapi, California in the Tehachapi Mountains
  - California Correctional Institution, colloquially referred to as "Tehachapi"
  - Tehachapi High School in Tehachapi, California
  - Tehachapi Unified School District, based in Tehachapi, California
- Tehachapi Mountains surrounding Tehachapi, California, and often considered the southern boundary of Central California
- Tehachapi Municipal Airport (KTSP) in Tehachapi, California
- Tehachapi News, based in Tehachapi, California
- Tehachapi Pass in the Tehachapi Mountains
  - Tehachapi Loop, the railroad engineering feat enabling trains to traverse the Tehachapi Pass
- Tehachapi Pass Wind Farm, one of the largest wind farms in California
- Tehachapi Energy Storage Project, At the time of commissioning in 2014, it was the largest lithium-ion battery system operating in North America and one of the largest in the world
- Tehachapi Tribe, an Indian tribe best remembered for the 1863 Keyesville Massacre in which 53 men from the tribe were killed in Keyesville, California
- The Tempest from Tehachapi, a massive 1977 duststorm bearing Coccidioidomycosis

In popular culture

- Tehachapi, a 1995 Christina Applegate movie, later retitled Across the Moon
- Endurance Tehachapi, the fourth season of the Survivor-like reality program featuring teenagers
