= John William Kelley =

American serial killer and rapist

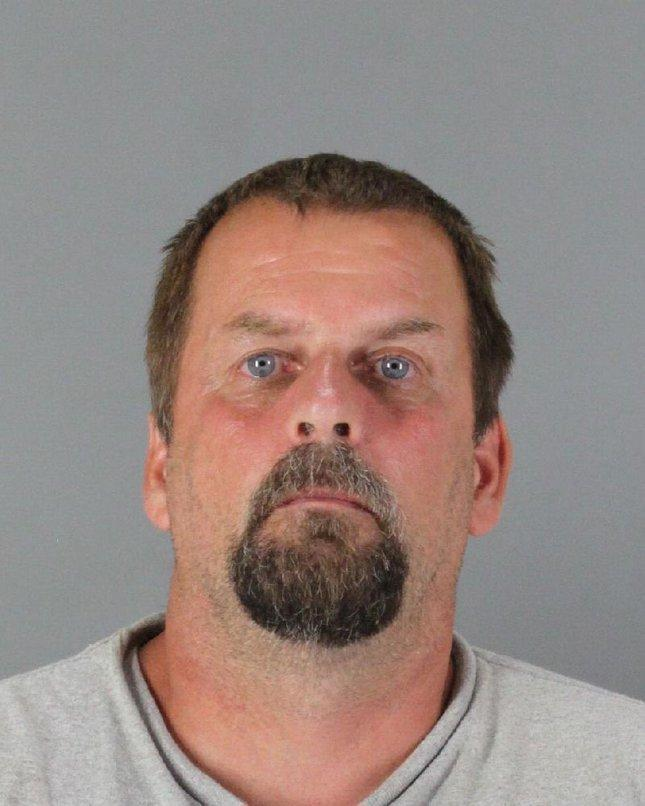
- Mugshot
- Born: March 9, 1963 (age 63); Placerville, California, U.S.
- Convictions: First degree murder with special circumstances (3 counts); Statutory rape; Sexual battery; Rape
- Penalty: 3 Life sentences without the possibility of parole

Details
- Victims: 3
- Span of crimes: 1986–1988
- Country: United States
- State: California
- Date apprehended: August 15, 2012
- Imprisoned at: California Correctional Institution, Tehachapi, California

John William Kelley (born March 9, 1963) is an American serial killer and rapist. Following his 2012 arrest for the 1986 rape-murder of a hitchhiker in Ben Lomond, California, Kelley additionally confessed to murdering a couple two years later in Jedediah Smith Redwoods State Park, near Crescent City. For all of his crimes, he received three life imprisonment terms, which he is serving at the California Correctional Institution.

== Sex crimes ==
In September 1986, Kelley was convicted of statutory rape in rural Santa Clara County, for which he spent 90 days in jail and three years of probation. After he was let go, he married and settled in Ben Lomond.

Years later, in May 1995, he was arrested for rape again in Eureka. He had offered a ride to an acquaintance who needed to run some errands, but at one point, they stopped at his house, where he proceeded to rape her. For this, Kelley was jailed for six years, and was required to register as a sex offender.

== Murders ==
=== Annette Thur ===
Annette Kulovitz, who went by her stepfather's name of Thur, was a 16-year-old who lived with her boyfriend and his family in Ben Lomond. Although smart and friendly, she had a history of running away and avoided returning to her parents, who had opted to relocate to Fort Wayne, Indiana because of cheaper living costs. However, Annette decided to stay at Ben Lomond. On December 6, 1986, after attending a party in Boulder Creek, Thur wanted to hitchhike her way back home, and was picked up by Kelley early in the morning. Kelley then drove her to his house in Ben Lomond, where he raped, sodomized and finally strangled the girl to death. In order to get rid of her body, he dumped her on an embankment along the Skyline Boulevard, where her corpse was soon found by a tourist admiring the scenery.

Initially, the police considered that Annette Kulovitz had died from a drug overdose, and that her friends had discarded her body to avoid getting into trouble. That theory was later ruled out. However, with a lack of viable suspects, the case went cold.

=== Douglas and Rozina Anderson ===
On August 14, 1988, married couple Douglas Neal Anderson, 26, and his wife, Rozina Anne, 31, left their home in Lake Oswego, Oregon to camp out in northern California. They were camping at the Jedediah Smith Redwoods State Park, when Kelley came across the couple. Kelley began banging on their parked van, trying to get the couple to exit the vehicle. When the couple opened the doors to try to reason with Kelley, he forced Douglas to strip naked, and shot him three times. Kelley then forced Rozina to undress, raped her, then shot and killed her before fleeing. Not long after, a tourist noticed that the couple's black Cocker Spaniel was tied up outside the van, and after deciding to check on it, found that the vehicle had been riddled with bullet holes and a foul odor came from it.

Like the Thur case, the double murder went cold quickly, as robbery was disregarded as a motive and no suspects emerged. The killing shocked the small community, which had a low homicide rate.

== Trial and imprisonment ==
In 2012, after being granted funds by federal agents, the crime lab in San Mateo County decided to run the DNA of Annette Thur's killer through CODIS, which matched that of John William Kelley, a convicted rapist who lived in Placerville. Agents were dispatched to interview him, and in the end, he was arrested and charged with killing Annette Thur. Later on, at his trial, Kelley pleaded no contest, and was sentenced to life imprisonment without parole.

While in jail, he surprised investigators by confessing to two more murders: the August 1988 slayings of the Anderson couple. Kelley explained the crime in great detail, providing information only the perpetrator could have known. He was extradited to Del Norte County, where he would later be convicted again and sentenced to two more life imprisonment terms. He is housed at the California Correctional Institution in Tehachapi.

== See also ==
- List of serial killers in the United States
