= Williamsburg, California =

Williamsburg, California may refer to:

- Kernville (former town), California
- Old Town, Kern County, California
