= Tehachapi High School =

Location
- 801 S. Dennison Road; Tehachapi, California 93561; 35.122276°N 118.433326°W

Information
- Type: Public school
- Motto: Home of the Warriors
- School district: Tehachapi Unified School District
- Principal: Cristina Libatique
- Teaching staff: 55.88 (FTE)
- Grades: 9-12
- Enrollment: 1,260 (2024–2025)
- Student to teacher ratio: 22.55 (FTE)
- Colors: Green and Black
- Athletics conference: CIF Central Section; South Yosemite Mountain League
- Nickname: Warriors
- Information: (661) 822-2130
- Website: https://ths.tehachapiusd.com/

== History ==
Tehachapi High School is the single comprehensive high school serving students in grades 9–12 in the Tehachapi, California area.

Tehachapi High School is part of the Tehachapi Unified School District, a K-12 school district. Tehachapi High School has a current enrollment of 1,200-plus, with district enrollment of approximately 4,000.

The high school was founded circa 1928. Classes were held in a home originally built by Russell Peery in the 1890s in Cummings Valley. The house was dismantled and moved to Tehachapi where it served as the high school until the original high school buildings could be completed.

== Modernization ==
The current campus was opened in 2003 after the community passed a $1.5 million bond in 1999 for the purpose of building a new high school. It is divided into wings with an open plan. The design originated with a Central Valley school without the Tehachapi Valley's wind in mind. When the school first opened, students were injured by the wind slamming doors open and shut, requiring changes to the doors' construction.

The gym and cafeteria

The gym and cafeteria underwent major transformations to give it a cafe-like feel with bar stools, booths, and individual seating to accommodate nearly 1,700 students using funds that could not be used to pay staff or for educational purposes.

Measure D

On the November 3rd, 2026 ballot, Tehachapi Unified School District (TUSD) proposed a $61 million dollar general obligation bond that would:

- Modernization of classrooms (fire alarm systems, HVAC systems)
- Start Phase 1 of the Tehachapi High School Performing Arts Center
- Construction of an on-site athletic stadium for football, soccer, and graduation purposes

The securing of the local bond also would result in the State of California unlocking approximately $22.4 million dollars in matching funds. Oversight of the bond money would have been conducted by an oversight committee consisting of Tehachapi citizens and a separate CPA whose sole responsibility would have been to audit the Measure. Fifty-five percent of registered voters were needed to approve the Measure. This percentage was not obtained and the bond failed to be approved by a vote of 53.06% No to 46.94% Yes.
