= Joseph Danks =

Convicted American serial killer (born 1962)

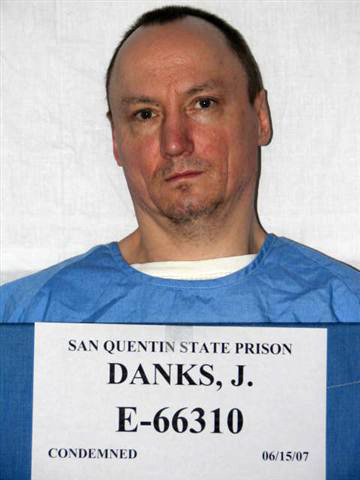
- Born: Joseph Martin Danks; June 17, 1962 (age 64); Bay City, Michigan, U.S.
- Other name: "The Koreatown Slasher"
- Status: Incarcerated
- Motive: Hatred of homeless people
- Convictions: First degree murder with special circumstances First degree murder (6 counts)
- Penalty: Life imprisonment with the possibility of parole after 156 years (1988); Death (1993)

Details
- Victims: 7–8
- Date: December 25, 1986–January 20, 1987; 1990
- Country: United States
- State: California
- Locations: Santa Monica and Koreatown, Los Angeles, California
- Imprisoned at: San Quentin State Prison

Joseph Martin Danks (born June 17, 1962), known as The Koreatown Slasher, is an American spree killer and serial killer who killed six homeless men in January 1987 in Los Angeles' Koreatown neighborhood. Convicted of the six killings and sent to serve his life sentence at the California Correctional Institution in Tehachapi, he was sentenced to death in 1990 for the murder of his cellmate, 67-year-old Walter Holt.

== Biography ==
Danks was born on June 17, 1962, in Bay City, Michigan. His birth resulted from an intimate relationship between 42-year-old Edward White, the son of a successful entrepreneur, and his 17-year-old nanny Karen. Despite the White family being well-off financially and living in a prestigious area of the city, Edward's older children - Joseph's half-brothers, one of whom, Earl, was a schizophrenic - grew up impoverished since their father was drug-addicted alcoholic suffering from memory loss. Joseph's mother also drank alcohol while pregnant, resulting in his premature birth two months earlier, with the baby weighing only two kilograms and having to spend four weeks in an incubator. After he was born, Joseph's parents continued to abuse alcohol, leaving his older half-sister and the housekeeper looked after him. According to the housekeeper, his mother was in a constant state of duress due to the baby's whining, actively trying to avoid it; on at least two occasions, the housekeeper found the crying Joseph locked up in a drawer. It has been alleged that both of Joseph's parents were seen giving him sedatives to make him sleep most of the day, but his mother denied the claim. In early 1964, Edward beat up his wife and broke her nose, causing Karen to leave with her child.

A year later, Karen met Leroy Danks, whom she married in 1966, with Leroy formally adopting Joseph. After that, the family left the state and moved to South Dakota, before moving to live in Wyoming seven months later. During this period, two more boys were born. After the second child's birth, the couple began arguing, leading to Leroy abandoning the family in December 1970 and Joseph's mother remarrying Jean Walls. In 1976, Danks returned to Bay City with his mother and stepfather, whereupon he got back into contact with his biological father and two half-brothers, Michael and Peter. By that time, the debt-ridden Edward White had lost his home and income because of his lifestyle, because of which the family lived in a trailer, using various substances such as marijuana, LSD and phencyclidine and living off of thefts. In 1977, Danks suffered two traffic accidents within several months, suffering an injury to the head in one. While rehabilitated successfully, he began to show signs of mental illness upon release. A year later, Joseph was arrested on charges of drug possession while in Mexico, but was only punished with an administrative fine. Upon learning of this, his father forbade him from entering the trailer or communicating with his half-brothers. Later on, both Michael and Peter would be arrested and sentenced for drug trafficking.

The year after, Danks dropped out of school, left home for several months, and became a vagrant, hitchhiking from various cities to neighboring states. During this period, his mental state deteriorated rapidly, showing signs of hypochondriasis and clinical delirium: he constantly moved furniture around the house and deliberately short-circuited the electrical wiring in his home, claiming that he was being watched from the TV. He accused his mother and other relatives of trying to poison him, and refused to eat any food prepared in the house, and washed the dishes several times a day before consuming the food placed on them. Danks also seemingly suffered from auditory hallucinations, as he claimed that he had been in contact with his deceased grandparents. He refused any medical help, claiming that drug addiction was something normal in society, as he was convinced that President Ronald Reagan smoked 10,000 "weeds" a day. Being jobless, Danks lived off money provided by his mother, whom he believed was engaged in printing counterfeit money with his aunt, which he threatened to expose to the police. In his free time, Danks associated with local homeless people, and with time, stopped taking care of his physical appearance, becoming untidy and unclean.

In October 1982, Danks showed up at a New Jersey elementary school with torn clothes, for which he was taken to the police station. Upon returning to Michigan, he again complained of having visions. He committed several petty offenses, for which he was forcibly confined to a mental hospital; he escaped two weeks later. A few days after his flight, he was found in Florida and returned to the facility, where he received treatment until early 1984. Danks was released at the end of his treatment and returned home to his mother. At this time, his stepfather, Leroy Danks, who worked as a truck driver, offered him a job to rekindle his relationship with his stepson. However, beginning in 1985, Joseph's mental state began to deteriorate again, with him displaying misanthropic characteristics, refusing to visit any fast food restaurants or other public places with his stepfather, demanding that food be brought to him in the truck, and also claiming that an unidentified malevolent entity was chasing him. After a while, Danks left his stepfather and again began hitching around the country. In 1986, he went to his half-brother, Peter, with whom he lived for several weeks. However, after his release from prison two years prior, Peter had become a Jehovah's Witness, had married, and ceased any criminal activities, resulting in quarrels between the two and Joseph's eventual departure.

In June 1986, Danks was arrested for illegally possessing a sawed-off shotgun. While imprisoned in the county jail, he displayed signs of OCD, constantly maintaining cleanliness in his cell and cleaning and washing his belongings several times a day. In September, he pled guilty to attempted theft, for which he received a lenient sentence of five years probation. After his release, Danks once again left Michigan and at the end of 1986 resurfaced in Los Angeles, California.

== Murders ==
Following his arrival in Los Angeles, Danks began killing homeless men in the Koreatown neighborhood by stabbing them in the back with great force. The first death was 40-year-old Christopher Michael Forsblade, whom Danks stabbed to death on January 6 on Vermont Avenue. Eight days later, Danks committed a double murder, first stabbing 58-year-old Isaac Davis on South Menlo Avenue and then, less than three hours later, attacking 55-year-old John Charles Coble on West 9th Street, inflicting several stabs with the knife, killing him. Two days later, Danks killed again, stabbing a homeless man on West 8th. The man, believed to be around 43, has never been identified. The day after, he attacked 64-year-old Almond Lord on South Kenmore Avenue, who fiercely resisted and caused his assailant to flee. Lord survived the ordeal and, during the investigation, gave the police a description of the man's appearance, which was used to develop a facial composite. On January 20, Danks attempted to kill 58-year-old James Lyons at Manhattan Place, who was stabbed but survived.

A few hours after the attempted murder of Lyons, Danks killed another homeless man in his 50s on South Western Avenue, whose identity was never established. During the last murder, Danks was seen by a witness who ran after him for five blocks before calling the police. On the morning of January 20, Danks was cornered in an alley by police, after which he surrendered without resistance. Before being arrested, he wrapped the murder weapon, a kitchen knife, in a newspaper and attempted to get rid of it by throwing it away, but it was found during a search. Once at the police station, Danks renounced his Miranda rights and confessed to the six killings in a recorded confession. His arrest was announced at a press conference held by Police Chief Daryl Gates. In addition to his confessions, the main evidence incriminating Danks in the killings was his knife, the width, and the length of the blade, which coincided with the depths and wounds of the victims. Following this, 34-year-old Christopher John Riegel, who had been considered the main suspect until Danks' arrest, was released from custody.

During his interrogation at Parker Center, Danks claimed that he had stabbed to death a homeless man named Edwin Trujillo in Santa Monica in a fit of anger on Christmas Day, after he was not allowed to sleep in a homeless shelter due to overcrowding. The police were unable to substantiate whether such an incident had occurred. According to Danks' statement, his motive for the murders was a personal enmity towards those whom he considered "dirty, filthy bums".

== First trial ==
In March 1988, Joseph Danks was asked by the prosecutor's office to accept a plea deal, but he refused. During his trial, he was kept in the Men's Central County Jail, where he displayed signs of paranoia and a tendency to espouse conspiracy theories surrounding his detainment: he complained that his prison food was poisoned and was confident that actor Burt Reynolds and TV host Johnny Carson were with him in the jail cell, defecating in his food. He accused the administration of psychologically manipulating him through music broadcast on the prison camera. He constantly kept his cell tidy, brushing his teeth on average six to ten times daily. In one of the court hearings, he attacked his lawyer Larry Rivetz with a makeshift knife made from a toothbrush and razorblades, inflicting a superficial wound on him. In December of that year, on the advice of his lawyer, he accepted a plea deal in exchange for the removal of the death sentence On December 23, 1988, he was convicted of the six murders and sentenced to life imprisonment with a chance of parole after 156 years.

Due to his worsening mental health, Danks was transferred to Atascadero State Hospital, where he remained from June 1989 to March 1990. While housed there, he was diagnosed with paranoid schizophrenia and antisocial personality disorder following a psychiatric evaluation. When he took an IQ test, he scored a total of 106 points. Danks also underwent a neurological examination for a suspected cyst in his brain; however, no such thing was found. After undergoing treatment, his mental state improved, and he was transferred out of the hospital on August 23, 1990, to serve his life sentence at the California Correctional Institution in Tehachapi.

== Murder of Walter Holt and second trial ==
At about 1 AM on September 21, 1990, Danks attracted the attention of a prison guard by claiming that he had killed his cellmate. While inspecting his cell, authorities found the body of 67-year-old Walter Holt. Early that same morning, while being interviewed, Danks stated that he had strangled Holt with a rope made from a sheet, just three hours after he had been placed in his cell and Holt had fallen asleep. His reason for the killing was that until now, he had a cell solely for himself. He feigned insanity, claiming that voices of divine origin had ordered him to kill the man, but this claim was not believed, and he was charged with first-degree murder. While awaiting trial, he remained in the Institution, where he continued to commit crimes: on November 12, 1991, a correctional officer searched through his cell and found a sharp plastic shank, about five inches long, hidden in the mattress of his bunk. On January 23, 1992, correctional officer Albert Carter conducted strip searches on several inmates, one of whom was Joseph Danks. During the search, Carter forced the prisoners to undress, and when he removed the handcuffs from Danks and another prisoner, Renaldo Navarez, Danks stabbed Navarez in the head with a piece of metal.

On January 26, 1992, another correctional officer, James Lundy, noticed smoke coming out of Danks' cell. He took the prisoner out and extinguished the fire, which Danks had lit up with papers and newspapers he had been collecting. On April 17, correctional officer Monte Gould searched Danks' cell and found another plastic shank hidden inside, and on May 12, yet another, shorter shank was found in his bunk. On July 12, at lunchtime, Danks attacked one of the guards, David Goodman, hitting him and trying to splash a cup of hot coffee on his face. In early 1993, Danks' trial for the murder of Holt began. At one of the court sessions, he attacked one of his lawyers, stabbing him with a sharpened piece of wire which he had been able to carry into the courtroom. On April 2, 1993, Joseph Danks pleaded guilty to the murder; he was sentenced to death. In his final statement, Danks expressed no remorse for his actions, claiming that he was "doing God's work" when he killed the elderly man. He also threatened the judge and prosecutors and told members of the jury that he openly welcomed being executed.

== Aftermath ==
Following his verdict, Joseph Danks was transferred to San Quentin State Prison's death row, where he remains. Over time, his mental health deteriorated, as he frequently complained about hallucinations and pain caused by rats, no traces of which were found in his cell. He also suffered from insomnia, screaming at night and keeping other inmates awake, and frequently attacked prison guards, whom he doused in his urine. Despite his erratic behavior, Danks was untreated until 2011. In 2004, his lawyers drew up an appeal to overturn his death sentence and asked for a retrial because two of the jurors at his second trial in 1993 had sought advice from clergy members of their parish. The appeal was dismissed. In 2012, his family hired lawyers to appeal against Danks' death penalty, asking that it be replaced with medical treatment for his insanity, but the final decision on this appeal has not been made yet.

On March 13, 2019, the Governor of California, Gavin Newsom, ordered a moratorium on the death penalty in the state, which dismantled the chambers at San Quentin indefinitely.

As of March 2025, Danks remains incarcerated at San Quentin State Prison.

== See also ==
- List of death row inmates in the United States
- List of serial killers in the United States
