= Monroe High School (Tehachapi) =

Coordinates: 35.131351°N 118.43852°W

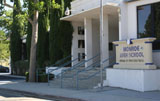
- 801 Dennison Rd. Tehachapi, CA

Information
- Type: Public
- Motto: Home of the Panthers
- School district: Tehachapi Unified School District
- Principal: Cristina Libatique
- Grades: 9–12
- Enrollment: 38 (2023–2024)
- Color: Blue
- Mascot: Panther
- Information: (661) 822-2124
- Website: Monroe High School

Monroe High School is the main continuation high school that is located just outside Tehachapi, California. Monroe has one principal, a secretary and office clerk, two part-time counselors and three full-time teachers. The school is also the site of the Monroe Independent Study Center (formerly Summit Independent Study Center), and Tehachapi Adult School. Monroe is part of the Tehachapi Unified School District. After the 2010–2011 school year, the district plans on moving Monroe High School to the former junior high school building.

== About ==
Monroe High School is for teens who are having educational and behavior problems and cannot be in regular school. The school offers:

- smaller class sizes (average 21:1 pupil–teacher ratio)
- personalized assistance from teachers
- individualized course of study designed to help you graduate on time (or earlier)
- opportunities to gain work experience prior to finishing high school.

== Former Monroe Site ==
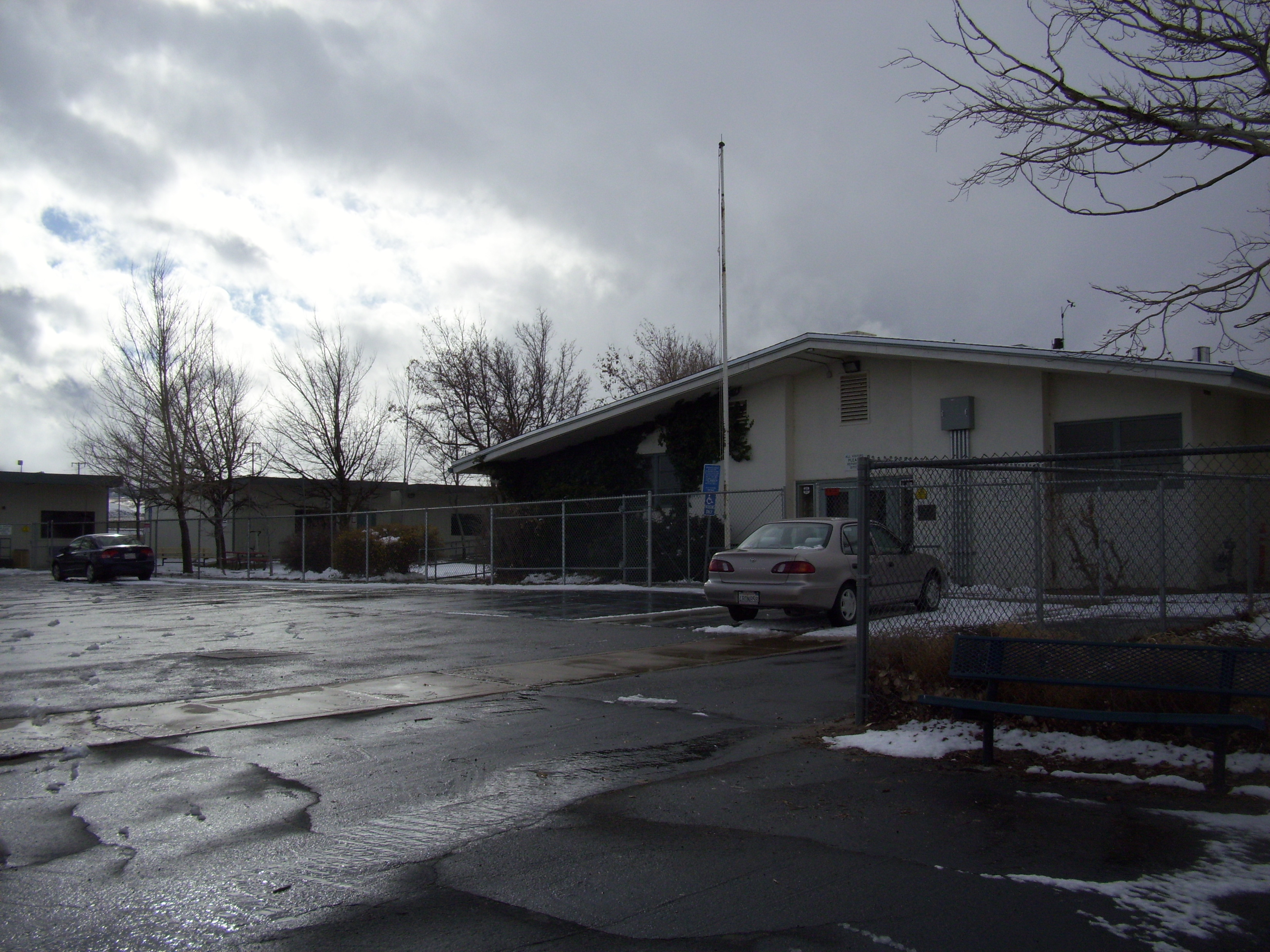
