= Cummings Valley =

Valley in California

Coordinates: 35.11°N 118.60°W

Cummings Valley is in California's Tehachapi Mountains.

Cummings Valley was settled by the Kawaiisu people before the arrival of white Americans, largely of Irish origin (Note: Among these Irish immigrants was John Hickey who was Cummings Valley's first school teacher and would later become Tehachapi's second mayor.), in the 1850s. The region's agriculture began with livestock and dry farming as water was not imported until 1973. This water consists of 20,000 acre-feet of water annually from the State Water Project pumped 3,425 vertical feet from the Grapevine area. These imports, including their use to recharge the natural water basin have been impacted by the ongoing climate-change-caused megadrought.

Agriculture remains a large part of the Cummings Valley economy, including greenhouses and vineyards.

Stallion Springs and the California Correctional Institution are both located in Cummings Valley.

The dominant geographical feature in Cummings Valley is Cummings Mountain to the southeast. Many portions of the valley retain their valley oak-dominated, natural savannah state. Other oaks in Cummings Valley include black oaks.
