= Stallion Springs, California =

Stallion Springs
- Unincorporated Community; Census Designated Place
- the entrance to the town

- Location in Kern County and the state of California

- Location in the United States
- Coordinates: 35°05′20″N 118°38′33″W
- Country: United States
- State: California
- County: Kern

Government
  - Senate: Shannon Grove (R)
  - Assembly: Stan Ellis (R)
  - U. S. Congress: Vince Fong (R)

Area
  - Total: 13.601 sq mi (35.226 km^{2})
  - Land: 13.577 sq mi (35.163 km^{2})
  - Water: 0.024 sq mi (0.063 km^{2}) 0.18%
- Elevation: 3,783 ft (1,153 m)

Population (2020)
  - Total: 3,139
  - Density: 231.2/sq mi (89.27/km^{2})
- Time zone: UTC-8 (PST)
  - Summer (DST): UTC-7 (PDT)
- ZIP code: 93561
- Area code: 661
- FIPS code: 06-73868
- GNIS feature ID: 1853417

Stallion Springs is a census-designated place (CDP) in the Tehachapi Mountains, in Kern County, California, United States. The population was 3,139 at the 2020 census, up from 2,488 at the 2010 census. Stallion Springs is located in Cummings Valley, within the Greater Tehachapi area.

== Geography ==
According to the United States Census Bureau, the CDP has a total area of 13.6 square miles (35 km^{2}), of which 13.6 square miles (35 km^{2}) is land and 0.024 square miles (0.062 km^{2}) (0.18%) is water.

== Law enforcement ==
The area is patrolled by the Stallion Springs Police Department which was established in 1972. The Stallion Springs Police Department is a California Peace Officer Standards and Training fully certified department. They provide the community and the surrounding schools, drug intervention classes, social media safety classes, and gang information classes. They also have a Neighborhood Watch Program. The Citizen Services Unit, established in 2014, assists the police department with administrative duties and some patrol activities.

== Demographics ==
Historical population
Census	Pop.	Note	%±
2000	1,522		—
2010	2,488		63.5%
2020	3,139		26.2%
U.S. Decennial Census; 1860–1870 1880-1890; 1900 1910 1920; 1930 1940 1950; 1960 1970 1980; 1990 2000 2010; 2020

Stallion Springs first appeared as a census designated place in the 2000 U.S. census.

=== Racial and ethnic composition ===
Stallion Springs CDP, California – Racial and ethnic composition Note: the US Census treats Hispanic/Latino as an ethnic category. This table excludes Latinos from the racial categories and assigns them to a separate category. Hispanics/Latinos may be of any race.
Race / Ethnicity (NH = Non-Hispanic)	Pop 2000	Pop 2010	Pop 2020	% 2000	% 2010	% 2020
White alone (NH)	1,260	2,062	2,334	82.79%	82.88%	74.35%
Black or African American alone (NH)	14	30	29	0.92%	1.21%	0.92%
Native American or Alaska Native alone (NH)	11	13	23	0.72%	0.52%	0.73%
Asian alone (NH)	16	32	51	1.05%	1.29%	1.62%
Native Hawaiian or Pacific Islander alone (NH)	1	7	2	0.07%	0.28%	0.06%
Other race alone (NH)	4	6	18	0.26%	0.24%	0.57%
Mixed race or Multiracial (NH)	48	53	165	3.15%	2.13%	5.26%
Hispanic or Latino (any race)	168	285	517	11.04%	11.45%	16.47%
Total	1,522	2,488	3,139	100.00%	100.00%	100.00%

=== 2020 census ===
As of the 2020 census, Stallion Springs had a population of 3,139 and a population density of 231.2 inhabitants per square mile (89.3/km^{2}).

The whole population lived in households. The median age was 45.5 years; 22.3% of residents were under the age of 18 and 21.7% were 65 years of age or older. The age distribution was 5.2% aged 18 to 24, 21.5% aged 25 to 44, and 29.4% aged 45 to 64. For every 100 females, there were 98.9 males, and for every 100 females age 18 and over, there were 96.5 males age 18 and over.

0.0% of residents lived in urban areas, while 100.0% lived in rural areas.

There were 1,210 households, out of which 28.4% included children under the age of 18, 66.7% were married-couple households, 4.3% were cohabiting couple households, 16.5% had a female householder with no spouse or partner present, and 12.5% had a male householder with no spouse or partner present. 21.0% of households were one person, and 10.3% were one person aged 65 or older. The average household size was 2.59. There were 914 families (75.5% of all households).

There were 1,315 housing units at an average density of 96.9 units per square mile (37.4 units/km^{2}), of which 8.0% were vacant. The homeowner vacancy rate was 0.6% and the rental vacancy rate was 9.0%. Of the occupied units, 89.9% were owner-occupied and 10.1% were occupied by renters.

=== Income and poverty ===
In 2023, the US Census Bureau estimated that the median household income was $83,590, and the per capita income was $46,813. About 0.0% of families and 4.2% of the population were below the poverty line.

=== 2010 census ===
At the 2010 census Stallion Springs had a population of 2,488. The population density was 151.2 inhabitants per square mile (58.4/km^{2}). The racial makeup of Stallion Springs was 2,239 (90.0%) White, 30 (1.2%) African American, 26 (1.0%) Native American, 32 (1.3%) Asian, 7 (0.3%) Pacific Islander, 79 (3.2%) from other races, and 75 (3.0%) from two or more races. Hispanic or Latino of any race were 285 people (11.5%).

The whole population lived in households, no one lived in non-institutionalized group quarters and no one was institutionalized.

There were 1,004 households, 275 (27.4%) had children under the age of 18 living in them, 657 (65.4%) were opposite-sex married couples living together, 58 (5.8%) had a female householder with no husband present, 42 (4.2%) had a male householder with no wife present. There were 48 (4.8%) unmarried opposite-sex partnerships, and 8 (0.8%) same-sex married couples or partnerships. 194 households (19.3%) were one person and 87 (8.7%) had someone living alone who was 65 or older. The average household size was 2.48. There were 757 families (75.4% of households); the average family size was 2.84.

The age distribution was 522 people (21.0%) under the age of 18, 141 people (5.7%) aged 18 to 24, 510 people (20.5%) aged 25 to 44, 801 people (32.2%) aged 45 to 64, and 514 people (20.7%) who were 65 or older. The median age was 46.7 years. For every 100 females, there were 95.8 males. For every 100 females age 18 and over, there were 96.4 males.

There were 1,204 housing units at an average density of 73.2 per square mile, of the occupied units 862 (85.9%) were owner-occupied and 142 (14.1%) were rented. The homeowner vacancy rate was 5.4%; the rental vacancy rate was 10.0%. 2,056 people (82.6% of the population) lived in owner-occupied housing units and 432 people (17.4%) lived in rental housing units.
