= Haakapainiži =

Spirit or ogre in Kawaiisu folklore

Haakapainiži (or Aatakapitsi in Chemehuevi) is a spirit or ogre from Kawaiisu folklore, taking the appearances of a giant grasshopper with two canes and a basket on his back, an old man, or a swarm of grasshoppers. Haakapainiži sings to children and talks sweetly to them, putting them in his basket when their guard is down and taking them back to his lair to eat.
