= Mountain Valley Airport =

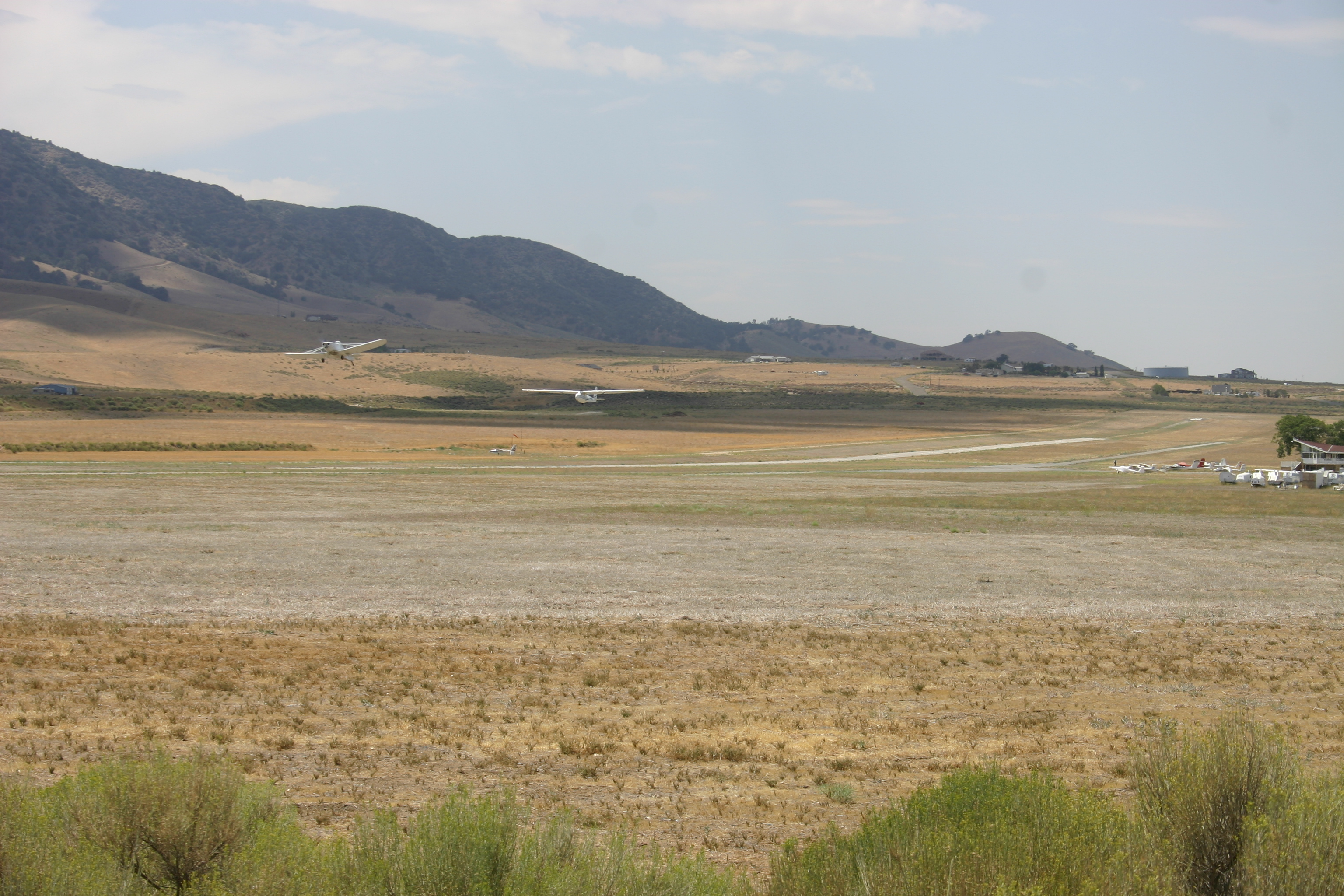
- Tow plane and glider taking off
- IATA: none; ICAO: none; FAA LID: L94

Summary
- Airport type: Public use
- Owner: Larry G. Barrett
- Serves: Tehachapi, California
- Elevation AMSL: 4,220 ft (1,290 m)
- Coordinates: 35°06′04″N 118°25′23″W

Map
- Location within California Location within southern California

Runways
| Direction | Length | | Surface |
| Direction | ft | m | Surface |
|---|---|---|---|
| 9L/27R | 4,890 | 1,490 | Asphalt/dirt |
| 9R/27L | 4,890 | 1,490 | Asphalt/dirt |

Statistics (2023)
- Aircraft operations (year ending 5/24/2023): 51,570
- Based aircraft: 98
- Source: Federal Aviation Administration

Mountain Valley Airport (FAA LID: L94) is a privately owned public-use airport located two nautical miles (4 km) southeast of the central business district of Tehachapi, in Kern County, California, United States.

The airport is used for glider operations and training. It was established for its close proximity to various advantageous lift effects for soaring where the Sierra Nevada, Tehachapi Mountains and the Mojave Desert meet.

The Skylark North Glider School performs glider flight training for civilians as well as for the US Air Force Test Pilot School (from Edwards AFB), the National Test Pilot School (from the Mojave Air & Space Port), NASA and others. Due to the ongoing training contract with the US Air Force Test Pilot School, most NASA Space Shuttle pilots who came from the Air Force have probably received glider training at Mountain Valley Airport.

== Facilities and aircraft ==
Mountain Valley Airport covers an area of 170 acres (69 ha) at an elevation of 4,220 feet (1,286 m) above mean sea level. It has two runways designated 9L/27R and 9R/27L, each with an asphalt and dirt surface measuring 4,890 by 36 feet (1,490 x 11 m).

For the 12-month period ending May 24, 2023, the airport had 51,570 aircraft operations, an average of 141 per day: 97% general aviation and 2% military. At that time there were 98 aircraft based at this airport: 80 glider and 18 single-engine.

There is a sandwich shop and an RV park & campground on the field. The nearest fuel sales are at Tehachapi Municipal Airport two miles to the north.

== See also ==
- Orographic lift
- Convergence zone
- Mountain wave
- List of airports in Kern County, California
