= Kawaiisu traditional narratives =

Kawaiisu traditional narratives include myths, legends, tales, and oral histories preserved by the Kawaiisu people of the Tehachapi Mountains, southern Sierra Nevada, and western Mojave Desert of southern California including the Coso Range.

Kawaiisu oral literature has been documented by Maurice Zigmond. These narratives show their closest links with the traditions of other Numic-speaking groups of the Great Basin. (See also Traditional narratives (Native California).)
