= Inez Brown Burns =

American abortion provider

Inez Brown Burns (1886-1976) was an illegal abortion provider and socialite in San Francisco. She created an extensive West Coast abortion network in the United States, which catered to a range of clients in the early 20th century. It is estimated that her clinic provided about 50,000 abortions in San Francisco and about 150,000 abortions total. In her lifetime, Burns was widely covered in the press, due to her socially unconventional lifestyle, legal troubles, and occupation as an abortion provider in the pre-Roe v. Wade era.

== Early life ==
On September 5, 1886, Inez Brown Burns (née Ingenthron) was born. The accounts of her birthplace vary, with some sources claiming that she was born in a two-bedroom cardboard shack in the outskirts of Philadelphia, while others say that she was born in San Francisco. According to her biographer, Burns was truly born in a tenement building in the South of Market district of San Francisco. The Philadelphia story was merely a legend told by Burns. At the time, the South of Market neighborhood was comparable to Hell's Kitchen in New York City, due to its gritty warehouses, street gangs, and cramped living spaces.

Her parents were Alice Bell Cross, an American, and Fredrick Ingenthron (b. 1853), a poor German immigrant. Her father, originally from Traunstein, was a cigar maker and an alcoholic. The couple had met in Indiana and lived in Chicago before moving to San Francisco. In 1894, Frederick died, leaving Alice to raise four children as a single parent. Burns had a difficult childhood, and she was forced to leave school at 5 years old in order to work at a pickle factory. Burns taught herself to read, due to her lack of formal schooling.

== Early work ==
As a teenager, Burns found a job as a manicurist at the Palace Hotel. She was admired by many male guests of the hotel, who often sought her services, including Eugene West, a full-time abortion care provider. At the time, West was a "lady's man," according to historians, and three times the age of Burns. He and Burns became lovers, and he reportedly performed some abortions on her. He eventually offered her a job at his abortion clinic, and she worked by his side for years.

In early 20th century, there were strict birth control laws in the United States, resulting in many unintended pregnancies. Furthermore, abortion was illegal, and it was a felony to provide abortion services. In 1872, San Francisco had even adopted an anti-abortion statute. However, a large underground economy of abortion providers existed, which was primarily marketed through word-of-mouth. The doctors, midwives, and specialists who performed underground abortions were rarely arrested, unless the pregnant woman died during the procedure. As a result, underground abortion services were fairly common at the time.

At that time, many abortion providers were undertrained, under-equipped, or worked in unhygienic conditions. This led to many abortion-related injuries and deaths.Similarly, West was not without scandal. In 1902, he was charged with dismemberment, after he had thrown the body of a dead patient into the San Francisco Bay. He claimed that he had tried to save the patient from a botched abortion performed by another doctor, and he had been unsuccessful. Furthermore, West had other court appearances, due to malpractice. As written by Riggin, his "incompetence and malpractice routinely kept him in the courtroom."

Following her affair with West, Burns began a relationship with George Washington Merritt, a 42-year-old businessman. She became pregnant with a child, while seeing Merritt. It was considered unpleasant and uncomfortable for a pregnant woman to work at an abortion clinic, so Burns then left her job. Before she left, she stole a satchel of medical equipment, as well as bottles of chloroform and quinine, which she took home with her.

The 1906 San Francisco earthquake radically altered the city, as many people lost their professions, homes, or loved ones. During the earthquake, Burns quickly ran out of her apartment, grabbing the medical equipment that she had stolen from West's office. Her home had been destroyed in the earthquake, and she found herself among the homeless who camped out in Golden Gate Park. However, in this environment, Burns found a business opportunity. She began to perform abortions for other campers in the park in Sharon Meadow, and news of her talents soon spread.

Following the devastation of the earthquake, Burns briefly left San Francisco for Pittsburgh. In 1910, she returned to San Francisco on the Southern Pacific Railroad for a new life. By that point, she was mother with two sons, Bobby and George, but she only returned with one of her children (Bobby). When her sister, Nellie, asked about George, Inez said, "I’ll send for George later," although she apparently never did. The boy remained with his father, George Merritt, in Pennsylvania.

== Abortion clinic ==
In San Francisco, Burns quickly became known as a skilled abortion provider. In 1922, she opened her first abortion clinic in a 2-story building, located at 327 Fillmore Street. The clinic had multiple people on staff, including nurses, a blood technician, and a janitor. It was designed to feel pleasant and inviting, with Persian carpets, Chippendale chairs, oil paintings, and crystal chandeliers. The reception room had Burns's business cards in a copper bowl, where she was described as only a "Designer." The clinic had one operating room, which included surgical devices, a bowl, and a basin. Other rooms had beds for recovering patients. The backyard had large, concrete incinerators, where the staff would burn the fetal remains.

Perhaps due to the prior scandals of West, Burns was particularly concerned with health and hygiene. The operating instruments at the clinic were always sterilized and she employed trained anesthetics. When patients left the clinic, they were given detailed instructions for aftercare. If they experienced any complications, the clinic would cover any related costs. Consequently, the clinic had very few problems related to malpractice of complications.

The clinic had various arrangements to address the illegal nature of the work. Trapdoors were installed, in case of police raids, and the clinic paid kickbacks to the San Francisco Police Department (reportedly $400/day by the 1940s), which enabled the clinic to stay open. Burns made sure to have a minimal paper trail. She did not keep detailed records of her appointments, and she carefully stored her money in various safes and compartments rather than in a bank.

The clinic was considered clean, efficient, and discreet, and business quickly grew. An average of 20–30 women were served per day, and they paid between $75 and $200 per abortion. The clients were both wealthy and poor, but Burns barely provided discounts, as she was primarily interested in the financial aspects of the business (rather than political or philosophical reasons). Clients of the clinic included housewives, celebrities, and athletes, and it was common for women to be waiting when Burns opened the doors in the morning. The majority of her clients were married, middle-class and wealthy women, and some did not tell their husbands that they were pregnant and/or that they had sought out abortion services. Hollywood studios sent contract actresses to her clinic, and the Olympic skater Sonja Henie reportedly visited her clinic.

The clinic network eventually spanned the West Coast, with services extending from Seattle to San Diego. At her peak, Burns was making at least $50,000 per month through the clinic. By 1924, Burns was able to purchase a home at 274 Guerrero Street, where she stored much of her cash. That year, she married Charles A. Granelli, a stylish and handsome Italian playboy. Over time, she acquired a range of properties, including a house in Atherton and a 800 acre ranch (known as "Burns Ranch") in La Honda, amidst the Santa Cruz Mountains. Burns drove around in a chauffeured limousine. She hosted famously raucous parties on Wednesday nights, especially at Burns Ranch, which attracted politicians, prostitutes, policemen, and health care professionals. Some attendants of her parties included Pinky Lee, Dwight Fiske, Burl Ives, and a magician named Gali-Gali. During this period, she became a source of social fascination in gossip headlines, particularly due to her flamboyant lifestyle. She eventually left Granelli. In 1932, she married Joseph Burns, a California Assemblyman, who she met at one of her parties. She took his last name.

In 1945, Burns claimed that she made about 1 million dollars per year, but about half of that money went to kickbacks and bribes.

== Raids and legal issues ==
The abortion clinic suffered many police raids during its existence. The first raid was in 1936, when police stormed the Fillmore Street location and arrested a maid and a janitor, whom they called "vagrants." However, the clinic was not shut down and Inez was not arrested. Two years later, in 1938, the clinic was raided again, when a patient had informed the police that Inez had performed an abortion. The police questioned 10 women in the waiting room, and they arrested Burns and Margie Silver, a nurse. A few weeks later, Burns and Silver were released when the police were unable to acquire formal complaints from the clinic's clients. It was repeatedly difficult for the police to find formal evidence and charges for the clinic, as most women did not want to share that they had received an abortion.

In 1939, Burns was charged with tax evasion. She settled it in 1940 by paying a $10,000 fine.

In the following decade, Burns faced some of her greatest legal challenges, when Pat Brown became District Attorney in 1943. He had run a campaign to rid the city of vice and police corruption. A few years later, on September 23, 1945, a young woman had visited San Francisco's Central Emergency Hospital, requesting treatment after a recent abortion. The woman was questioned and it was determined that she had received an abortion at the Fillmore Street clinic. The next day, two undercover police officers were instructed to watch over the location. They found no incriminating evidence or activity, but a police raid was still conducted on September 26 at 9:40am. By the time the police arrived, Burns had fled the flat with her husband, another women, and various documents in a bag. They had driven away in a limousine. With this news, Police Inspector Frank Ahern drove to Inez's home on Guerrero Street, where he discovered $289,217 in cash, and a piece of paper (that Burns reportedly tried to first swallow) that detailed her revenues. The Internal Revenue Service (IRS) was notified and Burns was immediately arrested.

Following the arrest of Burns, the police and legal forced clamped down on the clinic. Yet another raid was conducted, where police found notebooks with extensive financial records. They learned that the clinic had performed about $500,000 worth of abortions in 1944. Then, Burns and seven clinic employees were charged with conspiracy to commit abortion and violation of state medical laws. Burns pled not guilty before a grand jury. The jury members could not agree on her guilt, despite a large amount of evidence supplied by the prosecution.

On September 26, 1946, Burns was convicted of performing illegal abortions. She served two years and seven months at Tehachapi Women's Prison. She later had convictions for tax evasion and served additional prison sentences. In total, Burns paid about $800,000 in back taxes.

== Death ==
Inez spent the final years of her life with her husband, Joe, at a nursing home in Moss Beach, California. She died on January 25, 1976, at 87 years old, and a few years after the Supreme Court legalized abortion in Roe v. Wade (1973). Although she was very wealthy as a middle-aged woman, she was destitute in her old age, most likely due to the multiple tax evasion charges brought against her.
