= Pit Bulls & Parolees =

American reality TV show

- Genre: Reality
- Starring: Tia Maria Torres
- Country of origin: United States
- Original language: English
- No. of seasons: 19
- No. of episodes: 203

Production
- Executive producers: Lisa Lucas; Rasha Drachkouitch
- Producer: Patrick Keegan
- Running time: 42 minutes
- Production company: 44 Blue Productions

Original release
- Network: Animal Planet
- Release: October 30, 2009 – November 22, 2022

Pit Bulls & Parolees is an American reality television series on Animal Planet. The series, which began in 2009, focuses on the Villalobos Rescue Center, a rescue for dogs, specifically pit bull dogs.

The show's mission, stated in voiceover during the show's opening credits by founder Tia Maria Torres, is twofold: to combat misconceptions about pit bulls and other similar dogs (often referred to as "bully breeds"), and to provide employment and a stable transition for recent parolees who are trying to return to society.

Episodes generally feature several stories, and usually include both a dog rescue as well as an adoption. Episodes also feature Tia and her family, including daughters Tania and Mariah, adopted twin sons Kanani and Moe, their wives Lizzy and Mariah (or "M2"), and the parolees who work for the rescue, performing daily care training duties and pit bull rescue missions.

== Background ==
Pit Bulls & Parolees depicts the day-to-day operations at the Villalobos Rescue Center (VRC). Torres started the shelter in Agua Dulce, California. In 2011, the shelter relocated to the Greater New Orleans in Louisiana.

In 2011 Tia Maria Torres had planned to move Villalobos to a small town called Tehachapi, California, around 75 miles north of where it had operated in Agua Dulce. It appeared to be an ideal place for VRC to relocate with the overabundance of pit bulls in Kern County and a prison facility in town, with newly released inmates looking for work.

VRC secured all the proper permits, yet at the final moment Kern County did not grant permission for the rescue to conduct their business in the remote area of Old West Ranch, Tehachapi. Losing all of her personal savings spent on the Tehachapi project and hundreds of man hours, Torres and the VRC were forced to remain at the Agua Dulce location.

As the rules regarding kennel permits were becoming increasingly strict and expensive in Los Angeles County, the rescue announced on November 13, 2011, that they would be moving the facility out of California in order to survive financially. After considering various locations, it was the memories of VRC's rescue efforts during Hurricane Katrina that led the non-profit group to choose Louisiana for their new home. It took almost a year to make the entire move complete.

On January 1, 2012, Torres arrived with the last group of 30 of the total 160 dogs, making the state of Louisiana their sole permanent location. The rescue and adoption facility was located in the Upper 9th Ward of New Orleans, Louisiana, with various other satellite locations scattered throughout southern Louisiana.

On June 15, 2020, it was announced that the sixteenth season would premiere on July 25, 2020.

A 2021 episode illustrated continued damage the main rescue location in New Orleans gets from storms and hurricanes; in that episode, Torres announced that the rescue had secured another property in New Orleans and would be relocating to that property.

While the final season of new episodes was released in 2022, episodes from the show's existing library continue to air on Animal Planet weekdays at 1 PM EST.
