= Tehachapi Unified School District =

School district in California

Address
- 400 South Snyder Tehachapi, California, 93561; United States
- Coordinates: 35°07′39″N 118°26′14″W

District information
- Type: public
- Grades: K-12
- Superintendent: Brian Bell
- School board: School board members
- Enrollment: 4900 grades K-12

Other information
- Elementary Schools: 3
- Alternative Schools: 1
- Middle Schools: 1
- High Schools: 1
- Website: www.tehachapiusd.com

The Tehachapi Unified School District is a school district in the Tehachapi, California area with approximately 4,900 students. Brian Bell is the district's superintendent. Paul Kaminski is President of the Board of Education.

The Tehachapi Unified School District has 6 schools:

- 2 high schools, including an alternative education high school
- 1 middle school
- 3 elementary schools

== Schools ==
=== High school ===
- Tehachapi High School

==== Alternative Education School ====
- Monroe High School

=== Middle school ===
- Jacobsen Middle School

=== Elementary schools ===
- Cummings Valley Elementary School
- Golden Hills Elementary School
- Tompkins Elementary School
