= Tehichipa, California =

Human settlement in the United States

Coordinates: 35.0858°N 118.2085°W

Tehichipa is a former settlement in Kern County, California, United States. It was located on the railroad near Oak Creek Pass and Old Town.

Tehichipa, originally known as Williamsburg, was founded in 1869 by James Williams; while Williams originally named the town for himself, its name was changed to Tehichipa by 1872. The town was a shipping center for Owens Valley gold mines prior to the construction of a railroad in the area. However, when the Southern Pacific Railroad built a railroad in 1876, it bypassed Tehichipa, instead establishing a new town named "Tehachapi Summit". The railroad caused Tehachapi Summit to grow at Tehichipa's expense. Tehachapi Summit evolved into the city of Tehachapi, while Tehichipa ultimately died out. The only surviving building from Tehichipa, the Errea House, is now located in Tehachapi.

A post office operated at Tehichipa from 1869 to 1877, when the service was transferred to Old Town.

== See also ==
- List of ghost towns in California
