= Tehachapi Mountains AVA =

American Viticultural Area in California

Coordinates: 35°05′21″N 118°34′10″W

Tehachapi Mountains
- Wine region
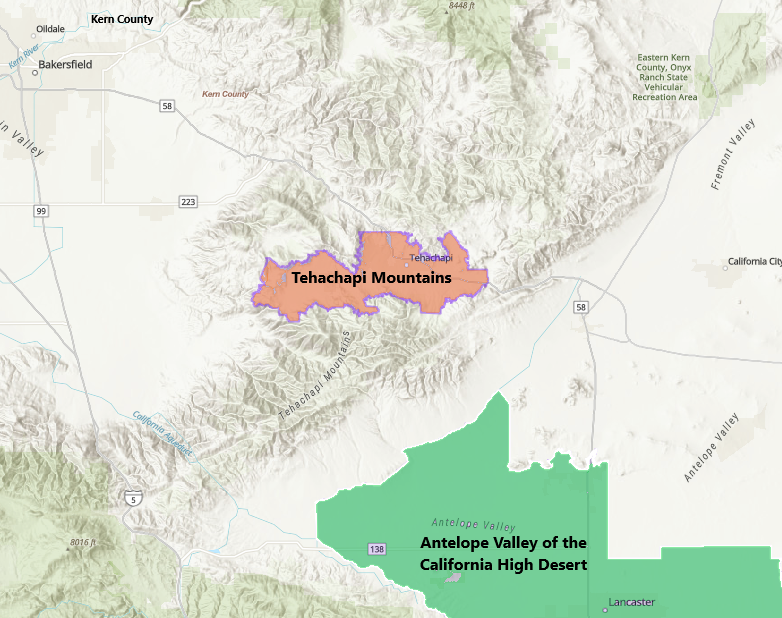
- Type: American Viticultural Area
- Year established: 2020
- Years of wine industry: 25
- Country: United States
- Part of: California, Kern County
- Other regions in California, Kern County: Antelope Valley of the California High Desert AVA
- Growing season: 198 days
- Climate region: Region II
- Heat units: 2,762 GDD units
- Precipitation (annual average): 12.0 in (300 mm)
- Total area: 58,000 acres (91 sq mi)
- Size of planted vineyards: 25 acres (10 ha)
- No. of vineyards: 6
- Grapes produced: Cabernet Sauvignon, Syrah, Zinfandel
- No. of wineries: 1

Tehachapi Mountains is an American Viticultural Area (AVA) located in the general area of the Tehachapi Pass between the Tehachapi Mountains and the southern Sierra Nevada Mountains in Kern County, California encircling the town of Tehachapi about 75 mi (121 km) inland of the Pacific Coast. It was established as the nation's 252^{nd}, the state's 141^{st} and the county's second appellation on November 19, 2020, by the Alcohol and Tobacco Tax and Trade Bureau (TTB), Treasury after reviewing the petition submitted by Julie Bell of Per La Vita LLC, on behalf of local vineyard owners and winemakers, proposing the 58,000-acre (91 sq mi) viticultural area named "Tehachapi Mountains."

In 2020, the AVA had six commercially-producing vineyards cultivating 25 acres (10 ha) as well as one winery. The distinguishing features of Tehachapi Mountains AVA include its topography and climate. No existing AVAs abut the Tehachapi Mountains viticultural area and none exist within a 75 mi (121 km) radius with the closest being Antelope Valley in Kern and Los Angeles counties. The plant hardiness zone ranges from 8a to 9a.

== History ==
Tehachapi Mountains derives its name from the pass of the same name and from the city of Tehachapi, CA. The city of Tehachapi was founded when Southern Pacific Railroad (now Union Pacific Railroad) chose the Tehachapi Pass as the route through the Sierra Nevada Mountains for the railroad line between Sacramento and Los Angeles. The California High-Speed Rail project was originally planned to pass through the city of Tehachapi and the AVA.

The name Tehachapi is unique to the region of the AVA. The origin of the name "Tehachapi" (/təˈhætʃəpi/ tuh-HACH-uh-pee) is uncertain but is thought to derive from the tribe name for the area of the pass and the creek draining from it as recorded in 1853 by Lt. R. S. Williamson and in 1877 by S. Powers.

== Name evidence ==
Tehachapi Mountains takes its name from the Tehachapi Pass within the Tehachapi Mountains range, which partly lie within the AVA. The Tehachapi Mountains are a smaller range of mountains within the southern Sierra Nevada Mountains. The petitioner states the "Tehachapi" (/təˈhætʃəpi/ tuh-HACH-uh-pee) name is unique to the area within the boundaries of the AVA. Further, while the origin of "Tehachapi" is unknown, the petition notes nineteenth century texts show "Tehachapi" may derive from a Native American name for the pass within the Tehachapi Mountains and a creek draining from this pass. The petitioner originally proposed the name "Tehachapi," which is the name of a town within the area, but later requested changing the name to "Tehachapi Mountains" to avoid a potential conflict with label holders using the name "Tehachapi" or the grape varietal "Tehachapi Clone" on their labels. Although there is a peak in the range called "Tehachapi Mountain," the petitioner chose to the name the AVA after the entire range because while parts of the range are within AVA, the peak called "Tehachapi Mountain" is not within the proposed AVA boundaries. The geologic feature called the Tehachapi Pass is located within the proposed AVA and provides passage through the mountain range.

== Terroir ==
=== Topography ===
Tehachapi Mountains AVA is situated at the summit of the southernmost pass in the Sierra Nevada mountain range. The AVA is a broad, saddle-shaped region of mountain foot slopes, high valleys, and rolling hills. The AVA has an east–west orientation, and the terrain at the east and west ends of the "saddle" rise to rugged hills before sharply falling away to lower elevations. However, these hills are not high enough to prevent warm air from the neighboring San Joaquin Valley and Mojave Desert from entering the AVA. Slope angles within the Tehachapi Mountains AVA average between 3 and 11 degrees. Elevations are between 3,600 and 5,400 ft (1,100 and 1,600 m), with the majority of the area situated between 3,800 and 4,600 ft (1,200 and 1,400 m). To the north of the AVA are the steep, high, rugged slopes of the Piute Mountains. Slope angles in this region rise to over 30 degrees, and the mountain summits reach over 6,000 ft (1,800 m), with nearby Bear Mountain reaching 6,913 ft (2,107 m). To the east, the land falls away at slope angles over 30 degrees until it reaches the relatively flat valley floor of the Mojave Desert. Elevations to the east of the AVA average 2,600 ft (790 m). To the south of the AVA, slope angles are also over 30 degrees as the land rises to the summits of the Tehachapi Mountains, with elevations rising over 7,700 ft (2,300 m) at the peak of Cummings Mountain. West of the AVA, the terrain drops sharply at angles over 30 degrees to elevations below 500 ft (150 m) near the city of Bakersfield in the San Joaquin Valley. The topography of the AVA has an effect on viticulture. According to the petition, the Tehachapi Mountains AVA's location in a mountain pass allows for successful viticulture, even at high altitudes. The petition notes that wine grapes are generally grown below 3,000 ft (910 m) within the United States and around the world, due to colder temperatures at higher elevations. However, prevailing west winds from the San Joaquin Valley and east winds off the Mojave Desert allow temperatures to be sufficiently warm within the AVA for grapes to be grown at elevations over 4,000 ft (1,200 m). Also within the AVA, gentle slope angles reduce the risk of erosion and allow cold air to drain away from vineyards. Finally, the petition notes that the intensity of sunlight, especially in the short ultraviolet wavelengths, increases with altitude. As a result, grapes growing at high altitudes within the AVA are exposed to higher intensity ultraviolet light, which stimulates synthesis of phenolic molecules. These molecules allow grapes to develop deep colors and thick skins, which leads to more concentrated, tannic wines.

=== Climate ===
The petition states that the altitude at which wine grapes can be grown successfully is limited by events that can permanently damage or kill vines, such as spring and fall frost events and low winter temperatures. Vitis vinifera grapevines suffer permanent damage at temperatures below about 0 to 5 °F (−18 to −15 °C). The petition states that typical winter lows within the Tehachapi Mountains AVA range from 35 to 26 °F (2 to −3 °C). Further, the petitioner provided data from 2007 through 2016 showing that there was only one year where the minimum temperature within the AVA dropped below 10 °F (−12 °C), and that for five other years the minimum temperature within the AVA was 15 °F (−9 °C) or more. However, the petition states that the number of hours per day spent at the maximum daily temperature is typically longer than the number of hours spent at the minimum daily temperature, as warmer winds from the Mojave Desert and San Joaquin Valley increase after dawn. As a result, vineyards in the AVA have been able to fully ripen late season varietals such as Zinfandel, Syrah, and Cabernet Sauvignon.

The petition included the following climate data from within the AVA and locations to the west, east, north-northeast, and north-northwest of the AVA. The data was collected between 2007 and 2016. Data was not available from stations due north, or to the south, of the AVA.

The Tehachapi Mountains AVA has cooler temperatures, a shorter growing season, and fewer growing degree days than the Bakersfield location to the west, the Edwards Air Force Base location to the east, the Hot Springs station to the north-northwest, and the Five Mile station to the north-northeast. This is to be expected, since the AVA is at higher elevations than all four of these locations. The AVA has warmer temperatures, a longer growing season, and more growing degree days than the Johnsondale location to the north-northwest, which is at higher elevations and is also more sheltered from the warm air of both the San Joaquin Valley and the Mojave Desert. The petition states, however, that elevation alone does not explain the differences in temperature and growing degree day accumulations. Proximity to warm air from the Mojave Desert and, to a lesser extent, the San Joaquin Valley plays an important role. For example, the petition states that temperature generally falls as elevation rises. As the Walker Pass weather station, to the north-northeast of the AVA, is at significantly higher elevations than the AVA, it should therefore have lower average temperatures than the AVA, which would generally lead to a shorter growing season and fewer growing degree accumulations than the AVA. However, because the Walker Pass station is on the eastern flank of a mountain range and is directly exposed to warm air rising from the Mojave Desert, it has warmer temperatures, a longer growing season, and greater growing degree accumulations than the AVA. According to the petition, the Tehachapi Mountains AVA's proximity to the San Joaquin Valley and Mojave Desert affects viticulture. Winter temperatures are well above vine-killing temperatures, and the growing season length and growing degree day accumulations are sufficient to ripen late season varietals.

== Viticulture ==
The first successful commercial vineyard in the Tehachapi area was planted in 2001 by Bob and Patti Souza and consists of six acres (2.4 ha) of Primitivo (Italian variant of Zinfandel) and Sauvignon Blanc vines. There are currently six commercial vineyards, which cover approximately 25 acres (10 ha), distributed across the AVA. The AVA has four tasting room/event facilities and one bonded winery. Wines from the Tehachapi AVA area have received awards at competitions including the San Francisco Chronicle Wine Competition and the Los Angeles International Wine Competition.

No existing AVAs abut the Tehachapi viticultural area and none exist within a 75 mi (121 km) radius. Table, raisin and wine grapes are grown in the much lower elevation, below 500 ft (150 m), significantly hotter, over 5,500 GDD, San Joaquin Valley to the west; however, no AVA exists for this area and the terroir differs significantly from that of the AVA. The moderate climate of the Tehachapi area provides optimal conditions for greenhouse operations in that heating and cooling costs are minimized. There are two large-scale, over 20 acres (8.1 ha), commercial greenhouses operating in the Tehachapi area that produce organic vegetables and a third is currently under construction.

Table, raisin and wine grapes are grown in the much lower elevation below 500 ft (150 m), significantly hotter (over 5,500 growing degree days) San Joaquin valley to the west; however, no AVA exists for this area and the terroir differs significantly from that of the AVA. Wine growing and production began in the area in 2006.
