= Errea House =

Historic house in California, United States

- U.S. National Register of Historic Places
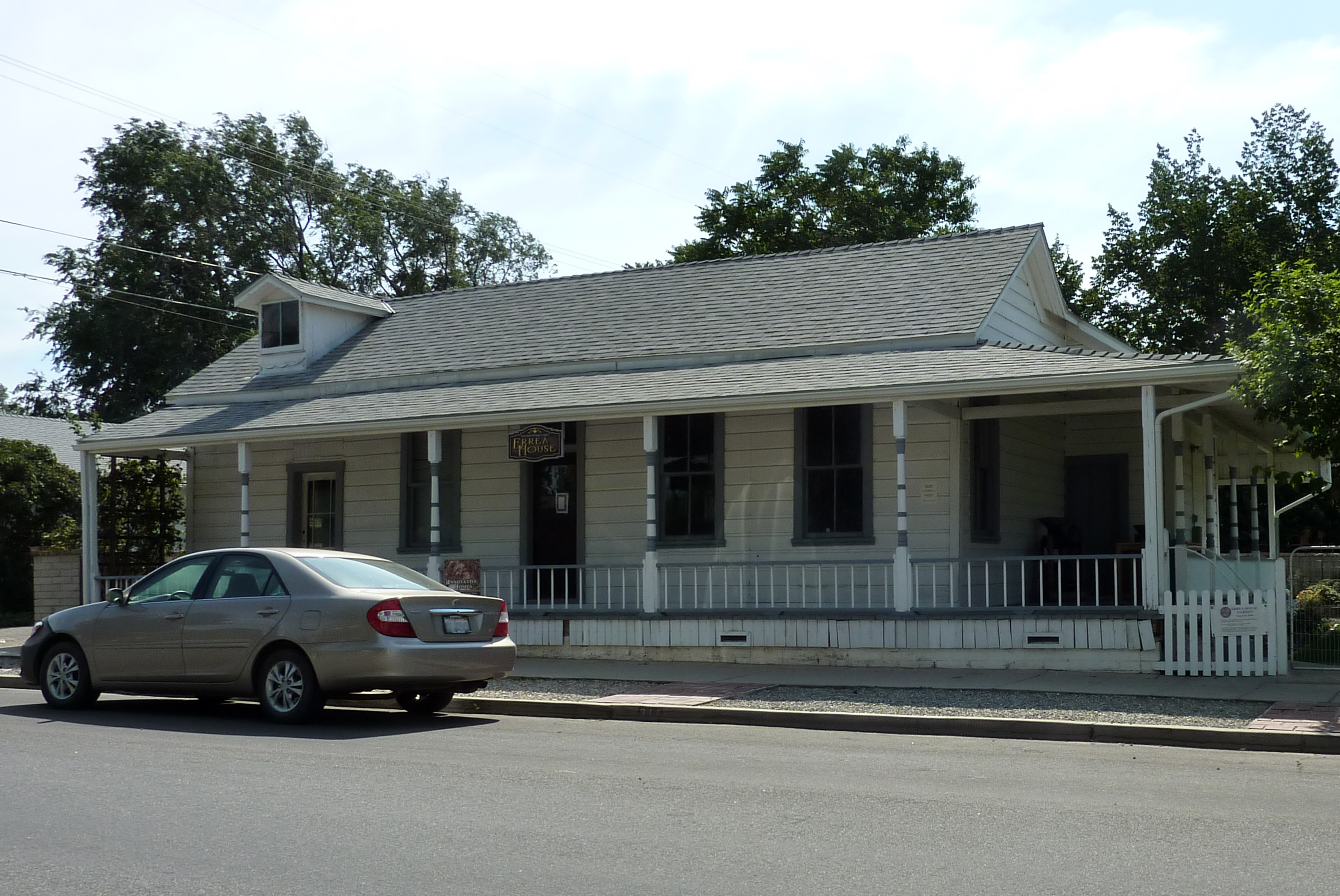

- Location within California Location within the United States
- Location: 311 S. Green St., Tehachapi, California
- Coordinates: 35°7′46″N 118°26′49″W
- Area: 0.1 acres (0.040 ha)
- Architectural style: Greek Revival
- NRHP reference No.: 97000809
- Added to NRHP: July 29, 1997

The Errea House, a historic house located at 311 S. Green St. in Tehachapi, California, is the house is the only surviving building from the settlement of Tehichipa, the first town in the Tehachapi area. Tehichipa was founded in 1869, and the house was built sometime between 1870 and 1875. In 1876, the Southern Pacific Railroad bypassed Tehichipa, instead establishing a new townsite at Tehachapi Summit, which later became Tehachapi. The railroad's action led to the decline of Tehichipa's shipping industry, and the town's residents gradually moved to Tehachapi. The Errea House was moved to Tehachapi as well around 1900. No buildings from the original settlement survive at the site of Tehichipa, and the Errea House is the only building remaining from the town. The Errea House is now located across from the Tehachapi Museum, where it helps illustrate the city's early history.

The Errea House was added to the National Register of Historic Places on July 29, 1997.

== See also ==
- Tehachapi Mountains
- National Register of Historic Places in Kern County, California
