= Gerald Parker =

American serial killer and rapist

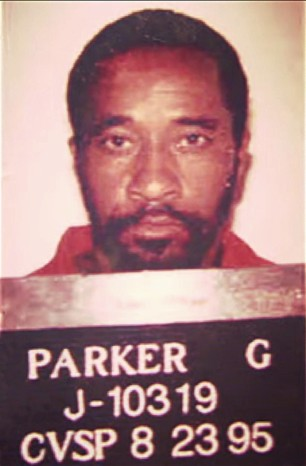
- Parker's mugshot in 1995
- Born: 1955 (age 70–71)
- Other names: The Bedroom Basher; The Bludgeon Killer
- Convictions: First degree murder with special circumstances (6 counts); Rape
- Penalty: Death

Details
- Victims: 6
- Span of crimes: December 1, 1978 – October 20, 1979
- Country: United States
- State: California
- Date apprehended: June 14, 1996
- Imprisoned at: California Medical Facility, Vacaville, California

Gerald Parker (born 1955), also known as the Bedroom Basher and the Bludgeon Killer, is an American serial killer and sex offender who raped and murdered five young women and girls aged 17 to 31 in Orange County, California, from December 1978 through October 1979. During this time, he was a member of the U.S. Marine Corps stationed in Tustin. He was dishonorably discharged in 1980 after his conviction for rape, but he would not be linked to the murders until over a decade later following a DNA match.

Parker confessed and was also confirmed to have assaulted a sixth victim, who was pregnant at the time of the attack; she survived, but her child was delivered stillborn. Her husband, Kevin Lee Green, was falsely convicted of the attack and served 16 years in prison until Parker's arrest. Parker was sentenced to death in 1999 and as of 2026 is incarcerated at California Medical Facility.

== Early life ==
Gerald Parker was born in 1955 and lived with his family in Phoenix, Arizona. In 1963, when Parker was 8 years old, his mother, Frankie Wagner Parker, died while giving birth to her 10th child and his father abandoned his family. He moved in with his grandmother, and during the five months he was there, he was sent to Juvenile Hall for sniffing glue. Afterwards, he and his brother went to live with his older cousin, Florence Russell, in Logan Heights. Though much of his youth was spent at Boys Republic, a private all-boys school for troubled adolescents, Russell said he never gave her any problems. In June 1971, his school presented him with a work experience reward for food preparation. The following year, he was a runner up for the Chino Rotary club's annual Crombie Allen award.

According to statements made by Parker to forensic psychiatrist Dr. Paul Blair, Parker regularly inhaled glue, paint, and paint thinner between the ages of 7 and 15. He began using marijuana at age 11, and claimed to use PCP and LSD, as well as speedballs intravenously. He also reported drinking a case of beer every day for 10 to 11 years.

In 1973, Parker joined the Marine Corps and trained in San Diego and Camp Pendleton. In July, he was sent to Adak Naval Air Facility, where he served for a year as a barracks security guard. He was transferred to North Carolina and Mississippi before arriving in Tustin in September 1975. In late 1979, he served as staff sergeant at the Marine Corps Air Station El Toro until he was dishonorably discharged for a felony conviction the following year.

== Crimes ==
=== Murders ===
According to his testimony, on December 1, 1978, in Anaheim, Parker entered the apartment of 17-year-old Sandra Fry through an open bedroom window carrying a 2" × 4" piece of wood. He hit Fry several times with the board. Parker wanted to rape her but could not get an erection, so he ejaculated on her body. When Fry's roommate returned home, she saw the condition Fry was in and police were contacted. Fry was transported to the emergency room where she was pronounced dead.

Parker's next murder took place on April 1, 1979, in Costa Mesa. He entered the apartment of 21-year-old Kimberly Rawlins through an unlocked front door, carrying a 2" × 4" piece of wood, and struck her several times. When her roommate came home, about four hours later, she found Rawlins dead; her bathrobe was open. During the autopsy, Rawlins' tampon was collected for evidence and semen found on the string, later tested for DNA, matched the profile of Parker.

In the early morning hours of September 15, 1979, Parker entered the Costa Mesa apartment of 31-year-old Marolyn Carleton through an unlocked sliding glass door. Parker brutally beat her during an attempted rape, causing her severe head injuries, which she would die from the following day. This crime was witnessed by the victim's nine-year-old son, who subsequently described the attacker to police.

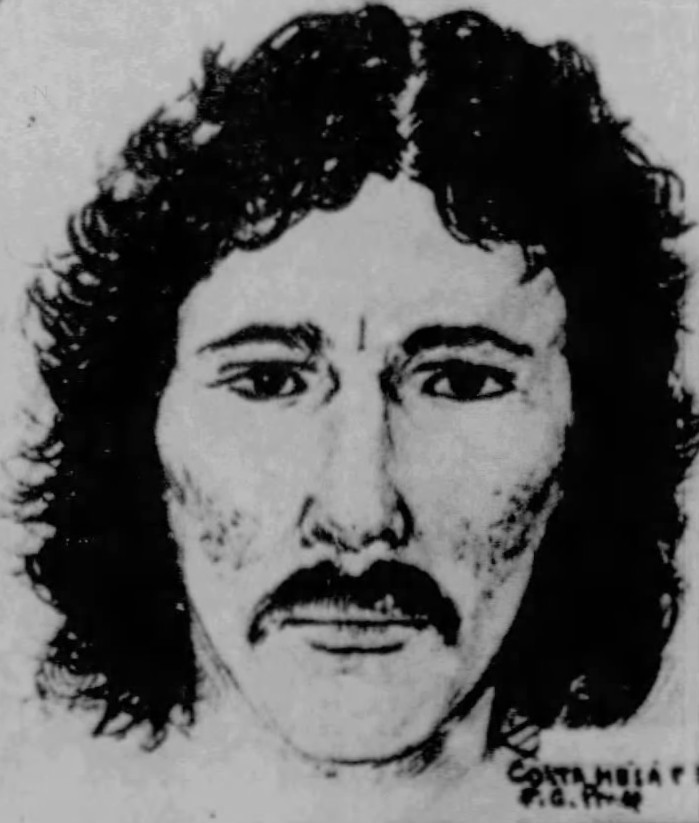
1979 composite sketch of the killer

On September 30, 1979, Parker walked through the unlocked front door of 20-year-old nurse Dianna Green's apartment in Tustin. He hit Green, who was nine months pregnant, in the head and raped her while she was unconscious. When an officer arrived, they noticed a hole in her forehead; the hole was so deep he could see brain matter. Green was in a coma for ten days and upon regaining consciousness she had total amnesia. Her unborn child, named Chantal Marie Green, was delivered stillborn. Her husband, Kevin Green, was arrested for the attack. During his trial, Green testified that her husband attacked her since she refused to have sex with him. Kevin Green was wrongfully convicted and sentenced to life imprisonment. However, vaginal swabs obtained from Green the night of the rape were later matched to Parker's DNA profile, and Green's husband was freed after 17 years in prison.

On October 6, 1979, Parker took a mallet out of a truck near the Tustin apartment of 24-year-old Debora Kennedy. He entered through the bedroom window, hit her on the head as she lay asleep next to the couch, and proceeded to rape her. The attack caused severe head trauma and a brain hemorrhage; she later died of her injuries. In this instance, Parker managed to avoid leaving behind any incriminating evidence, aside from his semen traces on the victim's body.

Fourteen days later, on October 20, 1979, Parker scoped out the empty apartment of 17-year-old Debra Lynn Senior by pretending to be a jogger. He entered through a bathroom window, leaving a palm print of his left hand. When Senior arrived home, Parker hit her several times on the head with a blunt object, moved her unconscious body into the bedroom, and raped her. After her roommate came home, police and paramedics were called; she was pronounced dead at the scene.

=== Assaults ===
On July 19, 1979, Parker entered the Costa Mesa apartment of 24-year-old Jane Pettengill through an open dining room window. He grabbed a piece of wood, hit her over the head several times, and raped her. A concerned friend went to check on Jane and called the police. She was taken to the hospital and a rape kit was collected, which would ultimately be tested and matched to DNA found at several of the murder scenes. Pettengill was in a coma for about four weeks, her skull had been fractured, and she required a permanent tracheotomy.

On February 2, 1980, Aida Demirjian was locking her car in the underground parking garage at her apartment complex when Parker struck her numerous times with a metal pipe. He dragged her several feet, took off her necklace, looked through her purse, and lifted up her skirt. Demirjian got up and ran to the first floor, banged on the apartment manager's door, and lost consciousness. A witness across the street observed Parker standing over Demirjian and yelled at him to stop; Parker ran off. Demirjian's fingers were so swollen from trying to protect her head while being attacked that paramedics had to cut off her rings. When an officer arrived about a block away, Parker crossed the path of his car, whereupon he noticed that Parker had blood stains on his shirt and pants and had blood on his hands. Parker was detained and provided his Marine Corps identification. Once the witness indicated that Parker looked like the suspect, Parker was taken into custody. The officer noted that Parker did not appear to be intoxicated and his demeanor was calm and cooperative. Another officer located the bloody pipe, which was eight inches long and three inches in diameter. Near the pipe was a gold and pearl necklace. Nine months after the attack, on October 2, 1980, Parker was convicted in Los Angeles County Superior Court of robbing Demirjian and inflicting great bodily injury upon her during the commission of the robbery.

Two weeks after the attack on Aida Demirjian, on February 15, 1980, 13-year-old Paula S. was walking home from a drug store in Tustin after attending her father's funeral. A black van drove past her and pulled over. Parker exited the driver's side of the vehicle, opened the side door, walked around to the back, and proceeded to check the tire. But as Paula walked by, Parker grabbed her sweater, punched her in the face, and threw her into the van. After driving around for about 25 minutes, Parker stopped the van in a shopping center parking lot. He closed the curtain separating the back of the van from the driver's compartment and asked Paula if she'd ever been raped. She told him no, and his response was, "Well, this is what it is like." He ripped a towel into strips, put some in her mouth, one around her head, and used another to tie her hands together. After he raped her, he asked her what she had in the bag she was carrying, if she would tell her parents, and if she would identify him in a police line up. She answered no to the last two questions and he drove her to an alley and dropped her off. Paula made mental notes of details about Parker and the van, and when she got home she told her mother what happened and they called the police. Three days later, an investigator from the Orange County Sheriff's Department contacted military police at Marine Corps Air Station El Toro and Parker was called in for questioning. Before investigators could show Paula a photo of Parker, he confessed. Parker admitted that if Paula had been older he probably would have killed her. On May 13, 1980, Parker was convicted in Orange County Superior Court of kidnapping and rape. He was sentenced to six years in prison.

On February 13, 1984, Parker beat his roommate, David Feurtadot, while he was sleeping, at the California Correctional Institution. A correctional officer found a 24" long piece of steel, splattered with blood, on the floor of the shared room. Feurtadot received several stitches and was in the hospital for a week following the attack. On June 1, 1984, Parker was convicted in Kern County Superior Court of assault with a deadly weapon.

In November 1988, Parker was arrested in Garden Grove for the attempted forcible oral copulation of a woman while armed with a knife. Parker was subsequently imprisoned for that attack.

== Arrest ==
Since Parker was not linked to the murders in Orange County until nearly two decades later, he was known as the "Bludgeon Killer" in the area. At the time, homicide investigators relied on a profile that indicated that the Bludgeon Killer had a desire to control women and was likely unintelligent and insecure. The investigation extended into the late 1980s and a handful of suspects were looked into, but all were dismissed.

By 1996, the investigation into the Bludgeon Killer was considered a cold case; however, in June of that year DNA samples left at several of the crime scenes were matched to a sample Parker had recently given up. Parker confessed to the crimes in an interview with detectives at Corcoran State Prison, where he was serving a sentence for an unrelated assault. He also confessed to another crime not previously linked to the Bludgeon Killer; the attack on Dianna Green and subsequent death of her unborn baby. Parker gave investigators details about the crime that were not previously made public, on the basis of which Kevin Lee Green was exonerated and released from Soledad State Prison.

== Trial ==
On June 21, 1996, Parker was charged with six murders. Owing to California's statute of limitations on pre-1990 rape cases, Parker could not be charged with the 1979 attack on Jane Pettengill despite DNA identifying him as the assailant. DNA experts testified at the trial that samples taken from Parker's blood compared with evidence collected at the scenes were "indistinguishable from each other." In September, it was announced that the death penalty was being sought for Parker. On October 20, 1998, after only two hours of deliberation, Parker was convicted on six counts of first degree murder, including special circumstances, which made him eligible for the death penalty. During the sentencing phase of his trial, Parker accepted full responsibility and stated:

If my life is what it takes for them to feel that their family members have been vindicated, then that is what I believe should be done. My life should be taken away from me.

On November 12, 1998, the jury rendered a verdict of death. Parker was ordered to San Quentin State Prison to await execution by lethal injection.

== Aftermath ==
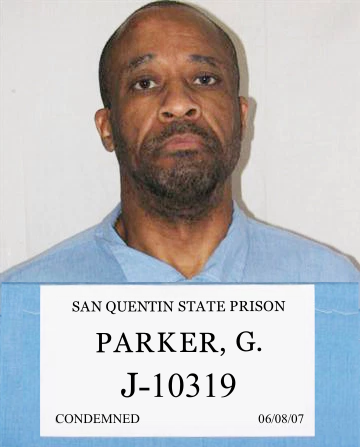
Parker on death row in 2007

Parker is currently incarcerated at California Medical Facility, awaiting execution. In 2017, his lawyers appealed for the nullification of his death sentence and for a new trial, arguing that Parker was mentally disturbed at the time of the murders, as a result of his being bullied as a child combined with abuse of drugs and alcohol. However, that appeal was rejected.

== Victims ==
Name	Age	Date	Outcome
Sandra Fry	17	December 1, 1978	Died
Kimberly Rawlins	21	April 1, 1979	Died
Jane Pettengill	24	July 19, 1979	Survived
Marolyn Carleton	31	September 15, 1979	Died
Dianna Green	20	September 30, 1979	Survived
Chantal Marie Green	0	September 30, 1979	Died
Debora Kennedy	24	October 6, 1979	Died
Debra Lynn Senior	17	October 20, 1979	Died
Aida Demirjian	?	February 2, 1980	Survived
Paula S.	13	February 15, 1980	Survived
David Feurtadot	?	February 13, 1984	Survived

== See also ==
- List of serial killers in the United States

== Bibliography ==
- Robert D. Keppel and William J. Birnes (2003). The Psychology of Serial Killer Investigations: The Grisly Business Unit. Academic Press. p. 18. ISBN 9780124042605.
