= Kawaiisu language =

Uto-Aztecan language spoken in California

Kawaiisu
- Nɨwɨ'abigidɨ, Nɨwɨ'abigipɨ, Nuwä Abigip
- Pronunciation: [nɨwɨʔabiɣidɨ], [nɨwɨʔabiɣipɨ]
- Native to: United States
- Region: California
- Ethnicity: 60 Kawaiisu (2010)
- Native speakers: 1 (2025) "more than a dozen" of varying proficiency (2021)
- Language family: Uto-Aztecan: Numic; Southern Numic; Kawaiisu

Language codes
- ISO 639-3: xaw
- Glottolog: kawa1283
- ELP: Kawaiisu
- Kawaiisu

- Kawaiisu is classified as Critically Endangered by the UNESCO Atlas of the World's Languages in Danger.

The Kawaiisu language (English: /kəˈwaɪsuː/, Kawaiisu: Nuwä Abigip) is a Uto-Aztecan language spoken by the Kawaiisu people of California. As of 2025, only one native speaker remains, Lucille Girado.

== Classification ==
Kawaiisu is a member of the Southern Numic division of the Uto-Aztecan language family.

== Geographic distribution ==
The Kawaiisu homeland was bordered by speakers of non-Numic Uto-Aztecan languages: the Kitanemuk to the south spoke Takic, the Tubatulabal to the north spoke Tubatulabal, the Yokuts to the west were non-Uto-Aztecan. Because they shared the Southern Numic language, the Chemehuevi to the east are considered the closest relatives to Kawaiisu.

The remaining Kawaiisu speakers live in the Tehachapi area of California.

== Revitalization ==
In 1994, the language was severely endangered, with perhaps fewer than 20 remaining speakers.

In 2011, The Kawaiisu Project received the Governor's Historic Preservation Award for its efforts to document the Kaiwaiisu language and culture, including "the Handbook of the Kawaiisu, language teaching and the Kawaiisu Language and Cultural Center [and] the Kawaiisu exhibit at the Tehachapi Museum." As of 2012, the Kawaiisu Language and Cultural Center offers language classes and DVDs for home learning, as well as training for other groups seeking to create language learning programs and materials.

== Phonology ==
=== Vowels ===
Kawaiisu has a typical Numic vowel inventory of six vowels.

	front	back	
	front	unrounded	rounded
High	i	ɨ	u
Non-High	e	a	o

=== Consonants ===
Kawaiisu has an atypical Numic consonant inventory in that many of the predictable consonant alternations in other Numic languages are no longer predictable in Kawaiisu. The Kawaiisu consonant inventory, therefore is much larger than the typical Numic language.

		Bilabial	Coronal	Palatal	Velar		Glottal
		Bilabial	Coronal	Palatal	plain	lab.	Glottal
Nasal		m	n		(ŋ)*		
Plosive	voiceless	p	t		k	kʷ	ʔ
Plosive	voiced	b	d				
Affricate			ts	tʃ			
Fricative	voiceless		s	ʃ			h / hʷ
Fricative	voiced	β	z	ʒ	ɣ	ɣʷ	
Approximant			(l)*	j		w	
Flap			ɾ				

- /l/ and /ŋ/ are found only in loanwords.

== Morphology ==
Kawaiisu is an agglutinative language, in which words use suffix complexes for a variety of purposes with several morphemes strung together.
