= Tehachapi Municipal Airport =

Airport in Kern County, California, U.S.

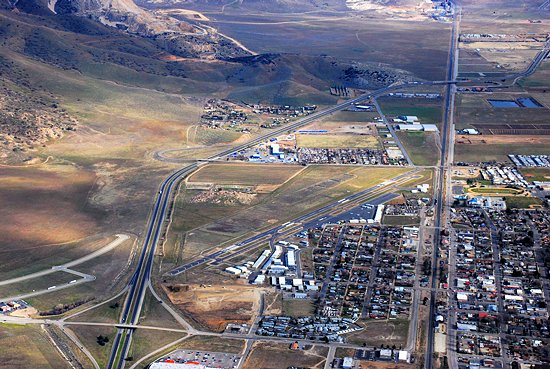
- Aerial: KTSP Airport area
- IATA: TSP; ICAO: KTSP; FAA LID: TSP

Summary
- Airport type: Public
- Operator: City of Tehachapi
- Location: Tehachapi, California
- Elevation AMSL: 4,001 ft / 1,219.5 m
- Coordinates: 35°08′06″N 118°26′21″W
- Website: Official website
- Interactive map of Tehachapi Municipal Airport

Runways
Direction	Length		Surface
Direction	ft	m	Surface
11/29	4,031	1,229	Asphalt

Tehachapi Municipal Airport (IATA: TSP, ICAO: KTSP, FAA LID: TSP) is in Tehachapi, Kern County, California. It covers 264 acres (107 ha) and has one runway.

The airport was established in 1929 originally to support an air mail route between Tehachapi and Bakersfield. After the 1952 Kern County earthquake Tehachapi became inaccessible by roads or rail, and the airport saw an emergency relief airlift for several weeks. There are hangars and an industrial park on the south side of the airport, and in 2009 the city was planning an expansion to include a taxiway and hangars on the north side.

In 1974 Golden West Airlines scheduled de Havilland Canada DHC-6 Twin Otters to Los Angeles (LAX). The flight is in the August 1974 OAG but not in the March 1975 edition.

Golden Age Flight Museum moved to temporary quarters in 2022.

== See also ==
- Mountain Valley Airport, privately owned gliderport also located in Tehachapi
- List of airports in Kern County, California
