= California Correctional Institution =

Supermax prison located near Tehachapi, California

California Correctional Institution (CCI)
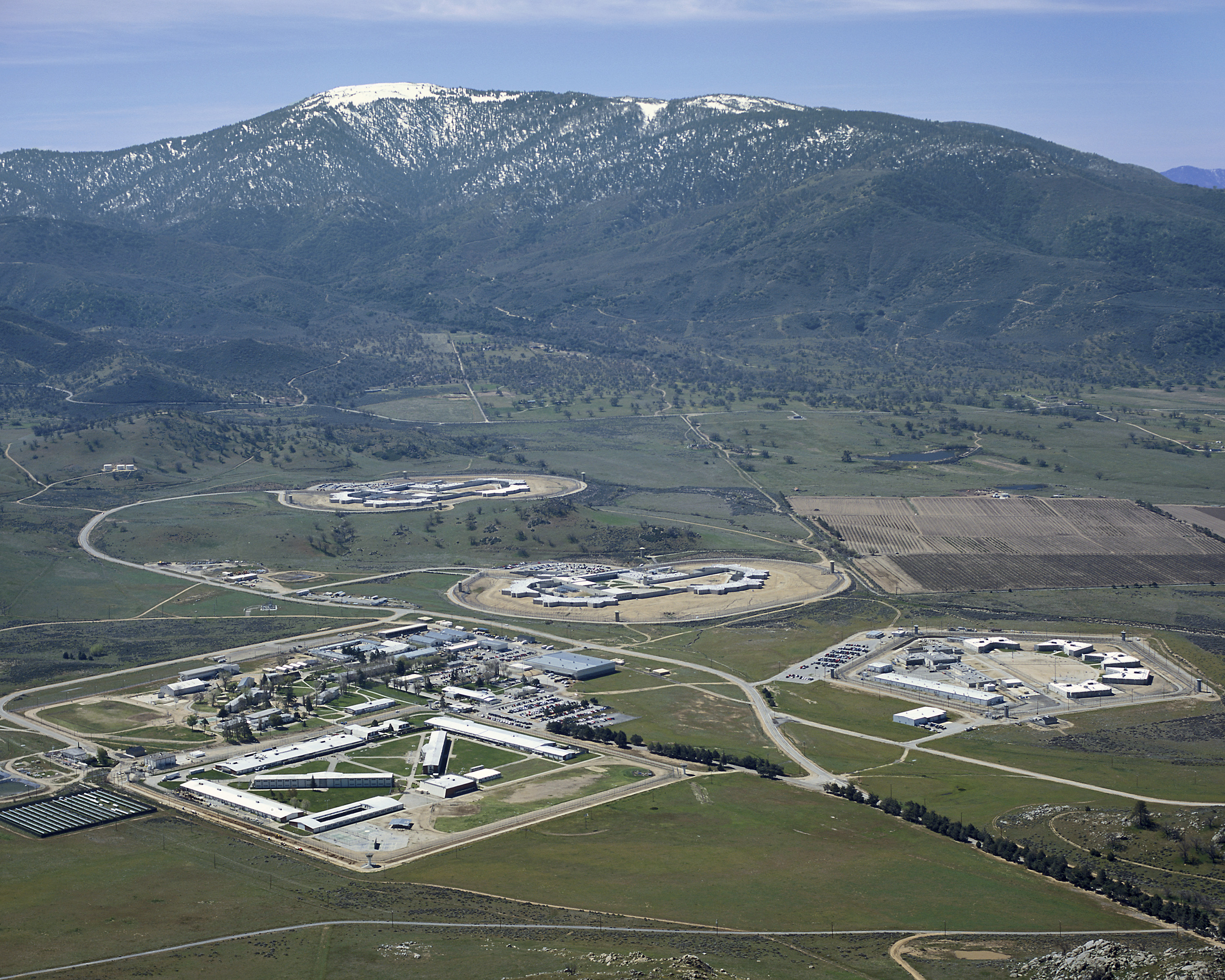
- Interactive map of California Correctional Institution (CCI)
- Location: Tehachapi, California; 35.111°N 118.569°W
- Status: Operational
- Security class: Minimum to Supermax
- Capacity: 2,172
- Population: 2,611 (120.2%) (January 31, 2023)
- Opened: 1954 (original California Institution for Women existed on same site 1932–1952)
- Managed by: California Department of Corrections and Rehabilitation
- Warden: Thomas Valdez (acting)

California Correctional Institution (CCI) is a supermax state prison in the city of Tehachapi in Southern California. CCI is sometimes referred to as "Tehachapi prison" or "Tehachapi". As stated by the California Department of Corrections and Rehabilitation, its overall mission is "to incarcerate and control felons, while providing the opportunity for meaningful work, training and other programs. The prison provides programs for those inmates who are willing to work and participate fully in available programs."

== Facilities ==
Location of Tehachapi in Kern County, and Kern County in California

CCI is in the Cummings Valley region.

CCI has 1,650 acres (670 ha) including Level I ("Open dormitories with a secure perimeter") housing; Level II ("Open dormitories with secure perimeter fences and armed coverage") housing; Level III ("Individual cells, fenced perimeters and armed coverage") housing; Level IV ("Cells, fenced or walled perimeters, electronic security, more staff and armed officers both inside and outside the installation") housing; a Security Housing Unit (SHU, which is "the most secure area within a Level IV prison designed to provide maximum coverage"); and a Reception Center (RC) which "provides short term housing to process, classify and evaluate incoming inmates." As of November 2020, the facility's total population was 2983, or 107.2 percent of its design capacity of 2,783.

== History ==
The original California Institution for Women, the first women's facility in California, opened on the site of what is now CCI in 1932. It was sometimes referred to as "Tehachapi", as in the 1940s films Maltese Falcon and Double Indemnity. The institution was "run for many years independently from the correctional system for men" but beginning in 1944 was gradually brought under the control of the California Department of Corrections. After the 1952 Kern County earthquake on July 21, "made the brick dormitories unsafe", the institution was closed and the 417 prisoners were sent to the new California Institution for Women in Corona.

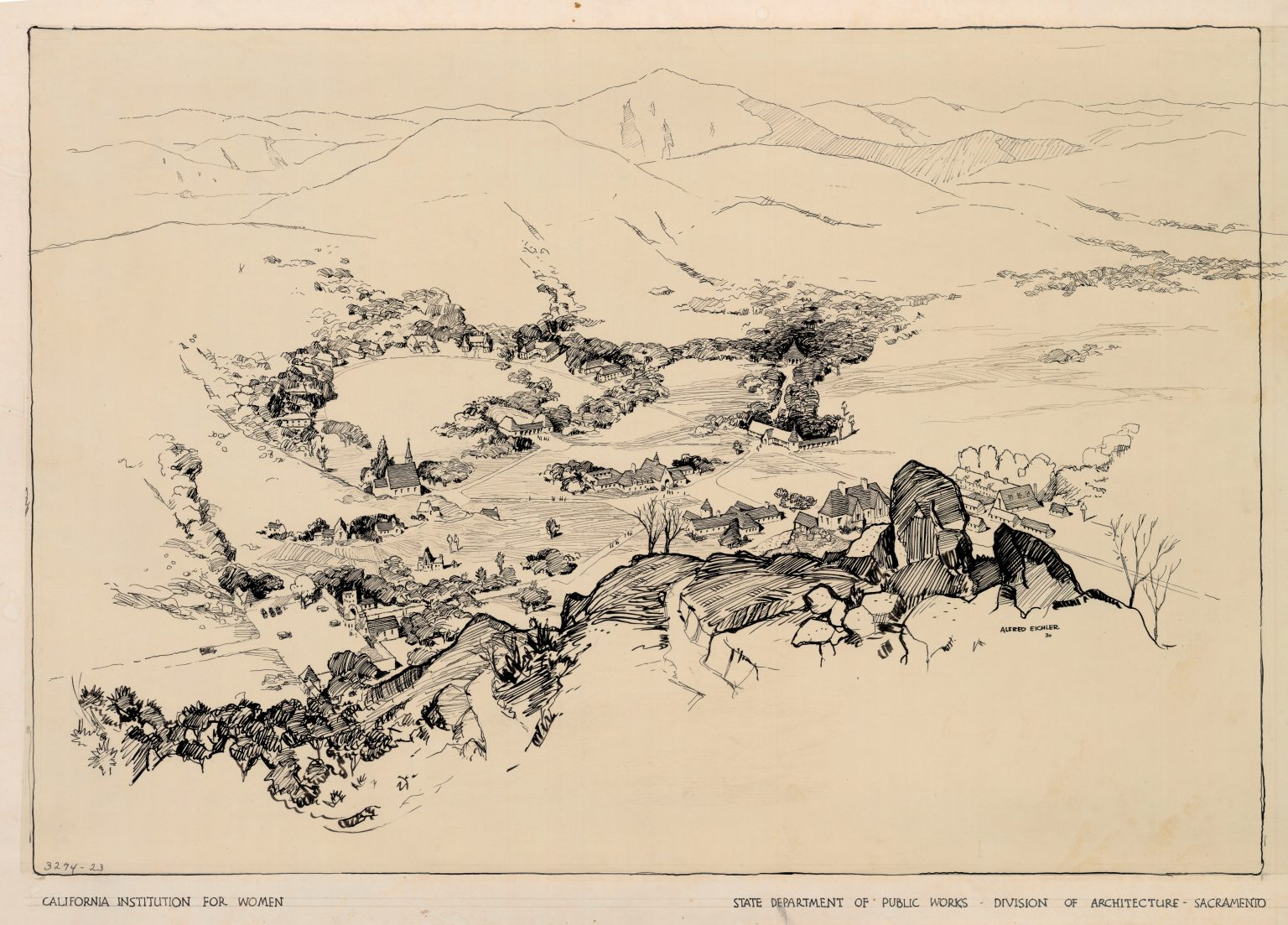
Plans of the prison drawn by Alfred Eichler in 1930.

The prison was reopened in 1954 as CCI, an all-men's prison. In 1985–1986, maximum and medium security facilities were added to it. The Southern Maximum Security Complex at Tehachapi was "touted as the most advanced in the country", but was also "called a 'white elephant' and a 'Cadillac' because it took so long to build and cost so much".

Governor Arnold Schwarzenegger "directed inmate firefighters and staff from the California Department of Corrections and Rehabilitation", including those from CCI, to help fight the October 2007 California wildfires.

== In popular culture ==
The women's prison has been frequently mentioned in popular film and radio, particularly during the noir era.

- The Maltese Falcon (1941)
- Double Indemnity (1944)
- Nocturne (1946)
- The Postman Always Rings Twice (1946)
- Out of the Past (1947)
- The Hunted (1948)
- Criss Cross (1949)
- The Story of Molly X (1949)
- 1001 Rabbit Tales (1982)
- The Black Echo, 1991
- Duckman episode title "Noir Gang" (1996)
- Inherent Vice by Thomas Pynchon (page 106 (Italian translation)) (2009)
- Dragnet radio drama series
- Wanda Jackson, "There's a Riot Goin' On" rock-a-billy recording

JR (artist) made a documentary film in 2023.

== Notable inmates ==
- Inez Brown Burns (1886–1976), socialite convicted of performing illegal abortions; served 2 years and 7 months.
- Joseph Danks (born 1962), serial killer convicted of killing six men; was later transferred to San Quentin State Prison for killing a cellmate.
- Scott Evans Dekraai, perpetrator of the 2011 Seal Beach shooting.
- David Wayne DePape (born 1980), Canadian citizen convicted of attacking Paul Pelosi with a hammer in San Francisco.
- Barbara Graham (1923–1955), murderer; later transferred to San Quentin State Prison and was executed.
- Tory Lanez (born 1992), Canadian singer and rapper convicted of shooting Megan Thee Stallion in July 2020. Lanez was transferred to California Men’s Colony in May 2025.
- Philip Joseph Hughes Jr. (born 1948), serial killer
- John William Kelley (born 1963), serial killer and rapist.
- Blake Leibel (born 1981), former graphic novelist convicted of murdering his Ukrainian fiancé Iana Kasian. Blake is now in Centinela State Prison.
- Madge Meredith (1921–2017), actress wrongfully convicted of kidnapping; was released in 1951.
- Gerald Parker (born 1955), serial killer. Currently at San Quentin Rehabilitation Center.
- Kellen Winslow II (born 1983), former National Football League tight end, pleaded guilty to the rape of an unconscious underage teen and sexual battery on a 54-year-old hitchhiker as part of a plea deal on November 4, 2019. In exchange for his guilty plea at San Diego County Superior Court, the court agreed to sentence him to between 12 and 18 years in prison.

== Notable staff ==
- David Scott Milton (1934–2020), author who ran a writer's workshop at the institution from 1991–2004
