= Old Town, Kern County, California =

Unincorporated community in California, United States

Old Town
- Unincorporated community
- Location in California Old Town (the United States)
- Coordinates: 35°08′34″N 118°29′41″W
- Country: United States
- State: California
- County: Kern
- Elevation: 3,829 ft (1,167 m)

Old Town (formerly, Williamsburg) is an unincorporated community in Kern County, California, United States. It is located 3 miles (4.8 km) west-northwest of Tehachapi, at an elevation of 3829 feet (1167 m).

The name Williamsburg honored James E. Williams, a businessman. A post office operated at Old Town from 1877 (being transferred from Tehichipa) to 1885.
