= Kawaiisu =

Indigenous people of California

Kawaiiasu Nuwa
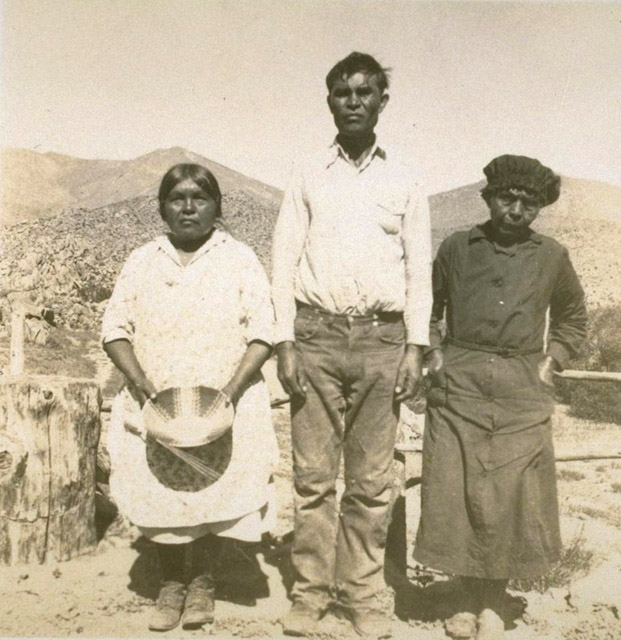
- A Kawaiisu family

Total population
- 2010: 60 alone and in combination

Regions with significant populations
- United States (California)

Languages
- English, Kawaiisu

Religion
- Indigenous religion, Christianity

Related ethnic groups
- Ute, Chemehuevi, and Southern Paiute

The Kawaiisu are an Indigenous peoples of California in the United States who live in the Tehachapi Valley and to the north across the Tehachapi Pass in the southern Sierra Nevada, toward Lake Isabella and Walker Pass.

Historically, the Kawaiisu also traveled eastward on food-gathering trips to areas in the northern Mojave Desert, to the north and northeast of the Antelope Valley, Searles Valley, as far east as the Panamint Valley, the Panamint Mountains, and the western edge of Death Valley. Today, some Kawaiisu people are enrolled in the Tule River Indian Tribe.

== Language ==
The Kawaiisu language, or Tehachapi, is a member of the Southern Numic division of the Uto-Aztecan language family. The Kawaiisu homeland was bordered by speakers of non-Numic Uto-Aztecan languages. The Kitanemuk to the south spoke Takic, the Tübatulabal to the north spoke the Tübatulabal language. The Yokuts (Monilabal) to the west were non-Uto-Aztecan. Because they also spoke a Southern Numic language, the Chemehuevi to the east are the closest linguistic relatives to Kawaiisu.

== Name ==
The Kawaiisu have been known by several other names, including the Caliente, Paiute, Tehachapi Valley Indians, and Tehachapi Indians, but they called themselves depending on dialect Nuwu, New-wa, Nu-oo-ah or Niwiwi, meaning "The People." The tribal designations as "Kawaiisu" or "Tehachapi Indians" are both English adoptions of the Yokutsan words used by the neighboring Yokuts. Today, the Kawaiisu identify themselves as "Paiute" and the self-identification term Nüwa ("People") is commonly used by themselves and in the newspapers and media.

== History ==
Before European contact, the Kawaiisu lived in permanent winter villages of 60 to 100 people. They often divided into smaller groups during the warmer months of the year and harvested plants in the mountains and deserts, and animals, for food and raw materials. They were divided into two regional groups: the "Desert Kawaiisu" and the "Mountain Kawaiisu".

The Kawaiisu are related by language and culture to the Southern Paiute of southwestern Nevada and the Chemehuevi of the eastern Mojave Desert of California. They may have originally lived in the desert before coming to the Tehachapi Mountains region, perhaps as early as 2,000 years ago or before.

The Kawaiisu maintained friendly relations with the neighboring Kitanemuk and also participated in cooperative antelope drives (driving herds of antelope into traps so they could be more easily slaughtered) with the Yokuts, another group living in the San Joaquin Valley.

The Numic-speaking peoples of this area (Kawaiisu, Timbisha/Panamint Shoshone (Kohozi – "Koso/Panamint people"), Southern Paiute, Owens Valley Paiute (Pagazozi – "water people"), and Coso people) are famous for their petroglyphs and rock art.

In 2011, The Kawaiisu Project received the Governor's Historic Preservation Award for its efforts to document the Kaiwaiisu language and culture, including "the Handbook of the Kawaiisu, language teaching ... the Kawaiisu Language and Cultural Center, [and] the Kawaiisu exhibit at the Tehachapi Museum." A local newspaper noted in 2010, "There are also several hundred living Kawaiisu descendants, even though a pervasive misconception believes them to be all gone."

== Population ==
Estimates for the pre-contact populations of most native groups in California have varied substantially. Alfred L. Kroeber proposed the combined 1770 population of the Kawaiisu as 1,500. He estimated the surviving population of the Kawaiisu in 1910 as 500.

== Culture ==
Acorns were the main food source for the Kawaiisu tribe. The Tehachapi Mountains had lots of other plants you could eat, like wild celery, wild parsley, rice grass, fiddleneck ferns, box thorn, chia, and different types of grasses. You could also find some berry varieties growing there. Besides acorns, the Kawaiisu people would collect buckeye nuts, grind them into flour, and use that flour to make mush or flat cakes. They could also get other plants from the desert nearby, such as mesquite, but these desert plants didn't make up a big part of what they ate. Deer was the meat that the tribe liked to eat the most.

== See also ==
- Kawaiisu traditional narratives
- Classification of the Indigenous peoples of the Americas
