= Tehachapi, California =

City in California, United States

- City
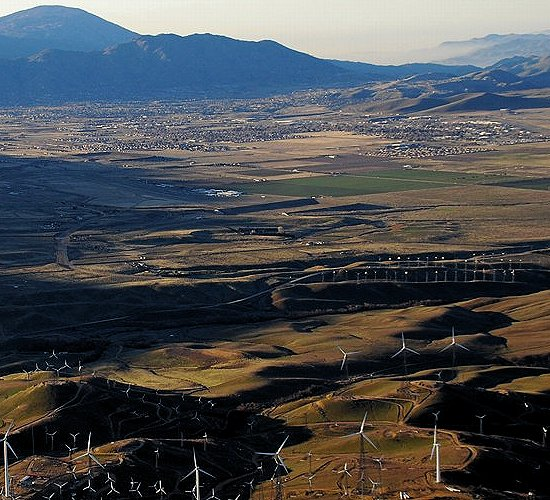
- View of wind turbines with Tehachapi in the distance

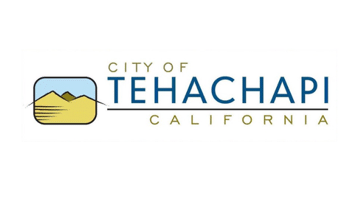
- Flag
- Nickname: The Land of Four Seasons
- Interactive map of Tehachapi, California
- Location in California Location within the United States
- Coordinates: 35°07′56″N 118°26′56″W
- Country: United States
- State: California
- County: Kern
- Region: Tehachapi Mountains
- Founded: 1876
- Incorporated: August 13, 1909
- Named for: Kawaiisu for "hard climb"

Government
  - Type: Council-manager
  - Mayor: Joan Pogon-Cord
  - Mayor Pro Tem: Jeanette Pauer
  - City council members: Michael Davies; Phil Smith; Hannah Chung
  - City Manager: Greg Garrett

Area
  - City: 10.35 sq mi (26.81 km^{2})
  - Land: 10.25 sq mi (26.56 km^{2})
  - Water: 0.097 sq mi (0.25 km^{2}) 0.93%
- Elevation: 3,970 ft (1,210 m)

Population (2020)
  - City: 12,939
  - Estimate (2024): 11,114
  - Density: 1,262/sq mi (487.1/km^{2})
  - Urban: 17,298
- Time zone: UTC−8 (Pacific)
  - Summer (DST): UTC−7 (PDT)
- ZIP Code: 93561
- Area code: 661
- FIPS code: 06-78092
- GNIS feature IDs: 1652798, 2412041
- Website: liveuptehachapi.com

California Historical Landmark
- Reference no.: 643

Tehachapi (/təˈhætʃəpi/; Kawaiisu: Tihachipia, meaning "hard climb") is a city in Kern County, California, United States, in the Tehachapi Mountains, at an elevation of 3,970 feet (1,210 m), between the San Joaquin Valley and the Mojave Desert. Tehachapi is 35 miles (56 km) east-southeast of Bakersfield, and 20 miles (32 km) west of Mojave. According to the United States Census Bureau, the city has a total area of 10 square miles (26 km^{2}). As of the 2020 census, Tehachapi had a population of 12,939. The Tehachapi area is known for the nearby Tehachapi Loop (a popular railfan site), the Pacific Crest Trail and for the favorable weather conditions for the aerial sport of gliding.

== History ==
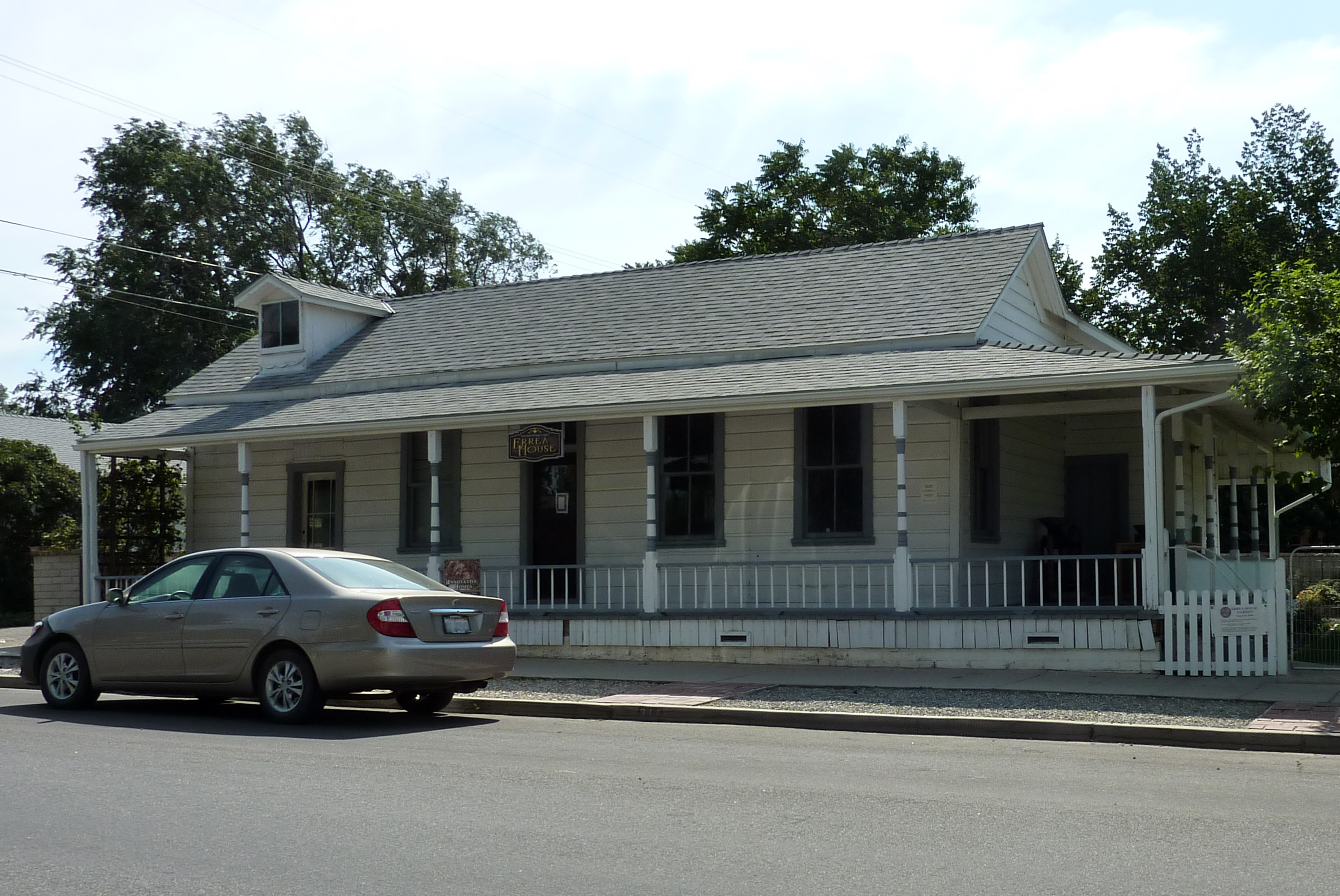
The Errea House, originally built in the early 1870s in Tehichipa, was moved to Tehachapi in 1900 and is now a museum; it is also listed on the NRHP.

The Kawaiisu people (also Nuwu ("people" in Kawaiisu), or Nuooah) are the Native American tribe whose homeland was the Tehachapi Valley, and seasonally the southern Sierra Nevada and Mojave Desert, for thousands of years.

One possibility for the origin of the name Tehachapi comes from the Kawaiisu language. It may be derived from the word for "hard climb" or tihachipia, according to the Tomi-Kahni Resource Center. The settlement has been formerly known and spelled as: Tehachapai; Tehachapa; Tehachepi; Tehachipi; and Summit Station. According to Yokuts informant Wahumchah, recorded by anthropologist Frank Forrest Latta, Tehachapi derives from a Yokuts-Ute amalgam, from Yokuts taheech[e] "oak-covered flat" + Ute pah' "water" (cl. Pah-ute, lit. 'Water Ute'). On an 1864 map of California, the name appears as Taheechepah.

The original settlement in the Tehachapi Valley, once called Williamsburg or 'Tehichipa', was founded in the 1860s. Now known as ‘Old Town’, it was located four miles west of present-day downtown Tehachapi and was an important station on the road linking the San Joaquin Valley with Southern California. It is now registered as California Historical Landmark #643 for being the oldest settlement in the Tehachapi Valley.

In 1869, Peter D. Greene, a gold prospector and rancher who originally arrived in 1856, was appointed postmaster of a new post office near the Tomlinson Stage Company station at Oak Creek to be called ‘Tehichipa’, which was the only post office in the area. In 1875, Greene founded the community of Greenwich three miles east of Williamsburg and was appointed postmaster there.

Under the leadership of civil engineer J.B. Harris, the Southern Pacific Railroad line through the Tehachapi Pass was completed in July 1876 and became the final link connecting San Francisco and Los Angeles. A telegraph office near the railroad tracks located one mile east of Greenwich was the first structure on the empty plain and would become the site of the Tehachapi Railroad Depot and the beginning of the downtown core. The depot is now on the National Register of Historic Places (NRHP)—and was the oldest building in downtown Tehachapi until it burned in June 2008. It has since been rebuilt using the original plans with only minor modifications to meet modern building codes. The new depot was dedicated on June 5, 2010.

The new railroad town was given the name of Tehachapi Summit, and Williamsburg and Greenwich, having been bypassed by the railroad, saw their population decline as many of the area's residents moved to the new town. In 1885, Greene moved the post office to Tehachapi Summit, the postal name was later changed to ‘Tehachapi’ in 1893. The town was incorporated on August 13, 1909.

=== 1952 Kern County earthquake ===
Tehachapi experienced the 7.3 magnitude 1952 Kern County earthquake on the White Wolf Fault. At the time, the earthquake was the largest in Southern California in the twentieth century and the largest since the 1872 Lone Pine earthquake. It was felt as far away as Reno, Nevada. Twelve people died in the quake and severe damage was done to buildings and rail lines in the area.

== Geography ==
=== Faults ===
Downtown Tehachapi is approximately 15 miles (24 km) from the White Wolf Fault, 6 miles (10 km) from the Garlock Fault and 30 miles (50 km) from the San Andreas Fault. The 1857 Fort Tejon earthquake on the San Andreas Fault had an estimated magnitude of 7.9 but there is no record of the local effects of this quake. The Garlock Fault last ruptured approximately 500 years ago.

=== Climate ===
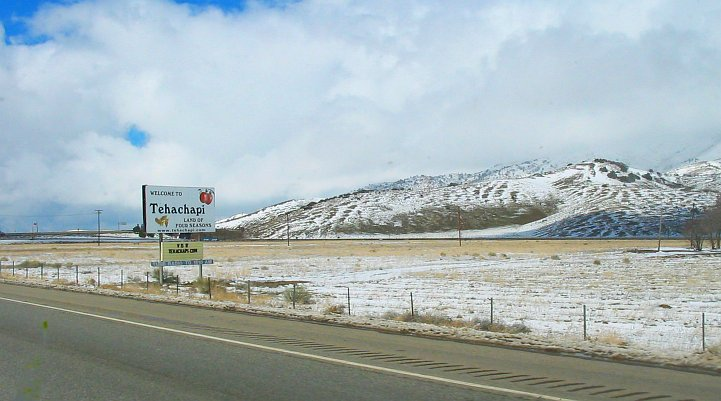
Looking northwest along State Route 58 in Tehachapi after a light dusting of snow

Tehachapi has a hot-summer mediterranean climate (Köppen Csa).

Tehachapi is known for its four-season climate. The wet season is generally November through May, although thunderstorms are common during the summer, especially over the nearby mountain peaks. Average temperatures range from 88 to 58 °F (31 to 14 °C) in July to 52 to 29 °F (11 to −2 °C) in January. The area typically collects 15 to 20 inches (38 to 51 cm) of snow each winter. There are an average of 31.1 days with highs of 91 °F (32.78 °C) or higher and an average of 94.8 days with lows of 31 °F (−0.6 °C) or lower annually.

Due to Tehachapi's close proximity to the Tehachapi Pass, which forces air up from the San Joaquin Valley through a narrow canyon into the mountains, the region is notably windy throughout the year. Many days out of the year experience strong wind gusts, usually coming from the Tehachapi Pass to the northwest. During winter, the strong winds can cause temperatures to feel significantly colder than they actually are. When strong high pressure systems are over the area, the winds often cease.

The highest recorded temperature was 105 °F (41 °C) on July 27, 1934. The lowest recorded temperature was −4 °F (−20 °C) on January 14, 1932, and December 21, 1967. Annual precipitation averages 11.08 inches (281 mm) and there is measurable precipitation on average of 42 days annually. The wettest year was 1983, with 27.77 inches (705 mm) and the driest year was 1989, with 4.3 inches (110 mm). The most precipitation in one month was 11.59 inches (294 mm) in March 1983. The most precipitation in 24 hours was 3.4 inches (86 mm) on March 1, 1983. The snowiest year was 1967, when 62 inches (160 cm) fell. The most snow in one month was 44 inches (110 cm) in January 1933.

Climate data for Tehachapi, California (Elevation 3,970ft)
Month	Jan	Feb	Mar	Apr	May	Jun	Jul	Aug	Sep	Oct	Nov	Dec	Year
Record high °F (°C)	75 (24)	78 (26)	81 (27)	89 (32)	97 (36)	104 (40)	105 (41)	104 (40)	102 (39)	96 (36)	85 (29)	81 (27)	105 (41)
Mean maximum °F (°C)	66 (19)	66 (19)	72 (22)	78 (26)	86 (30)	93 (34)	97 (36)	95 (35)	92 (33)	85 (29)	73 (23)	66 (19)	98 (37)
Mean daily maximum °F (°C)	51.3 (10.7)	54.0 (12.2)	56.0 (13.3)	62.6 (17.0)	70.6 (21.4)	79.7 (26.5)	87.1 (30.6)	86.3 (30.2)	80.4 (26.9)	70.8 (21.6)	59.6 (15.3)	52.3 (11.3)	67.6 (19.8)
Daily mean °F (°C)	40.4 (4.7)	42.8 (6.0)	44.7 (7.1)	50.0 (10.0)	56.7 (13.7)	65.6 (18.7)	72.1 (22.3)	70.6 (21.4)	64.2 (17.9)	55.7 (13.2)	47 (8)	41.3 (5.2)	54.3 (12.4)
Mean daily minimum °F (°C)	29.6 (−1.3)	31.6 (−0.2)	33.5 (0.8)	37.5 (3.1)	43.8 (6.6)	51.5 (10.8)	57.2 (14.0)	54.9 (12.7)	48.1 (8.9)	40.7 (4.8)	34.4 (1.3)	30.4 (−0.9)	41.1 (5.1)
Mean minimum °F (°C)	18 (−8)	19 (−7)	23 (−5)	27 (−3)	33 (1)	40 (4)	49 (9)	48 (9)	40 (4)	31 (−1)	23 (−5)	17 (−8)	14 (−10)
Record low °F (°C)	−4 (−20)	4 (−16)	9 (−13)	17 (−8)	26 (−3)	29 (−2)	36 (2)	32 (0)	22 (−6)	17 (−8)	6 (−14)	−4 (−20)	−4 (−20)
Average precipitation inches (mm)	1.85 (47)	1.82 (46)	1.94 (49)	0.93 (24)	0.43 (11)	0.12 (3.0)	0.11 (2.8)	0.25 (6.4)	0.32 (8.1)	0.48 (12)	1.13 (29)	1.70 (43)	11.08 (281.3)
Average snowfall inches (cm)	5.7 (14)	3.0 (7.6)	6.4 (16)	2.0 (5.1)	0.3 (0.76)	0 (0)	0 (0)	0 (0)	0 (0)	0 (0)	1.6 (4.1)	4.3 (11)	23.3 (58.56)
Source: The Western Regional Climate Center

== Demographics ==
The population was 14,414 at the 2010 census, up from 10,957 at the 2000 census.

Historical population
Census	Pop.	Note	%±
1890	255		—
1910	385		—
1920	458		19.0%
1930	736		60.7%
1940	1,264		71.7%
1950	1,685		33.3%
1960	3,161		87.6%
1970	4,211		33.2%
1980	4,126		−2.0%
1990	5,791		40.4%
2000	10,957		89.2%
2010	14,414		31.6%
2020	12,939		−10.2%
2024 (est.)	11,114	▼	−14.1%
U.S. Decennial Census

=== Racial and ethnic composition ===
Tehachapi city, California – Racial and ethnic composition Note: the US Census treats Hispanic/Latino as an ethnic category. This table excludes Latinos from the racial categories and assigns them to a separate category. Hispanics/Latinos may be of any race.
Race / Ethnicity (NH = Non-Hispanic)	Pop 2000	Pop 2010	Pop 2020	% 2000	% 2010	% 2020
White alone (NH)	5,497	7,123	6,183	50.17%	49.42%	47.79%
Black or African American alone (NH)	1,497	1,255	1,025	13.66%	8.71%	7.92%
Native American or Alaska Native alone (NH)	112	100	92	1.02%	0.69%	0.71%
Asian alone (NH)	77	222	278	0.70%	1.54%	2.15%
Native Hawaiian or Pacific Islander alone (NH)	9	12	21	0.08%	0.08%	0.16%
Other race alone (NH)	9	17	84	0.08%	0.12%	0.65%
Mixed race or Multiracial (NH)	173	219	519	1.58%	1.52%	4.01%
Hispanic or Latino (any race)	3,583	5,466	4,737	32.70%	37.92%	36.61%
Total	10,957	14,414	12,939	100.00%	100.00%	100.00%

=== 2020 census ===
As of the 2020 census, Tehachapi had a population of 12,939 and a population density of 1,261.6 inhabitants per square mile (487.1/km^{2}). The median age was 37.6 years. The age distribution was 19.2% under the age of 18, 7.5% aged 18 to 24, 36.0% aged 25 to 44, 25.2% aged 45 to 64, and 12.1% aged 65 or older. For every 100 females, there were 174.5 males, and for every 100 females age 18 and over, there were 200.0 males age 18 and over.

The racial makeup of Tehachapi was 53.3% White, 8.1% African American, 1.3% Native American, 2.3% Asian, 0.2% Pacific Islander, 23.2% from other races, and 11.7% from two or more races. Hispanic or Latino of any race were 36.6% of the population.

The census reported that 71.9% of the population lived in households and 28.1% were institutionalized. In addition, 69.1% of residents lived in urban areas, while 30.9% lived in rural areas.

There were 3,526 households, out of which 36.8% included children under the age of 18. Of all households, 44.4% were married-couple households, 7.5% were cohabiting couple households, 28.4% had a female householder with no spouse or partner present, and 19.7% had a male householder with no spouse or partner present. About 27.4% of households were one person, and 13.3% had someone living alone who was 65 years of age or older. The average household size was 2.64. There were 2,343 families (66.4% of all households).

There were 3,784 housing units at an average density of 369.0 units per square mile (142.5 units/km^{2}), of which 3,526 (93.2%) were occupied and 258 (6.8%) were vacant. Of occupied units, 56.6% were owner-occupied and 43.4% were occupied by renters. The homeowner vacancy rate was 0.9%, and the rental vacancy rate was 5.8%.

=== 2023 ACS 5-year estimate ===
In 2023, the US Census Bureau estimated that the median household income was $67,785, and the per capita income was $23,388. About 4.8% of families and 11.9% of the population were below the poverty line.

=== 2010 census ===
The 2010 United States census reported that Tehachapi had a population of 14,414. The population density was 1,445.7 inhabitants per square mile (558.2/km^{2}).

The racial makeup of Tehachapi was 9,426 (65.4%) White, 1,297 (9.0%) African American, 206 (1.4%) Native American, 238 (1.7%) Asian, 21 (0.1%) Pacific Islander, 2,725 (18.9%) from other races, and 501 (3.5%) from two or more races. Hispanic or Latino of any race were 5,466 persons (37.9%).

The Census reported that 8,487 people (58.9% of the population) lived in households, 6 (0%) lived in non-institutionalized group quarters, and 5,921 (41.1%) were institutionalized.

There were 3,121 households, out of which 1,199 (38.4%) had children under the age of 18 living in them, 1,504 (48.2%) were opposite-sex married couples living together, 418 (13.4%) had a female householder with no husband present, 181 (5.8%) had a male householder with no wife present. There were 194 (6.2%) unmarried opposite-sex partnerships, and 18 (0.6%) same-sex married couples or partnerships. 879 households (28.2%) were made up of individuals, and 428 (13.7%) had someone living alone who was 65 years of age or older. The average household size was 2.72. There were 2,103 families (67.4% of all households); the average family size was 3.34.

The population was spread out, with 2,599 people (18.0%) under the age of 18, 1,542 people (10.7%) aged 18 to 24, 5,891 people (40.9%) aged 25 to 44, 3,115 people (21.6%) aged 45 to 64, and 1,267 people (8.8%) who were 65 years of age or older. The median age was 34.4 years. For every 100 females, there were 234.8 males. For every 100 females age 18 and over, there were 283.0 males.

There were 3,539 housing units at an average density of 354.9 units per square mile (137.0 units/km^{2}), of which 1,841 (59.0%) were owner-occupied, and 1,280 (41.0%) were occupied by renters. The homeowner vacancy rate was 3.2%; the rental vacancy rate was 12.2%. 4,913 people (34.1% of the population) lived in owner-occupied housing units and 3,574 people (24.8%) lived in rental housing units.

== Economy ==
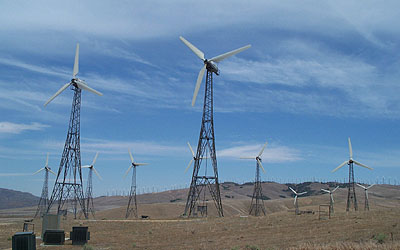
Wind turbines in the mountains

Tehachapi has historically been agrarian, with apples, peaches, grain, vegetables and hay grown year-round.

Wine grapes were grown in the area from the 19th century up until prohibition. A 2007 application to the Alcohol and Tobacco Tax and Trade Bureau (TTB) for the "Tehachapi/Cummings Valley AVA" was declined due to insufficient planted acreage. The Tehachapi Mountains American Viticultural Area was approved in 2020. It is approximately 58,000 acres (23,000 ha).

Roughly half of Tehachapi's water supply originates as groundwater that is replenished by local precipitation; the other half comes from the California Aqueduct.

The California Correctional Institution, a maximum security prison also known as Tehachapi State Prison, is in the area. Edwards Air Force Base lies 40 miles (64 km) to the east.

The Tehachapi area has been a center for renewable wind energy, containing 4,531 turbines that produce 3,200 megawatts of electricity as of 2019. In the same year, Amazon announced it would begin sourcing wind energy from Tehachapi as part of its goal to become carbon-neutral by 2040. The Tehachapi Energy Storage Project, commissioned in 2014, is located at Monolith Substation.

In 2019, a Walmart store opened in Tehachapi, which would provide up to 200 full and part-time jobs.

== Recreation and culture ==
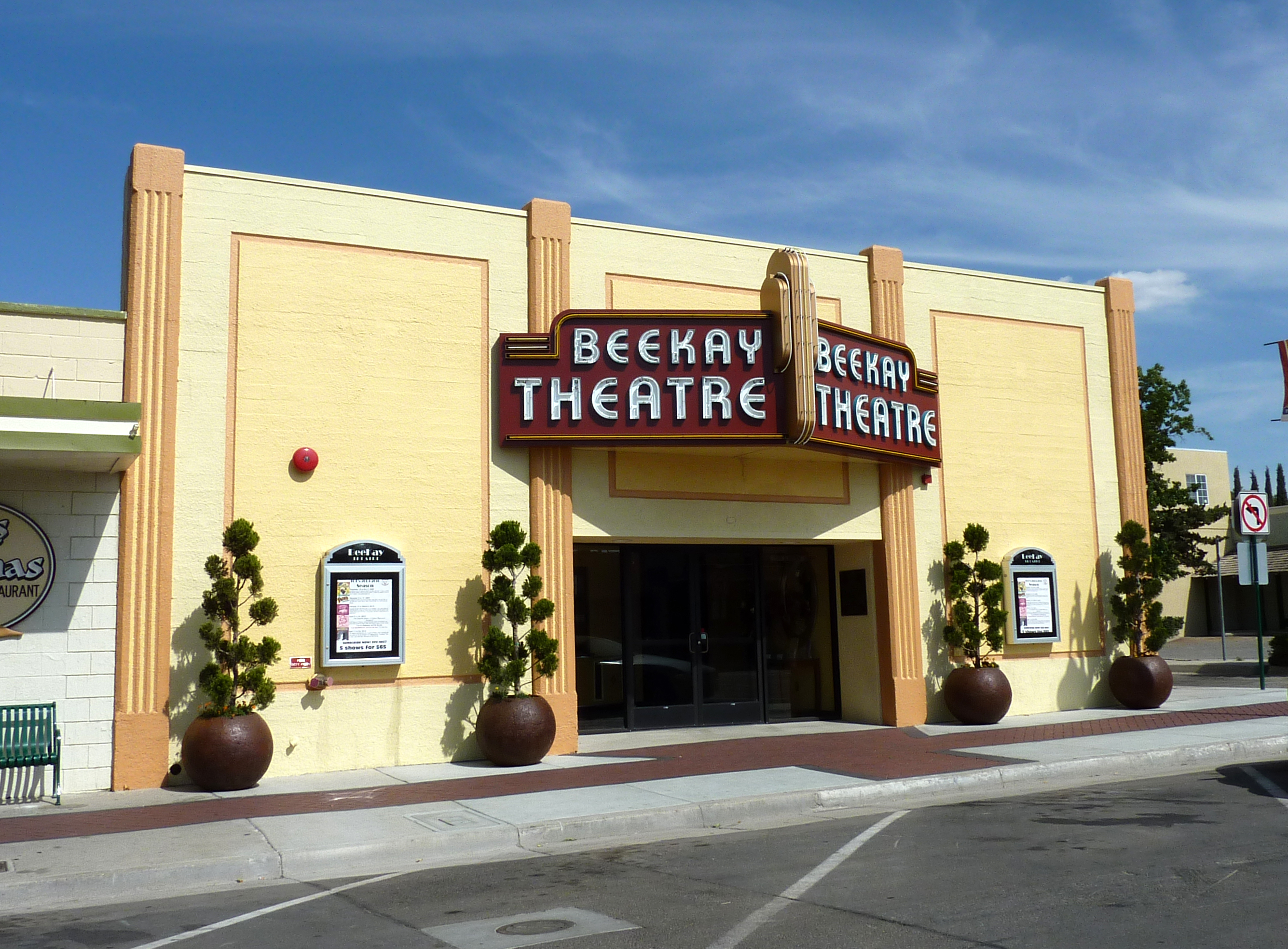
The BeeKay Theater is a historic theater converted into a live theater for the Tehachapi Community Theater in 2008.

The Tehachapi area is known for the nearby Tehachapi Loop (a popular railfan site), Tehachapi Pass Wind Farm, the Tehachapi Depot Museum, the Tehachapi Museum, the Tomo-Kahni State Historic Park and Tomi-Kahni Resource Center (Native American), and excellent air conditions for gliding. Tehachapi is on the Pacific Crest Trail. Ten miles (16 km) to the west, at Keene, is the National Chavez Center, established to share the legacy of Cesar Chavez.

=== Cycling ===
Tehachapi has a thriving and growing community for both mountain biking and road cycling. The Tehachapi Gran Fondo, a mass cycling event in September, was named Best Century by Cycle CA magazine two years in a row. The event offers several distance choices, the longest being around 100 miles (160 km) and 7,000 feet (2,100 m) of climbing through wind farms, vegetable farms, orchards and mountains.

Tehachapi Mountain Trails Association (TMTA) is a local group of riders and trail builders. The trails are often used for singletrack mountain biking. TMTA members are walkers, hikers, road bicyclists, mountain bikers, horseback riders, and outdoor enthusiasts interested in developing and preserving multi-use non motorized trails throughout the greater Tehachapi area.

=== Community orchestra and theater ===
Tehachapi boasts two local orchestras. The Tehachapi Community Orchestra, now called the Tehachapi Symphony Orchestra, was founded in 1997 by Joan Samara and Deborah Hand as an outgrowth of the Da Camera Players String Ensemble, and incorporated in 1998 by Gayel Pitchford. It performs 5 free-to-the public concerts each year, with familiar selections from the classical canon. This orchestra and its founders' vision were profiled in the Sept/Oct 2005 issue of Symphony Magazine. (See also The Tehachapi News October 12, 1997)

The Tehachapi Pops Orchestra (T-Pops), founded in 2006 by Deborah Hand, plays an eclectic blend of popular and jazz music, as well as original compositions. T-Pops performs 5 to 6 concerts each year. All are free to the public except for the Halloween concert held at the Beekay Theater with the local theater group, the Tehachapi Community Theater.

As of 2010, a local theater group, the Tehachapi Community Theater, performs in the restored downtown BeeKay Theater.

== Government ==
=== Law enforcement ===
The Tehachapi Police Department has been dissolved and reformed several times throughout the city's history. Initially created with the founding of the city, it was later disbanded. It was reestablished in 1955 and disbanded a second time. It was reestablished once more on November 27, 2006, with the swearing in of the Chief of Police, Jeff Kermode. As of 2024, the chief of police is Richard Standridge.

== Media ==
=== Newspapers ===
The city has several local news publications, including the Tehachapi News (since 1899) and The Loop.

== Transportation ==
The Tehachapi Park and Ride facility at 335 W Tehachapi Boulevard offers free parking and connections to Kern Transit and Amtrak Thruway buses. Kern Transit Route 100 goes from Lancaster to Bakersfield. The Amtrak Thruway bus provides connections to Oxnard and Santa Barbara.

Tehachapi Municipal Airport is located approximately one mile east of the Park and Ride facility.

== In popular culture ==
=== Film productions ===
Tehachapi has been host to productions by both Hollywood and independent filmmakers, as well as being frequently mentioned, particularly during the noir era.

Perhaps the first movie to be filmed in Tehachapi was The Lady of the Dugout (1918), which starred former outlaws Al and Frank Jennings playing themselves. The brother outlaws were well known to Americans of the time.

Referencing the local women's prison was a common manner in which Tehachapi received mention in noir film, including James M. Cain adaptations The Postman Always Rings Twice and Double Indemnity, in which Fred MacMurray's character tells of one woman who killed her husband: "All she collected was a three-to-ten stretch in Tehachapi (neither of Cain's novels mention Tehachapi)."

In The Maltese Falcon, Sam Spade (played by Humphrey Bogart) tells a female criminal and love interest, "Well, if you get a good break, you'll be out of Tehachapi in twenty years and you can come back to me then." In the book, the reference was not to Tehachapi but to San Quentin.

Nocturne (1946) featured a housemaid mysteriously referred to as the "Tehachapi Debutante," and 1948's The Hunted has a heroine fresh out of Tehachapi after four years for jewelry theft.

In The Story of Molly X (1949), Molly X is the leader of a San Francisco gang sent to Tehachapi for her role in a burglary attempt instead of San Quentin for execution. Most of the film then takes place at the prison, as Molly goes from being trouble to a model prisoner.

In 1001 Rabbit Tales, Bugs Bunny tells the sultan's son that Hansel and Gretel's witch was sent to Tehachapi.

In Star Trek Generations (1994), actors Patrick Stewart and William Shatner appear in a scene filmed in the Tehachapi mountains.

The Christina Applegate vehicle originally titled Tehachapi sends her character to Tehachapi because her lover is in prison here. The movie was eventually released under the title Across the Moon (1995).

The fourth season of the teen-geared television series, Endurance produced by the Discovery Kids Network was filmed in Tehachapi and aired from 2005 to 2006.

In Mac and Me (1988), after the characters state they have to "drive to Woolworth's in Palmdale" the next shot shows them driving up a dirt road through a Tehachapi wind farm. Similarly, Terminal Velocity (1994) has a fight sequence filmed on top of a hill in one of the farms.

Herbie: Fully Loaded (2005) shot a sequence at a wind farm and on Oak Creek Road, which winds through several farms.

Tehachapi was featured in several episodes of the Animal Planet reality show Pit Bulls and Parolees. The show focuses on the Villalobos Rescue Center and the pit bulls cared for by the center; in 2011, the rescue's application to use property owned in Tehachapi to expand rescue operations was denied by the Kern County Planning Department.

Other movies filmed in Tehachapi include Face to Face (2001), Fault (2002), Batman: Revenge (2003), The Gentleman Don La Mancha (2004), I.F.O. (Identified Flying Object) (1985), Motor Mansions (2005), The Legend of Bloody Mary (2008), The Grapes of Wrath (1940, featuring the scene at Keene Ranch), and The Hangover Part III (2013).

=== Music ===
The American Country Rock band Little Feat references Tehachapi in its song, Willin', written by its multi-instrumentalist band member Lowell George. The song has been covered numerous times, most notably by Linda Ronstadt on her 1974 album, Heart Like a Wheel, by Commander Cody and His Lost Planet Airmen on its 1975 eponymous album, and by Gregg Allman on his 2017 album, Southern Blood (released posthumously). The American singer Margo Cilker included a song called "Tehachapi" on her 2021 album Pohorylle.

=== Video game references ===
In the 1999 PlayStation video game Parasite Eve II, its main protagonist, Aya Brea, receives a map of Mojave region and is tasked to go to a fictional town of "Dryfield". The said map can be examined more thoroughly as an item of interest, and upon closer inspection it is revealed that the picture for the aforementioned map was actually based on real life satellite photo of the region, which shows real roads and infrastructure as they were existing in late 1990's, including portion of the real town of Bakersfield, with the fictional town of "Dryfield" being encircled in it, and its physical position on the picture shown in-game directly matching where Tehachapi is positioned in real life. The fictional location of "Dryfield" looks nothing like the real Tehachapi does in reality, but on the map picture that's being shown in the Parasite Eve II game it is directly placed where real Tehachapi is.

=== Condor mass perching ===
In May 2021, a resident came home after a holiday to find that about 15 to 20 condors had descended on her home. She said, "To have that many condors on my house was surreal; they can be destructive and messy. Nature is amazing!" The birds had ripped up decking, taken to a bath spa and knocked over several plants.

The Fish and Wildlife Service responded to tweets about the incident that the house is in a condor habitat where there are food sources and that sometimes condors use houses and decks as perch locations. Spokeswoman Pam Bierce said that as condors re-colonized historical ranges "people could increasingly find themselves interacting with the curious, intelligent and social birds".

Mickols' daughter Seana Quintero stated that all-in-all her mother was in "good stride and appreciating this once-in-a-lifetime annoyance but hoping they decide to leave her house alone soon".

== See also ==
- List of cities and towns in California
- California Historical Landmarks in Kern County
