= Shaver Lake, California =

Census-designated place in California, United States

Shaver Lake
- Unincorporated Community; Census Designated Place
- Location in Fresno County and the state of California

- Location in the United States
- Coordinates: 37°06′15″N 119°19′03″W
- Country: United States
- State: California
- County: Fresno

Government
  - State Senator: Shannon Grove (R)
  - State Assembly: David Tangipa (R)
  - U. S. Congress: Tom McClintock (R)

Area
  - Total: 34.564 sq mi (89.521 km^{2})
  - Land: 32.287 sq mi (83.623 km^{2})
  - Water: 2.277 sq mi (5.897 km^{2}) 6.59%
- Elevation: 5,627 ft (1,715 m)

Population (2020)
  - Total: 580
  - Density: 18/sq mi (6.9/km^{2})
- Time zone: UTC-8 (PST)
  - Summer (DST): UTC-7 (PDT)
- ZIP codes: 93634, 93642, 93664
- Area code: 559
- FIPS code: 06-71246
- GNIS feature IDs: 1659635, 2408722

Shaver Lake (formerly Musick Creek and Musick Creek Heights) is a census-designated place (CDP) in Fresno County, California, United States. The population was 580 at the 2020 census, down from 634 at the 2010 census. Shaver Lake is on the southwest end of the lake of the same name, 10 miles (16 km) east of New Auberry, at an elevation of 5,627 ft (1,715 m). The name honors C.B. Shaver, founder of the Fresno Flume and Irrigation Company that built the dam, creating the lake. The lake served as a mill pond for the Shaver Sawmill and the source for a flume that ran 65 miles (105 km) to Clovis. The original town of Shaver was inundated when the Thomas A. Edison Company purchased and enlarged the lake in 1919.

== Geography ==
According to the United States Census Bureau, the CDP has a total area of 34.6 square miles (90 km^{2}), of which 32.3 square miles (84 km^{2}) is land and 2.3 square miles (6 km^{2}), or 6.59%, is water.

== Climate ==
Shaver Lake has a warm-summer Mediterranean climate that is characterized by warm, dry summers with periodic thunderstorms, and cold, extremely snowy winters.

Climate data for Shaver Lake, California, 37.1260°N 119.2908°W, 5,374 feet (1,638 m)
Month	Jan	Feb	Mar	Apr	May	Jun	Jul	Aug	Sep	Oct	Nov	Dec	Year
Mean daily maximum °F (°C)	50.5 (10.3)	49.6 (9.8)	52.8 (11.6)	56.9 (13.8)	64.8 (18.2)	74.9 (23.8)	83.2 (28.4)	83.2 (28.4)	77.6 (25.3)	66.9 (19.4)	56.3 (13.5)	49.3 (9.6)	63.8 (17.7)
Daily mean °F (°C)	40.9 (4.9)	40.1 (4.5)	42.8 (6.0)	46.1 (7.8)	53.5 (11.9)	62.6 (17.0)	70.1 (21.2)	69.8 (21.0)	64.6 (18.1)	55.2 (12.9)	46.2 (7.9)	40.2 (4.6)	52.7 (11.5)
Mean daily minimum °F (°C)	31.4 (−0.3)	30.7 (−0.7)	32.7 (0.4)	35.3 (1.8)	42.3 (5.7)	50.2 (10.1)	57.1 (13.9)	56.4 (13.6)	51.7 (10.9)	43.4 (6.3)	36.1 (2.3)	31.0 (−0.6)	41.5 (5.3)
Average precipitation inches (mm)	7.46 (189)	6.46 (164)	6.07 (154)	3.34 (85)	2.03 (52)	0.60 (15)	0.27 (6.9)	0.07 (1.8)	0.27 (6.9)	2.00 (51)	3.04 (77)	5.89 (150)	37.5 (952.6)
Source: PRISM (spatially interpolated, 1991-2020 normals)

== Demographics ==
Historical population
Census	Pop.	Note	%±
2000	705		—
2010	634		−10.1%
2020	580		−8.5%
U.S. Decennial Census; 1860–1870 1880-1890; 1900 1910 1920; 1930 1940 1950; 1960 1970 1980; 1990 2000 2010

Shaver Lake first appeared as a census-designated place in the 2000 U.S. census.

=== 2020 ===
The 2020 United States census reported that Shaver Lake had a population of 580. The population density was 18.0 inhabitants per square mile (6.9/km^{2}). The racial makeup of Shaver Lake was 517 (89.1%) White, 0 (0.0%) African American, 7 (1.2%) Native American, 7 (1.2%) Asian, 2 (0.3%) Pacific Islander, 11 (1.9%) from other races, and 36 (6.2%) from two or more races. Hispanic or Latino of any race were 67 persons (11.6%).

The whole population lived in households. There were 263 households, out of which 42 (16.0%) had children under the age of 18 living in them, 175 (66.5%) were married-couple households, 13 (4.9%) were cohabiting couple households, 35 (13.3%) had a female householder with no partner present, and 40 (15.2%) had a male householder with no partner present. 52 households (19.8%) were one person, and 29 (11.0%) were one person aged 65 or older. The average household size was 2.21. There were 197 families (74.9% of all households).

The age distribution was 73 people (12.6%) under the age of 18, 31 people (5.3%) aged 18 to 24, 67 people (11.6%) aged 25 to 44, 177 people (30.5%) aged 45 to 64, and 232 people (40.0%) who were 65 years of age or older. The median age was 60.6 years. For every 100 females, there were 131.1 males.

There were 2,202 housing units at an average density of 68.2 units per square mile (26.3 units/km^{2}), of which 263 (11.9%) were occupied. Of these, 230 (87.5%) were owner-occupied, and 33 (12.5%) were occupied by renters.

=== 2010 ===
The 2010 United States census reported that Shaver Lake had a population of 634. The population density was 18.4 people per square mile (7.1/km^{2}). The racial makeup of Shaver Lake was 611 (96.4%) White, 0 (0.0%) African American, 5 (0.8%) Native American, 3 (0.5%) Asian, 0 (0.0%) Pacific Islander, 8 (1.3%) from other races, and 7 (1.1%) from two or more races. Hispanic or Latino of any race were 44 persons (6.9%).

The Census reported that 634 people (100% of the population) lived in households, 0 (0%) lived in non-institutionalized group quarters, and 0 (0%) were institutionalized.

There were 292 households, out of which 54 (18.5%) had children under the age of 18 living in them, 184 (63.0%) were opposite-sex married couples living together, 11 (3.8%) had a female householder with no husband present, 11 (3.8%) had a male householder with no wife present. There were 10 (3.4%) unmarried opposite-sex partnerships, and 3 (1.0%) same-sex married couples or partnerships. 72 households (24.7%) were made up of individuals, and 28 (9.6%) had someone living alone who was 65 years of age or older. The average household size was 2.17. There were 206 families (70.5% of all households); the average family size was 2.54.

The population was spread out, with 93 people (14.7%) under the age of 18, 34 people (5.4%) aged 18 to 24, 88 people (13.9%) aged 25 to 44, 266 people (42.0%) aged 45 to 64, and 153 people (24.1%) who were 65 years of age or older. The median age was 54.3 years. For every 100 females, there were 110.6 males. For every 100 females age 18 and over, there were 108.1 males.

There were 2,117 housing units at an average density of 61.4 per square mile (23.7/km^{2}), of which 292 were occupied, of which 236 (80.8%) were owner-occupied, and 56 (19.2%) were occupied by renters. The homeowner vacancy rate was 12.0%; the rental vacancy rate was 39.3%. 511 people (80.6% of the population) lived in owner-occupied housing units and 123 people (19.4%) lived in rental housing units.

=== 2000 ===
As of the census of 2000, the median income for a household in the CDP was $42,250, and the median income for a family was $51,250. Males had a median income of $40,956 versus $32,019 for females. The per capita income for the CDP was $24,695. About 10.3% of families and 10.3% of the population were below the poverty line, including 13.4% of those under age 18 and 5.7% of those age 65 or over.

== Education ==
Part of the CDP is served by the Big Creek Elementary School District, while another section is served by the Pine Ridge Elementary School District. All of the CDP is served by the Sierra Unified School District for grades 9-12 only.

== See also ==
- Shaver Lake
- Shaver Lake Railroad
- Burrough Valley
- Tollhouse, California
