= Jessie Lopez (disambiguation) =

Jessie Lopez (b. 1986) is a Filipino volleyball player.

Jessie Lopez may also refer to:

- Jessie Lopez (politician), an American politician
- Jessie Lopez De La Cruz (1919–2013), an American labor organizer
