= Clovis, California =

City in California, United States

- City
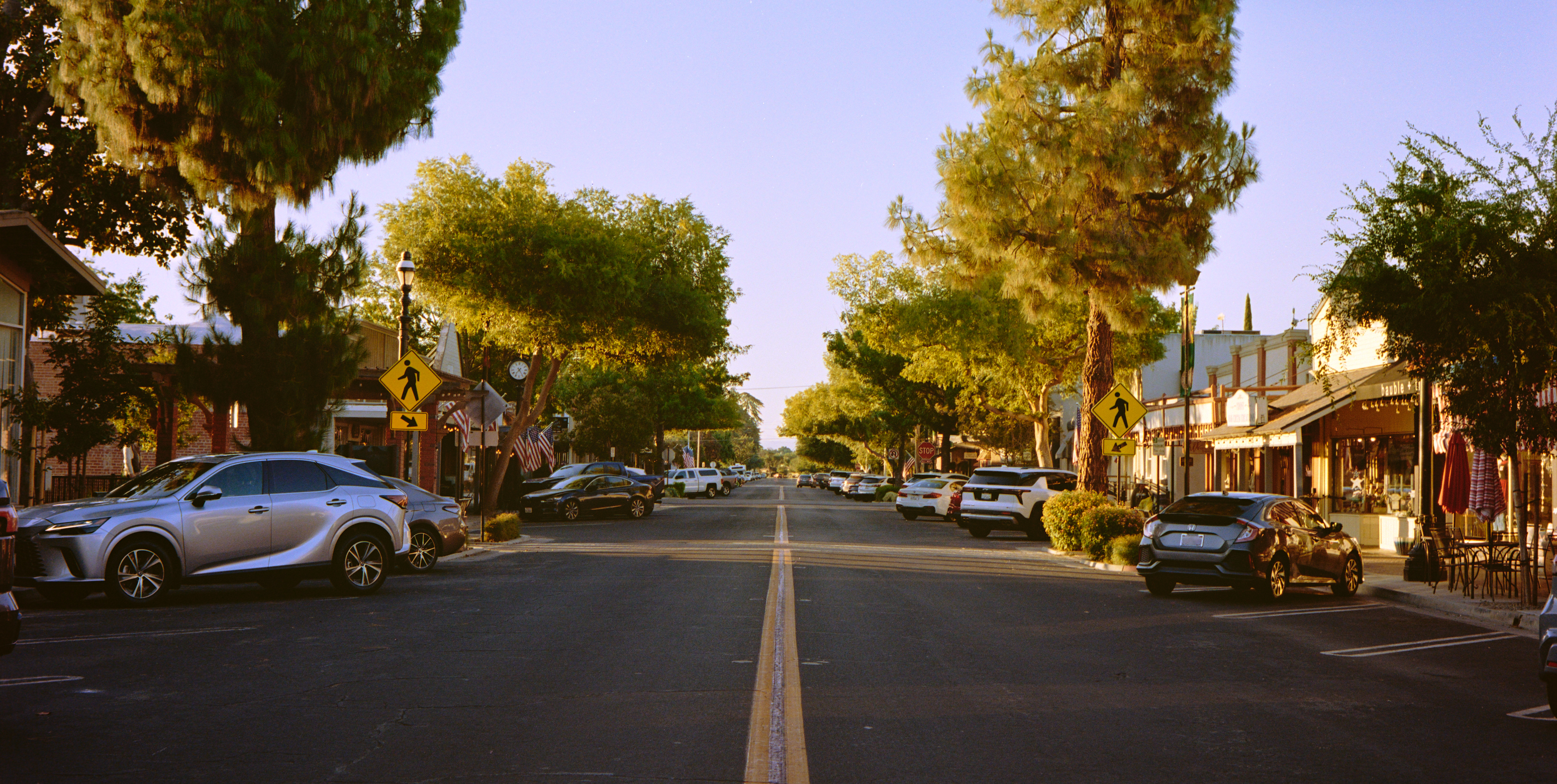
- Pollasky Avenue in Old Town Clovis

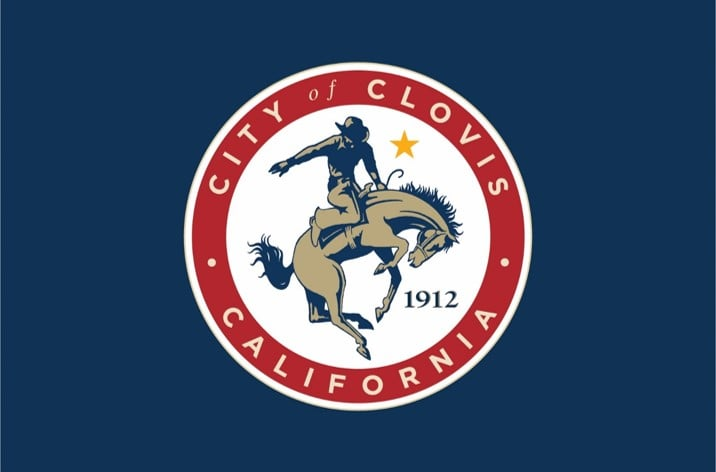
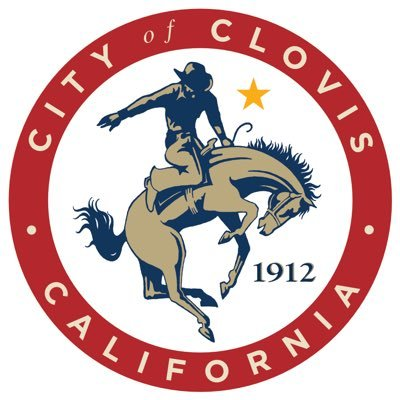
- Flag Seal
- Motto: "Gateway to the Sierras"
- Interactive map of Clovis, California
- Location in California Location in the United States
- Coordinates: 36°49′31″N 119°42′11″W
- Country: United States
- State: California
- County: Fresno
- Incorporated: February 27, 1912
- Named for: Clovis M. Cole; Clovis Station

Government
  - Type: Council–manager
  - Mayor: Vong Mouanoutoua
  - Mayor Pro Tem: Diane Pearce
  - State senator: Shannon Grove (R)
  - Assemblymember: David Tangipa (R)
  - U. S. rep.: Vince Fong (R)

Area
  - Total: 25.91 sq mi (67.10 km^{2})
  - Land: 25.79 sq mi (66.79 km^{2})
  - Water: 0.12 sq mi (0.31 km^{2}) 0%
- Elevation: 360 ft (110 m)

Population (2020)
  - Total: 120,124
  - Rank: 46th in California; 221st in the United States
  - Density: 4,657.9/sq mi (1,798.44/km^{2})
- Demonym: Clovisian
- Time zone: UTC−8 (Pacific)
  - Summer (DST): UTC−7 (PDT)
- ZIP codes: 93611–93613, 93619
- Area code: 559
- FIPS code: 06-14218
- GNIS feature IDs: 1656303, 2409488
- Website: clovisca.gov

Clovis is a city in Fresno County, California, United States. It was established in 1890 as a freight stop for the San Joaquin Valley Railroad by a group of Fresno businessmen and Michigan railroad speculator Marcus Pollasky. The railroad bought the land from two farmers and named the station after one of them, Clovis Cole. Pollasky then developed a town on the site, also named Clovis.

The completion of the lumber flume in 1894 led to the growth of the area around Clovis Station where a lumberyard and sawmill were built. Clovis was officially incorporated as a city in 1912. Today, Clovis celebrates its heritage as an American frontier town, known for its rodeo, Old Town Clovis historic district, and its motto "Clovis – A Way of Life."

In the 2020 census, the population was 120,124. Clovis is located 6.5 miles (10.5 km) northeast of downtown Fresno, at an elevation of 361 feet (110 m).

== History ==
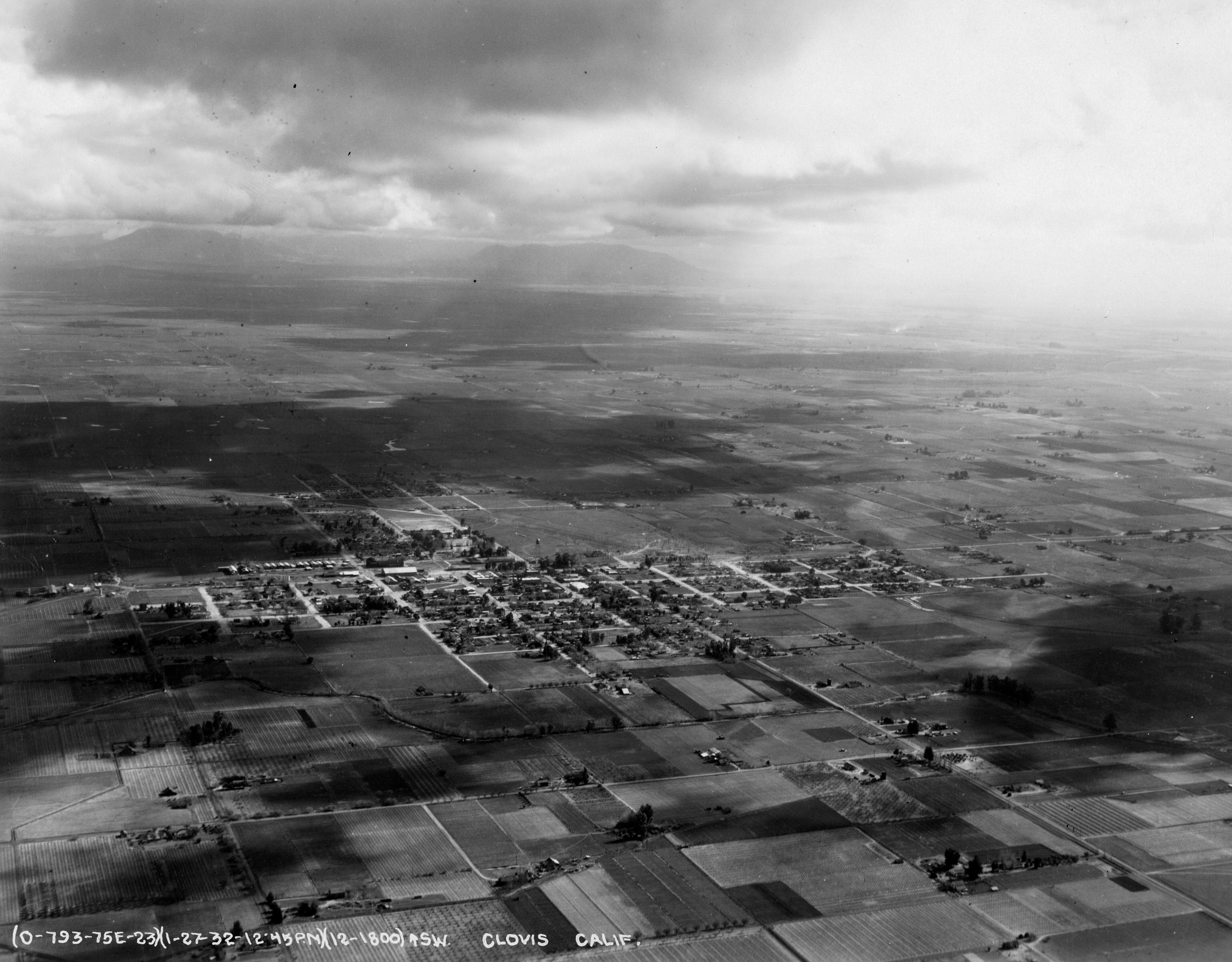
Clovis in 1932

The city of Clovis began as a freight stop along the San Joaquin Valley Railroad. Organized on January 15, 1890, by Fresno businessmen Thomas E. Hughes, Fulton Berry, Gilbert R. Osmun, H.D. Colson, John D. Gray, and William M. Williams, in partnership with Michigan railroad speculator Marcus Pollasky, the SJVRR began construction in Fresno on July 4, 1891, and reached the farmlands of Clovis M. Cole and George Owen by October of that year. The railroad purchased right-of-way from both farmers, half from each – the east side from Cole and the west side from Owen – and ran tracks up the borderline between the two properties. The railroad agreed to establish a station on the west side of the tracks and to call it "Clovis." The Clovis station, which was named after Clovis Cole, was positioned on the Owen side of the track.

Cole and Owen later sold land to Marcus Pollasky for the development of a townsite. Fresno civil engineer Ingvart Tielman mapped the townsite on behalf of Pollasky on December 29, 1891. The original townsite featured streets named for the officers and principal investors of the railroad: (Benjamin) Woodworth, (Marcus) Pollasky, Fulton (Berry), (Thomas) Hughes, (Gerald) Osmun, and (O. D.) Baron. The townsite, named "Clovis" after Clovis Station by Pollasky, was laid out on what was originally Owen's land.

The railroad was completed as far as the town of Hamptonville (now Friant) on the banks of the San Joaquin River, just 26 miles (42 km) from its point of origin in Fresno. Articles of Incorporation for the San Joaquin Valley Railroad indicate that the corporation intended to build 100 miles (160 km) of track, including sidings and spurs, through the agricultural acreage east of Fresno, then north to the timber and mineral resources of the Sierra foothills. At the time, Hamptonville was called "Pollasky". A celebration of the completion of track-laying was held at the Pollasky terminus on the Wednesday before Thanksgiving of 1891 with a reported 3,000 Fresnans attending. The railroad began official operation in January 1892.

The first year of operation of the railroad coincided with the beginnings of a deep national economic decline. Farmers were unable to get a profitable return on their crops, banks and railroads failed nationwide. The SJVRR was unable to generate sufficient revenues to pay its debt, was leased to the Southern Pacific Railroad and subsequently bought by SPRR in 1893. By reducing the railroad's schedule of operation and trimming costs, the Southern Pacific was able to turn a small profit in the first years after its acquisition.

At the same time that the railroad was being planned, a group of Michigan lumbermen began acquiring thousands of acres of timber in the Sierra Nevada about 75 miles (121 km) northeast of Fresno and founded the Fresno Flume and Irrigation Company in 1891. A dam was built across Stevenson Creek to create a lake that would enable them to move freshly cut timber to a mill beside the lake. They then constructed a 42-mile (68 km), 25-foot-high (7.6 m), V-shaped flume that started at the foot of the dam. As lumber was rough-cut at the mill, it was loaded into the flume and propelled by water to a planing mill east of the Clovis railroad station, where the Clovis Rodeo and Clark Intermediate School sit today. The lumber mill and yard had its own network of rails to move lumber around the yard and to connect with the SJVRR just south of Clovis station.

The completion in 1894 of the lumber flume and commencement of mill operations provided the impetus for further development of the area around the Clovis Station. The town began to take shape as lumber yard employees built homes close to their employment. Service businesses, churches, and schools became necessary, and the town was begun. Clovis's first post office opened in 1895. An 1896 newspaper article describes the town as having a population approaching 500 citizens.

Clovis was incorporated as a city in February 1912. Principal streets in the town center were named for the railroad's officers. Fulton Street was later named Front Street, then Main Street, and is now Clovis Avenue.

The lumber mill burned in 1914 and was not rebuilt. The grounds are now occupied by Clark Intermediate School and the Clovis Rodeo Grounds. Clovis has a long history as a western town known for its slogan, "Clovis – A Way of Life". Since 1914, the Clovis Rodeo has been held on the last weekend in April, with a parade on Saturday morning, followed by the rodeo that afternoon and all day Sunday. Also contributing to the "Clovis way of life" are a number of street festivals, including Big Hat Days, ClovisFest, and the weekly Friday Night Farmer's Market held between mid-May and mid-September every year.

The last surviving structure built by the railroad is a depot now located near the site of the original Clovis Station. The earliest photos, from about 1910, show the depot situated in front of the Tarpey winery south of the intersection of Ashlan and Clovis Avenues. In 1999 it was moved to its present location in the town's center, at the northeast corner of Clovis Avenue and Fourth Street, and was restored by the Clovis Big Dry Creek Historical Society with financing, labor, and materials donated by local businesses and contractors.

Marcus Pollasky was a lawyer, born in Michigan, living in Chicago just before he came to Fresno. Throughout his life he tried to create several projects similar to the SJVRR, including projects in Eureka, California, Virginia, Michigan, and Oklahoma. Few were ever actually built. In 1896, Pollasky sued Collis P. Huntington in Los Angeles courts over the money he lost in Fresno, "while engaged in a joint venture with the defendant, Huntington". It has long been speculated that Pollasky was an agent of the Southern Pacific, and this "joint venture" suit seems to prove that point.

Many buildings in the town core have been renovated. Older storefronts on Clovis Avenue, the main street running through town, have been restored and new buildings have been designed with facades that resemble those found in the early 20th century. The historic center has been reborn as "Old Town Clovis".

== Geography ==
Clovis, California

Climate chart (precipitation, max. and min. temperature)
J	F	M	A	M	J	J	A	S	O	N	D
2.2 54 32	2.1 61 41	2.2 66 45	0.8 74 48	0.4 83 55	0.2 91 61	0 97 66	0 95 65	0.3 89 60	0.7 78 52	1.1 63 42	1.3 53 29
- █ Average max. and min. temperatures in °F
- █ Precipitation totals in inches
- Source: Weather.com / NWS
Metric conversion
J	F	M	A	M	J	J	A	S	O	N	D
55 12 0	54 16 5	56 19 7	19 23 9	9.9 28 13	5.8 33 16	0.3 36 19	0.3 35 18	6.6 32 16	17 26 11	28 17 6	34 12 −2
- █ Average max. and min. temperatures in °C
- █ Precipitation totals in mm

According to the United States Census Bureau, the city has a total area of 23.28 square miles (60.29 km^{2}), all land.

Clovis is situated midway between Los Angeles and San Francisco, bordering Fresno, in the agriculturally rich San Joaquin Valley. Lying at the foot of the Sierra Nevada Mountain Range, which includes Yosemite, Kings Canyon, and Sequoia National Parks, Clovis has been known as "Gateway to the Sierras" since its incorporation in 1912.

The formation of alluvial fans in this part of the San Joaquin Valley has led to a rather flat regional geography. The Clovis area has active and potentially active seismic fault zones. The elevation of Clovis is approximately 355 feet (108 m) above mean sea datum According to the Flood Hazard Boundary Map produced by the U.S. Department of Housing and Urban Development, part of Clovis is within the 100-year flood zone, such as some of the area near the Clovis Towne Center. The groundwater flow in Clovis is generally to the southwest.

== Demographics ==
Historical population
Census	Pop.	Note	%±
1920	1,157		—
1930	1,316		13.7%
1940	1,626		23.6%
1950	2,766		70.1%
1960	5,546		100.5%
1970	13,856		149.8%
1980	33,021		138.3%
1990	50,323		52.4%
2000	68,468		36.1%
2010	95,631		39.7%
2020	120,124		25.6%
2025 (est.)	129,121	▲	7.5%
U.S. Decennial Census

Clovis city, California – Racial and ethnic composition Note: the US Census treats Hispanic/Latino as an ethnic category. This table excludes Latinos from the racial categories and assigns them to a separate category. Hispanics/Latinos may be of any race.
Race / Ethnicity (NH = Non-Hispanic)	Pop 2000	Pop 2010	Pop 2020	% 2000	% 2010	% 2020
White alone (NH)	46,186	55,021	57,916	67.46%	57.53%	48.21%
Black or African American alone (NH)	1,207	2,360	2,993	1.76%	2.47%	2.49%
Native American or Alaska Native alone (NH)	679	754	738	0.99%	0.79%	0.61%
Asian alone (NH)	4,322	9,965	15,147	6.31%	10.42%	12.61%
Pacific Islander alone (NH)	75	187	270	0.11%	0.20%	0.22%
Other Race alone (NH)	131	153	666	0.19%	0.16%	0.55%
Mixed race or Multiracial (NH)	1,992	2,677	5,800	2.91%	2.80%	4.83%
Hispanic or Latino (any race)	13,876	24,514	36,594	20.27%	25.63%	30.46%
Total	68,468	95,631	120,124	100.00%	100.00%	100.00%

=== 2020 ===
The 2020 United States census reported that Clovis had a population of 120,124. The population density was 4,726.5 inhabitants per square mile (1,824.9/km^{2}). The racial makeup of Clovis was 55.7% White, 2.8% African American, 1.4% Native American, 13.0% Asian, 0.3% Pacific Islander, 11.8% from other races, and 15.1% from two or more races. Hispanic or Latino of any race were 30.5% of the population.

The census reported that 99.6% of the population lived in households, 0.2% lived in non-institutionalized group quarters, and 0.2% were institutionalized.

There were 42,130 households, out of which 38.4% included children under the age of 18, 52.5% were married-couple households, 6.6% were cohabiting couple households, 25.8% had a female householder with no partner present, and 15.0% had a male householder with no partner present. 21.1% of households were one person, and 9.9% were one person aged 65 or older. The average household size was 2.84. There were 30,780 families (73.1% of all households).

The age distribution was 26.2% under the age of 18, 9.0% aged 18 to 24, 27.0% aged 25 to 44, 23.0% aged 45 to 64, and 14.7% who were 65 years of age or older. The median age was 36.1 years. For every 100 females, there were 93.0 males.

There were 43,954 housing units at an average density of 1,729.5 units per square mile (667.8 units/km^{2}), of which 42,130 (95.9%) were occupied. Of these, 64.0% were owner-occupied, and 36.0% were occupied by renters.

In 2023, the US Census Bureau estimated that the median household income was $100,360, and the per capita income was $43,774. About 5.4% of families and 7.4% of the population were below the poverty line.

=== 2010 ===
At the 2010 census Clovis had a population of 95,631. The population density was 4,108.2 inhabitants per square mile (1,586.2/km^{2}). The racial makeup of Clovis was 67,758 (70.9%) White, 2,618 (2.7%) African American, 1,320 (1.4%) Native American, 10,233 (10.7%) Asian, 218 (0.2%) Pacific Islander, 8,857 (9.3%) from other races, and 4,627 (4.8%) from two or more races. There were 24,514 Hispanic or Latino residents, of any race (25.6%).

The census reported that 95,243 people (99.6% of the population) lived in households, 130 (0.1%) lived in non-institutionalized group quarters, and 258 (0.3%) were institutionalized.

There were 33,419 households, 13,718 (41.0%) had children under the age of 18 living in them, 17,975 (53.8%) were opposite-sex married couples living together, 4,554 (13.6%) had a female householder with no husband present, 1,889 (5.7%) had a male householder with no wife present. There were 1,985 (5.9%) unmarried opposite-sex partnerships, and 198 (0.6%) same-sex married couples or partnerships. 7,008 households (21.0%) were one person and 2,721 (8.1%) had someone living alone who was 65 or older. The average household size was 2.85. There were 24,418 families (73.1% of households); the average family size was 3.32.

The age distribution was 26,851 people (28.1%) under the age of 18, 9,572 people (10.0%) aged 18 to 24, 25,542 people (26.7%) aged 25 to 44, 23,559 people (24.6%) aged 45 to 64, and 10,107 people (10.6%) who were 65 or older. The median age was 34.1 years. For every 100 females, there were 93.2 males. For every 100 females age 18 and over, there were 89.5 males.

There were 35,306 housing units at an average density of 1,516.7 per square mile (585.6/km^{2}), of which 33,419 were occupied, 20,804 (62.3%) by the owners and 12,615 (37.7%) by renters. The homeowner vacancy rate was 2.3%; the rental vacancy rate was 6.4%. 60,767 people (63.5% of the population) lived in owner-occupied housing units and 34,476 people (36.1%) lived in rental housing units.

== Economy ==
=== Top employers ===
According to the city's 2024 Comprehensive Annual Financial Report, the top employers in the city are:

#	Employer	# of Employees
1	Clovis Unified School District	5,228
2	Clovis Community Hospital	2,988
3	County of Fresno	1,874
4	Walmart	890
5	City of Clovis	767
6	Wawona Frozen Foods	735
7	Anlin Industries	526
8	Costco	435
9	Target	406
10	Cen Cal Builders	350

=== Cityscape ===
The Sierra Vista Mall is a 78-acre (32 ha) enclosed regional shopping center anchored by Target, Kohl's, Sierra Vista Cinemas 16, and MB2 Indoor Raceway.

Public transportation within the city is provided by Clovis Transit; some areas also are served by Fresno Area Express, providing connections to Fresno.

== Education ==
The majority of the territory is served by the Clovis Unified School District. Portions of Clovis extend into the Fresno Unified School District Sanger Unified School District.

=== Clovis Unified School District ===
- Elementary schools:
  - Boris, Bud Rank, Cedarwood, Century, Clovis, Cole, Copper Hills, Cox, Dry Creek, Fancher Creek, Fort Washington, Freedom, Fugman, Garfield, Gettysburg, Jefferson, Liberty, Lincoln, Maple Creek, Mickey Cox, Miramonte, Mountain View, Nelson, Pinedale, Red Bank, Reagan Elementary, Riverview, Sierra Vista, Tarpey, Temperance-Kutner, Valley Oak, Weldon, Harold L. Woods, Red Bank
- Middle schools:
  - Clark Intermediate, Kastner Intermediate, Alta Sierra Intermediate, Reyburn Intermediate, Granite Ridge Intermediate
- High schools:
  - Buchanan High School, Clovis East High School, Clovis High School, Clovis West High School, Clovis North High School, Enterprise High School, Excel High School, Gateway High School, Center for Advanced Research and Technology

=== Colleges ===
- Clovis Community College
- San Joaquin College of Law
- California Health Sciences University College of Osteopathic Medicine
- California Health Sciences University College of Pharmacy

=== Private schools ===
- Charlie Keyan Armenian Community School

=== Public libraries ===
Fresno County Public Library operates the Clovis Regional Library.

== Notable people ==
- Ryan Beatty, pop singer
- Connor Brogdon (born 1995), Cleveland Guardians baseball player
- Tyler Clutts, former NFL fullback, attended Clovis High, class of 2003
- Chris Colfer, singer, actor and author, best known for portraying the role of Kurt Hummel on Glee and writing the Land of Stories book series.
- Terry Cooney, American League umpire, 1974–92
- Colby Covington, mixed martial artist, former UFC Interim Welterweight Champion
- Zubin Damania, MD, founder of Turntable Health, a direct primary care clinic in Las Vegas
- Bryson DeChambeau, 2020 and 2024 U.S. Open golf champion
- Jason Donald, former MLB infielder
- Jordan Feliz, Christian pop singer/songwriter
- Zack Follett, former linebacker for the Detroit Lions; attended Clovis High
- Matt Giordano, American football safety who is currently a physical education teacher at Buchanan High School
- Aaron Hill, actor, best known for his work on the ABC Family TV show, Greek
- Valarie Kaur, documentary filmmaker, civil rights activist, and Sikh interfaith leader
- Eric Kendricks, linebacker for the Minnesota Vikings
- Daryle Lamonica, former quarterback for the Buffalo Bills and Oakland Raiders
- Alysa Liu, 2026 Winter Olympics figure skating champion
- Sam Long (born 1995), San Francisco Giants baseball player
- Mary Loveless, immunologist
- Kendall Milton, college football player for the Georgia Bulldogs
- Dylan Noble, suicidal victim who was fatally shot by Fresno Police in June 2016
- Garrett Olson, former MLB pitcher; attended Buchanan High
- Jenna Prandini, track and field athlete and Olympian
- PJ Raval, filmmaker
- Aaron Ruell, Kip in Napoleon Dynamite
- Larissa Schuster, convicted murderer
- Kate Scott, sportscaster, play-by-play announcer for the Philadelphia 76ers
- John Taylor, former wide receiver for the San Francisco 49ers
- Jason Von Flue, professional mixed martial artist; UFC and The Ultimate Fighter, season 2 veteran
- Justin Wilson, professional MLB pitcher for eight MLB teams; attended Buchanan High
- Jade Avedisian, professional race car driver for Toyota Gazoo Racing
- Corey Day, professional race car driver for Hendrick Motorsports in the NASCAR O'Reilly Auto Parts Series

== See also ==
- Clovis Independent
- Burrough Valley
- Tollhouse, California
- Shaver Lake
