= Pineridge =

Pineridge may refer to:

- Pineridge, Bahamas
- Pineridge, Calgary, Alberta, Canada
- Pineridge, California, United States
