= List of killings by law enforcement officers in the United States, 2002 =

This is a list of people reported killed by non-military law enforcement officers in the United States in 2002, whether in the line of duty or not, and regardless of reason or method. The listing documents the occurrence of a death, making no implications regarding wrongdoing or justification on the part of the person killed or officer involved. Killings are arranged by date of the incident that caused death. Different death dates, if known, are noted in the description. The table below lists 139 people.

== 2002 ==
Date	Name (age) of deceased	Race	State (city)	Description
2002-12-31	Lance Morton (43)	Unknown	Michigan (Garden City)	
2002-12-31	Michael Wetter (22)	Unknown	California (Riverside)	
2002-12-31	Robert J. Nusbaum (34)	White	Nevada (Las Vegas)	
2002-12-31	Howard J. Henry (24)	Unknown	Colorado (Longmount)	
2002-12-28	Donald Chronister (49)	Unknown	Oklahoma (Roland)	
2002-12-28	Ray H. Crow (77)	Unknown	Arkansas (Rogers)	
2002-12-27	Robert C. Guy (27)	Unknown	North Carolina (Franklinton)	
2002-12-27	Judd E. Daniels (31)	Unknown	Montana (Great Falls)	
2002-12-26	Michael A. Frenette (36)	White	Florida (St. Petersburg)	
2002-12-25	Michael Montagna (45)		Maine (Jefferson)	
2002-12-24	Michael Ellerbe (12)	Black	Pennsylvania (Uniontown)	
2002-12-22	Edward Pundsack		Wisconsin (Milwaukee)	
2002-12-20	Tammy Sanford (28)	White	Texas (Houston)	
2002‑12‑20	Bruce James Weigel		Wyoming (south of Cheyenne)	Died of "mechanical asphyxiation" as a result of arresting state trooper putting weight on Weigel's back while handcuffing Weigel on the ground. The state of Wyoming settled a federal lawsuit for $500,000 in the case.
2002-12-14	Jimmy Sum (44)	Asian	California (San Gabriel)	
2002-12-12	James Lee Ham III		Georgia (Tift County)	Died from injuries following police use of a PIT maneuver on suspect's vehicle.
2002-12-09	Gino Dellacqua (45)	Latino	California (Lake View Terrace)	
2002-12-05	Jose Diaz (26)	Latino	California (Boyle Heights)	
2002-12-05	James E. Taylor	Black	Kentucky (Louisville)	Fifty-year-old African-American Taylor was shot multiple times in his apartment on St. Catherine Blvd. in Old Louisville, his hands cuffed behind his back. The two arresting LMPD officers alleged that he'd tried to cut them with a box-cutter he apparently had in his back pocket. Officers were acquitted of all charges.
2002-11-23	Koron Butler (24)		Michigan (Detroit)	
2002-11-23	Rachell M. Taylor (28)	White	Texas (Houston)	
2002-11-22	Joshua Blunt (22)	White	California (Koreatown)	
2002-11-20	Robert Mitchell (40)	Black	California (Sun Village)	
2002-11-17	Kenny Fuller (37)	Black	California (Florence)	
2002-11-17	Michael R. Barrett (25)		Texas (Houston)	
2002-11-15	Seth Landon (35)	White	California (Wilmington)	
2002-11-10	Joseph Queen (23)	Black	California (Carson)	
2002-11-04	Rodney Ali Baldwin (24)	Black	Texas (Houston)	
2002-10-27	Everado Torres (24)		California (Madera)	A Madera Police officer shot Torres as he sat, handcuffed, in the back of a police car. He had been arrested for resisting as police tried to quiet a loud party. The officer reported that she had intended to reach for her Taser but grabbed her firearm instead.
2002-10-13	Alberto Davila (26)	Latino	California (Hollywood)	
2002-10-11	Dawn Rae Nelson		Arizona (Chandler)	Nelson was shot by officer Dan Lovelace. According to Lovelace, Nelson was driving towards him with her car, but prosecutors said they believed that Lovelace's life was not in danger when he shot Nelson. Lovelace was charged with second-degree murder, and was found not guilty. He was fired from the Chandler Police Department.
2002-10-06	Nathan Rossback (40)	Unknown	California (Westchester)	
2002-10-05	Maurice Lizotte (63)		Vermont (Rochester)	
2002-10-01	Mark Boyce (37)		Michigan (Detroit)	
2002-09-28	Christopher Lee (33)		Ohio (Columbus)	
2002-09-27	Ki Yang (46)	Asian	Minnesota (St. Paul)	
2002-09-23	David Miranda (28)	Latino	California	
2002-09-22	Brandon Lee Lett (21)	Black	Florida (Miami)	
2002-09-21	Francisco Ponce (22)		Iowa (Onawa)	
2002-09-19	Christopher J. Worden (27)		Arizona (Phoenix)	
2002-09-08	Evaline Barros-Capeda		Massachusetts (Boston)	
2002-09-01	Jamil Moore (22)		New York (Cararsie, Brooklyn)	
2002-08-31	Paul Angel (55)		New York (Bensonhurst, Brooklyn)	
2002-08-27	Ricardo Mason (16)		Ohio (Cleveland)	
2002-08-23	Robert Klingman (21)	White	California (Lancaster)	
2002-08-15	Eric Daniel Foster (25)	Black	California (Fresno)	Foster was unarmed.
2002-8-12	Arnold, Christopher "Winks"		Pennsylvania (York)	Arnold died of positional asphyxiation after being beaten by police in his front yard, hogtied, and placed face down in the police wagon. Officers were responding to a reports of Arnold, a schizophrenic, walking around and talking to himself.
2002-08-08	Jeffrey Hoplins (23)		Ohio (Cleveland)	
2002-08-08	John Chavez (34)	Latino	California (Sierra Madre)	
2002-08-06	Ronald M. Cunningham (41)		Texas (Houston)	
2002-08-05	Tessa Hardeman (35)		Georgia (Atlanta)	Tessa Hardeman, who was an alleged prostitute, allegedly pepper-sprayed and stabbed the officer who was trying to arrest her for solicitation. She was shot and killed.
2002-08-01	Martha Donald (60)		Minnesota (Minneapolis)	Killed in a shootout with officer Melissa Jayne Schmidt, who also died.
2002-07-28	Unnamed teenager (16)		Michigan (Detroit)	
2002-07-21	Salome Pineda Garvajal (41)	Hispanic	Texas (Houston)	
2002-07-19	Leonard Michael Mosqueda (38)	Hispanic	Texas (Houston)	
2002-07-15	Christopher Bernard Menifee (23)	Black	Texas (Houston)	
2002-07-11	Melvin "Mario" Alejandro Romero (20)	Hispanic	Texas (Houston)	
2002-07-06	Cecil Menifield (37)	Black	California (Los Angeles)	
2002-07-02	LaVeta Jackson		Massachusetts (Boston)	
2002-07-02	Michael Bilderrain (19)	Latino	California (Pacoima)	
2002-06-28	Joseph P. Finley (20)		Ohio (Cleveland)	
2002-06-20	Sean McHugh (32)	White	California (Tarzana)	
2002-06-17	Connie Pearsall (26)		Washington (Oak Harbor)	
2002-06-14	Feras B. Abdelrazzaq (29)	White	California (San Dimas)	
2002-06-12	James Brandon Fields (22)	White	Texas (Houston)	
2002-06-12	Daniel Damian Jr. (20)	Hispanic	Texas (Houston)	
2002-06-12	Carlos Alberto Ramirez (24)	Hispanic	Texas (Houston)	
2002-06-11	Jason Mitchell (33)	Black	California (Chesterfield Square)	
2002-06-11	Sophia King (23)		Texas (Austin)	
2002-06-09	Waseem Jung (19)	Asian	Texas (Houston)	
2002-06-06	Stephon K. Moore (39)		Ohio (Cleveland)	
2002-06-?	unknown	Unknown	Texas (Dallas)	
2002-05-31	Antonio Pineiro (48)	Latino	California (Long Beach)	Pineiro entered a supermarket with firearms and opened fire at random, killing two people and wounding four others. Responding law enforcement officers fatally shot Pineiro.
2002-05-29	Laron Ball		Wisconsin (Milwaukee)	Ball was shot and killed in the Milwaukee safety building at his homicide trial. As the verdicts were read, Ball jumped over a table and the jury box to a window but failed to smash it open. Two sheriff's deputies tackled him, but he got hold of their guns, and one deputy, Mike Witkowski, was shot in the leg before a Milwaukee police detective shot and killed Ball.
2002-05-25	Mark Charles Volpa, Jr. (21)		California (Auberry)	A SWAT team from Fresno Police, Fresno County Sheriff's Office, and Clovis Police surrounded Volpa in his camper. They negotiated for several hours for his surrender. Officers say he was shot and killed when he exited the camper with an assault rifle. He had been sought for killing a Fresno County Sheriff's deputy May 19.
2002-05-24	Marcus Alexander (26)		Texas (Houston)	
2002-05-21	Nelson Santiago		Massachusetts (Boston)	
2002-05-19	Fermin Castro (34)	Latino	California (Winnetka)	
2002-04-29	Brian Miller (42)	White	California (Carson)	
2002-04-28	Jesus Robles (26)	Latino	California (Lynwood)	
2002-04-26	Terrance Heywood		U.S. Virgin Islands (St. Croix)	An officer responded after reports of a naked man at a beach. When the officer confronted the man, Heywood, he approached the officer, who fell over before shooting Heywood. Heywood was unarmed.
2002-04-16	Esau Marin (25)	Hispanic	Texas (Houston)	
2002-04-16	Eddie Dominguez (27)	Latino	California (Los Angeles)	
2002-04-14	Michael Wayne Goodman (40)	Unknown	Texas (Houston)	
2002-04-12	Kendraey McCall (19)	Black	California (Vermont Vista)	
2002-04-09	Dominick Galliano (51)	Unknown	New Jersey (Dover Township)	
2002-04-09	Gail Galliano (49)	Unknown	New Jersey (Dover Township)	
2002-04-09	Chris Galliano (25)	Unknown	New Jersey (Dover Township)	
2002-04-09	Gary Williams (48)	Unknown	New Jersey (Dover Township)	
2002-04-09	Time Williams (46)	Unknown	New Jersey (Dover Township)	
2002-04-04	Randy Reeves (19)	Latino	California (Ventura)	
2002-04-03	Trey Antuan Lively (30)	Black	Florida (Miami Gardens)	
2002-03-27	Nathan Ruch (20)		Illinois (Normal)	Shot and killed by Officer James Merica via shotgun. Merica exited his police vehicle with a shotgun as Ruch's pickup came around the house and "veered toward the officer", Merica fired four shots at the truck, which crossed the cul-de-sac and crashed into a garage. Ruch was unarmed
2002-03-23	Joshua Villanueva (26)	Latino	California (Highland Park)	
2002-03-22	Terry J. Compagno (47)	Unknown	Illinois (Wood River)	
2002-03-18	Jimmy Joe Urioste (44)	Unknown	Texas (Spade)	
2002-03-18	Terry L. Lappin (58)	Unknown	Florida (Largo)	
2002-03-18	Henry Wolk (77)		Illinois (Chicago)	Killed in a shootout with officer Donald J. Marquez, who also died.
2002-03-17	Milton Glenn Dunkley Jr. (26)	Unknown	Virginia (Richmond)	
2002-03-16	Nathaniel B. Adkins (22)	Black	Florida (Brooksville)	
2002-03-16	Richard Tims (35)	Black	California (San Francisco)	
2002-03-08	Victor "Twin" Meza Jr. (19)	Hispanic	Texas (Houston)	
2002-02-28	Gary S. Martin (39)	White	California (San Diego)	
2002-02-26	Paul Simmons (47)	Unknown	Iowa (Urbandale)	
2002-02-26	Henry C. Simmons (45)	Unknown	Iowa (Urbandale)	
2002-02-26	Andre J. Gilreath (31)	Unknown	Washington DC	
2002-02-25	Michael Buchanan (61)	Unknown	Maine (Sommerville)	
2002-02-24	Douglas Kim (47)	Asian	California (Rancho Park)	
2002-02-24	Steve Allred (42)	White	Florida (Groveland)	
2002-02-23	Tallas Tomeny (31)	White	North Carolina (Robbins)	
2002-02-22	Byron Hammick (26)	Black	Oregon (Portland)	Police were responding to a 911 call from a security guard that a man was assaulting a 3-year-old boy. The police were informed by the guard that the man could be armed with a handgun. When police arrived, they ordered Hammick to stop. The officers considered using their mace and batons to subdue Hammick, but decided that the motel room was small and that Hammick was too large. Police fired a shot through a broken window, wounding Hammick. Four shots in total were then fired, killing Hammick. He was found to be unarmed, but had PCP and Methamphetamine in his system. Before the incident, Hammick called 911 between 1:30 am and 2:00 am to report a noise complaint about a local dance club across the street from the motel. Later, Hammick called 911 at 3:05 am, threatening to kill the 3-year-old boy.
2002-02-19	David E. Kinney (35)	Unknown	Georgia (Ringgold)	
2002-02-18	Shawn J. Maxwell (31)	Black	Washington (Seattle)	
2002-02-18	Ramin Isayo (27)	Latino	California (Palmdale)	
2002-02-17	Phillip J. Lamberson (44)	Unknown	Maryland (Joppa)	
2002-02-15	Gonzalo F. Martinez (26)	Latino	California (Downey)	Two officers shot and killed unarmed Martinez when he reached toward his waistband after a high-speed chase.
2002-02-12	Leon C. Arther (31)	Unknown	New Mexico (Albuquerque)	Two APD officers shot Arthur to death when he allegedly make a "threatening approach," brandishing a hairbrush.
2002-02-12	Willie Murray (37)	Unknown	Massachusetts (Boston)	Murray was shot and killed by police after a 4 a.m. traffic stop, after he was observed driving the wrong way on a one-way street with his lights off. Reportedly Murray refused to pull over.
2002-02-09	Jack Alton Stuart (42)	White	Texas (Houston)	
2002-02-07	Robert Winters (30)	White	Illinois (Chicago)	An off-duty police officer shot Winters after Winters robbed him at gunpoint and fled.
2002-02-04	Kamekona Cummings (33)		Hawaii (Puna)	
2002-01-31	Guanda Denise Turner (41)	Black	California (Long Beach)	Turner died a week later after officers put her in a chokehold.
2002-01-29	David Montanez (36)	Latino	California (Pico Rivera)	
2002-01-29	Robert Contreras (21)	Latino	California (Mission Hills)	
2002-01-26	Craig Bickerstaff (27)	Unknown	Ohio (Cleveland)	
2002-01-24	Kerby Charles		U.S. Virgin Islands (St. Croix)	An officer found Charles trespassing on his property after hearing his dog bark. After pursuing Charles, he and the officer fought over a gun, and it discharged, killing Charles. The officer faced administrative charges, as the attorney general stated the officer should have called for backup and should not have approached Charles close enough to let him lunge for his weapon.
2002-01-23	John Wegrich (53)	Unknown	Florida (Lake Worth)	
2002-01-23	David Kasmar (46)	Unknown	Illinois (Naperville)	
2002-01-23	Shaminder Singh Mundi (20)	White	California (Encino)	
2002-01-21	Eddie L. Macklin (20)	Black	Florida (Miami)	
2002-01-20	Luis A. Torres (45)	Hispanic	Texas (Baytown)	
2002-01-19	Marcella Byrd (57)	Black	California (Long Beach)	
2002-01-18	Russell L. Stewart (31)	Unknown	Utah (Bountiful)	Stewart was unarmed when police shot him during a foot chase. His family files a suit against the police, claiming excessive force, wrongful death, and a coverup.
2002-01-18	Karim Contreras Diaz (25)	Unknown	Utah (Orem)	
2002-01-15	Jermaine Sanders (25)	Black	Ohio (Cleveland)	
2002-01-06	Cathalene Pacheco (42)		Hawaii (Waikoloa, South Kohala)	
2002-01-01	Leonardo Garcia (19)	Latino	California (Lynwood)	
2002-01-01	Fred Douglas Wallace (73)		Texas (Tyler)	
2002-?-?	Samuel Rodriguez		Wisconsin (Milwaukee)	

== See also ==
- Death in custody § United States
- Henry A. Wallace Police Crime Public Database
- List of cases of police brutality
- List of countries with annual rates and counts for killings by law enforcement officers
- List of law enforcement officers killed in the line of duty in the United States
- List of law enforcement officers convicted for an on-duty killing in the United States
- List of shootings by US immigration agents
- List of police reforms related to the George Floyd protests
- List of unarmed African Americans killed by law enforcement officers in the United States
- Lists of killings by law enforcement officers
- Police brutality in the United States
- Police misconduct § United States
- Police riot § United States
- Police use of deadly force in the United States
