= Shaver Lake (disambiguation) =

Shaver Lake may refer to:

- Shaver Lake, reservoir
- Shaver Lake (Arkansas), a lake in Cross County, Arkansas
- Shaver Lake, California
