= Crookedest railroad =

Crookedest railroad may refer to:

- Mount Tamalpais and Muir Woods Railway
- San Joaquin and Eastern Railroad
