= El Prado, California =

El Prado
- Former settlement
- Location in California
- Coordinates: 36°54′23″N 119°43′54″W
- Country: United States
- State: California
- County: Fresno
- Elevation: 377 ft (115 m)

El Prado is a former settlement in Fresno County, California, United States. It was located at the junction of the San Joaquin and Eastern and the Southern Pacific Railroads, 6 miles (9.7 km) north-northwest of Clovis.

The settlement was located at an elevation of 377 feet (115 m). The primary function of the settlement was serving as a switch yard for the Southern Pacific Railroad, and the San Joaquin and Eastern Railroad. It initially known as "Nopac Siding", before it was changed to El Prado (The Meadow) shortly after its construction. It still appeared on maps as late as 1922.

== History ==
A clash between Southern Pacific Railroad Police, and the Industrial Workers of the World took place in January 1913, when the railroad police assaulted the members of the I.W.W. for passing literature to train passengers, and laborers passing through El Prado.
