= George Ballis =

American photographer (1925–2010)

George “Elfie” Ballis
- Born: August 12, 1925; Faribault, Minnesota, U.S.
- Died: September 24, 2010 (aged 85); Fresno, California, U.S.
- Education: University of Minnesota (B.A. Journalism & Political Science)
- Alma mater: University of Minnesota
- Occupation: Photographer · Activist
- Years active: 1950s–2010
- Known for: Documenting migrant‑farmworker and Cesar Chavez/UFW movement
- Notable work: Over 30,000 photographs; numerous documentary films (e.g. *I Am Joaquin*, *The Dispossessed*, *The Richest Land*)
- Spouse: Maia Sorter (second wife)
- Children: 2

George "Elfie" Ballis (August 12, 1925 – September 24, 2010) was an American photographer and activist who advocated on behalf of migrant farm workers in California, and took tens of thousands of photographs documenting the efforts of César Chávez, the Mexican American labor leader who founded the United Farm Workers.

== Early life and education ==
Ballis was born on August 12, 1925, the son of Greek and German immigrants, and was raised in Faribault, Minnesota. He enlisted in the United States Marine Corps during World War II and served in the South Pacific as a mechanic repairing torpedo bombers. After completing his military service, he earned an undergraduate degree from the University of Minnesota in 1950 and became involved in radical politics, joining the Student World Federalists. Ballis originally majored in electrical engineering, but despite his strong abilities in math and science he changed direction and eventually graduated with a double major in journalism and political science.

== Career ==
One of his first jobs was at U.S. Rubber, where a manager told him that he "had to have a U.S. Rubber attitude... ready to go anywhere at anytime" but found that he "didn't have the U.S. Rubber attitude." After his car broke down while he was on vacation in San Francisco, Ballis decided to live there and took a job writing headlines for article in The Wall Street Journal, where he was called in by his boss about his use of creative phrasing.

Moving to Fresno in 1953, Ballis became editor of the Valley Labor Citizen, a labor newspaper, a position he held until 1966. During this time Ballis took a photography course taught by Dorothea Lange, a photographer and photojournalist who had documented the Great Depression in her photos. He started taking pictures on his own, photographing migrant workers and showing the substandard housing and working conditions that they endured, saying "I wanted my photographs to reflect to them the power and dignity they had". Ballis made an effort to familiarize himself with his subjects before taking their pictures, a process by which he was able to take pictures having gained the respect of this he was photographing. Thousands of Ballis's photos captured the efforts of Cesar Chavez to organize Latino workers, leading to the formation of the United Farm Workers. Works by Ballis depicting protests and marches appeared in such publications as Life, Newsweek, Time, The New York Times and The Washington Post. Labor historian Richard Steven Street called Ballis's work "activist photography with a point of view" and credited him as being one of a small number of freelance photographers who brought Chávez the public attention he needed to succeed in his efforts.

Ballis founded the National Land for People (NLP) in 1964, though it was not incorporated as a non-profit until 1974. The organization supported enforcement of the 160-acre ownership limit in the Reclamation Act of 1902, arguing that federally financed irrigation projects should benefit small farmers rather than large landowners. NLP also supported land ownership for farm workers and pursued legal and educational efforts related to land and water issues in California's Central Valley.

As director of National Land for People, Ballis opposed a June 1980 decision by the United States Supreme Court that ruled that a 1902 law limiting irrigated farms to 160 acres (65 ha) did not apply in the Imperial Valley. Ballis called the decision "Morally, legally, socially, politically and economically, a bankrupt decision", saying that there were a disproportionate number of large corporate and foreign-owned farms that benefited from federal subsidies for irrigation, and Ballis expressed concern that the ruling could lead to the repeal of such limits in other agricultural areas of California. While directing the National Land for People, Ballis made a 23-minute film titled The Richest Land that juxtaposed small farmers and corporate farmers, and Jessie Lopez De La Cruz and Dolores Huerta both made cameos.

In 1969, Ballis worked as the cinematographer on the Luis Valdez short film I Am Joaquin. Ballis produced several other films, including The Oakland Five, which examines the discriminatory treatment of Black youth by the Oakland school board, and Toughest Game in Town, which portrays the struggle of low-income communities in Santa Fe as they work to overcome poverty.

In 1971 Ballis produced The Dispossessed, a documentary film which examined the Pit River Tribe’s struggle to reclaim their ancestral lands in Shasta County, California from corporate and governmental control. The documentary includes footage of a nighttime occupation by Pit River activists on land held by Pacific Gas and Electric and discusses the tribe's land claims and disputes with government agencies and corporations. The Dispossessed won the Grand Award at the Foothill Film Festival.

== Personal life ==
Ballis was married twice, and had two children. His second wife was Maia Sorter, who he married in the early 1970s.

== Death ==
A resident of Tollhouse, California, Ballis died at age 85 on September 24, 2010, at the Veterans Affairs Medical Center in Fresno, California, where he had been treated for prostate cancer.

== Legacy ==
Ballis' photographic archives are held at the University of California, Merced Library.
