= Theresa Kibby =

American boxer (1953–2021)

Theresa Maxine Kibby (née Buckskin; August 12, 1953, in Tollhouse, California – September 4, 2021) was an American former professional female boxer. With a record of ten wins, three losses and four draws, with three of her wins by knockout, Kibby, along with her sister Darlene Buckskin, was part of the first pair of Native American women, and first sisters, in California to receive professional boxing licenses. Kibby and Darlene Buckskin were professional boxers from 1970 to 1977.

Kibby was inducted into the International Boxing Hall of Fame in the Women's Trailblazer category as part of the class of 2024.

== Personal ==
She was the daughter of Dave Kibby, Sr.. She started boxing at age 10.
