= California Health Sciences University =

University in Clovis, California, U.S.

- Other name: CHSU
- Motto: Cogito Cognosco Curo (Latin)
- Motto in English: Imagine, Learn, Heal
- Type: Private, for-profit
- Established: 2012
- President: Florence Dunn
- Dean: John Graneto, DO; Mark Okamoto, PharmD
- Location: Clovis, California, United States; 36.8289°N 119.7007°W
- Website: chsu.edu

California Health Sciences University (CHSU) is a private, for-profit university located in Clovis, in the U.S. state of California. Founded in 2012, the school operates two academic programs, which offer doctoral degrees in pharmacy and osteopathic medicine. Graduates of the College of Osteopathic Medicine will receive the Doctor of Osteopathic Medicine degree. The College of Osteopathic Medicine is fully pre-accredited by the American Osteopathic Association's (AOA) Commission on Osteopathic College Accreditation (COCA).

== History ==
The university was founded in 2012 by the Assemi family. The College of Pharmacy opened in 2014. In 2018, the College of Osteopathic Medicine opened. The Fresno area was the largest city in the United States without a medical school until the opening of the College of Osteopathic Medicine. Construction for the osteopathic medical school broke ground in 2018. The university generated controversy regarding its for-profit status and high tuition costs.

== Academics ==
The university offers two degree programs, a Doctor of Pharmacy (PharmD) and a Doctor of Osteopathic Medicine (DO). In December 2018, the College of Osteopathic Medicine received approval to recruit and begin receiving applications by May 2019. The first class of osteopathic medical students will begin courses in the fall of 2020. The American Osteopathic Association currently lists the college as having pre-accreditation status.

The 4-year pharmacy program preaccreditation status with the Accreditation Council for Pharmacy Education (ACPE) was withdrawn in 2020 for failure to meet 3 of 25 accreditation standards. CHSU restarted the ACPE accreditation application process for a new, 3-year Doctor of Pharmacy program in 2021, but precandidate status for the new program was denied in 2022 with the option to appeal. CHSU chose not to pursue an appeal.

The university itself is accredited by the Western Association of Schools and Colleges (WASC) Senior College and University Commission.

== Campus ==
The university is located on a 60-acre (24 ha) campus in Clovis, California. The pharmacy school is housed in a 30,000 square foot building at 120 N. Clovis Avenue. The medical school building is over 90,000 sq. feet at 2500 Alluvial Ave.

== See also ==
- List of medical schools in the United States
