= Tollhouse, California =

Unincorporated community in California, United States

Tollhouse
- Unincorporated community
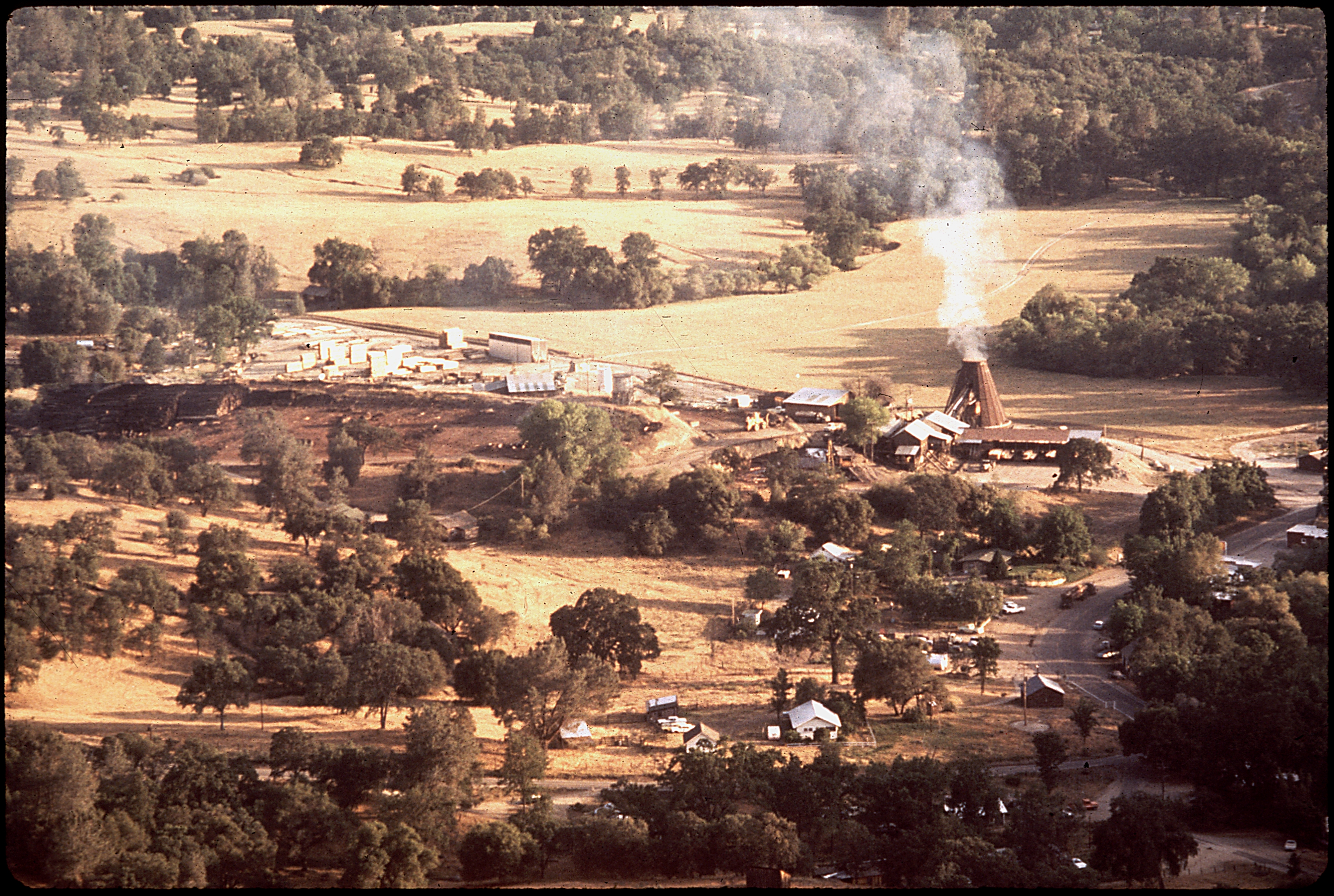
- Tollhouse in 1972

- Location in California Tollhouse (the United States)
- Coordinates: 37°01′08″N 119°23′57″W
- Country: United States
- State: California
- County: Fresno
- Elevation: 1,919 ft (585 m)

Tollhouse (formerly, Toll House) is an unincorporated community in Fresno County, California, United States. It lies at an elevation of 1,919 feet (585 m). Tollhouse is located in the Sierra Nevada, 7 miles (11 km) southwest of Shaver Lake and 18 miles southwest of Huntington Lake. It is home to 2,089 people.

The town was created in the 1860s around the Yancy lumber mill. The name "tollhouse" comes from the fact that the community was also built up in connection to a now-defunct toll road running up the steep slopes of Sarver Peak to Pineridge and housed a toll house.

The ZIP Code is 93667, and the community is served by area code 559.

The first post office opened in Tollhouse in 1876, closed in 1884 and re-opened in 1885. The last toll on the toll road was collected in 1878.

Nearby small towns include Auberry, Prather, and Shaver.

Tollhouse is the tribal headquarters for the Cold Springs Rancheria of Mono Indians of California.

== Notable people ==
Notable current and former residents of Tollhouse include:

- George Ballis (1925-2010), photographer and activist whose photos documented the efforts of César Chávez and the formation of the United Farm Workers.
- Theresa Kibby (1953-2021) professional boxer, member of the International Boxing Hall of Fame

== See also ==
- Burrough Valley
