= A Will of Their Own =

- Based on: Daughters of the New World by Susan Shreve
- Written by: Susan Nanus; Lynn Roth
- Directed by: Karen Arthur
- Starring: Lea Thompson; Ellen Burstyn; Faye Dunaway; Thomas Gibson
- Theme music composer: David Michael Frank
- Country of origin: United States
- Original language: English
- No. of episodes: 2

Production
- Producers: Elliot Friedgen; Susan Nanus
- Cinematography: Tom Neuwirth
- Editor: Tina Hirsch
- Running time: 225 minutes
- Production companies: The Wolper Organization; Lakeside Productions; Warner Bros. Television

Original release
- Network: NBC
- Release: October 18 – October 19, 1998

A Will of Their Own is a 1998 American television miniseries directed by Karen Arthur. It was adapted from the novel Daughters of the New World by Susan Shreve. The film follows six generations of females within one family, and their struggle for power and independence in America. The film debuted on October 18, 1998, on the NBC network to mixed critical reviews. It was released to DVD late 2003.

== Plot ==
The film begins in 1894 and ends in 1985.

Annie Jermaine (Reiko Aylesworth) immigrates from Europe to America where she becomes a housemaid for a wealthy doctor. She breaks class restrictions when she marries the doctor's son and begins training as a nurse. However, she is unable to utilize her knowledge due to the popular belief that women were not capable of practicing medicine.

Amanda Steward (Lea Thompson) is a young woman who aspires to become a photographer but is turned down because she is a woman. She goes through life in trying to help women and make them stronger.

Sarah (Paris Jefferson) faces difficulties being the wife of a powerful U.S. senator.

Susan (Charlotte Ross) is a hippie who becomes a doctor and later opens up a health clinic for battered women.

Jessie (Sônia Braga) is a farm worker who walked the fields of the San Joaquin Valley for nearly half a century. She is the first female organizer for the United Farm Workers. Seeing those around her struggle and sometimes die because of poor living and working conditions, she wanted to help and joined César Chávez to make a change.

== Cast ==
- Lea Thompson as Amanda Steward
- Ellen Burstyn as Veronica Steward
- Faye Dunaway as Margaret Sanger
- Thomas Gibson as James MacClaren
- Sônia Braga as Jessie Lopez De La Cruz
- Reiko Aylesworth as Annie Jermaine
- Tovah Feldshuh as Mrs. Rubenstein
- Paris Jefferson as Sarah
- Charlotte Ross as Susan
- Eric McCormack as Pierce Peterson
- Diana Scarwid as Crystal Eastman
- John Shea as Dr. Jonathan Abbott

== Awards and nominations ==
Motion Picture Sound Editors

- Nominated, "Best Sound Editing - Television Mini-Series - Dialogue & ADR unknown"
- Nominated, "Best Sound Editing - Television Mini-Series - Music unknown"
