= Zubin Damania =

American physician, businessman & comedian

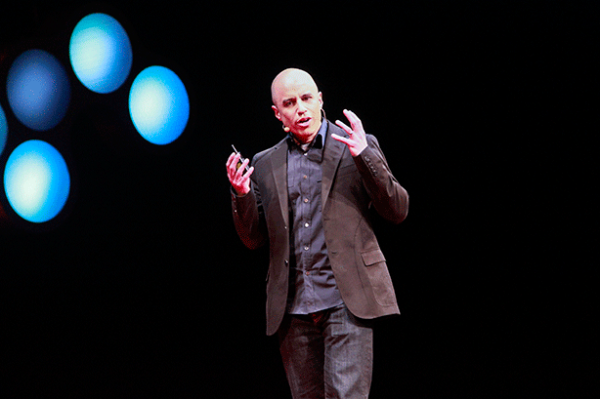
- Damania speaking at TEDMED 2013
- Born: April 23, 1973 (age 53); New Jersey, U.S.
- Education: Clovis West High School; UC Berkeley (B.A.); UCSF Med (M.D.); Stanford Med (Residency)
- Occupations: Internist, Internet celebrity ZDoggMD

YouTube information
- Channel: ZDoggMD
- Years active: 2010–present
- Genres: Medical education; comedy; music
- Subscribers: 481 thousand
- Views: 92.5 million
- Last updated: June 21, 2026
- Website: zdoggmd.com

Zubin Damania (born April 23, 1973) is an American physician, assistant professor, comedian, internet personality, and musician. He also has been writing and performing comedic raps as ZDoggMD, an internet celebrity known for his music videos, parodies, and comedy sketches about medical issues, as well as systemic issues with healthcare.

Damania was a practicing hospitalist (physician specializing in acutely ill patients admitted to the hospital) at Stanford University School of Medicine for 10 years. He was then the founder of Turntable Health, a direct primary care clinic in Downtown Las Vegas that was funded by Zappos CEO Tony Hsieh.

== Early life and education ==
Damania was born on April 23, 1973, in New Jersey to Indian Parsi parents, and grew up in Clovis, California, to which his family moved when he was eight years old. His parents were from Pune, Maharashtra and doctors by profession. His father was a private practice primary care doctor and his mother was a psychiatrist. Damania has two younger siblings. He quipped: "I am the oldest of three children in the family, but sometimes my parents consider me the only child because the other two are not doctors."

He attended Clovis West High School, graduating in 1991. He then went on to receive an undergraduate degree at University of California, Berkeley, where he minored in music and majored in molecular biology and cell biology. While there he completed a research thesis in a genetics lab on integrin-mediated cell-cell adhesion pathways in the Drosophila melanogaster model with James Fristrom.

Damania attended medical school at UCSF School of Medicine, and graduated in 1999. His time in school was marked by a series of pursuits that combined comedy and medicine: he streamed medical comedy routines for a startup called Medschool.com, and performed medical based standup routines for drug companies, hospitals, and other medical organizations. He also gave the commencement speech at UCSF at his graduation, which has had tens of thousands of views on YouTube and made NPR's list of top commencement speeches of all time. In the speech, Damania instructed newly minted physicians to "wear shoe covers" because the hospital is "a dangerous place for expensive shoes", riffing on the "Wear sunscreen" speech.

== Career ==
He completed his internal medicine residency at Stanford University School of Medicine, from 1999 to 2002. Damania then stayed on at the Palo Alto Medical Foundation for ten years as a hospitalist from 2003 to 2012, spending 70% of his time at Stanford University Hospital (where he was an Adjunct Clinical Assistant Professor of Medicine) and 30% of his time at Washington Hospital in Fremont, California, and receiving the Russell Lee Award for Clinical Teaching. He simultaneously maintained a side hobby performing stand-up comedy for medical audiences worldwide.

Disheartened by the traditional fee-for-service model on which the American medical system is based, Damania became increasingly frustrated with his work. With the encouragement of Tony Hsieh, the CEO of Zappos.com, Damania began writing, performing, and filming musical parodies about the frustrations of work as a doctor, posting them on YouTube to immediate success. He developed a persona called ZDoggMD, fashioned as a gangsta rapper who was upset about popular misconceptions of healthcare in the US.

Damania gave a presentation called "Are Zombie Doctors Taking Over America?" at TEDMED 2013. In it he outlines the lingering problems of the US healthcare system, and how he has re-conceived it at Turntable Health into a patient-centered organization dedicated to preventative care. His speech was called one of the best of the conference. U.S. News & World Report called his critique of American healthcare "scalpel-sharp" and "at once discomfiting and comic".

Since beginning work on the clinic, Damania has been named one of the "top 14 people to watch in 2014" by Las Vegas Weekly, and has been profiled in The Atlantic Monthly, Xconomy, Wired, Venture Beat, Gizmodo, MSNBC, and USA Today. Turntable Health was also named "by far the most exciting healthcare startup" and "revolutionary" by The Next Web.

== ZDoggMD ==
ZDoggMD (character)
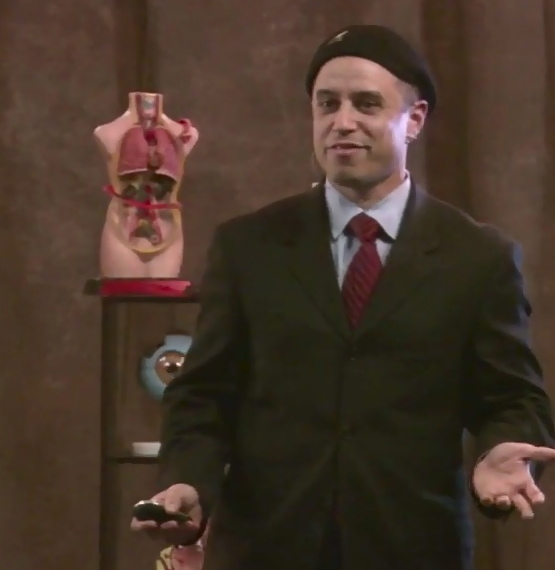
- Known for: Viral videos
- Website: zdoggmd.com

ZDoggMD is an alias of Damania since 2011, and under the name he makes music videos, health-care theme parodies, and comedy sketches about contemporary medical issues and working in the medical field. When his first music video (Immunize, based on Billionaire by Travie McCoy and Bruno Mars) was viewed 200,000 times, it got Damania death threats from anti-vaccination activists, who also mounted an unsuccessful campaign to get him fired. Damania spent time reading anti-vaccination groups online and the few medical experts who were attempting to push against the tide of disinformation, such as David Gorski. He decided he could present information in a unique style, with emotion and energy. In 2020, he has produced hundreds of videos, for a total YouTube viewership with 481K subscribers, in addition to Facebook and Instagram. He still gets death threats.

=== Current endeavors ===
ZdoggMD has been featured or interviewed in several medical-based, and other well-known publications, including The Atlantic Monthly, TechCrunch, Radio Rounds, The Guardian, Mental floss, ReachMD, ScienceBlogs, ACP Hospitalist, and Today's Hospitalist, among others.

His website won the 2010 Best New Medical Weblog at the 2010 Medical Weblog Awards sponsored by Epocrates and Lenovo. His videos feature a rotating cast of several characters, also practicing doctors, including, most often, Dr. Harry, a pediatrician, and Doc Quixote, Dr. Diego, and others. He often collaborates musically with Southern California DJ and producer samix, who produced the album Midriff Music by Josh Martinez which won the category "Best Rap Recording" award at the 2005 Western Canadian Music Awards. He is also currently collaborating with Devin Moore, a composer, bassist in the band “Rabbit!,” and member of Downtown Project's music development team in Las Vegas.

ZdoggMD's work has been called "entertainment that might save your life", he has been labeled "the jolliest doctor on the West Coast", and "a genuine doctor who uses YouTube as a creativity outlet to teach people about things like safe sex, delivering bad news, stayin' healthy on vacation, and hemorrhoids." His videos cover topics such as ulcers, testicular exams, Caribbean medical schools, stool transplants, overworked doctors, the role of hospitalists in medicine versus other specialists, vaccine controversies, healthcare in the US, CPR, television doctors, and being on call during the holidays.

== Turntable Health ==
In 2012, Tony Hsieh invited Damania to visit Las Vegas, where Hsieh was in the process of investing $350 million of his own money in a project he hoped would revitalize Downtown Las Vegas (The Downtown Project). He convinced Damania to quit his job as Physician at Stanford and moved his family to Nevada. Hsieh tasked Damania with "fixing Healthcare in Vegas". Once in Las Vegas, Damania continued to produce videos, both as ZDoggMD and himself, while working on opening Turntable Health.

While conceiving of the idea for Turntable Health, Damania met Rushika Fernandopulle, co-founder and CEO of a Boston-based startup called Iora Health, who had become known for his vision of rebuilding healthcare by removing fee-for-service episodic payments from primary care, focusing on prevention, and using a membership model. The two forged a partnership.

Turntable Health, a direct primary care clinic in Downtown Las Vegas, was the result of their collaboration. It was based on a patient-focused, preventative model that subscribers could either pay a monthly fee or pay out of pocket depending on individual coverage. The clinic opened in December 2013 and was an integral part of Hsieh's Downtown Project of revitalizing Las Vegas and re-visualizing urban spaces. Turntable Health shut down as of January 31, 2017.

== UNLV School of Medicine ==
Damania is currently an Adjunct Assistant Professor of Medicine at UNLV School of Medicine and has been affiliated with them since February 2017.

== Personal life ==
Damania is married to Margaret Lin, a radiologist. They have two daughters.
