= Burrough Valley =

Valley in Fresno County, California, United States

Coordinates: 36.97523°N 119.36707°W

Burrough Valley, California (once also called Burr Valley) is located in the Sierra Nevada foothills of eastern Fresno County, approximately thirty miles northeast of Fresno, California, at an elevation of about 1,600 feet (490 m) above sea level. The small valley covers approximately 4,000 acres (16 km^{2}).

== Natural history ==
Burrough Valley’s geology includes both igneous and sedimentary formations and a great deal of metamorphosis resulting from a history of frequent seismic activity. The area includes fragments of an ancient island arc scraped off of a subducting plate in the Mesozoic and later affected by the much more recent tilting up of the Sierra Nevada batholith and igneous intrusions. It also contains ancient sea floor and mantle hundreds of millions of years old. These are almost always metamorphosed due to the complicated and dynamic tectonic and volcanic activity. Rocks include light colored leucogranites as well as darker gabbro and peridotite. Quartzite and feldspar are also found, mostly remobilized from hydrologic activity. California's state rock, serpentine, metamorphosed mantle, is common; but not as much as in the Gold Country north of the San Joaquin River. Serpentine is the gold bearing rock of the Gold Country, and some gold was mined in the Burrough Valley area, especially Watts Valley and Copper King Mountain. But these were not rich strikes.

The climate is relatively dry with an average annual rainfall of about 20-25 inches but varying greatly within a range of less than 10 inches (250 mm) to more than 40 inches (1,000 mm). The area is central oak woodland, grassland and chaparral. The valley's trees include the valley oak, the blue oak, and the interior live oak. Along the intermittent streams are found willows, cottonwoods, and white-barked sycamores. South facing hillsides are relatively barren, with scattered patches of buck brush (ceanothus) and scrubby blue oaks and live oaks. North facing hillsides are often covered with thick manzanita, poison oak, live oak, California buckeye (aesculus californica) and buck brush. In the spring, especially after wet winters, wildflowers proliferate, including the California poppy, the Mariposa lily, many forms of lupin and brodiaea.

Burrough Valley is habitat to many animals and birds, including black-tailed deer, mountain lion, bobcat, coyote, cottontail, gray squirrel, California ground squirrel, and many smaller rodents. Wild pigs were introduced or migrated to the area in the 1980s. Feral pigs, which escaped from early settlers, were once common in the 1900s and early 20th century. Reptiles inhabiting the area include the northern Pacific rattlesnake, gopher snake, two species of king snake, garter snake, northern alligator lizard, western fence lizard, skink, and whiptail lizard. The area’s amphibians include the tree frog, California newt, several species of salamander, toad, and American bull frog, which was introduced in the 19th century. The foothill yellow-legged frog once was common, but is now rare. Golden eagles occasionally soar high above the valley and make their nests in the remote rocky crags on the mountain tops. Red-tailed hawks often ride afternoon thermals. There are also Cooper’s hawks, sharp-shinned hawks, merlins and kestrels. Turkey vultures spend most of the year in the area but migrate south in winter. Crows are common. Other birds include meadow larks, mourning doves, starlings, scrub jays, Steller’s jays, blackbirds, sparrows, towhees, western bluebirds, Wilson’s warblers, western flycatchers, titmice, humming birds, and many other small birds. Wild turkeys, introduced in the 1960s, are common. Band-tailed pigeons enter the valley in the fall and winter to feast on acorns. The commonest bird is perhaps the acorn woodpecker, whose raucous laugh can be heard nearly every daytime moment. Several other species of woodpeckers are found, including the red-shafted flicker, Lewis's woodpecker and downy woodpecker. California valley quail are also common, with their call “chi-ca-GO! chi-chi-ca-GO!” heard frequently.

== Human prehistory and history ==
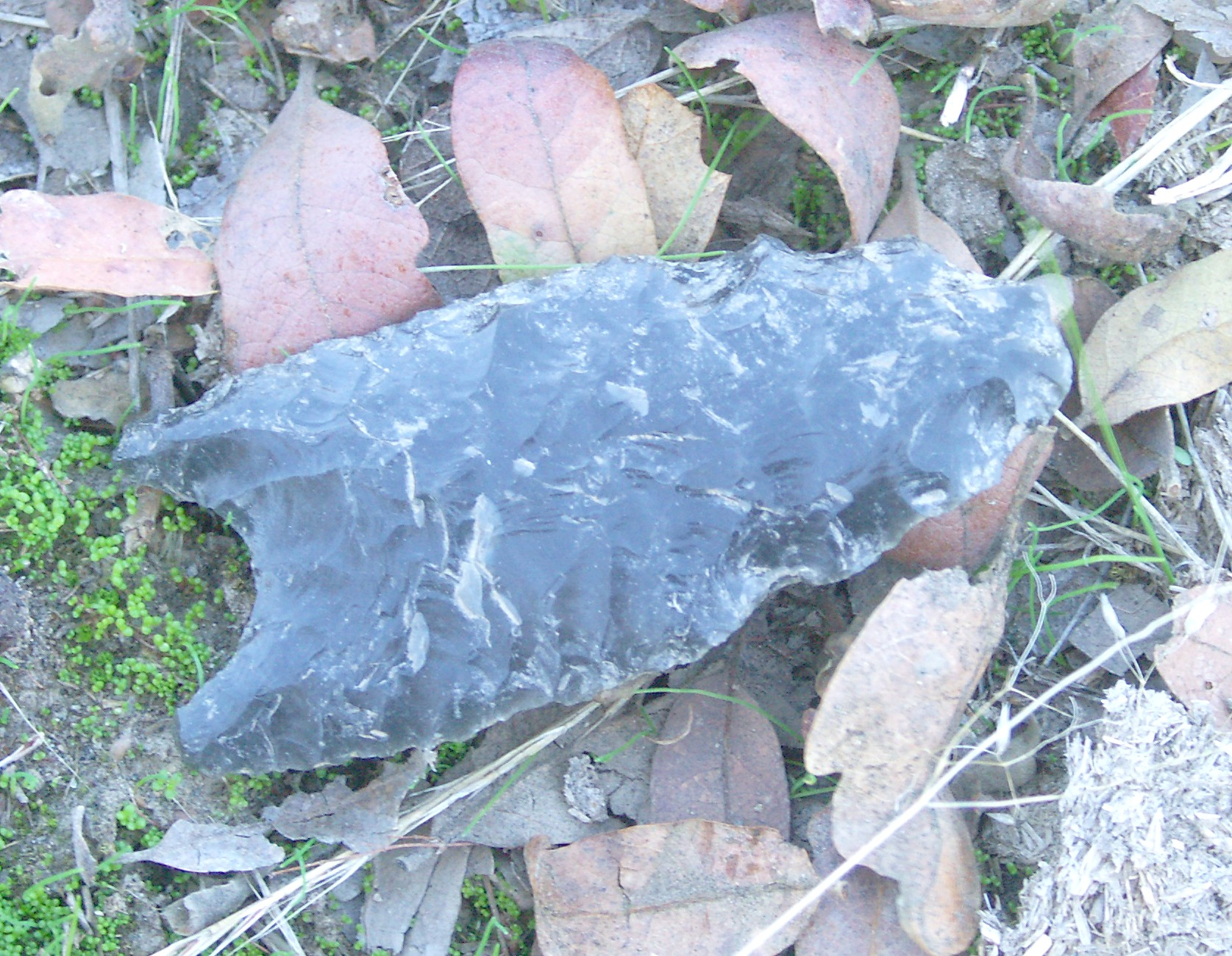
Clovis point used by paleo-Indians

Human habitation of the Burrough Valley area goes back perhaps fifteen thousand years when tribes of paleo-Indians hunted megafauna like the giant short-faced bear (Arctodus simus) in the area and left their distinctive fluted spear-points, called Clovis points. More recently the Yokuts (more specifically the Casson or Gashowu tribes of Yokuts) and Western Mono tribes of Native Americans lived here. Local Monos still live on the Cold Springs Rancheria in neighboring Sycamore Valley. Others live off the reservation in Burrough Valley itself. During the period of white settlement, many white men took Native American women as wives, and many people of mixed blood now live in Burrough Valley and surrounding areas. The Mono began to inhabit the area perhaps five hundred years ago, when their Piute ancestors first began to cross through the passes in the Sierra Nevada to trade with the Yokuts, who lived in the San Joaquin Valley and the western slope of the Sierra Nevada. Among the staple foodstuffs of the Native Americans was the acorn. Bedrock mortars once used for grinding acorns can be observed in exposed rock slabs.

The first nonnatives arrived and settled in the area in the 1850s during the California Gold Rush. Among the first were Colonel Henry Burrough, after whom the valley is named, and Henry Rivercombe. According to local legend, Rivercombe named all his farm animals Jefferson Davis just before he left to join the Confederates and fight in the Civil War. Burrough and Rivercombe came to Burrough Valley from Millerton, California, a rough gold-mining town on the San Joaquin River and the first seat of Fresno County. They may have moved to Burrough Valley prospecting for gold since some gold was found in the area. A few flecks can still be found in local streams. A considerable mining camp of about 2,000, known as Sycamore Diggins, sprang up on Sycamore Creek in Watts Valley, a few miles south in the early 1860s.

In any case, the footloose Burrough and Rivercombe were gone by 1870. Not much is known about Burrough Valley during the 1870s, but its story is surely linked to the history of nearby Tollhouse, California, which sprang up in the late 1860s in connection with a toll road built up the steep slopes of Sarver Peak to Pine Ridge.

The 1870s began a transition from mining to timber cutting. It is a somewhat complicated story which owes a great deal to the financial vision of Leland Stanford and the Central Pacific, Southern Pacific, and Santa Fe Railroads. When Stanford located a station at Fresno in 1872 because of the great agricultural potential of the area, he changed the history of the Sierra Nevada and of Tollhouse and Burrough Valley.

Fresno began to grow very rapidly, and the wood to build it came from Pine Ridge. Until 1894, when the Fresno Flume was completed, all the lumber from the saw mills on Pine Ridge came through Tollhouse. Since Pine Ridge was snowed in during the winter, mill workers often acquired property in the foothills, and many lived in Burrough Valley when not working on Pine Ridge.

Many settlers also came to Burrough Valley because of the Seventh-day Adventist church. During the 1870s SDA visionary Ellen G. White advised adherents to leave cities and move to rural areas to prepare for the second-coming, or advent, of Jesus Christ. Many Adventists came to Burrough Valley. Indeed, White herself bought property in the valley in 1888 so that her consumptive daughter could live there. White lived in Burrough Valley for a short time and, after seeing it for the first time on July 3, 1888, said the following : "We found Burrough Valley to be a delightful place, with a good climate. The scenery is beautiful and the valley is encompassed with hills, as was Jerusalem with mountains."

In the early period, when every hamlet boasted a general store and post office, Burrough Valley had two general store-post office combinations, with the post mark “Burrough, CA.” The first of these was owned by Chester C. Burnett. The Burnett store-post office was in business perhaps as early as the 1870s. The Burnetts went out of business in the 1890s, and Harry E. Spence and his wife Lutie set up a store-post office in 1899. The Spence store went out of business in the early teens, and the post office continued until 1917. With the coming of automobiles, postal carriers could travel longer distances and residents could travel farther to buy groceries and supplies.

During the 2000s, many began to leave Burrough Valley to participate in the agricultural boom in the San Joaquin Valley around Fresno; and the area began another transition to cattle ranching. Cattle ranching was the mainstay of the local economy until the 1970s, when increasing costs coupled with low prices for beef made continuing cattle operations untenable for the ranchers, including the descendants of the early families, who began to sell off their holdings to developers.

Burrough Valley has now become a retirement community and a bedroom community for workers with jobs in Fresno or other cities in the San Joaquin Valley. The population is now about 1,000.

== See also ==
- Tollhouse, California
- Shaver Lake
- Pineridge, California
- Fresno County, California
