= Shaver Lake Railroad =

Overview
- Locale: Shaver, California (today known as Shaver Lake)
- Dates of operation: 1907–1927

Technical
- Track gauge: 4 ft 8 1/2 in (1,435 mm) standard gauge

The Shaver Lake Railroad was a standard gauge logging railroad that operated in the Sierra Nevada of Fresno County, California. The line was abandoned in 1927.

== History ==
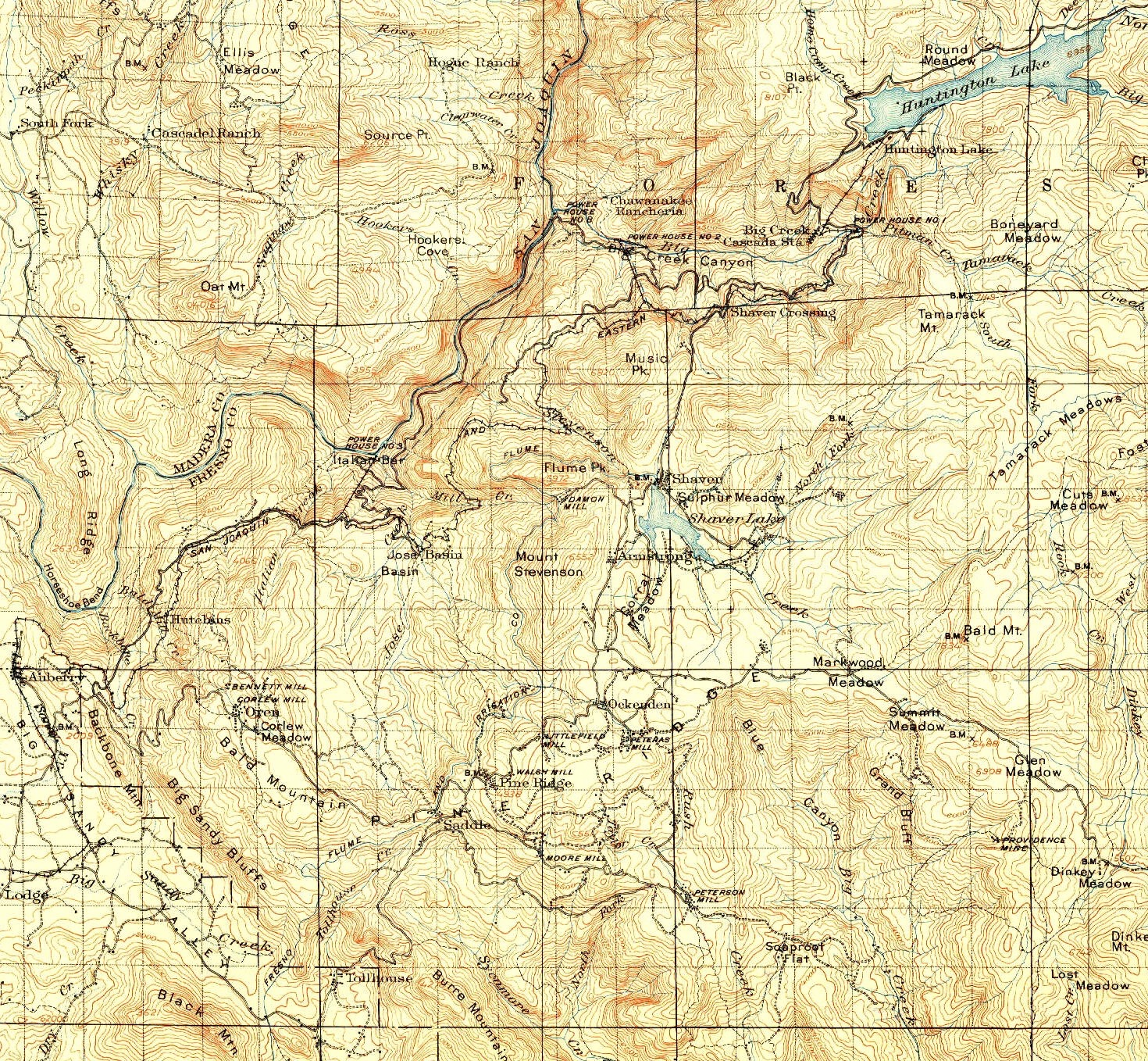
SJ&E RR line with Shaver Lake line before connection

The Shaver Lake Railroad traces its beginnings to October 31, 1891, when the Fresno Flume and Irrigation Company was incorporated to build 12 miles (19 km) of track from the lumber mill at Shaver to the forest timber.

In 1907, Southern California Edison bought the holdings of the Fresno Flume & Irrigation Co. and named the railroad the Shaver Lake Railroad. Trackage was extended 6 miles (10 km) from a connection with the San Joaquin and Eastern Railroad at Dawn to Shaver. On September 8, 1908, SCE reincorporated the holdings under the name of Fresno Flume and Lumber Company (also known as the Fresno Lumber and Irrigation Company).

In 1919 the Shaver Lake Railroad was sold to Shaver Lake Lumber Company and the track was extended six miles south of Shaver into the forest. The railroad was abandoned in 1927.

== See also ==
- List of defunct California railroads
