= Pineridge, California =

Unincorporated community in California, United States

Pineridge
- Unincorporated community
- Location in California Pineridge (the United States)
- Coordinates: 37°03′48″N 119°21′39″W
- Country: United States
- State: California
- County: Fresno
- Elevation: 4,843 ft (1,476 m)

Pineridge (formerly Kenyon and Pine Ridge) is an unincorporated community in Fresno County, California, United States. It is located 4 miles (6.4 km) southwest of Shaver Lake Heights, at an elevation of 4842 feet (1476 m).

The Kenyon post office opened in 1890, the name was changed to Pine Ridge in 1892, to Pineridge in 1895, and the office was closed in 1944. The name Kenyon is in honor of Silas W. Kenyon, its first postmaster.

The community is home to Cressmans General Store (which was burned down in the 2020 Creek fire but has now reopened) and Pine Ridge Elementary School. It has its own volunteer fire department.

The population of the area is approximately 300 people.

== See also ==
- Burrough Valley
- Tollhouse, California
- Clovis, California
