= Clovis West High School =

Public high school in California, United States

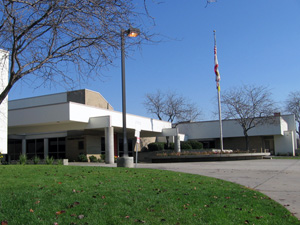

Location
- 1070 East Teague Avenue; Fresno, California 93720; United States; 36.8608°N 119.7643°W

Information
- Type: Public
- Established: 1976
- Principal: Jason James
- Teaching staff: 103.25 (FTE)
- Enrollment: 2,089 (2023–2024)
- Student to teacher ratio: 20.94
- Colors: Cardinal, gold, and white
- Athletics conference: TRAC conference
- Mascot: The Golden Eagles
- Rival: Clovis High School
- Newspaper: The Vantage
- Yearbook: The Olympia
- Feeder schools: Kastner Intermediate
- Website: cwhs.cusd.com

Clovis West High School (CWHS) is a co-educational, public high school part of the Clovis Unified School District in the well-established suburban community in northeast Fresno, California. It was founded in 1976, and has grades 9–12. Clovis West High School is ranked 206th within California. The student body makeup is 49 percent male and 51 percent female, and the total minority enrollment is 67 percent, primarily Hispanic. Clovis West High School is one of five high schools in the Clovis Unified School District. It is a National Blue Ribbon School and a California Distinguished School.

== Academics ==
=== State testing ===
In 2010, Clovis West High School attained an API of 852, placing the school towards the top of the California state high schools. The average SAT score for 2010-2011 is 509 (verbal), 540 (mathematics), and 515 (writing). Current results for the school's scoring are maintained at the California Standardized Testing And Reporting (STAR) Program.

== Athletics ==
Fall schedule

- Varsity Cross country
- Varsity/Junior Varsity/Freshman Football
- Girl's Varsity and Junior Varsity Golf
- Gymnastics
- Girl's Varsity and Junior Varsity Tennis
- Girl's Varsity/Junior Varsity/Freshman Volleyball
- Girl's Varsity and Junior Varsity Water polo
- Boy's Varsity and Junior Varsity Water Polo

Winter schedule

- Boy's Varsity/Junior Varsity/Freshman Basketball
- Girl's Varsity/Junior Varsity/Freshman Basketball
- Boy's Varsity/Junior Varsity/Freshman Soccer
- Girl's Varsity/Junior Varsity/Freshman Soccer
- Wrestling

Spring schedule

- Boy's Varsity/Junior Varsity/Freshman Baseball
- Boy's Varsity and Junior Varsity Golf
- Girl's Varsity/Junior Varsity/Freshman Softball
- Swimming and Diving
- Boy's Varsity and Junior Varsity Tennis
- Track and field
- Boy's Varsity/Junior Varsity/Freshman Volleyball

Clovis West High School competes in the California Interscholastic Federation's (CIF) Central Section. The Clovis Olympic Swim Complex, located at Clovis West High School plays host to the CIF State Swim and Dive Championships.

== Performing arts ==
Instrumental Music

- Wind Symphony
- Symphonic Band
- Concert Band
- Color Guard
- Winter Guard
- Jazz Band
- Marching Band
- Percussion
- String Orchestra
- Chamber Orchestra

Choral Music

- Chamber Singers
- Concert Choir
- Women's Chorale
- Women's Ensemble

Drama

- Improv Team
- Mock Trial

Folklorico

- Flamenco

=== Winter Guard International ===
Clovis West High School has a percussion program in San Joaquin Valley Color Guard and Percussion Review (SJVCGPR) and Winter Guard International. Clovis West debuted its marching percussion program in the first-ever WGI Percussion competition in 1992.

In the 2022 SJVCGPR season, Clovis West High School's percussion program received first place in every competition they participated in. This continued the program's tradition of excellence and cemented their status as one of the top percussion programs in the region. Clovis West's success has inspired and influenced many other programs in the area, and the program continues to be a source of pride for the school and its community.

== Notable events ==
• During February 2023 multiple threats were made to Clovis West High School. The first threat resulted in many armed police officers with rifles searching the school for a potential threat.

== Notable alumni ==
- Joan Pitcock, (1967-) American professional golfer who played on the LPGA Tour with 1 tour win.
- Nadine Crocker, actress and filmmaker
- Zubin Damania, physician, comedian, internet personality, musician, and founder of Turntable Health
- Kevin Federline (1978-), Dancer, musician, and actor.
- Tyler Ferguson, MLB pitcher for the Oakland Athletics and the Chicago Cubs
- Dan Klatt (1978-), American water polo player. Member of the 2004 U.S. Olympic water polo team in Athens.
- Nwanneka Okwelogu (Nikki) (1995-), track and field athlete, member of the 2016 Nigerian Olympic Athletics team.
- Aaron Ruell (1976-), American actor and director. Most notable for his role as "Kip" in Napoleon Dynamite.
- Jeff Tuel (1991-), American football quarterback for the Buffalo Bills.
- Billy Volek (1976-), American football quarterback for the San Diego Chargers.
- Michael J. Willett (1989-), American musician and actor.
- Damien Richardson (1976-), American football safety for the Carolina Panthers
- Ruth Lawanson (1963-) Olympic medalist. American Volleyball player. She was on the U.S. national team for four years. She won bronze medals with the team at the 1990 World Championships, 1991 World Cup, and 1992 Summer Olympics.
- Amanda Leighton (1993-) voice actress
- Kevin Pickford (1975-) Major League Baseball pitcher
- Adrian Martinez (2000-) American football quarterback for the San Francisco 49ers
