= Jessie Lopez De La Cruz =

American farm worker

- Born: Jesuita Lopez; 1919; Anaheim, California
- Died: September 2, 2013 (aged 93–94); Fresno, California
- Occupation: Farmworker Teacher Activist
- Years active: 1960-2013
- Organization: UFW National Land for People Democratic Party National Convention Universidad Libre de Campesinos
- Movement: Farm Workers Rights
- Spouse: Arnulfo (Arnold) De La Cruz

Jessie Lopez De La Cruz (1919 – September 2, 2013) was a Chicano American farm worker, the first female recruiter for the UFW, an organizer and participant in UFW strikes, a community organizer, a working mother, and a delegate to the 1972 Democratic National Convention. She ran the first UFW Hiring Hall, was an adviser to the California Commission on the Status of Women, and the secretary treasurer of National Land for People (an organization that worked to break up land monopolies in the San Joaquin Valley). Lopez-De La Cruz is also known for her work banning the short-handled hoe, her work educating fellow farm workers, her work promoting co-op farming, and her commitment to fighting injustice for the working poor.

== Early life ==
=== Early childhood ===
Jessie Lopez was born in Anaheim, California, in 1919 to parents Guadalupe Lopez and Fermin Fuentes. Lopez's birthfather is unknown, Fuentez was her step father who fled the country in 1931 after an altercation with another man. Lopez was the oldest of 3 daughters, and lived in a medium- to large-size extended family consisting of herself and her two sisters, Grandfather Basilio, Grandmother Rita, Mother Guadalupe, Uncle Edward, Uncle Dionisio, Aunt Dominga, Aunt Guillerma, Uncle Gregorio, Aunt (Referred to as sister because of their close age) Maria, and Basilo Jr. Lopez's mother, Guadalupe Lopez, was a native of Aguascalientes, Mexico and her birth father's background is unknown.

=== Working-class roots ===
Lopez started working in Southern California fields in and around Orange County, California, at 5 years old, doing such work as: pruning vines, picking oranges, peas, beets, prunes, cotton, and grapes. She resided in Anaheim until she was 9 years old, after which point her family began traveling as migrant field workers. Her family was poor, and worked in mostly agrarian labor jobs, but it is noted that one of her uncles was a street maker in Orange County during the development of the 1920s.

=== Education ===
Even though Lopez was a laborer at an early age, she also attended school. She remembered attending 45 schools as her family moved as migrant workers in Los Angeles county and the San Gabriel and San Joaquin valleys, including Las Palmas School in Anaheim off and on from 1st to 3rd grade. In winter 1929, after returning to LA from Arvin, California, she attended 109th street elementary along with her siblings. She was the best English speaker in her house and assisted the other children with their schoolwork.

=== Tragedy in early life (1929–1933) ===
Beginning in 1929, the Lopez family began migrating north for work. In that year, they arrived in Arvin, California, in the San Joaquin Valley and worked as a crew picking cotton. Her Aunt Maria, who Jessie recalled as her sister because of their close age and sister like relationship, was killed in a tragic accident when her dress caught fire, causing her to perish. In January 1930, her mother Guadalupe fell ill and was bedridden by February. She died on March 11, 1930, and was laid to rest in Compton, California. After the death of their mother, Lopez and her sisters moved back to Anaheim with their grandparents. Her grandfather Basillo returned to cotton picking in the San Joaquin Valley to support them, but fell ill shortly after and died of dropsy on June 14, 1930. The depression years were tough on the Lopez family. In 1931 they became migrant workers again, often sleeping roadside in a tent.

=== First experience with labor organizing ===
In 1932 the Lopez family found themselves in San Clemente (on the Orange County/San Diego County border) picking snap peas for low pay; 10 cents per hour for adults and nothing for the children. Next they traveled to San Juan Capistrano to pick beans, and upon arrival the family saw what Lopez described as a "parade like" collection of workers. The family camped out near the field for two days and they observed the strike. A man from the Mexican Consulate came down to the field from Los Angeles to talk to the growers and the workers since many of them were Mexican. He asked Lopez for help with English translations since she was one of the only bilingual persons there. Lopez enjoyed this because she said she "felt useful" and she remembered it as her first experience in a labor dispute. They moved back to Anaheim, and in April 1933 the family lost the home that Grandfather Basilo built because they were unable to pay a $150 property tax. In 1933 the Lopez family relocated again to the San Joaquin Valley following the crops. Upon arrival to Arvin, California, fields they encountered another strike of hundreds of diverse farm workers, and instead of becoming scabs, they joined in the fight. They headed north for work, finding hard labor in Sacramento in the summer of 1933 picking cotton and grapes.

=== Permanent relocation to the San Joaquin Valley ===
When their truck broke down in Mendota, California, Grandmother Rita decided that it was better for them to stay in the valley where there was always work instead of returning to Anaheim like they originally planned. After floods destroyed their camp in Mendota, they moved south to Weedpatch, California, and took up residence in an abandoned granary. The family was still poor, and they pulled mustard greens and wild mushrooms from ditch banks for food and drank potentially dangerous and contaminated water collected in large barrels infested with bugs. At school one day Lopez began displaying signs of illness and was kept in the basement for the remainder of the day; it was typhoid fever, most likely contracted from the contaminated water, and she was kept in isolation at a Bakersfield hospital until overcoming the illness. From 1933 to 1936 Her family continued to migrate up and down the Valley for work, including back breaking labor such as picking onions using a short-handled hoe.

== Motherhood and the 1940s and 1950s ==
=== Settling down ===
Lopez met Arnulfo (to be referred to as Arnold for the remainder of this article) De La Cruz in 1933 while living in the same labor camp. They became close in 1935 and on November 27, 1938, they eloped, and were officially married on December 18, 1938, in a Catholic church in Firebaugh, California. There was no honeymoon; Arnold was back to work the next day and Jessie moved in with his family to help with the 10 children. The couple followed the crops for 7 years, then permanently settled in Huron, California. They had 6 children: Raymond (1939), Arnold (1942), Guadalupe (1943, she died as an infant), Alfred (1944), Bobby (1946), and Virginia (1947). She also took on her niece Susan, after Lopez's sister died.

=== Working ===
From 1939 to 1956, the De La Cruz family worked for the Russell Giffen cotton company. In Huron where they lived from 1944 to 1956, Lopez-De La Cruz worked in a lunch truck that served Braceros. Her cooking and services were popular with fieldworkers and community members. She worked in the truck, raised her children, and worked in the fields with her husband and children. It was during this time that Gary Soto says that Lopez became vocally aware of the injustices faced by farm workers. He noted that Lopez-De La Cruz observed Mexican Americans working in brutally hot conditions, foremen stealing and pocketing workers Social security, state, and federal taxes, company stores on farms charging on average 3 times more than stores in the city knowing that farm workers would only have easy access to the company store; as well as issues like the lack of access to higher education for children of farm workers and the unfair wage hierarchy between racial groups on the farms. In 1957 they moved to Parlier, California.

== Activism- The 1960s–70s and the UFW ==
=== Getting involved in the UFW ===
In December 1965 Arnold became involved with Cesar Chavez and the NFWA (Later to become the UFW), and they began having meetings at the De La Cruz family home. Lopez-De La Cruz stayed at a distance and served the organizers food and drinks, but became a NFWA member after Cesar Chavez said that Jessie "belonged here." In an oral history, Lopez-De La Cruz remembered Cesar saying, "The women have to be involved. They're the ones working out in the fields with their husbands, if you can take women into the fields with their husbands you can certainly take them to meetings." Soon after, Lopez- De La Cruz was given materials to go into fields and enroll farm workers into the union throughout Parlier, Reedly, Dinuba, and Orange Cove. She enrolled year round resident workers and migrant workers, as well as green card workers from Mexico. Between 1965 and 1972, no organizer signed up as many union members as Jessie Lopez De La Cruz. After the decision that the NFWA would support the AWOC strike, Lopez- De La Cruz and other NFWA members started picketing stores and growers. She patrolled sides of tractor paths, and encouraged scabs to consider joining the union struggle. When the NFWA became the UFW, Lopez-De La Cruz and the union members continued to struggle for poor immigrant and Chicana/o workers rights and dignity. Along with labor, issues like long-term health effects of pesticides and hard labor, reproductive justice, quality and length of life for farm workers, and unfair hiring procedures like those of corrupt contratistas, were also discussed.

=== Hiring hall and community work ===
In 1968, Lopez-De La Cruz ran the first UFW hiring hall which was built next to the De La Cruz home. She collected membership dues, printed announcements for rallies, and distributed groceries that were donated by churches, social agencies, and private citizens. Lopez-De La Cruz also assisted farmworkers by translating for them, taking them to the doctors, writing letters, and filling out paperwork for those who could not write. In addition to her work protesting, organizing, and running the hiring hall; Lopez-De La Cruz acted as an interpreter for farm workers and often testified at hearings on farm labor, pushed for food stamps for farm workers in Fresno, pushed for bilingual education, and was eventually appointed to community and state organizations like the Fresno County Economic Opportunity Commission, the Central California Action Associates (Community education project where she taught English to Farm workers), and California's Commission on the Status of Women. In 1966 Lopez-De La Cruz volunteered to teach farm workers practical English at the CCAA in an old building on Olive Avenue in Fresno, California. When the CCAA got a local TV show on Fresno's Channel 53, Lopez-De La Cruz enthusiastically taught English on the show for a short period that ended when Arnold's truck broke down. Lopez-De La Cruz also assisted the UFW by consulting as an expert farmworker. In 1971, Dolores Huerta reached out to Lopez-De La Cruz to help her negotiate a contract with Christian Brothers Wine Company. Since she was a farm worker and Huerta was not, Lopez-De La Cruz could accurately know how much work was acceptable and for what pay. In 1972 she represented the Christian Brothers Workers at the first convention of the United Farm Workers of America in Fresno.

=== Being a female organizer ===
In an oral history, Lopez-De La Cruz remembered some circumstances of being a female labor organizer. "It was very hard being a woman organizer. Many of our people my age and older were raised with the old customs where the husband rules and the wife obeys… Neighbors in Parlier were for the union, but they were not taking orders from women." She suggested reforms to make the union more inclusive to women, for example her "suggestion" to add women to the all-male ranch committee of Christian Brothers Wine Company, and her push to end a ban on women pruning, making higher paying work available to women's crews at the Christian Brothers Wine Company. She also remembered how women took the lead in volunteering for store front picket lines and engaging customers in conversations about the struggle. Aside from being an efficient and passionate organizer, Lopez-De La Cruz is remembered for her incredible wit. Many stories have survived of her ability to invoke humor and justice in situations. For example, after being red bated at a picket line at a Fresno Safeway in the mid-1960s and being asked by a white man "how do you say communists in Spanish?", she responded "Ustedes Ganaran" (You shall win), and the man went on to passionately shout the phrase while UFW members looked on and laughed.

=== Democratic National Convention (1972) ===
In 1972 Lopez-De La Cruz went to Miami to participate in the Democratic National Convention as a delegate. She had enrolled many Chicano voters in Central California after officially registering to vote in 1968. At the convention she and Dolores Huerta were heckled by anti-UFW George Wallace supporters who wore lettuce in their hats to mock the UFW members who were at the time on a lettuce strike. In her Studs Terkel oral history, Jessie remembered being called a radical and a troublemaker, and remembered being called a radical communist by a news reporter. Upon returning from the 1972 Democratic National Convention, Lopez-De La Cruz went south to Calexico to pick tomatoes with her nephews.

== Cooperative farming and National Land for People ==
=== Rancho El Bracero ===
After returning from Calexico, Lopez-De La Cruz and her husband recognized the power of their labor and knowledge and became inspired to start their own farm. In spring 1973 they started their own farm with five other families, thanks to Rodger McAfee (the same small farmer responsible for sending the $102,000 bail out to Angela Davis in 1972), who leased them 6 acres. They had some success as the first people to grow, sell, and nationally distribute cherry tomatoes under the label Rancho El Bracero (Also the name of their farm.) They made $64,000 off the sales from the cherry tomatoes, and used that money to purchase land. In 1974, the Lopez-De La Cruz family and three other families decided to purchase 40 acres near Raisin City, California, and started their own cooperative farm selling cherry tomatoes and other produce to local and national sellers. They attempted to expand their land and acquire some land with water by purchasing land from millionaire farmer Giffen, but he refused to sell any plot for less than a half of a million dollars.

=== National Land for People ===
The Lopez-De La Cruz family were members of the National Land for People; an organization founded by former UFW photographer George Ballis that sought out ways to break up large agricultural holdings into small family farms. They believed that when "land was held narrowly, freedom withers," and they were critical of the system of large growers profiting off bargain priced water provided by the government while small family farms and co-ops struggled to get the water they needed. The National Land for People advocated water reclamation and the enforcement of The Reclamation Act of 1902 and pesticide free farming. According to The Reclamation Act of 1902, farmers may not obtain more than 160 acres of federally subsidized water. Their leader created a 23-minute film titled The Richest Land that juxtaposed small farmers and corporate farmers, and Jessie Lopez De La Cruz and Dolores Huerta both made cameos. On July 17, 1974, Lopez-De La Cruz found herself again on the political stage, speaking to the US Senate before the Select Committee on Small Business; she shared her life story and asked for the Senators to come to Fresno to listen to the needs of poor farm workers. Again in 1976, the National Land for People made its way to Washington to challenge congressional leaders to enforce water rights laws.

== Later life ==
=== Back to school and award from the League of Mexican American Women ===
In 1977 Lopez-De La Cruz went back to school to study typing, psychology, sociology, and history at Universidad Libre de Campesinos (Farmworkers Free University). While continuing her work with the National Land for People, Lopez-De La Cruz expanded her activism to speaking at colleges, community meetings, national conferences, and government hearings on food, farming, land redistribution, farm workers struggles, the 1902 laws surrounding water rights and farm land, and her own experiences. She was recognized for her "outstanding contribution to the farm labor movement" by the League of Mexican American Women in 1977.

=== Banning the short-handled hoe ===
In 1985 Jessie was invited to speak to government officials about her experiences using the short-handled hoe, and how it created lifelong dehabilitating back injuries for herself and other farm workers. She asked government officials to walk around for a day holding the tips of their shoes. Later, California Legislators outlawed the hoe.

=== Retiring from the UFW ===
Lopez De La Cruz was active in the Union through the 1980s and finally retired from the UFW in February 1993, only 2 months before the death of Cesar Chavez. She was awarded with a certificate and an engraved bible for her services. She experienced hardship in 1994 when her trailer caught fire, and most of her belongings perished. In the mid and late 1990s she lived in a senior apartment building and continued to help people through community work; on the board of California Rural Legal Assistance, assisting farm workers and the rural poor defend their rights, and at Catholic Charities sorting clothing and food and distributing them to recipients in need.

In 1998 Jessie was one of the subjects of A Will of Their Own, a mini series produced by ABC featuring stories of female labor workers from the 1880s to the 1980s. She served as an advisor and a Spanish language coach to the actress Sônia Braga who played her in the series. During the 2000s she continued to volunteer for the UFW and has been an inspiration for a new generation of activists. In 2000, Chicano poet Gary Soto completed a biography about her called Jessie De La Cruz: A Profile of a United Farm Worker.

== Death ==
On September 2, 2013, Jessie Lopez De La Cruz died. Her funeral was held at St Johns Cathedral in Downtown Fresno, and it was attended by hundreds of loved ones, union members, and comrades including UFW members past and present such as Dolores Huerta. Huerta remembered Lopez-De La Cruz as a "courageous woman" with "so much dignity" she went on to say "people just loved Jessie because she was just such an inspiration to everybody." At her service, Lopez-De La Cruz was also remembered as "one of the best organizers the UFW ever had" by Arturo Rodriguez (current UFW president). Her grandson remembered her as someone who was dedicated to "fighting injustice." During the service, Jessie's coffin was covered with a giant UFW flag, and she was laid to rest in Fresno, California, at the age of 93.

== Sources ==
- Cantarow, Ellen (1980). Moving the Mountain: Women Working for Social Change. Old Westbury, New York: The Feminist Press. ISBN 0-07-020443-8.
- Terkel, Studs (1983). American Dreams: Lost and Found. New York: The New Press. ISBN 1-56584-545-5.
- Soto, Gary (2000). Jessie De La Cruz: A Profile of a United Farm Worker. New York: Persea Books. ISBN 978-0-89255-285-6.
