= Sycamore Valley =

Historic farm in North Carolina, United States

- U.S. National Register of Historic Places
- U.S. Historic district
- Location within North Carolina Location within the United States
- Location: NC 1400, near Grassy Creek, North Carolina
- Coordinates: 36°31′04″N 78°37′54″W
- Area: 32 acres (13 ha)
- Built: c. 1825
- Architectural style: Greek Revival, Georgian, Federal
- MPS: Granville County MPS
- NRHP reference No.: 88000419
- Added to NRHP: April 28, 1988

Sycamore Valley is a historic tobacco plantation house and national historic district located near Grassy Creek, Granville County, North Carolina. The original section of the house was built about 1825. The eight bay frame house consists of a two-story, central block flanked by lower two-story wings. It includes Greek Revival and Georgian / Federal style design elements. Also on the property are the contributing smokehouse, dairy barn, log tobacco barn, a stable, chicken house, corn crib, an packhouse.

It was listed on the National Register of Historic Places in 1988.
