= San Joaquin and Eastern Railroad =

Former railroad in California, United States

San Joaquin & Eastern Railroad
Overview
- Headquarters: Los Angeles, California
- Locale: Sierra Nevada foothills of Fresno County, California
- Dates of operation: 1912–1933

Technical
- Track gauge: 4 ft 8 1/2 in (1,435 mm) standard gauge

The San Joaquin & Eastern Railroad (SJ&E) was a standard gauge common carrier railroad that operated in the foothills of the Sierra Nevada Mountains of Fresno County in the U.S. state of California. The line was abandoned in 1933. The railroad hauled primarily lumber and agricultural products.

== History ==
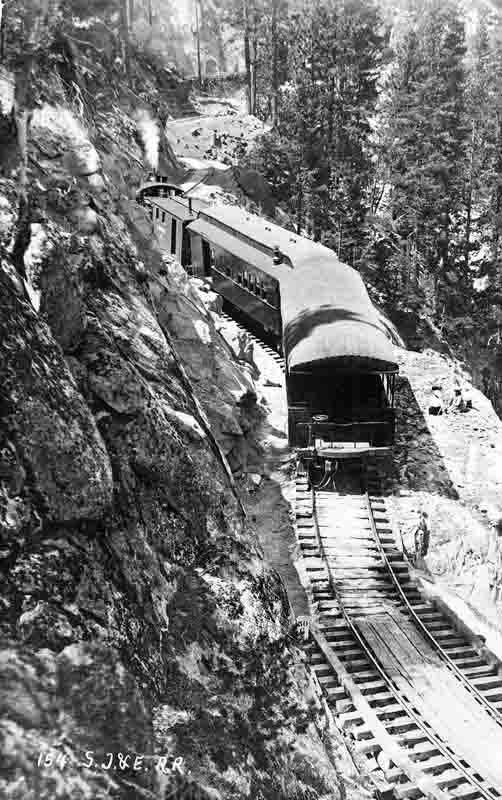
San Joaquin & Eastern Railroad at Huntington Lake c. 1918

The SJ&E was originally built to get men and supplies to the Big Creek Hydroelectric Project sites for the Pacific Light and Power Company (now Southern California Edison). The track was constructed for $1,055,728 by Stone & Webster Construction Company of Boston, the project's primary contractor. Grading commenced on February 16, 1912 and construction was completed on December 15, 1912. The 55 mile line started at El Prado (near Friant where it interchanged with the Southern Pacific Railroad. The SP branch continued on to Fresno where it intercepted the SP Mainline. From El Prado the line went east to Auberry and then terminated at Big Creek (Cascade/Cascada).

The railroad was known as the “crookedest railroad in the world”. The railroad featured 1073 curves up to 60 degrees. The railroad had 43 wooden trestles and 255 steep grades with the steepest at 5.3%.

The railroad was built for the sole reason of building the Big Creek hydroelectric project. When that was essentially complete, the need for the railroad ended. Over the years, it had only earned about 22% of what it cost to build and operate, leading to its nickname "Slow, Jerky, and Expensive. The line was abandoned and dismantled in 1933.

The caption on the picture is incorrect. The SJ&E ended at Big Creek. There was an incline that made it to the site of Huntington Lake for dam construction, but the RR proper never went that far.

== Route and station stops ==
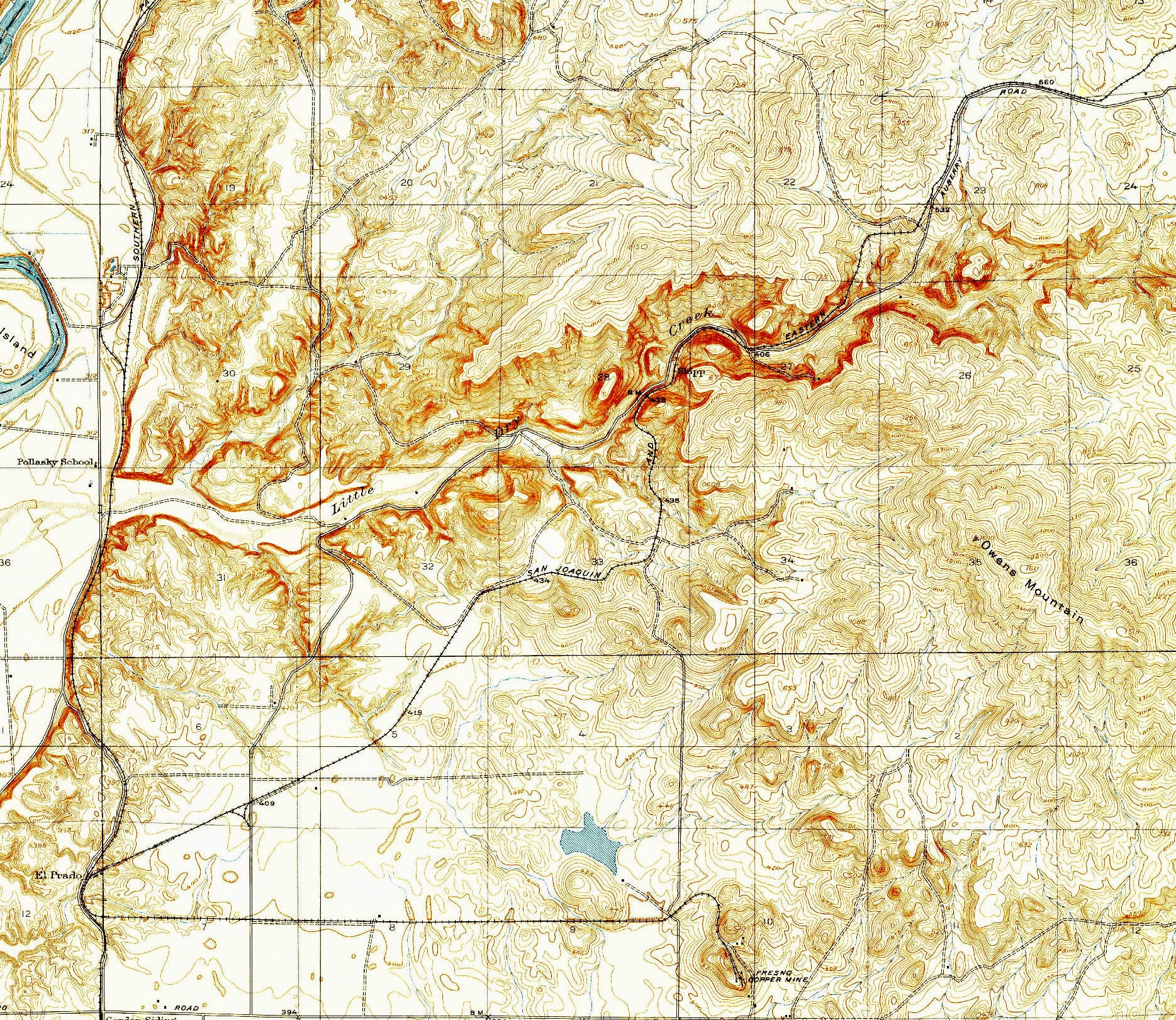
Western portion of route in 1922

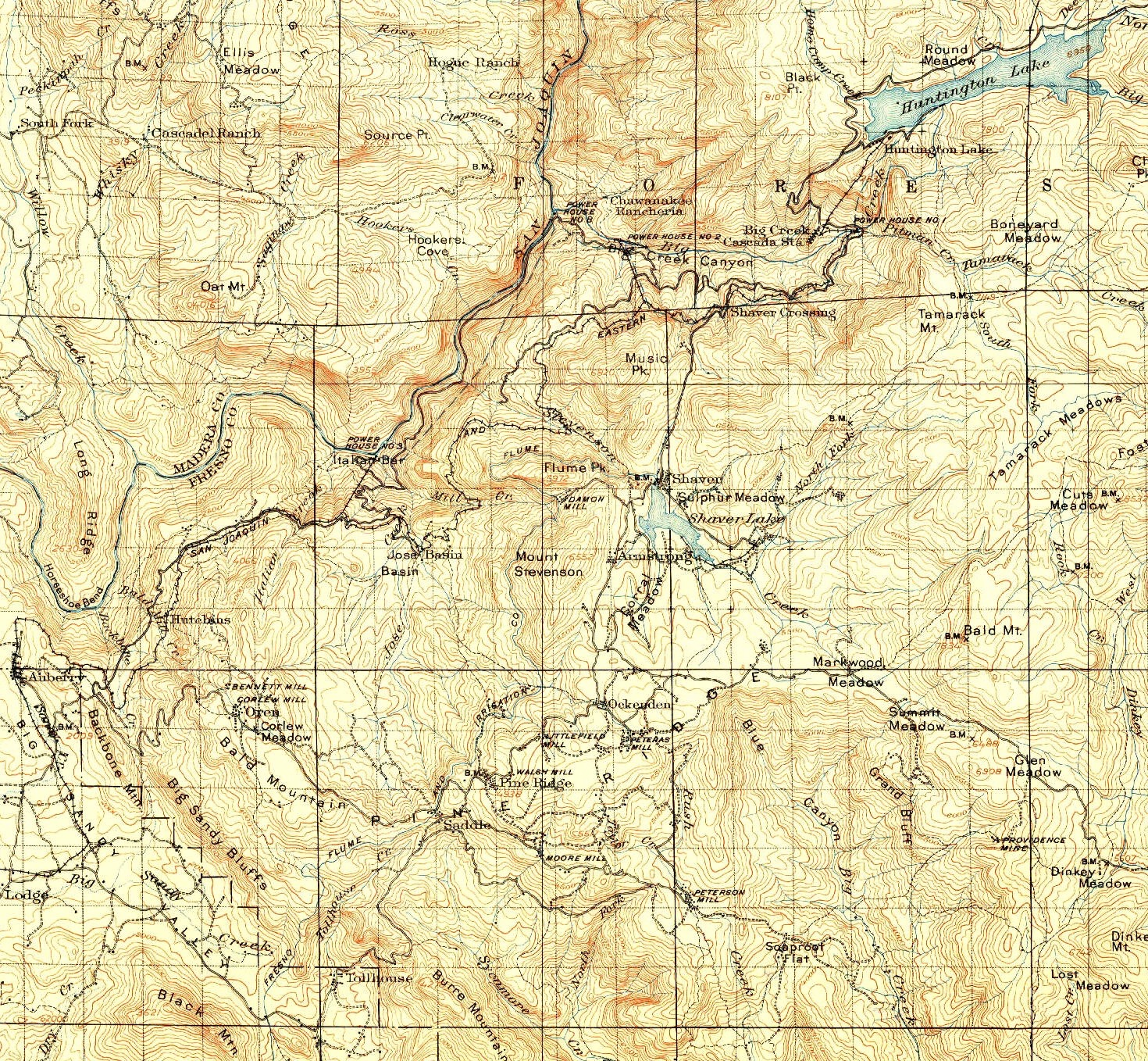
Eastern portion of route to Huntington Lake

- El Prado MP 0.0 (near Friant) (Interchange with Southern Pacific Railroad)
- McKenzie
- Wellbarn MP 16.1
- Lodge
- Prather this stop was known as Lodge Station in 1914 it is near where Lodge road is today
- Auberry MP 26.1 the original road bed is 'SJ and E Rd' today
- Indian Mission today it is known as Mono Wind
- Hutchens
- Lerona MP 34.9 the original road bed is known as 'Old Railroad Grade Bed Rd' today
- White Pine MP 43.0 near Shaver Crossing trestle
- West Portal MP 50.4 (with a 1-mile branch north to Powerhouse 2 on the San Joaquin River)
- Dawn Southern California Edison acquired Shaver Lake, and constructed a branch line from this point Shaver to build a new dam. Shaver Lake Railroad
- Big Creek (Cascada Station) MP 55.6
- Camp 2
- Dam 2 (of Huntington Lake)

== Passenger service ==
The railroad owned 5 passenger cars and the railroad's October 10, 1915 timetable showed an 8:00 a.m. departure from El Prado, arriving at Cascada at 2:25 p.m. The 55 mile trip operating on Mondays, Wednesdays and Fridays and returns on Tuesdays, Thursdays, and Saturdays. Passenger service continued as late as 1929. Some of the passenger traffic was attributed to tourists going to the resort at Huntington Lake during the summer.

== US Forest Service Fire Patrol ==
1913 U.S. Forest Service speeder fire patrol operated along the San Joaquin and Eastern Railroad, California. An auto mounted on car wheels and equipped with fire fighting tools.

== Locomotives ==
Number	Type	Builder	Works number	Date	Notes
100	Shay locomotive	Lima	2533	4/1912	sold in 1918 to English Lumber Company in Mount Vernon, Washington
101	Shay locomotive	Lima	2534	4/1912	sold in 1916 to Red River Lumber Company in Westwood, California
102	Shay locomotive	Lima	2564	7/1912	sold in 1918 to Edward Rutledge Timber Company in Coeur D'Alene, Idaho
103	Shay locomotive	Lima	2601	10/1912	leased in 1922 to Pacific Light and Power Company
104	Shay locomotive	Lima	2606	10/1912	sold in 1916 to Red River Lumber Company
