= Casson =

Yokuts Native American tribe

Cassons or Casson is the name of a Yokuts Native American tribe in central eastern California. The Cassons are also called the Gashowu. The Casson Yokuts territory extended from the eastern side of San Joaquin Valley floor eastward to the upper foothills, between the San Joaquin River to the north and Kings River to the south. The Cassons signed the Camp Barbour Treaty under Tom-quit, on the San Joaquin River, state of California, April 19, 1851. The treaty was signed by several Yokuts tribes and between Redick McKee, George W. Barbour, and O. M. Wozencraft, commissioners on the part of the United States of America.

Casson Yokuts territory included Madera County and parts of Fresno County. The three chiefs who signed for the Cassons were Domingo Perez, Tom-mas and Jose Antonio. Many Native Californians had acquired Spanish names during the Mission Period. The Cassons, like other Yokuts, and central California Native groups, were pushed from their homes in the San Joaquin Valley to reservations after they signed several treaties, including the Camp Barbour Treaty. The Barbour Treaty, Fremont Treaty and other California treaties were never ratified. Several Casson Yokuts families went to work for Yosemite in the early 1900s. Like the surrounding tribes, the Mono Paiutes and the Miwoks, they resided there half year and returned to their tribal areas. Later in the late 1920s, Yosemite National Park built homes for their Native American workers.
