= Turntable Health =

Health clinic in Las Vegas, US

Logo

Turntable Health was a direct primary care clinic in Downtown Las Vegas, Nevada. It began as part of Zappos CEO Tony Hsieh’s $350 million economic revitalization project in Downtown Las Vegas. The clinic was founded by Zubin Damania, known by his YouTube screen name as ZDoggMD, who Hsieh recruited from the Bay Area in 2012. The clinic was made in partnership with and in substantial part modeled on Iora Health, an innovative primary care chain led by Rushika Fernandopulle.

The clinic used a population health and disease prevention approach to improve patient health and lower costs over the long term. The clinic did not use the fee-for-service model and instead charged per patient per month capitation to sponsors, or $80 monthly membership fees to members. Because they were not paid on a piecemeal basis for individual services provided, physicians were able to spend 45 minutes or more in patient consultation (vs. 13-16 minutes in a more typical primary care setting). Individuals could gain access to Turntable as a benefit offered by an employer, through insurance, and directly as a subscription. Members were granted same-day visits with providers, 24/7 access to their doctor (by email, phone, or video), and a personal health coach. Using a similar model, Iora had experienced 35-40% lower hospitalization rates and 12-15% lower total healthcare costs than their community peers.

Turntable Health had been featured on TheNextWeb as one of "eight startups changing the healthcare industry," and there were plans to expand and build new locations as the clinic approached a capacity of 5,000 patients. However, Insurers were reluctant to adopt the clinic's capitation model, and were also unwilling to front near-term expenditures in hopes of reaping cost reductions that were anticipated over the 5-10 year timeframe, during which time insured patients could switch insurers, taking the long-term health and cost dividends to a competitor. Turntable Health shut down on January 31, 2017.
