= Auberry, California =

Auberry
- census-designated place
- Location in Fresno County and the state of California

- Location in the United States
- Coordinates: 37°03′58″N 119°24′07″W
- Country: United States
- State: California
- County: Fresno

Government
  - State Senator: Angelique Ashby (D)
  - State Assembly: Marc Berman (D)
  - U. S. Congress: Mike Thompson (D)

Area
  - Total: 46.83 sq mi (121.28 km^{2})
  - Land: 46.43 sq mi (120.25 km^{2})
  - Water: 0.40 sq mi (1.03 km^{2}) 0.32%
- Elevation: 2,018 ft (615 m)

Population (2020)
  - Total: 3,238
  - Density: 69.7/sq mi (26.93/km^{2})
- Time zone: UTC-8 (PST)
  - Summer (DST): UTC-7 (PDT)
- ZIP code: 93602
- Area code: 559
- FIPS code: 06-03190
- GNIS feature IDs: 1657963, 2407779

Auberry (/ˈɔːbɛri/) is a census-designated place (CDP) in Fresno County, California, United States. The population was 3,238 at the 2020 census. Auberry is located on Little Sandy Creek, 9.5 miles (15 km) west of Shaver Lake Heights, at an elevation of 2,018 feet (615 m).

== Geography ==
According to the United States Census Bureau, the CDP has a total area of 46.8 square miles (121 km^{2}), of which 46.4 square miles (120 km^{2}) is land and 0.4 square miles (1.0 km^{2}) (0.85%) is water.

=== Climate ===
Auberry has a Mediterranean climate (Köppen Csa) with cool, rainy winters and hot, dry summers. Its average annual precipitation is 26.3 in (670 mm). Its hardiness zone is 8a.

Climate data for Auberry, California, 1991–2020 normals, extremes 1915–2019
Month	Jan	Feb	Mar	Apr	May	Jun	Jul	Aug	Sep	Oct	Nov	Dec	Year
Record high °F (°C)	79 (26)	87 (31)	90 (32)	95 (35)	107 (42)	112 (44)	114 (46)	114 (46)	107 (42)	108 (42)	90 (32)	80 (27)	114 (46)
Mean daily maximum °F (°C)	54.4 (12.4)	57.1 (13.9)	61.6 (16.4)	67.6 (19.8)	77.4 (25.2)	87.3 (30.7)	94.4 (34.7)	93.2 (34.0)	87.5 (30.8)	75.3 (24.1)	62.3 (16.8)	53.7 (12.1)	72.7 (22.6)
Daily mean °F (°C)	45.8 (7.7)	48.3 (9.1)	52.0 (11.1)	56.6 (13.7)	65.0 (18.3)	73.9 (23.3)	81.3 (27.4)	80.2 (26.8)	74.9 (23.8)	63.9 (17.7)	52.5 (11.4)	45.2 (7.3)	61.6 (16.4)
Mean daily minimum °F (°C)	37.2 (2.9)	39.4 (4.1)	42.4 (5.8)	45.7 (7.6)	52.7 (11.5)	60.5 (15.8)	68.3 (20.2)	67.2 (19.6)	62.4 (16.9)	52.6 (11.4)	42.7 (5.9)	36.7 (2.6)	50.7 (10.4)
Record low °F (°C)	23 (−5)	25 (−4)	29 (−2)	25 (−4)	31 (−1)	41 (5)	42 (6)	47 (8)	43 (6)	27 (−3)	28 (−2)	20 (−7)	20 (−7)
Average precipitation inches (mm)	5.29 (134)	4.42 (112)	4.10 (104)	2.07 (53)	1.01 (26)	0.33 (8.4)	0.07 (1.8)	0.03 (0.76)	0.12 (3.0)	1.20 (30)	2.21 (56)	4.25 (108)	25.10 (638)
Average snowfall inches (cm)	0.5 (1.3)	0.5 (1.3)	0.6 (1.5)	0.1 (0.25)	0.0 (0.0)	0.0 (0.0)	0.0 (0.0)	0.0 (0.0)	0.0 (0.0)	0.0 (0.0)	0.0 (0.0)	0.3 (0.76)	2.0 (5.1)
Average precipitation days (≥ 0.01 in)	9.4	9.1	8.0	5.7	3.6	1.1	0.5	0.3	1.1	3.2	5.4	8.2	55.6
Average snowy days (≥ 0.1 in)	0.2	0.4	0.5	0.2	0.0	0.0	0.0	0.0	0.0	0.0	0.0	0.2	1.5
Source 1: NOAA
Source 2: WRCC (extremes)

== History ==
The Auberry post office was established in 1884, and following moves in 1887 and 1888, it was located at its present site in 1906. The place is named for Al Yarborough and is spelled phonetically as his name was pronounced.

The Auberry Band of the Mono people was called unaħpaahtyħ, (that which is on the other side [of the San Joaquin River]) in the Mono language.

Auberry was also a stop on the San Joaquin and Eastern Railroad, which was built to facilitate the construction of the Big Creek Hydroelectric Project.

== Demographics ==
Historical population
Census	Pop.	Note	%±
1990	1,866		—
2000	2,053		10.0%
2010	2,369		15.4%
2020	3,238		36.7%
U.S. Decennial Census; 1860–1870 1880-1890; 1900 1910 1920; 1930 1940 1950; 1960 1970 1980; 1990 2000 2010

Auberry first appeared as a census-designated place in the 1990 United States census.

=== Racial and ethnic composition ===
Auberry CDP, California – Racial and ethnic composition Note: the US Census treats Hispanic/Latino as an ethnic category. This table excludes Latinos from the racial categories and assigns them to a separate category. Hispanics/Latinos may be of any race.
Race / Ethnicity (NH = Non-Hispanic)	Pop 2000	Pop 2010	Pop 2020	% 2000	% 2010	% 2020
White alone (NH)	1,720	1,857	2,347	83.78%	78.39%	72.48%
Black or African American alone (NH)	8	8	14	0.39%	0.34%	0.43%
Native American or Alaska Native alone (NH)	88	74	249	4.29%	3.12%	7.69%
Asian alone (NH)	15	24	31	0.73%	1.01%	0.96%
Native Hawaiian or Pacific Islander alone (NH)	2	2	6	0.10%	0.08%	0.19%
Other race alone (NH)	0	5	15	0.00%	0.21%	0.46%
Mixed race or Multiracial (NH)	45	90	216	2.19%	3.80%	6.67%
Hispanic or Latino (any race)	175	309	360	8.52%	13.04%	11.12%
Total	2,053	2,369	3,238	100.00%	100.00%	100.00%

=== 2020 census ===
As of the 2020 census, Auberry had a population of 3,238. The population density was 69.7 inhabitants per square mile (26.9/km^{2}). The median age was 45.8 years. 22.1% of residents were under the age of 18 and 23.7% of residents were 65 years of age or older. For every 100 females there were 97.1 males, and for every 100 females age 18 and over there were 98.8 males age 18 and over.

All residents lived in rural areas. The census reported that 99.8% of the population lived in households, 0.2% lived in non-institutionalized group quarters, and no one was institutionalized.

There were 1,267 households in Auberry, of which 24.0% had children under the age of 18 living in them. Of all households, 55.3% were married-couple households, 6.2% were cohabiting couple households, 18.9% were households with a male householder and no spouse or partner present, and 19.6% were households with a female householder and no spouse or partner present. About 23.7% of all households were made up of individuals and 13.7% had someone living alone who was 65 years of age or older. The average household size was 2.55. There were 900 families (71.0% of all households).

There were 1,702 housing units at an average density of 36.7 units per square mile (14.2 units/km^{2}), of which 1,267 (74.4%) were occupied. Of occupied units, 80.7% were owner-occupied and 19.3% were occupied by renters. Of all housing units, 25.6% were vacant. The homeowner vacancy rate was 1.5% and the rental vacancy rate was 0.3%.

=== Income and poverty ===
The median household income was $75,000, and the per capita income was $36,622. About 8.8% of families and 10.7% of the population were below the poverty line.

== Education ==
Most of Auberry is served by the Sierra Unified School District for grades PreK-12; parts of it are served by the Pine Ridge Elementary School District and by Sierra USD for grades 9-12 only.
