= Shaver, California =

Coordinates: 37°08′47.6″N 119°17′55.8″W

Shaver is a former settlement in Fresno County, California, United States. It was located at the north end of Shaver Lake, where a post office operated from 1896 to 1925. The site is now under the waters of Shaver Lake.
