= National Register of Historic Places listings in Mono County, California =

Location of Mono County in California

This is a list of the National Register of Historic Places listings in Mono County, California.

This is intended to be a complete list of the properties and districts on the National Register of Historic Places in Mono County, California, United States. Latitude and longitude coordinates are provided for many National Register properties and districts; these locations may be seen together in a Google map.

There are 5 properties and districts listed on the National Register in the county, including 1 National Historic Landmark.

This National Park Service list is complete through NPS recent listings posted September 25, 2026.

== Current listings ==
	Name on the Register	Image	Date listed	Location	City or town	Description
1	Bodie Historic District	Bodie Historic District	October 15, 1966 (#66000213)	7 miles (11 km) south of Bridgeport on U.S. Route 395, then 12 miles (19 km) east on secondary road 38°12′56″N 119°00′41″W	Bridgeport	
2	Chalfant Petroglyph Site	Chalfant Petroglyph Site	November 21, 2000 (#00001324)	Address Restricted	Bishop	
3	Dry Lakes Plateau		November 21, 2002 (#02001394)	Address Restricted	Bodie Hills	A boundary increase was approved October 1, 2026.
4	Mono County Courthouse	Mono County Courthouse	March 1, 1974 (#74000536)	Main Street; 38°15′22″N 119°13′39″W	Bridgeport	
5	Yellow Jacket Petroglyphs		April 6, 2000 (#00000321)	Address Restricted	Bishop	

== See also ==
- List of National Historic Landmarks in California
- National Register of Historic Places listings in California
- California Historical Landmarks in Mono County, California
