= Four Gables =

Mountain in the state of California

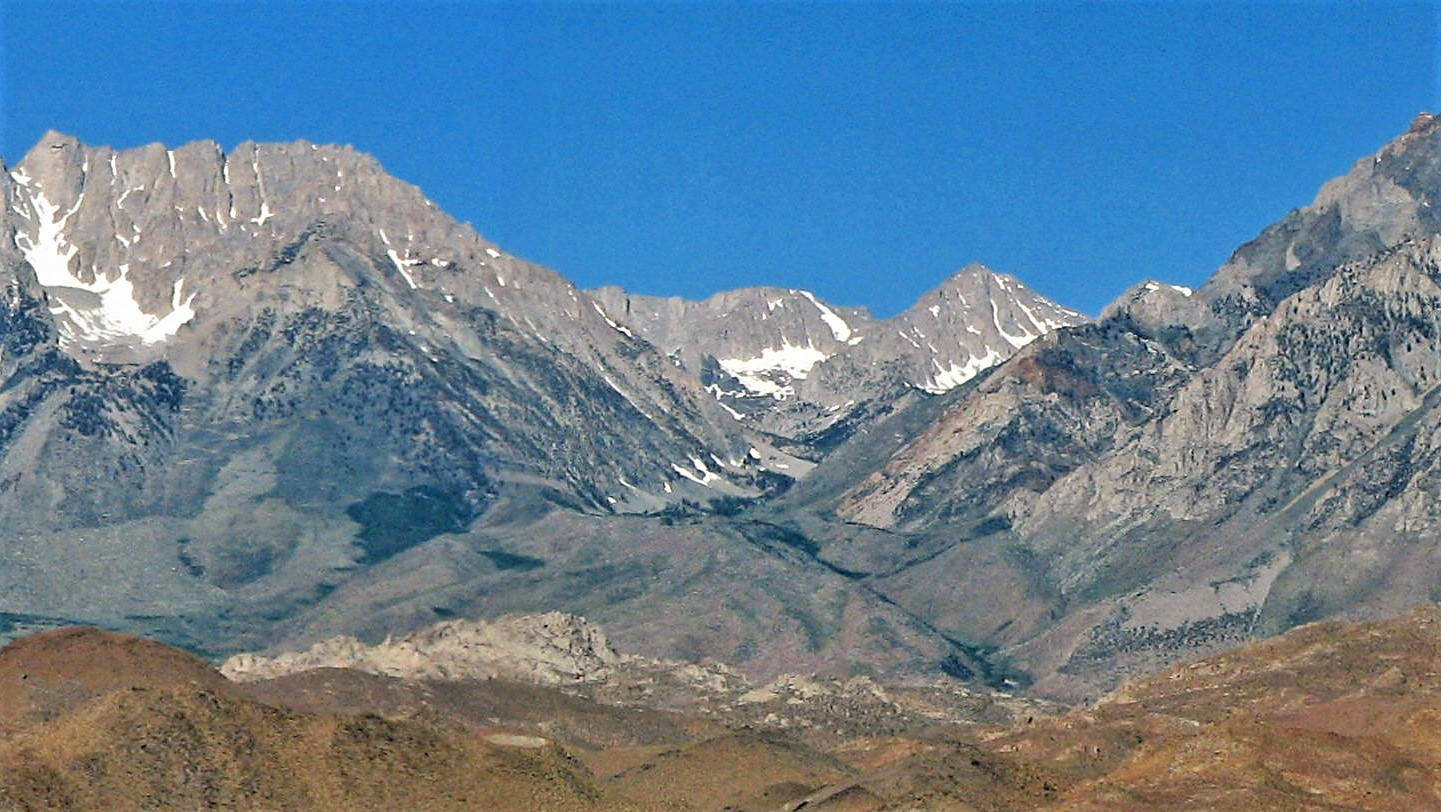
- East aspect, centered (Basin Mountain to left)

Highest point
- Elevation: 12,776 ft (3,894 m)
- Prominence: 80 ft (24 m)
- Isolation: 0.33 mi (0.53 km)
- Listing: Sierra Peaks Section; Vagmarken Club Sierra Crest List
- Coordinates: 37°18′09″N 118°42′00″W

Geography
- Location within California Location within the United States
- Location: Fresno / Inyo counties, California U.S.
- Parent range: Sierra Nevada
- Topo map: USGS Mount Tom

Geology
- Rock age: Cretaceous
- Mountain type: Fault block
- Rock type: Granodiorite

Climbing
- First ascent: 1931
- Easiest route: class 2

Four Gables, elevation 12,776 feet (3,894 m), is a mountain summit located on the crest of the Sierra Nevada mountain range in northern California, United States. It is situated in the John Muir Wilderness on the common boundary shared by Sierra National Forest with Inyo National Forest, and along the common border of Fresno County with Inyo County. Topographic relief is significant as the summit rises 2,800 feet (850 meters) above Horton Lake in approximately 1.5 miles (2.4 km). Neighbors include Basin Mountain, two miles to the east-southeast, Mount Tom, three miles to the northeast, and Merriam Peak, four miles to the west. The nearest community is Bishop, California, 17 miles to the east.

== History ==
Four Gables was likely named by the United States Geological Survey during a 1907–09 survey. This landforms's toponym was officially adopted in 1911 by the United States Board on Geographic Names.

The first ascent of the summit was made in 1931 by Norman Clyde, who is credited with 130 first ascents, most of which were in the Sierra Nevada.

== Climate ==
According to the Köppen climate classification system, Four Gables is located in an alpine climate zone. Most weather fronts originate in the Pacific Ocean, and travel east toward the Sierra Nevada mountains. As fronts approach, they are forced upward by the peaks (orographic lift), causing them to drop their moisture in the form of rain or snowfall onto the range. Precipitation runoff from Four Gables' west slope drains to South Fork San Joaquin River via Piute Creek, whereas the east side of this mountain drains to Owens River via Horton, Gable, and Pine Creeks.

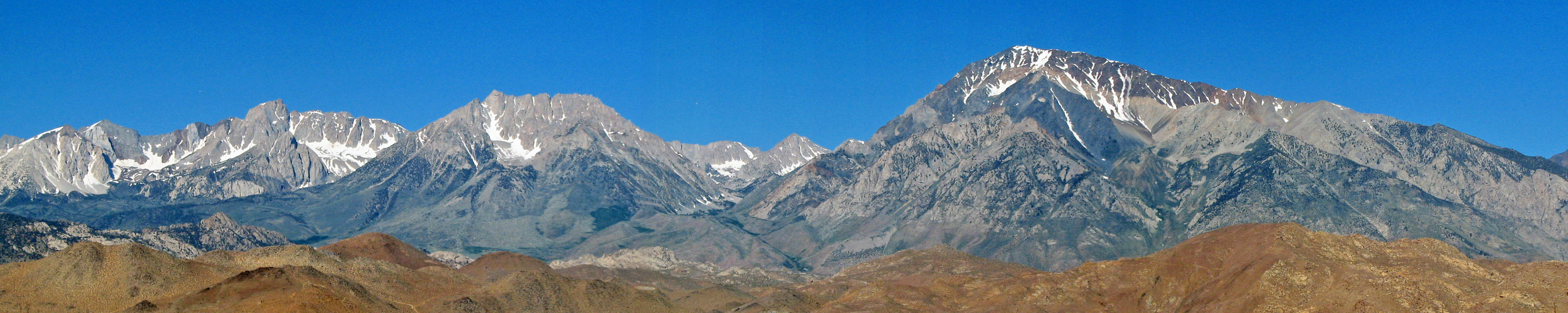
Sierra Nevada from near Bishop, California. Four Gables is centered in back appearing small. To left are Mount Humphreys and Basin Mountain. To right is Mount Tom

== See also ==
- List of the major 4000-meter summits of California
