= Bishop Petroglyphs =

There are multiple prehistoric petroglyphs (rock markings) in the area of Bishop, California (Inyo County, near Mono County) that may be called the Bishop Petroglyphs.

- Yellow Jacket Petroglyphs
- Chalfant Petroglyph Site
- Big and Little Petroglyph Canyons
- Coso Rock Art District
