= Basin Mountain =

Basin Mountain may refer to:

- Basin Mountain (California)
- Basin Mountain (New York)
