= Sad Boulders =

Bouldering area in California

- The Sads
- Nearest city: Bishop, California
- Type of climbing: Bouldering
- Technical grades: V0 - V13
- Rock type: Volcanic Rock
- Classic climbs: The Fang V4; Strength in Numbers V5; Molly V5

The Sad Boulders or The Sads is a popular bouldering destination near Bishop, California in the Eastern Sierra.

Boulders in the area are composed of volcanic rock (Bishop Tuff), scattered within and along a canyon in the Volcanic Tableland neighboring the Happy Boulders. These volcanic rock boulders offer climbing easier on the skin than the nearby Buttermilk Boulders.

There are over 240 boulder problems in the half-mile long canyon.

In the early 1990s, the area was known only to local climbers, though it eventually became a worldwide destination for thousands of climbers by the end of the decade.
