= KSRW =

KSRW may refer to:

- KSRW (FM), a radio station (92.5 FM) licensed to Independence, California, United States
- KSRW-LP, a defunct low-power television station (channel 33) formerly licensed to Mammoth Lakes, California, United States
