= Happy Boulders =

Bouldering area in California

- The Happys
- Nearest city: Bishop, California
- Type of climbing: Bouldering
- Technical grades: V0 - V14
- Rock type: Volcanic Rock
- Classic climbs: Heavenly Path V1; The Hulk V6; Atari V6

The Happy Boulders or The Happys is a popular bouldering destination near Bishop, California in the Eastern Sierra.

Boulders in the area are composed of volcanic rock (Bishop Tuff), scattered within and along a canyon in the Volcanic Tableland neighboring the Sad Boulders. These volcanic rock boulders offer climbing easier on the skin than the nearby Buttermilk Boulders.

There are over 500 boulder problems in the roughly 2000 foot long canyon, almost all within 10 minutes of each other.

In the early 1990s, the area was known only to local climbers, though it eventually became a worldwide destination for thousands of climbers by the end of the decade.

In 2000, Sam Edwards made the first ascent of Goldfish Trombone V14 (then V13).
