= KBOV =

Simulcast with KIBS, Bishop, California
- Bishop, California; United States
- Frequency: 1230 kHz
- Branding: 100.7 KIBS

Programming
- Format: Country
- Affiliations: ABC News Radio, Los Angeles Dodgers Radio Network, Fox News Radio

Ownership
- Owner: Great Country Broadcasting, Inc.
- Sister stations: KIBS

History
- First air date: 1953
- Former call signs: KIBS (1953–1985)
- Call sign meaning: Beautiful Bishop & Owens Valley

Technical information
- Licensing authority: FCC
- Facility ID: 24947
- Class: C
- Power: 1,000 watts
- Transmitter coordinates: 37°20′43.7″N 118°23′46.4″W

Links
- Public license information: Public file; LMS
- Website: kibskbov.com

KBOV (1230 AM) is a radio station that simulcast's KIBS to the Bishop, California, United States area. The station is currently owned by Great Country Broadcasting, Inc. and features programming from ABC Radio.

The station signed on in 1953 as KIBS. It was the only radio station in Bishop until it launched KIBS-FM in 1967. The FM failed and went silent in 1969. It was resurrected under the ownership of former KIBS DJ Roy Mayhugh in 1978 as KIOQ.

KBOV would be a Classic Hits station until July 18 or 19 2026. KBOV has started to Simulcast KIBS-FM, for a while the Classical Hits Format returned at the end of July but as of today KBOV is still simulcasting its sister station. It is unknown whether this is a permanent or temporary change. Even though KBOV is simulcasting KIBS, KBOV still airs Dodgers games as an affiliate of the Dodgers Radio Network. While KIBS keeps airing its normal programming during Dodgers games.
