= California Historical Landmarks in Mono County =

This list includes properties and districts listed on the California Historical Landmark listing in Mono County, California. Click the "Map of all coordinates" link to the right to view a Google map of all properties and districts with latitude and longitude coordinates in the table below.

Image		Landmark name	Location	City or town	Summary
Bodie	341	Bodie	Bodie State Historic Park; 38°12′44″N 119°00′44″W	Bridgeport	
Dog Town	792	Dog Town	State Hwy 395; 38°10′13″N 119°11′51″W	Bridgeport	
Trail of the John C. Fremont 1844 Expedition	995	Trail of the John C. Fremont 1844 Expedition	Big Bend-Mountain Gate area, Toiyabe National Forest; 38°20′54″N 119°21′43″W	Bridgeport	

== See also ==
- List of California Historical Landmarks
- National Register of Historic Places listings in Mono County, California
