= KIBS =

- Bishop, California; United States
- Frequency: 100.7 MHz
- Branding: 100.7 KIBS

Programming
- Format: Country
- Affiliations: ABC News Radio, Westwood One, Fox News Radio

Ownership
- Owner: Great Country Broadcasting, Inc.
- Sister stations: KBOV

History
- First air date: November 21, 1978
- Former call signs: KIOQ-FM (1978–1985)
- Call sign meaning: could mean Inyo Broadcasting System or Inyo Bishop Sierra (KBOV old call letters)

Technical information
- Licensing authority: FCC
- Facility ID: 24945
- Class: B
- ERP: 1,000 watts
- HAAT: 902.0 meters
- Transmitter coordinates: 37°24′41″N 118°11′10″W
- Translators: KBOV (1230 kHz, Bishop, CA) K221DR (92.1 MHz, Round Mountain, NV) K261AY (100.1 MHz Bridgeport, CA) K269AV (101.7 MHz Tonopah, NV) K272AE (102.3 MHz Hawthorne, NV) K285EH (104.9 MHz Mina, NV)

Links
- Public license information: Public file; LMS
- Webcast: Listen Live

KIBS (100.7 FM) is a radio station broadcasting a country music format. Licensed to Bishop, California, United States, the station is currently owned by Great Country Broadcasting, Inc.

== History ==
Originally KIBS-FM went on the air on 1967 but went off the air in 1969. John Young bought KIBS-AM in 1985 and soon after Bought KIOQ-FM in Bishop, CA. He then switched the KIBS call letters to the FM dial at 100.7.
