= Yellow Jacket Petroglyphs =

Archaeological site in California, United States

- U.S. National Register of Historic Places
- Nearest city: Bishop, California
- Area: 9.9 acres (4.0 ha)
- NRHP reference No.: 00000321
- Added to NRHP: April 6, 2000

The Yellow Jacket Petroglyphs, also known as CA-MNO-2189, are a 9.9-acre (4.0 ha) pre-Columbian archaeological site located in Mono County, California near Bishop, California. The site includes over 200 petroglyphs created by Paiute inhabitants of the region between 2950 B.C. and 1850 A.D. A wide array of design elements were used in the petroglyphs; the majority are abstract curved figures, but abstract lines, anthropomorphs, human and animal tracks, and cupules are also present. The site also includes remnants of human inhabitation, such as stacks of rocks thought to signify house sites, stone tools, ceramics, and animal remains.

The site was listed on the National Register of Historic Places in 2000. The National Park Service has not disclosed the exact location of the site due to its sensitive nature.
