= Chalfant Petroglyph Site =

Archaeological site in California, United States

- U.S. National Register of Historic Places
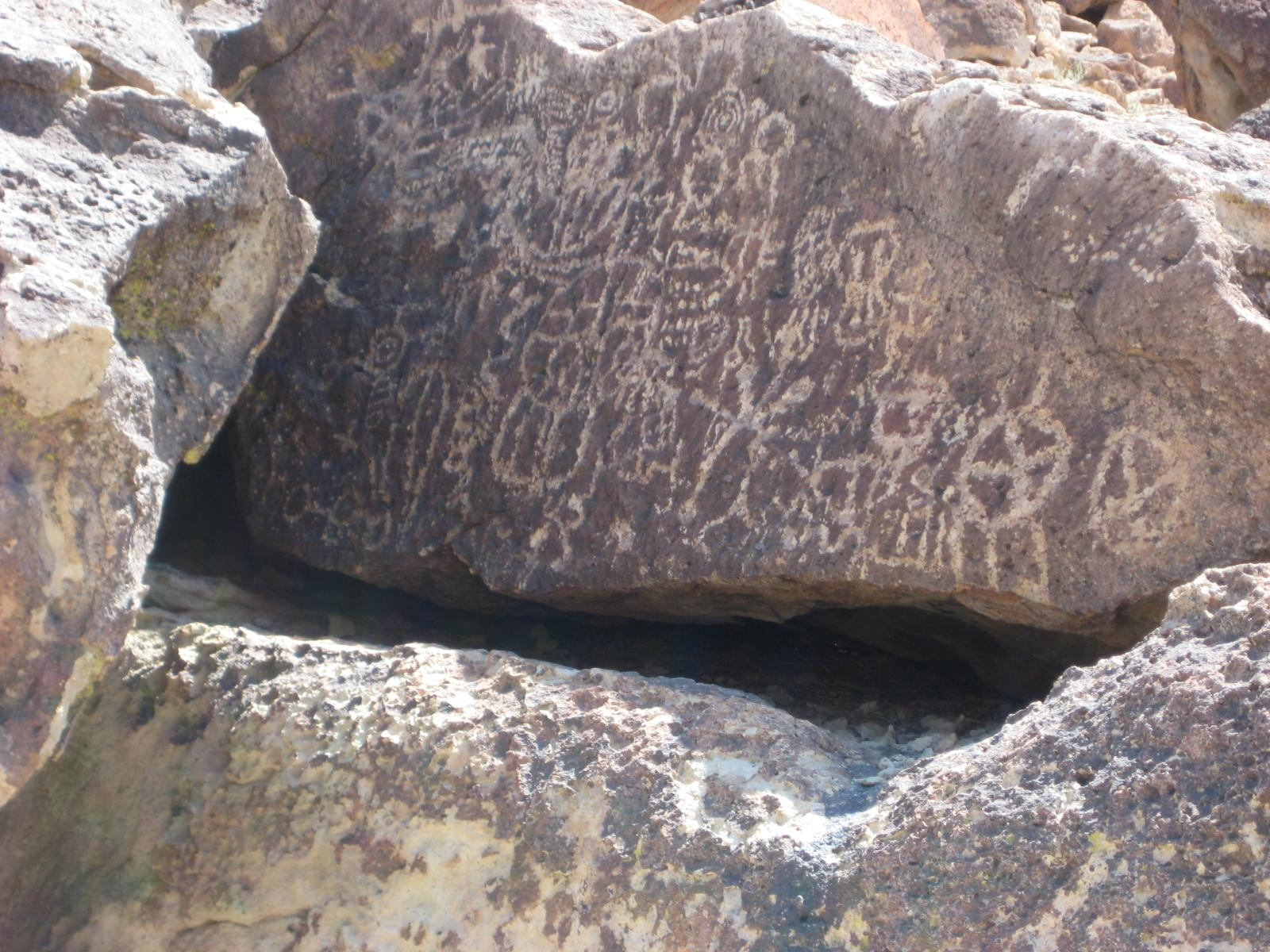
- Chalfant petroglyphs
- Nearest city: Bishop
- Area: 3.5 acres (1.4 ha)
- NRHP reference No.: 00001324
- Added to NRHP: November 21, 2000

The Chalfant Petroglyph Site, also known as CA-MNO-7, is a 3.5-acre (1.4 ha) archeological site in the Chalfant Valley volcanic tablelands, above Bishop in Mono County, eastern California.

The petroglyphs and archaeological site were listed on the National Register of Historic Places in 2000.

== See also ==
- Coso Rock Art District
- Northern Paiute
