= KSRW (FM) =

- Independence, California; United States
- Broadcast area: Bishop
- Frequency: 92.5 MHz
- Branding: The Classic Rock Asylum

Programming
- Format: Classic rock
- Affiliations: Worldwide News Network, Westwood One

Ownership
- Owner: LLC Trust; (Benett Kessler II Trust, Benett Kessler Trustee)

History
- First air date: April 12, 1996
- Former call signs: KDAY-FM (1991–2004)
- Call sign meaning: Sierra Wave

Technical information
- Licensing authority: FCC
- Facility ID: 46683
- Class: B
- ERP: 870 watts
- HAAT: 899.0 meters (2,949.5 ft)
- Transmitter coordinates: 36°58′38″N 118°7′13″W
- Translators: 92.5 K223BF (Mammoth Mountain, CA); 96.5 K243BC (Conway Summit, CA); 96.5 K243AK (Mammoth Lakes, CA)

Links
- Public license information: Public file; LMS
- Webcast: Listen live
- Website: ksrwradio.com

KSRW (92.5 MHz, "The Classic Rock Asylum") is a radio station licensed to Independence, California, United States. It features a classic rock music format. It serves the Bishop, Ridgecrest, Mammoth Lakes and June Lake areas.

The station is currently owned by licensee Benett Kessler II Trust, which is owned by investors.

After having an adult contemporary format for many years, KSRW flipped to the alternative rock format on September 6, 2015, and then to classic rock in May 2022.

KSRW also ran KSRW-LP, channel 33, a television station licensed to Mammoth Lakes, California with local news and programming from Outside Television. KSRW-LP signed off on analog channel 33 at 6:20 am PDT on July 13, 2021. Sierra Wave Television is still on Channel 3 on Optimum (formally Suddenlink) and still produces its local news program under the name "Skippable News" and is uploaded on the Laughing Parrot Production YouTube page.

On April 28, 2025, KSRW relaunched as the "Classic Rock Asylum".
