= KMMT =

Coordinates: 37°37′42″N 119°01′47″W

- Mammoth Lakes, California; United States
- Frequency: 106.5 MHz
- Branding: KMMT

Programming
- Format: Modern rock

Ownership
- Owner: Mammoth Mountain FM Associates, Inc.
- Sister stations: KRHV

History
- First air date: 1973; 53 years ago

Technical information
- Licensing authority: FCC
- Facility ID: 39767
- Class: B1
- ERP: 360 watts
- HAAT: 723 meters
- Translators: K285CP (104.9 MHz, Mammoth Lakes) K288DL (105.5 MHz, Big Pine) K299AF (107.7 MHz, June Lake)

Links
- Public license information: Public file; LMS
- Webcast: Listen Live!
- Website: KMMT Online

KMMT (106.5 FM) is a radio station broadcasting a Modern rock format, licensed to Mammoth Lakes, California. The station can be heard in Fresno, California.
