= KRHV =

Classic rock radio station in Big Pine, California

- Big Pine, California; United States
- Frequency: 93.3 MHz
- Branding: KRHV Classic Rock

Programming
- Format: Variety–Classic rock
- Affiliations: Westwood One

Ownership
- Owner: David A. and Maryann M. Digerness
- Sister stations: KMMT

History
- First air date: 1999

Technical information
- Licensing authority: FCC
- Facility ID: 15553
- Class: B
- ERP: 890 watts
- HAAT: 885 meters (2,904 ft)
- Transmitter coordinates: 37°24′48″N 118°11′8″W

Links
- Public license information: Public file; LMS
- Webcast: Listen live
- Website: mammothfm.com/krhv

KRHV (93.3 FM) is a radio station broadcasting a variety and classic rock format. Licensed to Big Pine, California, United States, the station is currently owned by David A. and Maryann M. Digerness and features programming from Westwood One.

The station is an affiliate of the syndicated Pink Floyd program "Floydian Slip."
