= Dry Lakes Plateau =

Archaeological site in California, United States

- U.S. National Register of Historic Places
- U.S. Historic district
- Location within California Location within the United States
- Nearest city: Bodie Hills, California
- Coordinates: 38.2767°N 118.9853°W
- Area: 3,340 acres (1,350 ha)
- NRHP reference No.: 02001394 (original); 100013501 (increase)

Significant dates
- Added to NRHP: November 21, 2002
- Boundary increase: October 1, 2026

Dry Lakes Plateau is a 3,340-acre (1,350 ha) historic district including 65 archeological sites, in the Bodie Hills, California area. The district was listed on the National Register of Historic Places in 2002 for its potential to yield information in the future.

== See also ==
- Aurora Fire
