= Mount Tom (California) =

Mountain in eastern California

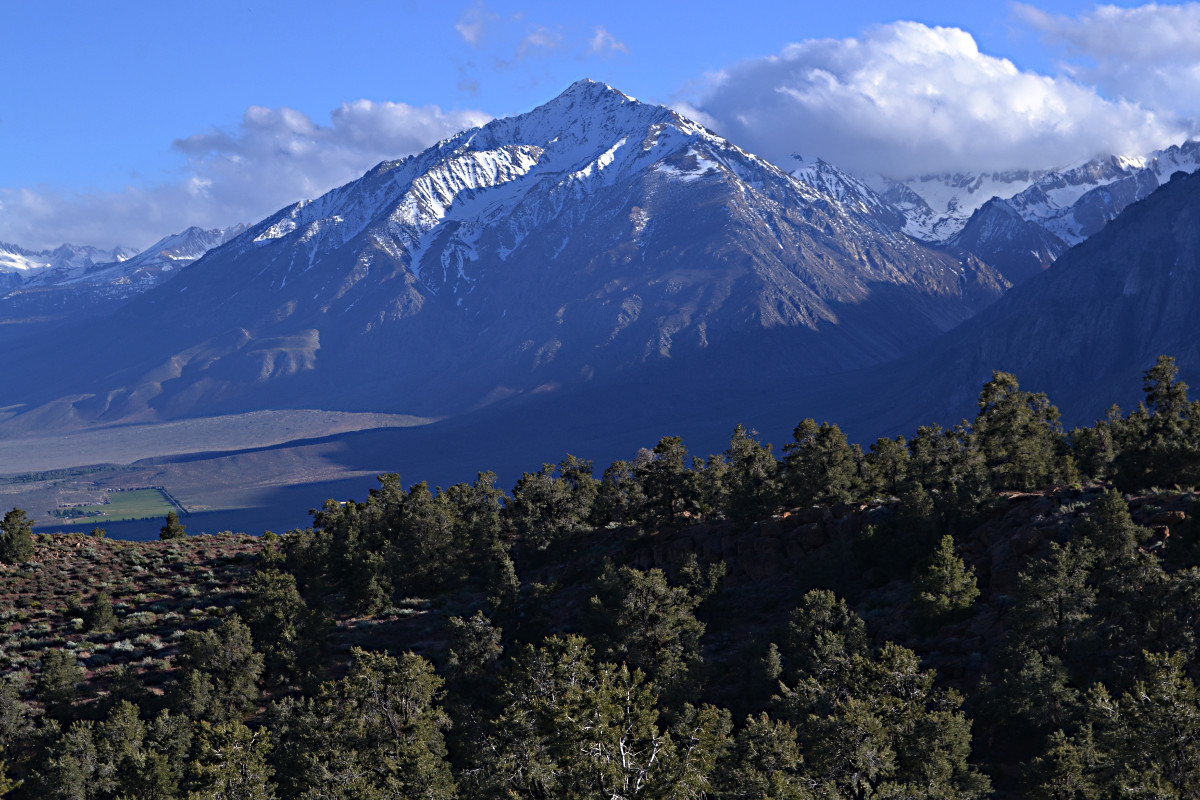
- Mount Tom from the northeast

Highest point
- Elevation: 13,658 ft (4,163 m) NAVD 88
- Prominence: 1,972 ft (601 m)
- Parent peak: Mount Humphreys
- Listing: North America highest peaks 85th; US highest major peaks 68th; California highest major peaks 12th; Sierra Peaks Section; Western States Climbers Star peak
- Coordinates: 37°20′19″N 118°39′30″W

Geography
- Location within California Location within the United States
- Location: Inyo County, California, U.S.
- Parent range: Sierra Nevada
- Topo map: USGS Mount Tom

Climbing
- First ascent: 1860s, Thomas Clark
- Easiest route: Scramble, class 2

Mount Tom is a large and prominent peak near the city of Bishop in Inyo County of eastern California. It is in the Sierra Nevada and east of the Sierra Crest. The mountain is also in the John Muir Wilderness.

Along with its neighbor to the south, Basin Mountain, it dominates the western skyline from the upper Owens Valley.

== History ==
The first name given to the mountain is Winuba, meaning "Standing Tall" in Owens Valley Paiute (Nüümü). The mountain is currently named for Thomas Clark, a resident of the pioneer town of Owensville, who is credited with being the first white settler to ascend the peak in the 1860s. Mount Tom and Mount Morgan were part of the Pine Creek mining operation which was important producer of tungsten for much of the 20th century although the scheelite ore deposits are now largely depleted and mines have closed.

== Climbing ==
The Owens Valley, at the base of Mt. Tom, is a little over 4,000 feet, and the summit of Mt. Tom is 13,658, for almost 10,000 feet of relief. The common routes up Mount Tom are not technically difficult, most are class 2–3, but they are all strenuous and long. Summiting Mount Tom is possible in a single day, but should only be attempted by those in very good physical condition.

Horton Creek Canyon is a common out and back hiking route and 14 mile out and back trail with 5,652 feet of elevation gain. The trailhead at Horton Creek Canyon is 8000 feet in elevation, it is 3.6 miles hike with about 2000 feet of elevation gain to reach Horton Lake. There campers may, with an overnight wilderness permit, choose to spend the night. From Horton Lake hikers head up the southern ridge of Mount Tom to the summit with 1,750 feet of off trail class 2 scrambling.

A second trailhead located in Pine Creek Canyon allows access to a shorter, but much steeper route than the Horton Creek trail. Beginning at the Gable Lakes trailhead, a fading mining trail can be followed in places to the Tungstar Mine, before the class 2 scramble to the summit.

There are multiple technical climbing routes on Mount Tom including:

- East Face Chimney Route, class IV, 5.9, First Ascent on August 18, 1988, by Galen Rowell and Kevin Worral.
- Golden Thread Arete, class IV, 5.9, First Ascent on September 5, 1999, by Stuart Polack and Walt Vennum. This is a 14 pitch route on the north face of Mount Tom.

== Skiing ==
Mount Tom is a popular back-country ski descent in the Spring years when there is enough snow. Elderberry canyon is the most popular ski descent. It is 7000 vertical feet of skiing and is steeper towards to summit.

On March 26, 2005, five skiers in Elderberry Canyon on Mount Tom were caught in two separate avalanches caused by the same party. One skier was injured, two skiers were buried and killed.

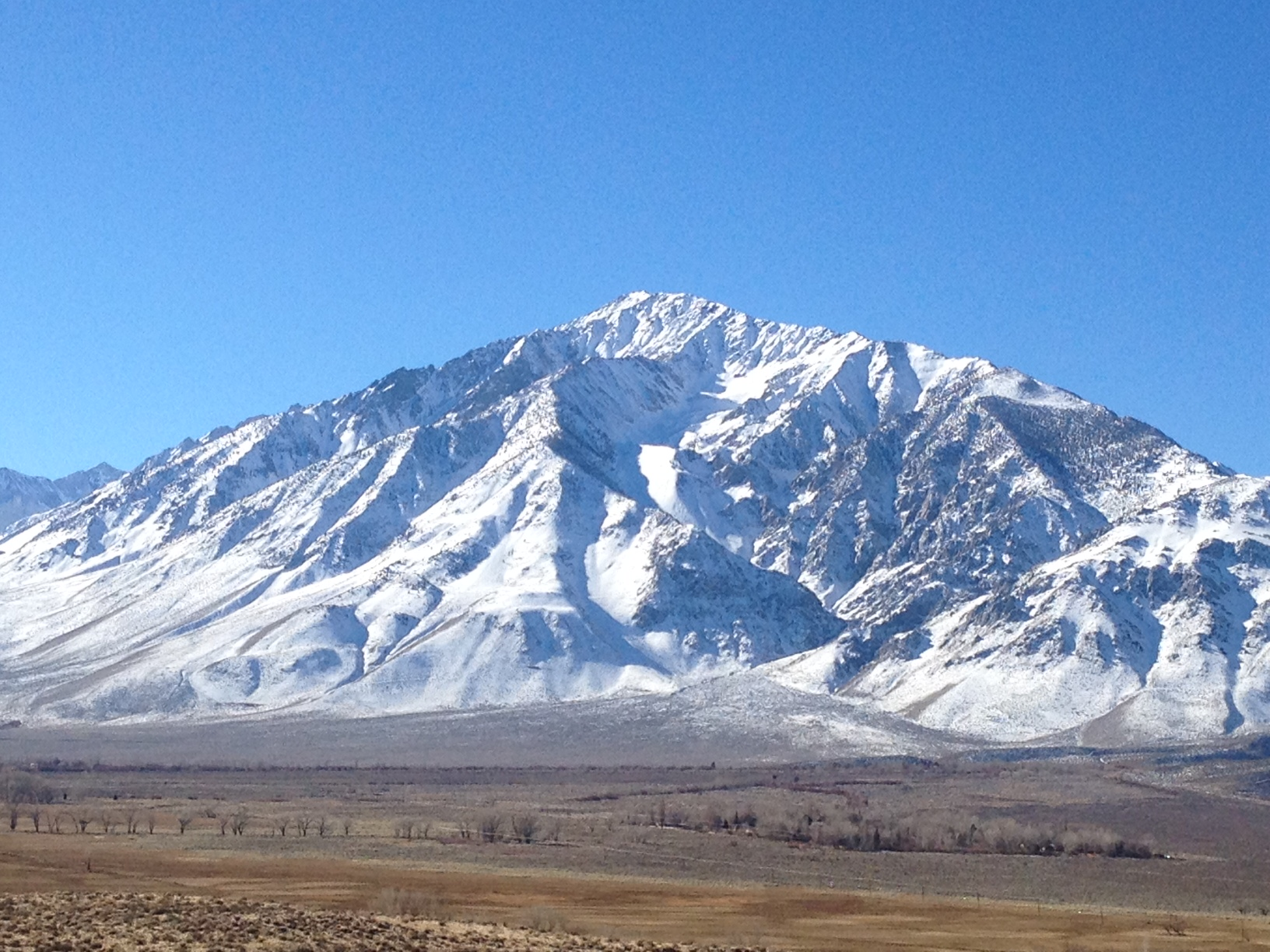
Mount Tom from the East. Elderberry Canyon is the clearly visible S-shaped canyon.

== See also ==
- List of mountain peaks of California
