= The Buttermilks =

Bouldering area in California

Buttermilk Country
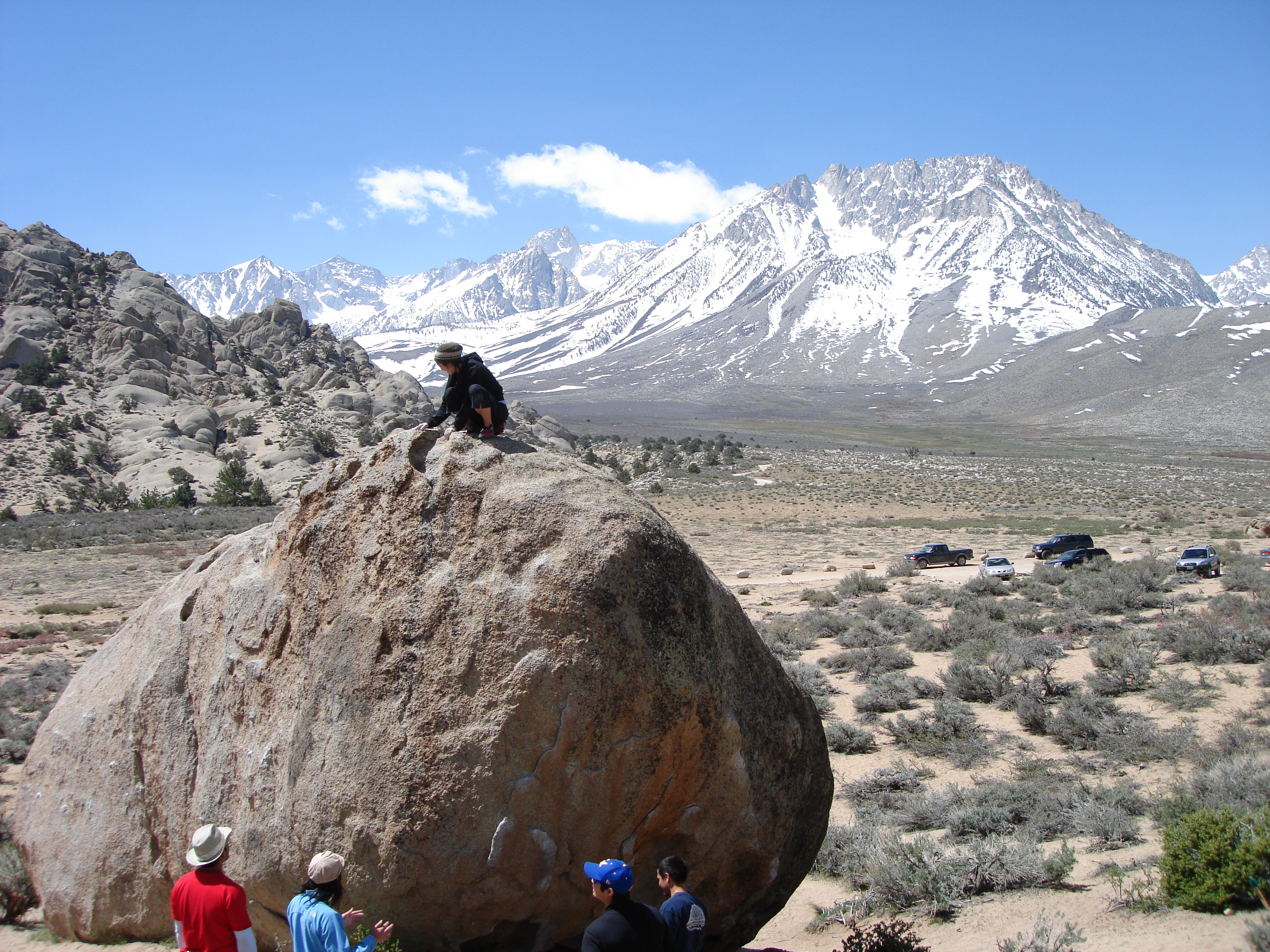
- Bouldering at the Buttermilks with Basin Mountain in the background

- Location within California
- Location: Inyo County, California, U.S.
- Nearest city: Bishop, California
- Range: Sierra Nevada foothills
- Coordinates: 37°17′40″N 118°36′36″W
- Type of climbing: Bouldering
- Technical grades: V0 - V16
- Rock type: Quartz Monzonite
- Classic climbs: Iron Man Traverse V4; Seven Spanish Angels V6; High Plains Drifter V7; Spectre V13

The Buttermilks, or Buttermilk Country, is a well-known bouldering destination near Bishop, California. It comprises the western edge of the Owens Valley, in the eastern foothills of the Sierra Nevada.

Buttermilk Country is renowned for its large "highball" boulders, made of quartz monzonite. The boulders in the Buttermilks are glacial erratics, meaning they do not match the rest of the rock found in the area because they were carried by glaciers from far away.

On January 1 2020 Miles Adamson made a first ascent of Too Tall to Fall on Grandma Peabody (V10 (7C+)).

In February 2023, Katie Lamb did the first female ascent of Spectre (V13/14 ) in the Buttermilks.

== See also ==
- Fontainebleau rock climbing, major bouldering area in France
- Happy Boulders, popular bouldering area near Bishop
