= Basin Mountain (California) =

Mountain in Sierra Nevada range, California, United States

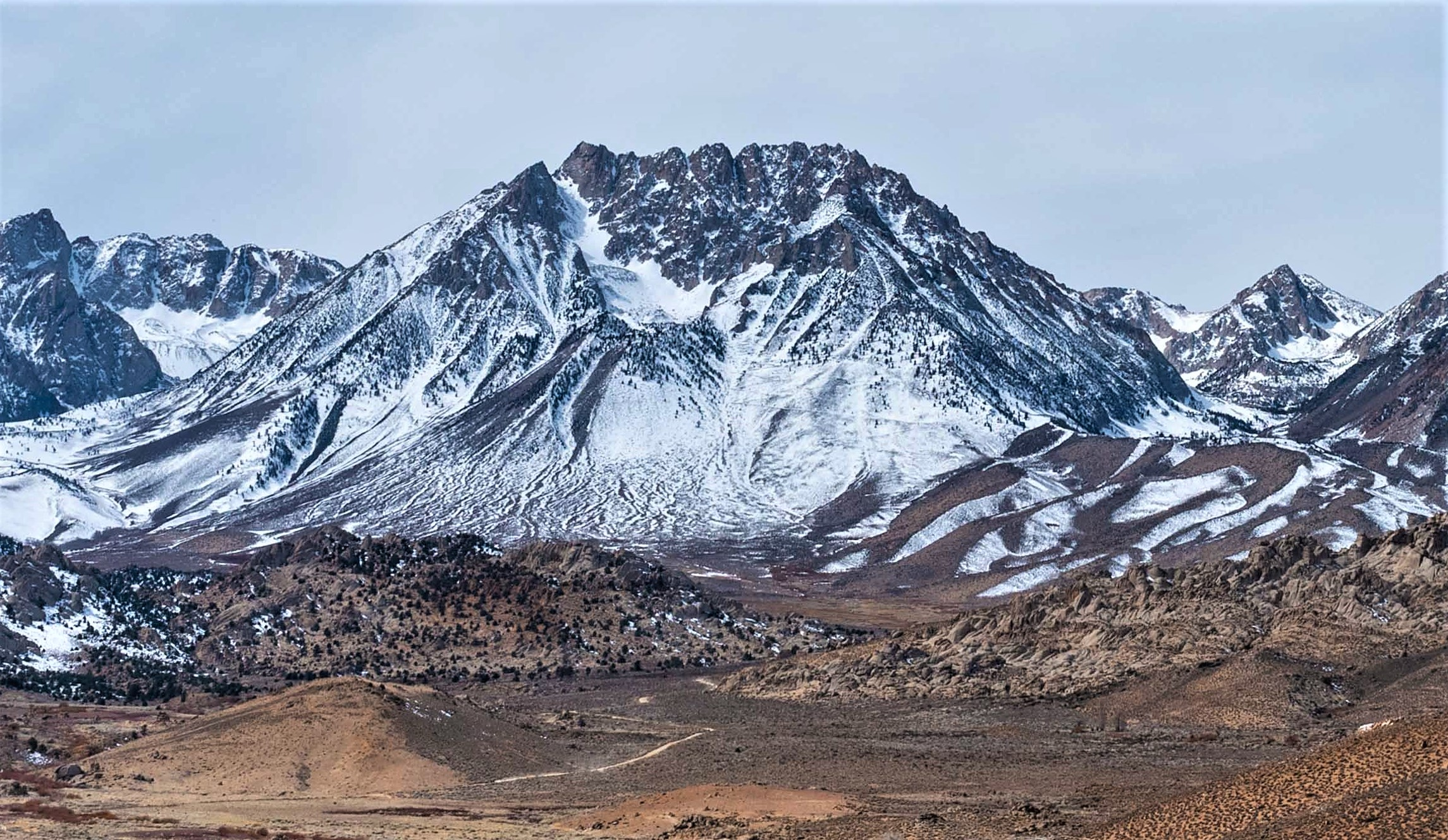
- Basin Mountain's east face in winter

Highest point
- Elevation: 13187+ ft (4020+ m) NAVD 88
- Prominence: 421 ft (128 m)
- Listing: Sierra Peaks Section
- Coordinates: 37°17′46″N 118°39′37″W

Geography
- Location within California
- Location: Inyo County California, U.S.
- Parent range: Sierra Nevada
- Topo map: USGS Mount Tom

Climbing
- First ascent: November 9, 1930, by Norman Clyde via the North Slope
- Easiest route: Simple Scramble, class 2 via the North Slope

Basin Mountain in California's eastern Sierra Nevada range is a large and visually prominent peak near the city of Bishop. Basin Mountain is not as tall as its neighboring peaks, Mount Tom and Mount Humphreys, but it dominates the view to the west from Bishop as it rises above the Buttermilks. It is a relatively easy scramble to the top. The summit is not especially notable, except for the wonderful views it offers of Mount Tom, which dominates the skyline just to the north. The night-time views of Bishop and the Owens valley are spectacular.

== See also ==
- Thirteener
