= Bishop, California =

City in California, United States

- City
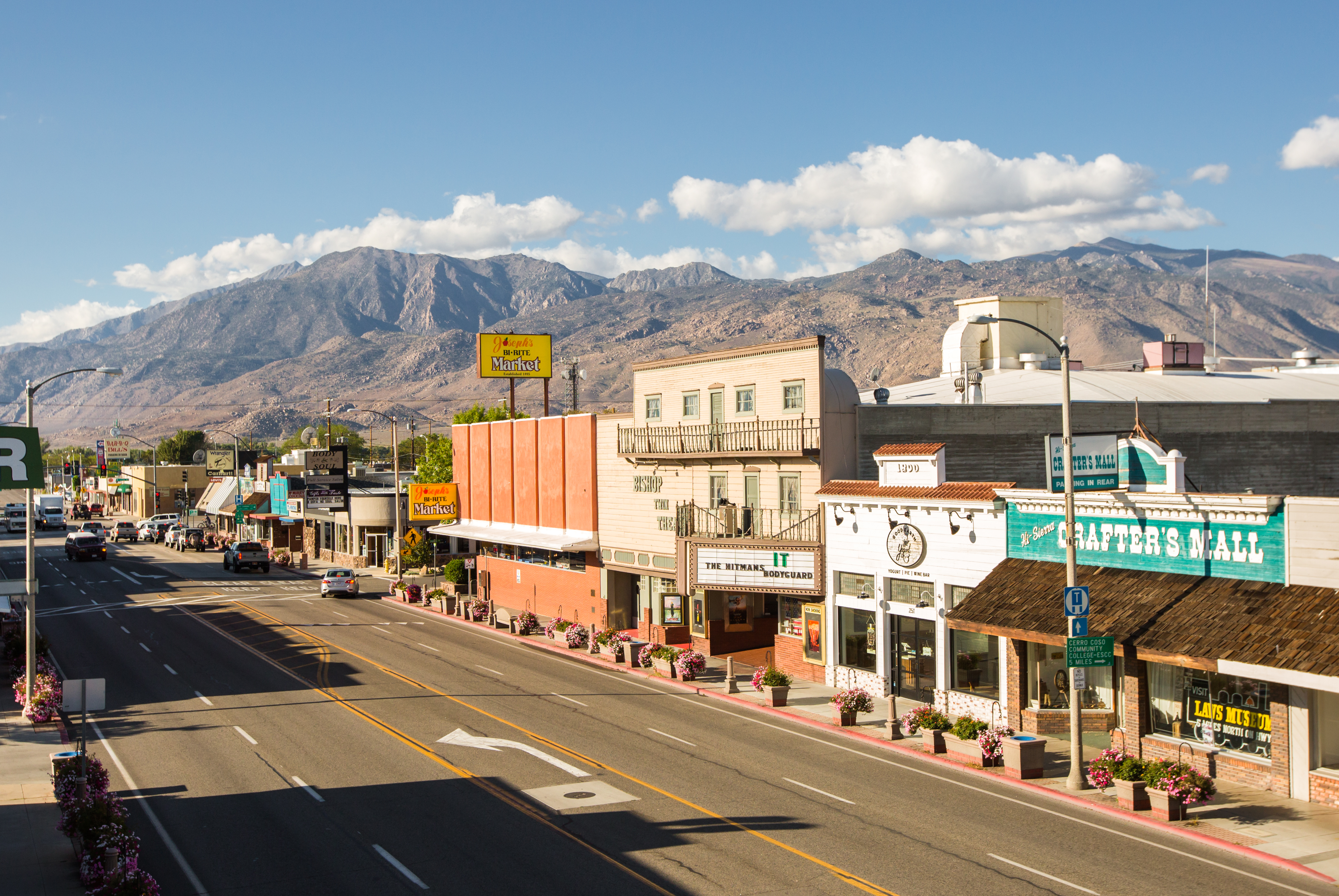
- Downtown Bishop looking south along U.S. 395

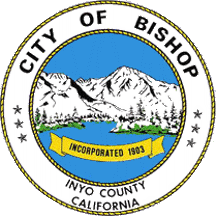
- Seal
- Interactive map of Bishop, California
- Location in California
- Coordinates: 37°22′00″N 118°23′45″W
- Country: United States
- State: California
- County: Inyo
- Incorporated: May 6, 1903
- Named for: Bishop Creek

Government
  - Mayor: Karen Kong

Area
  - City: 1.91 sq mi (4.95 km^{2})
  - Land: 1.86 sq mi (4.83 km^{2})
  - Water: 0.046 sq mi (0.12 km^{2}) 2.5%
- Elevation: 4,150 ft (1,260 m)

Population (2020)
  - City: 3,819
  - Density: 2,049.0/sq mi (791.14/km^{2})
  - Metro: 19,016
- Time zone: UTC−8 (Pacific)
  - Summer (DST): UTC−7 (PDT)
- ZIP codes: 93514, 93515
- Area codes: 442/760
- FIPS code: 06-06798
- GNIS feature IDs: 2409852
- Website: cityofbishop.ca.gov

Bishop is the only incorporated city in Inyo County, California, United States. It is located near the northern end of the Owens Valley in the Mojave Desert, at an elevation of 4,150 feet (1,260 m). The city was named after Bishop Creek, flowing out of the Sierra Nevada range; the creek was named after Samuel Addison Bishop, a settler in the Owens Valley. Bishop is a commercial and residential center, while many vacation destinations and tourist attractions in the Sierra Nevada are located nearby. The city covers approximately 1.9 square miles (4.9 km^{2}), making it the county's largest community by population and land area.

The population of the city limits was 3,819 at the 2020 census, down from 3,879 at the 2010 census. Bishop is the main hub of the Bishop Micropolitan Statistical area where the population of the built-up zone around Bishop at the time of the 2020 census was 19,016. This includes the surrounding unincorporated communities of West Bishop, Dixon Lane-Meadow Creek, the Bishop Paiute Reservation, Rocking K Ranch, Mustang Mesa, Round Valley, Bishop Creek, Aspendell, Starlite and Chalfant Valley.

A number of western films were shot in Bishop, including movies starring John Wayne, Charlton Heston, and Joel McCrea.

== History ==
=== Indigenous people ===
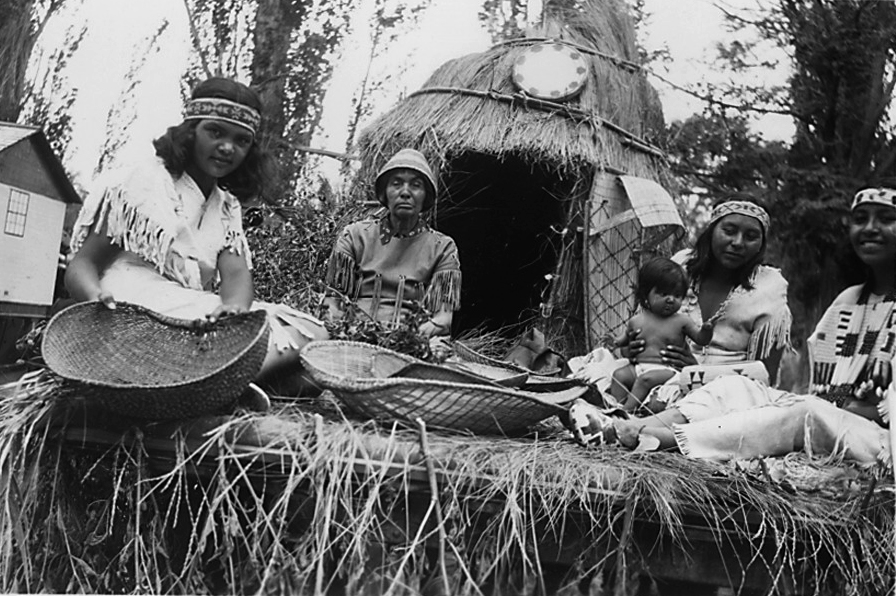
Example of Paiute Hut, re-constructed for a float in a parade in Bishop, 1940

The area around Bishop was inhabited in late prehistoric times by the Eastern Mono (also called Owens Valley Paiute). The Eastern Mono speak a dialect of the Mono language, which is also Numic but is more closely related to Northern Paiute. The Mono people were predominantly sedentary and settled in fixed settlements along rivers or springs which were fed by snowmelt from the eastern slopes of the Sierra Nevada. The Eastern Mono spent part of the year foraging across the Owens Valley. The more intensive arable farming by means of partly artificial irrigation enabled them to build up food reserves and feed larger groups. The Eastern Mono presently live in and near Bishop. In 1912, the Eastern Mono reservation was established at 67,000 acres (270 km^{2}), but in 1932, Herbert Hoover revoked the reservation and restricted the Bishop Paiute Tribe to 875 acres (3.54 km^{2}) next to the town of Bishop, in order to grant water rights to the Los Angeles Aqueduct.

=== First American settlers ===
The first American explorers in the Owens Valley of Eastern California included the mountain men Jedediah Smith in 1833 and Joseph Walker in 1834. This remote area of California had never been explored by the Spanish although it appeared as Mexican territory on early maps.

Explorer John C. Fremont was an early US Army visitor to the region. Officially sanctioned by the federal government, his 1845 mapping party to the Eastern Sierra included the scout Kit Carson, for whom the capital of Nevada, Carson City, was named. Also in the party were Ed Kern for whom Kern County, California was named and Richard Owens, for whom Owens Lake and Owens Valley were named.

The city of Bishop was established due to the need for beef in Aurora, Nevada, a mining camp eighty miles to the north. Aurora was believed to be on the California side of the border at that time and was the county seat of Mono County. In 1861 cattlemen drove herds of cattle three hundred miles from the San Joaquin Valley of California through the southern Sierra at Walker Pass, up the Owens Valley, and then through Adobe Meadows to Aurora.

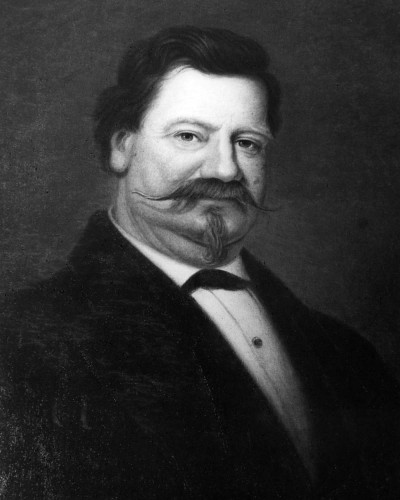
Samuel Addison Bishop in 1870

To avoid the long journey from the other side of the mountains, a few cattlemen decided to settle in the valley. Driving about 600 head of cattle and 50 horses, Samuel Addison Bishop, his wife, and several hired hands arrived in the Owens Valley on August 22, 1861, from Fort Tejon in the Tehachapi Mountains. Along with Henry Vansickle, Charles Putnam, Allen Van Fleet, and the McGee brothers, Bishop was one of the first white settlers in the valley. The town was named after Samuel Bishop.

Sheepmen soon followed the cattlemen and initially struggled due to a lack of forage for their stock in the area. Remnants of the early settlers' stone corrals and fences still exist north of Bishop along Highway 395 in Round Valley, California. Samuel Bishop set up a market to sell beef to the miners and business owners in Aurora. One of the residents of Aurora at that time was a young Samuel Clemens, who later gained fame as author Mark Twain. By 1862, a frontier settlement known as Bishop Creek was established two miles east of the San Francis Ranch. The only remnant of Samuel Bishop's ranch is a monument placed near the original site at the corner of Highway 168 West and Red Hill Road, two miles west of downtown Bishop.

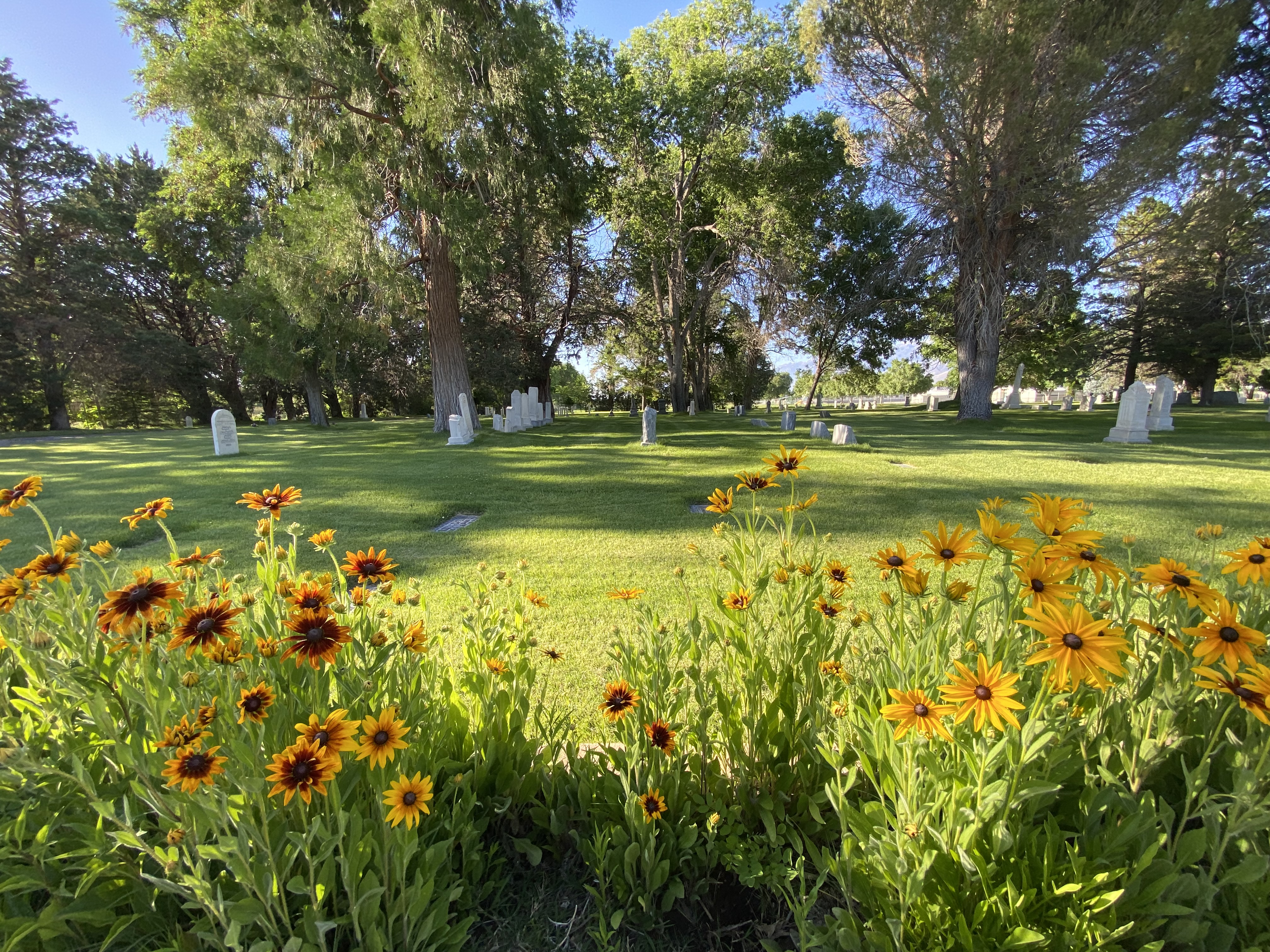
The historic cemetery on West Line St. was established in 1868.

In 1866, the County of Inyo was established from part of Tulare County. The Eastern High Sierra/Owens Valley region was the westernmost populated frontier of the U.S. at that time. In 1871, Daniel Bruhn was one of 41 wranglers herding nearly 3,000 wild Spanish mustangs from Stockton, California to Texas. Some descendants of those mustangs still roam on the California/Nevada border just north of Bishop. The first Bishop post office opened in 1889.

=== Water conflicts of the Owens Valley ===
As Los Angeles expanded during the late 19th century, it began outgrowing its water supply. Fred Eaton, mayor of Los Angeles, promoted a plan to take water from Owens Valley, where Bishop lies, to Los Angeles via an aqueduct. Between 1905 and 1907, most of the land in the Owens Valley was purchased from farmers and ranchers at bargain prices by Eaton, ostensibly for a his own use. The real goal was to send Owens Valley water south to Los Angeles. In 1907, Eaton traveled to Washington to meet with advisers of Theodore Roosevelt to convince them that the water of the Owens River would do more good flowing through faucets in Los Angeles than it would if used on Owens Valley fields and orchards. Despite a political fight with Congressman Sylvester Smith, who represented the area around Bishop, Roosevelt decided in favor of the aqueduct.

The aqueduct was built from 1907 to 1913 under the supervision of William Mullholland. The aqueduct is 223 miles (359 km) long, used no pumping stations; only gravity siphons. From the 1910s to 1930s, the Los Angeles Department of Water and Power purchased much of the valley for water rights and control. The result was a substantial change to the Owens Valley culture and environment. The economy of Bishop suffered when farmers, ranchers and land owners sold much of their property. By 1928, Los Angeles owned 90 percent of the land and subsequent water rights in Owens Valley rendering all agriculture, economic and development interests in the region effectively dead. With the diversion of water to Los Angeles, the Owens Lake and lower Owens River dried up, forcing many valley residents to leave the area. For a number of years, Owens Valley residents expressed much animosity toward the city of Los Angeles; for example, in Dry Ditches, a book of poems published in 1934 by the Parcher family of Bishop. Jack Foley, a Bishop resident and sound effects specialist, mitigated the economic loss by persuading several Los Angeles studio bosses that the town of Bishop would be ideal as a location to shoot westerns.

== Geography ==
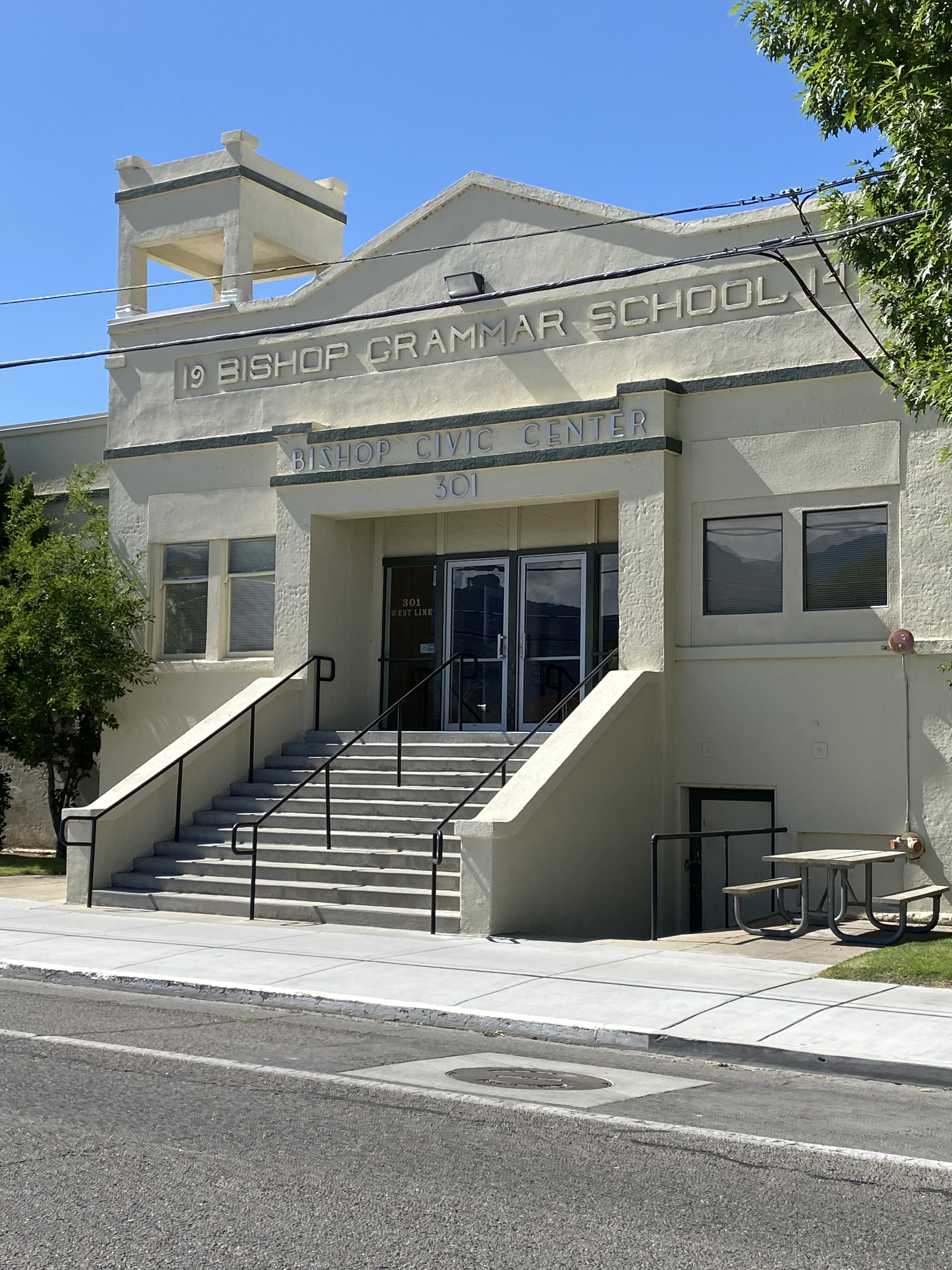
Bishop Civic Center

Bishop lies west of the Owens River at the northern end of the Owens Valley in the Mojave Desert. Bishop is a part of the southern California high desert region. The city is located on U.S. Route 395, the main north–south artery through the Owens Valley, connecting the Inland Empire to Reno, Nevada. US 395 also connects Bishop to Los Angeles via State Route 14 through Palmdale, essentially running parallel with the Los Angeles aquaduct. Bishop is the western terminus of U.S. Route 6. The Paiute-Shoshone Indians of the Bishop Community of the Bishop Colony control land just west of the town. The Los Angeles Department of Water and Power (DWP) controls much of the upstream and surrounding area.

Bishop is immediately to the east of the Sierra Nevada, and west of the White Mountains. Numerous peaks are within a short distance of Bishop, including Mount Humphreys (13,986 ft; 4,263 m) to the west, White Mountain Peak (14,242 ft; 4,341 m) to the northeast, and pyramidal Mount Tom (13,658 ft; 4,163 m) northwest of town. Basin Mountain (13,187 ft; 4,019 m) is viewed to the west from Bishop as it rises above the Buttermilks. According to the United States Census Bureau, the city has a total area of 1.9 square miles (4.9 km^{2}), over 97% of it land. Bishop is known as the "Mule Capital of the World" and a week-long festival called Bishop Mule Days has been held since 1969 during the week of Memorial Day, celebrating the contributions of pack mules to the area. The festival attracts many tourists, primarily from the Southern California area.

Bishop is well known in the rock climbing community. Near the city are numerous climbing spots that attract visitors from around the world. There are over 2,000 bouldering locations in Bishop. The two main types of rock are volcanic tuff at the Happy and Sad boulders and quartz monzonite at the Buttermilks.

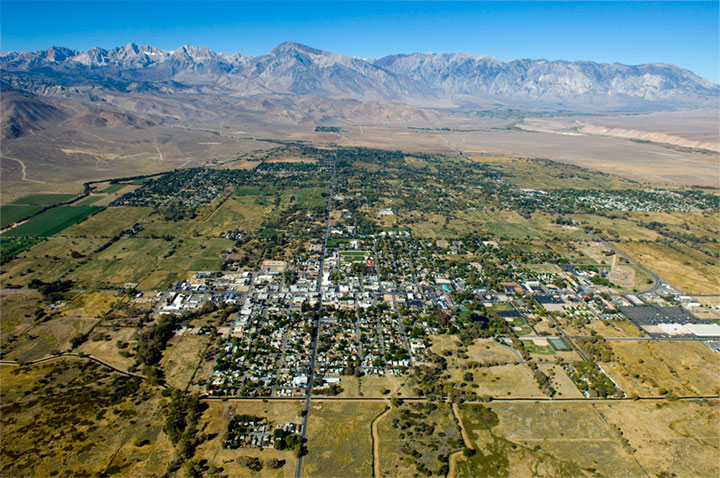
An aerial view of Bishop, looking west. Line Street, Bishop's main East-West Street, is in center left, running from the bottom of the photo into the distance

=== Notable locations ===
- Ancient Bristlecone Pine Forest
- Bishop Petroglyphs
- Bishop Area Chamber of Commerce
- Bishop Visitors Bureau
- Eastern Sierra Regional Airport
- Inyo National Forest Supervisor's Office
- Keoughs Hot Springs
- Laws Rail Museum
- Paiute Indian Reservation
- Paiute-Shoshone Cultural Center Museum

== Climate ==
Bishop, as with the rest of the Owens Valley, has a warm, arid climate with an annual average of 4.84 inches (123 mm) of precipitation, and is part of USDA Plant Hardiness Zone 7b. The wettest "rain year" was from July 1968 to June 1969 with 18.02 inches (458 mm) of precipitation and the driest from July 2006 to June 2007 with only 1.50 inches (38 mm). Measurable precipitation occurs on an average of 26 days annually. The most precipitation in one month was 8.93 inches (227 mm) in January 1969, and the most precipitation in 24 hours 4.00 inches or 102 millimeters on January 4, 2008. Snowfall averages 6.8 inches or 17 centimeters per season. The snowiest season was from July 1968 to June 1969 with 59.3 inches or 151 centimeters, which included the snowiest month, February 1969, at 31.9 inches or 81 centimeters. Contrariwise, between July 1974 and June 1975 and again between July 2023 and June 2024, only a trace of snow fell over an entire year.

There is an average of three mornings where the low drops to or below 10 °F or −12 °C, 139 mornings where the low reaches the freezing mark, 104 afternoons with maxima at or above 90 °F (32 °C), and 29 afternoons with highs at or above 100 °F (38 °C). Due to the aridity and hot high-altitude sun, there are only 34 days with maxima below 50 °F or 10 °C, and only one per year with a maximum below freezing, whilst the annual diurnal temperature variation is 36.9 °F (20.5 °C), and reaches 42 °F or 23 °C during the summer. The record high temperature of 111 °F or 44 °C occurred on July 10, 2021; the record low of −8 °F or −22 °C was recorded on December 22, 1990, and December 27, 1988. A hotter climate in recent decades has contributed to the three days of December 1990 being the last to fall to or below 0 °F or −18 °C.

Cold daytime highs and warm nights are rare, but have happened on occasion. The coldest daytime maximum measured was 19 °F (−7 °C) on January 22, 1962. Ice days are infrequent with the warmer climate of recent decades. Between 1991 and 2020 the coldest maximum temperature of the year averaged 35 °F or 2 °C with the coldest days barely remaining below freezing. The warmest night on record was 75 °F or 24 °C on August 4, 1961, while the average warmest night each year stands at 68 °F or 20 °C.

Climate data for Bishop, California (Eastern Sierra Regional Airport), 1991–2020 normals, extremes 1943–present
Month	Jan	Feb	Mar	Apr	May	Jun	Jul	Aug	Sep	Oct	Nov	Dec	Year
Record high °F (°C)	77 (25)	81 (27)	87 (31)	94 (34)	104 (40)	112 (44)	113 (45)	118 (48)	107 (42)	99 (37)	84 (29)	78 (26)	118 (48)
Mean maximum °F (°C)	67.3 (19.6)	70.7 (21.5)	77.3 (25.2)	85.7 (29.8)	94.3 (34.6)	101.8 (38.8)	105.4 (40.8)	103.3 (39.6)	97.5 (36.4)	87.3 (30.7)	76.0 (24.4)	66.8 (19.3)	106.1 (41.2)
Mean daily maximum °F (°C)	56.3 (13.5)	59.3 (15.2)	67.1 (19.5)	73.7 (23.2)	82.8 (28.2)	93.5 (34.2)	99.7 (37.6)	98.0 (36.7)	90.0 (32.2)	77.6 (25.3)	64.2 (17.9)	54.5 (12.5)	76.4 (24.7)
Mean daily minimum °F (°C)	23.5 (−4.7)	26.4 (−3.1)	31.3 (−0.4)	36.7 (2.6)	44.2 (6.8)	51.4 (10.8)	56.7 (13.7)	54.0 (12.2)	47.2 (8.4)	37.4 (3.0)	27.0 (−2.8)	22.1 (−5.5)	38.2 (3.4)
Mean minimum °F (°C)	11.0 (−11.7)	14.5 (−9.7)	18.9 (−7.3)	24.1 (−4.4)	32.4 (0.2)	39.2 (4.0)	46.7 (8.2)	44.4 (6.9)	36.8 (2.7)	25.4 (−3.7)	15.4 (−9.2)	9.7 (−12.4)	6.6 (−14.1)
Record low °F (°C)	−7 (−22)	−2 (−19)	9 (−13)	15 (−9)	25 (−4)	25 (−4)	34 (1)	34 (1)	25 (−4)	13 (−11)	5 (−15)	−8 (−22)	−8 (−22)
Average precipitation inches (mm)	1.14 (29)	0.89 (23)	0.55 (14)	0.22 (5.6)	0.23 (5.8)	0.13 (3.3)	0.18 (4.6)	0.07 (1.8)	0.11 (2.8)	0.35 (8.9)	0.31 (7.9)	0.66 (17)	4.84 (123.7)
Average snowfall inches (cm)	4.1 (10)	0.9 (2.3)	0.1 (0.25)	0 (0)	0 (0)	0 (0)	0 (0)	0 (0)	0 (0)	0 (0)	0.4 (1.0)	1.3 (3.3)	6.8 (17)
Average precipitation days (≥ 0.01 in)	3.9	4.0	2.9	1.9	1.7	1.5	1.7	1.5	1.7	1.5	2.3	3.0	27.6
Average snowy days (≥ 0.1 in)	1.3	0.9	0.2	0	0	0	0	0	0	0	0.4	0.8	3.6
Source: NOAA, WRCC

== Demographics ==
Historical population
Census	Pop.	Note	%±
1880	152		—
1890	340		123.7%
1910	1,199		—
1920	1,304		8.8%
1930	1,159		−11.1%
1940	1,490		28.6%
1950	2,891		94.0%
1960	2,875		−0.6%
1970	3,498		21.7%
1980	3,333		−4.7%
1990	3,475		4.3%
2000	3,575		2.9%
2010	3,879		8.5%
2020	3,819		−1.5%
2023 (est.)	3,742	▼	−2.0%
U.S. Decennial Census; 1860–1870 1880-1890; 1900 1910 1920; 1930 1940 1950; 1960 1970 1980; 1990 2000 2010

The demographic information here applies to residents living within the city limits of Bishop; 3,879 people are in downtown Bishop.

The "greater Bishop area," which includes unincorporated nearby neighborhoods such as West Bishop, Meadow Creek-Dixon Lane, Wilkerson Ranch, Rocking K, Mustang Mesa, Round Valley and the Bishop Paiute Tribe add an additional 15,000 residents to the greater Bishop area.

=== 2020 census ===
As of the 2020 census, Bishop had a population of 3,819. The population density was 2,048.8 inhabitants per square mile (791.0/km^{2}).

The median age was 41.0 years. 19.7% of residents were under the age of 18 and 19.5% were 65 years of age or older. For every 100 females, there were 97.7 males, and for every 100 females age 18 and over, there were 99.2 males age 18 and over.

The census reported that 96.7% of the population lived in households, 1.6% lived in non-institutionalized group quarters, and 1.7% were institutionalized. 100.0% of residents lived in urban areas, while 0.0% lived in rural areas.

There were 1,748 households, out of which 28.5% had children under the age of 18 living in them. Of all households, 31.5% were married-couple households, 8.9% were cohabiting couple households, 28.9% had a male householder with no spouse or partner present, and 30.7% had a female householder with no spouse or partner present. About 39.7% of all households were made up of individuals, and 17.9% had someone living alone who was 65 years of age or older. The average household size was 2.11. There were 904 families (51.7% of all households).

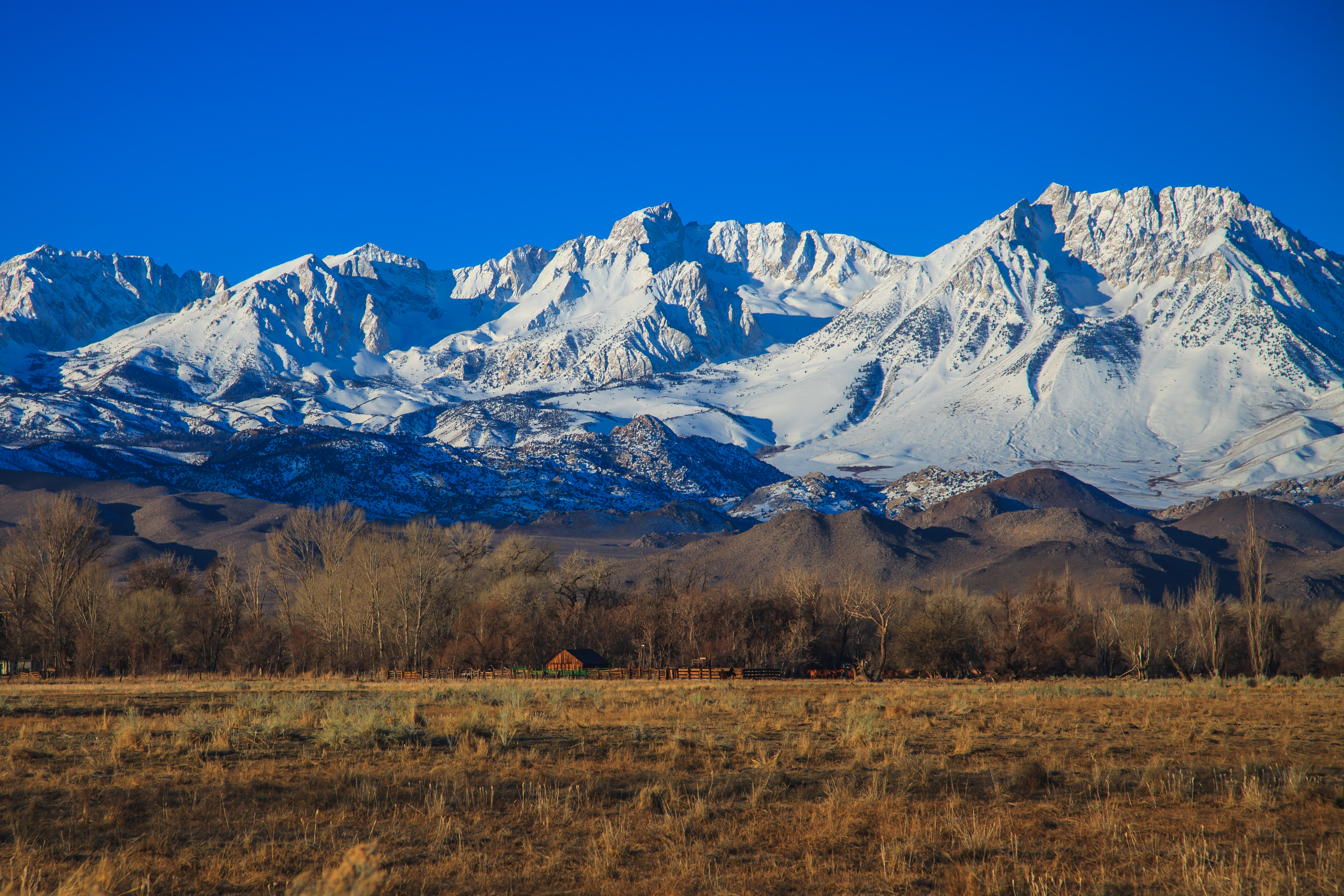
Snowy Sierra Nevada Mountains as seen from Bishop

There were 1,939 housing units at an average density of 1,040.2 units per square mile (401.6 units/km^{2}). Of all housing units, 9.9% were vacant and 90.1% were occupied. Of occupied units, 36.7% were owner-occupied and 63.3% were occupied by renters. The homeowner vacancy rate was 0.9% and the rental vacancy rate was 6.1%.

Racial composition as of the 2020 census
Race	Number	Percent
White	2,426	63.5%
Black or African American	8	0.2%
American Indian and Alaska Native	106	2.8%
Asian	92	2.4%
Native Hawaiian and Other Pacific Islander	3	0.1%
Some other race	663	17.4%
Two or more races	521	13.6%
Hispanic or Latino (of any race)	1,146	30.0%

=== Income and poverty ===
In 2023, the US Census Bureau estimated that the median household income was $82,205, and the per capita income was $54,267. About 2.9% of families and 6.0% of the population were below the poverty line.

== Politics and government ==
In the state legislature Bishop is in the 8th Assembly district, represented by Republican David Tangipa. It is also in the 4th State Senate district. Federally, Bishop is in California's 3rd congressional district, represented by Independent Kevin Kiley.

Bishop maintains its own police force, but also has a substation of the Inyo County Sheriff's Department on the outskirts of the city. The California Highway Patrol also has an office in town.

== Transportation ==
=== Highways ===
U.S. Route 395 is the four-lane divided highway serving Bishop between southern California and Reno while U.S. Route 6 provides access to Tonopah and other communities in Nevada. The junction of U.S. Routes 395 and 6 is one of only two junctions of two U.S. Routes in California, the other being the junction of U.S. Routes 101 and 199 in Crescent City, California. Section Two of State Route 168 overlaps with U.S. Route 395 here until the road reaches Big Pine.

=== Airports ===
The Eastern Sierra Regional Airport provides general aviation services in addition to seasonal scheduled passenger airline service nonstop to Los Angeles, San Francisco, and Denver operated by SkyWest Airlines flying as United Express with regional jet aircraft on behalf of United Airlines.

=== Public Transportation Services ===
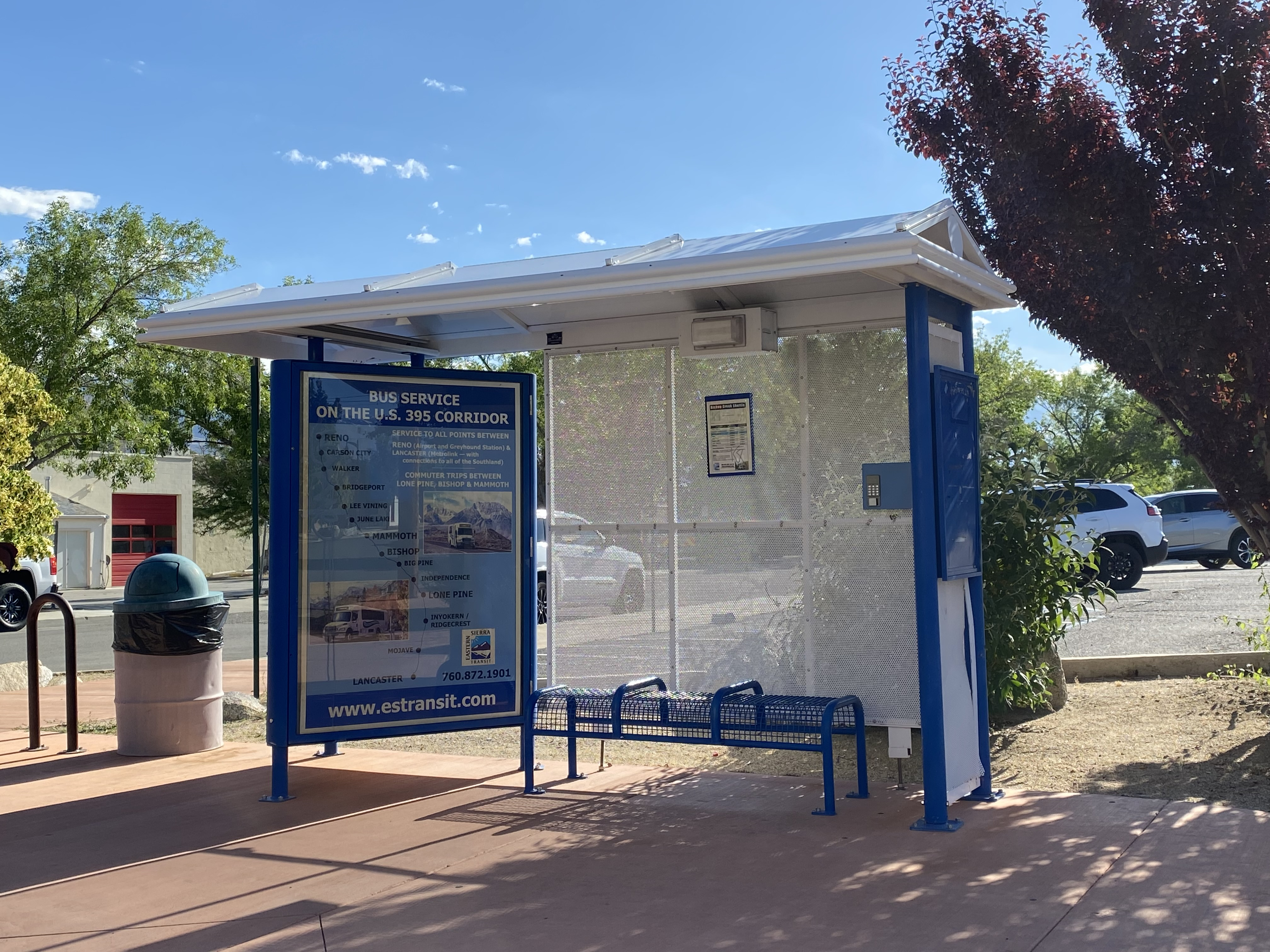
Eastern Sierra Transit bus shelter in Bishop

Eastern Sierra Transit offers bus service as far north as Reno, Nevada, and as far south as Lancaster, California.

== Education ==
The city is served by the Bishop Unified School District for grades PK-12.

The area serves the Bishop Union Elementary School District and is home to Bishop Union High School.

== In popular culture ==
A number of westerns and other films were shot in Bishop:

- Flaming Guns (1932)
- The Fourth Horseman (1932)
- Blue Steel (1934)
- Roll Along, Cowboy (1937)
- Cassidy of Bar 20 (1938)
- The Cowboy and the Lady (1938)
- Three Faces West (1940)
- Silver River (1948)
- Frenchie (1951)
- The Law and Jake Wade (1958)
- Will Penny (1967)
- Tremors (1990) The climax scene at the edge of a cliff was filmed in the hills above Bishop
- The Ranch in Homeward Bound: The Incredible Journey (1993) is mentioned to be close to Bishop, though filming took place in Oregon.
- The song "Bishop, CA" from Xiu Xiu's 2006 album The Air Force was named after Bishop.

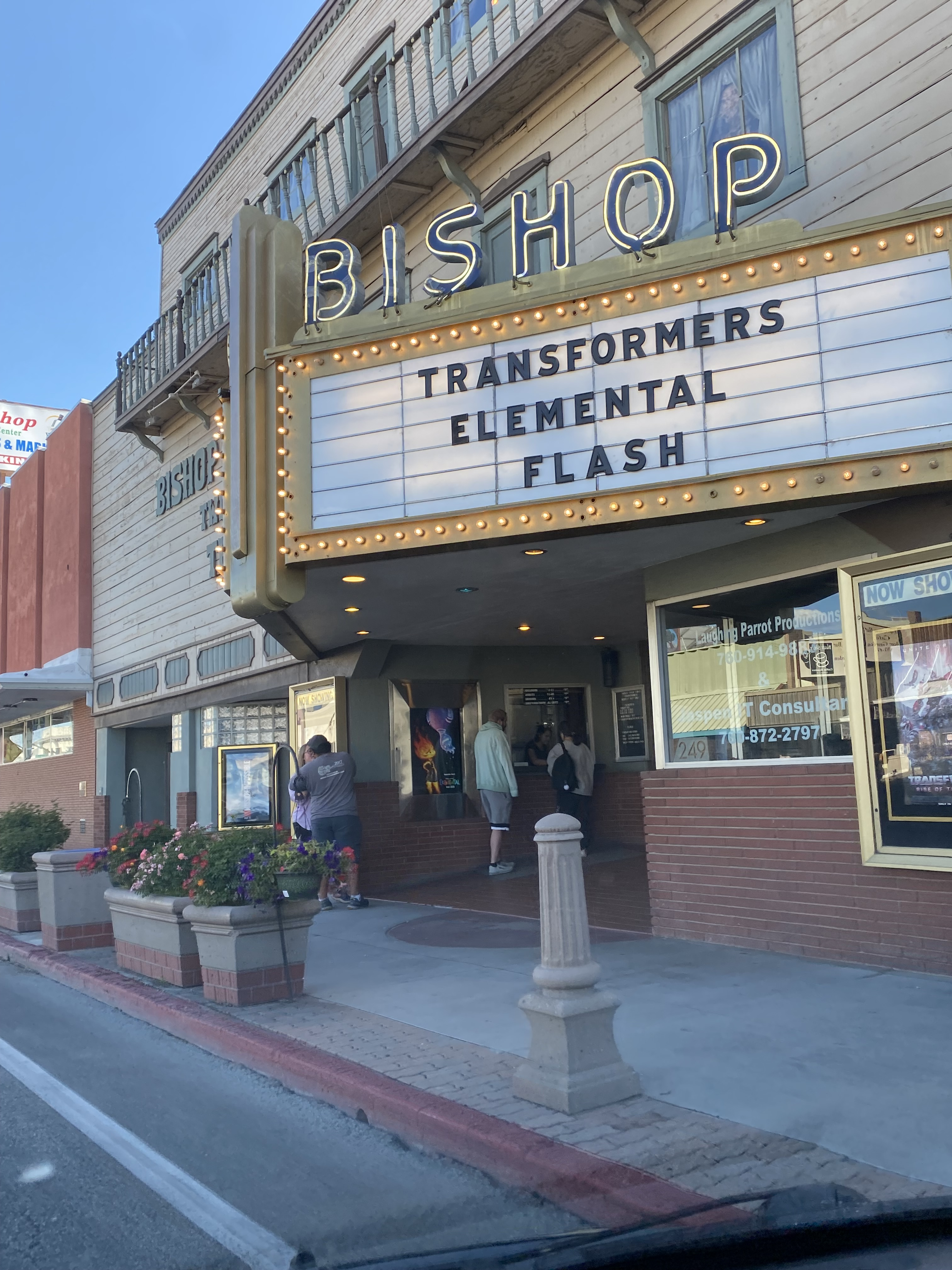
Bishop Twin Theatre on Main Street

== Notable people ==
- Horace M. Albright, the second director of the National Park Service, was born in Bishop in 1890.
- Television director and producer David Barrett also calls Bishop home, along with his brother, stuntman and NASCAR driver Stanton Barrett. They are grandsons to Dave McCoy, founder of the Mammoth Mountain Ski Area.
- Actor Robert Bray, who portrayed forest ranger Corey Stuart in CBS's Lassie from 1964 to 1968 and Simon Kane in ABC's Stagecoach West from 1960 to 1961, retired to Bishop, where he died in 1983 at the age of sixty-five.
- Artist Robert Clunie lived and painted in Bishop for decades.
- Elisha Vanslyck Cook Jr. was a character actor in dozens of films, including The Maltese Falcon, The Big Sleep, Magnum P.I., The House on Haunted Hill and Shane; Cook lived in Bishop until his death in Big Pine in 1995.
- Mountaineer Peter Croft lives in Bishop.
- Major Kern W. Dunagan, US Army Medal of Honor recipient, graduated from Bishop High School.
- Actor Trevor Donovan was born in Bishop.
- Former child actor Richard Eyer, who played Bray's son in Stagecoach West, was a teacher in Bishop, until he retired.
- Cowboy poet Curley Fletcher (1892–1954) was raised in Bishop.
- Jack Foley is the namesake for the art of adding sound effects to films, with the profession named Foley artist.
- Major League Baseball pitcher Hal Gregg lived in Bishop until his death there in 1991.
- Jill Kinmont, noted ski racer who was paralyzed in a 1955 accident, grew up in Bishop. Her life story was turned into two major Hollywood movies: The Other Side of the Mountain and its sequel The Other Side of the Mountain Part 2.
- Actor Bill Mumy spent part of his childhood and adolescence in Bishop, where his father was a cattle rancher.
- Bishop was the home of photographer and journalist Galen Rowell and his wife Barbara before their 2002 deaths at the Eastern Sierra Regional Airport.
- Tracy Smith, Olympian, world-record holder in the 3-mile, and 6-time AAU national champion, was a Bishop resident from the 1970s to the 1990s, as he coached the Bishop Union High School track team distance runners.
- Artist Alex Stenzel lives in Bishop.
- Author Claire Vaye Watkins was born in Bishop.
- Matt Williams, former Major League Baseball third baseman and former manager of the Washington Nationals, was born in Bishop.
- Hunter Kampmoyer, was born in Bishop and graduated from Bishop Union High School.

== Media ==
=== AM radio ===
- KBOV 1230 AM

=== FM radio ===
- KWTW 88.5 FM
- K208BS 89.5 FM
- KWBP 90.1 FM
- K215BQ 90.9 FM
- KDOX 91.3 FM
- K219LU 91.7 FM
- KSRW 92.5 FM
- KRHV 93.3 FM
- KAZB 94.3 FM
- KBPT 96.1 FM
- KIBS 100.7 FM
- K285CP 104.9 FM

=== Newspapers ===
- Inyo Register
- The Sheet
- The Sierra Reader
- El Sol De La Sierra

=== Television ===
- KVME-TV 20 (JTV 20.1, WEST 20.2 MeTV Toons 20.3)
- LPP T.V. Cable 3 (Formally KSRW-LP 33)
- Optimum Cable 12 (Government Channel)

=== Online ===
- Eastern Sierra Now
