= Vestana Cadue =

American politician

- Pam-o-thah-ah-quah

Kickapoo Tribe in Kansas leader

Personal details
- Born: January 31, 1901 Kickapoo Indian Reservation, Brown County, Kansas
- Died: June 22, 1974 (aged 73) Hiawatha, Kansas
- Resting place: Kickapoo cemetery, Brown County, Kansas
- Spouse: Albert Cadue (Ash-kah-puck-see) Kickapoo Tribe in Kansas (1897–1969)
- Known for: Tribal chairperson (1953–1963)

Vestana Cadue (Kickapoo name: Pam-o-thah-ah-quah) (January 31, 1901 – 22 June 1974) was the first female chairperson of the Kickapoo Tribe in Kansas. She was elected just months prior to the passage of House Concurrent Resolution 108 calling for the termination of her tribe. She led the tribal effort to successfully defeat enactment of a termination bill on the Kansas Kickapoo.

== Early life ==
Vestana Masquat (Kickapoo name: Pam-o-thah-ah-quah) was born on January 31, 1901 on the Kickapoo Reservation west of Horton, Kansas to Eugene (Kickapoo name: No-kah-waht) Masquat (July, 1876–1918) and Ella [née Herrick] Dupuis (Sac & Fox name: Wah pah qua o ke mah a quah) (October, 1869 – December, 1963) The family legend is that Vestana was a great-great-great granddaughter of Joseph Robidoux IV, founder of St. Joseph, Missouri. It was noted in her obituary that she was one of "50 descendants seeking a portion of the Robidoux estate left from the sale of the former St. Joe's "market area". It would appear that this suit concluded in 1978 with no award to the heirs of Robidoux.

She and her siblings were taken by government agents to attend the Genoa Indian Industrial School in Genoa, Nebraska. The school was run like a military regiment, with students formed into companies of captains and lieutenants. They drilled and marched in the parade grounds, woke to "Reveille," and followed U.S. Infantry Drill Regulations. Emphasis at the school was on industrial and vocational training. While reading, writing, and arithmetic were deemed essential, other education was not considered necessary for Indian children and the school only provided ten grades. To receive a high school equivalent, students had to request a transfer to Carlisle or Haskell Institute, which was not often granted by the administration or Indian agents.

== Tribal leader ==
Vestana Cadue was the first woman elected to serve as chair of the Kickapoo Council. She began her term in April, 1953, and was reelected for a second term to begin in 1955. Her third term was contested by her brother, Robert Masquat, and though he won, the election results were voided because less than 30% of eligible voters had taken part in the election. She won the re-vote and served continuously as chair until she was succeeded by her son, Kenneth Cadue, in 1961.

Within 5 months of assuming the tribal chair, Cadue was faced with the prospect of her tribe being terminated. On 1 August 1953, the US Congress passed House Concurrent Resolution 108 which called for the immediate termination of the Flathead, Klamath, Menominee, Potawatomi, and Turtle Mountain Chippewa, as well as all tribes in the states of California, New York, Florida, and Texas. Termination of a tribe meant the immediate withdrawal of all federal aid, services, and protection, as well as the end of reservations. A memo issued by the Department of the Interior on 21 January 1954 clarified that the reference to "Potawatomi" in the Resolution meant the Potawatomi, the Kickapoo Tribe in Kansas, the Sac and Fox and the Iowa tribes in Kansas. Because jurisdiction over criminal matters had already been transferred to the State of Kansas by the passage of the Kansas Act of 1940 the government targeted the four tribes in Kansas for immediate termination.

In February, 1954 joint hearings for the Kansas tribes were held by the House and Senate Subcommittees on Indian Affairs. Cadue and Tribal Council Members Oliver Kahbeah, and Ralph Simon traveled at their own expense to testify. She and tribal leaders from 12 other tribes expressed their outrage to the media as well as legislators, stating "Termination is proposed, for example, for ill-educated; helpless groups of Shoshones and Paiutes in Nevada and Utah, and for the small, depressed Kickapoo tribe in Kansas, all in need of more help, not less". They stressed that though federal aid had been inadequate, termination and elimination of needed assistance with hospitals, education and agricultural programs would be the death knell of their people. One of those other tribal leaders was Minnie Evans (Indian name: Ke-waht-no-quah Wish-Ken-O) chair of the Prairie Band of Potawatomi Nation. The strong opposition from the Kickapoo and Potawatomi tribes helped them, as well as the other Kansas tribes — the Sac & Fox and the Iowa Tribe — avoid termination.

Cadue also fought with the government over a defunct day school which the tribe wanted to utilize as a community center. The building had closed in 1951 and burned. The BIA area director at Anadarko, Oklahoma had sought to sell the property as surplus government property. Cadue wrote letters to officials in Washington, DC protesting the sale and asserting that since the school was built with funds acquired from the sale of tribal lands it was, in essence, tribal property. Glenn L. Emmons, Commissioner of Indian Affairs, instructed the agent to permit the Kickapoo tribe to use the property until Congress could pass legislation to give the day school property to the tribe.

== Personal life ==
After 30 June 1924, but prior to the 30 June 1925 Kickapoo census, Vestana married Albert Cadue (Kickapoo name: Ash-kah-puck-see) (17 July 1897 – 29 September 1969).

She and Abert had five children who were raised on the Kickapoo Reservation in Kansas: Alberta Ella (Mrs. J.C.) Brown (1927); Malinda Jean (Mrs. Emery) Mattwaoshshe (7 January 1928); Kenneth Robert Cadue (24 July 1932 – 18 December 1995); Jerald Allen Cadue (4 February 1936 – July 1986), and Albert Duane Cadue (1943–1987).

Vestana died 22 June 1974 at Hiawatha, Brown, Kansas and was buried in the Kickapoo cemetery following drum services.

== See also ==
- List of Native American politicians
- Native American women in politics
