= Native Americans in Kansas =

The U.S. state of Kansas is home to four federally recognized tribes: the Kickapoo Tribe in Kansas, the Prairie Band Potawatomi Nation, the Sac and Fox Nation of Missouri in Kansas and Nebraska, and the Iowa Tribe of Kansas and Nebraska, all of which have reservations located in northeast Kansas. The state's name is derived from the Kansa people.
