= Minnie Evans (Potawatomi leader) =

American politician

- Ke-waht-no-quah Wish-Ken-O
- Minnie Wishkeno KaKaQue circa 1915

Potawatomi leader
- In office 1933–1965

Tribal chairperson

Personal details
- Born: October 14, 1888 Mayetta, Kansas, US
- Died: October 21, 1971 (aged 83) Mayetta, Kansas, US
- Resting place: Wishkeno Cemetery, Mayetta, Kansas
- Spouses: Jesse S. Kakaque Sac & Fox (1877-1929); William F. Evans Citizen Potawatomi Nation (1884–1971)
- Mother tongue: Potawatomi

Minnie Evans (Potawatomi name: Ke-waht-no-quah Wish-Ken-O; October 14, 1888 – October 21, 1971) was a tribal chair of the Prairie Band of Potawatomi Nation who successfully defeated termination of her tribe and filed for reparations with the Indian Claims Commission during the Indian termination policy period from the 1940s to the 1960s.

== Early life ==
Ke-waht-no-quah Wish-Ken-O was born 14 October 1888 at Mayetta, Kansas to John and Mary Ann (Mnis-no-quah) Wish-ke-no and was raised with her siblings Mabel Wishkeno Negohnsoht(aka Negonsett) (Pe-yaht-wat-moquah), N-wah-gah-quah Wishkeno, female Wishkeno, Arthur Wishkeno (Sa-sa-wash-kuck or Kah-sah-wash-kuck), Non-ish-quah Wishkeno, Wab-sai Wishkeno, and William "Willie" Wishkeno (Chock-tuck) in the Mayetta community. She attended the Haskell Institute in Lawrence, Kansas, where she learned to speak English and write. At the time period, Haskell was an industrial boarding school, where students learned domestic skills and were punished if they spoke their native tongue. The allotment of the Prairie Potawatomi began in 1887 and was not completed until around 1905 due to fierce opposition by the tribe. Minnie and her siblings were all original allottees and heirs of their father's allotment, as he died during the time period when allotments were being settled.

Life on the reservation was fairly typical of a rural farming environment, as was described by John Henry Hauberg, Sr. an attorney, businessman and noted local historian from Rock Island, Illinois. Hauberg had a relationship with Jesse KaKaQue for a number of years, taking photographs and exchanging correspondence from 1914 to 1918, which is housed in the Special Collections Department at Augustana College. In 1916, he visited Minnie and Jesse at her allotment, because according to custom, men lived with the wife's family after marriage and his allotment was in Oklahoma. Hauberg described a tidy farm, with all buildings in use, a typical painted farmhouse with a sitting room, bed room, kitchen, photographs on the wall and a piano. He also noted that Minnie was raising about 200 chickens and that the farm "was exactly like any white man's farm".

As the years after World War I came to a close, the seeming prosperity which had existed, evaporated in the Great Depression. A false sense of Native American prosperity based on glowing reports and images of fancily costumed Indians, caused many to reject the dire need that developed for aid. In addition to the economic issues, Kansas was in the midst of a severe drought, known as the Dust Bowl. Temperatures topped 100 °F throughout the summer months of the mid-1930s, and in 1936 Kansas experienced the second hottest year on record. The reservation wells dried up, livestock had to be sold or given away as there was no way to hydrate them, gardens, which had been the main food source, withered. Kansas officials refused to provide welfare assistance to Native people, claiming inadequate funds, and federal programs to provide assistance to Indians were consistently delayed or blocked. To survive, the Prairie Potawatomi hunted, trapped and traded goods and services with each other. The occasional surplus skins or chicks or produce might be sold in Topeka for more ammunition, but most everything that was produced was used for survival.

Out of these troubled times, Minnie emerged as a leader of the conservative, traditional faction. She advocated maintaining their ancient customs, rejected Christianity and forced citizenship of tribal people. She was known for being outspoken and without fear, but had the respect of many who did not agree with her because of her earnest belief in the principals for which she fought.

== Tribal politics ==
By 1900 the Tribal Council had stopped regular meetings and the BIA disbanded the local agency in 1903, stopping tribal annuities in 1909. Tribal leadership was reduced to an advisory council for the Bureau of Indian Affairs though attempts were made to reinstate a traditional council. In 1917, Superintendent A. R. Snyder acknowledged that the Agency had reopened in a new location in 1913 and that headmen wished to reform a traditional council with their leader Mich-no, but Snyder discouraged them. It may be that Minnie's father served on an advisory council, but accounts that indicate he was the headman and she inherited the position from him are inaccurate. Census records confirm Snyder's statements that Shough-nas-see (Shough-nes-see) was followed by Mich-no (Mish-no). Further, Minnie was not the oldest child and Minnie' father died nearly 35 years before she came to prominence in tribal politics. Throughout the early decades of the 20th century, the Tribal Advisory Board was dominated by progressive, Christianized farmers, who validated agency decisions and were often not representative of the much larger conservative elements on the reservation. In the early part of the 1930s the conservative faction organized as a reform movement, adopted a constitution, and reorganized the Tribal Advisory Council to an elected Business Committee. Minnie first served as an appointed adviser beginning in 1933 but was elected to a lifetime position on the board of conciliators, a group composed of elder statesmen who had earned tribal respect.

When the Indian Reorganization Act was introduced in 1934, the Prairie Potawatomi rejected it. Though they desired an end of allotment and a return of some 50,000 acres of their land, they did not want an imposed self-government styled on the model of the US constitution to be forced upon them. One of the issues objected to by the Potawatomi was the rigidity of written law. Once something was written down, with a specific violation and penalty defined, it eliminated the ability for flexibility and consensus. The Potawatomi had never had a ruling body and creation of one was strongly objected to. Even worse, from the native perspective, was the oversight granted to the Secretary of the Interior or Commissioner of Indian Affairs regarding tribal governance. Bureau approval had to be obtained for all decisions regarding the tribe. Their experience with their local superintendent, who had called off-reservation meetings with progressive factions on two occasions to oust the elected conservative Business Committee, did little to inspire confidence in the New Deal Program.

During the period from the 1940s to the 1960s, in which the Indian termination policy was enforced the Potawatomi continued to struggle for their own autonomy, and their own ability to deal with their affairs. One of the first pieces of legislation enacted during this period was the Kansas Act of 1940 which transferred all jurisdiction for crimes committed on or against Indians from federal jurisdiction to the State of Kansas. It did not preclude the federal government from trying native people, but it allowed the state into an area of law in which had historically belonged only to the federal government. On January 5, 1939, when House Resolution 3048 and Senate Bill 372 were introduced, lawmakers were advised that the proposal was supported by the Indian tribes. This may not have been the case with all of the tribes as both telegrams and letters indicate that correspondence between Potawatomi Business Council Chairman Wahbnosah and Representative W. Rogers shows the Potawatomi were objecting. The correspondence is not part of the legislative record, but instead housed in the National Archives and may or may not have been brought to the attention of the rest of the Congress. However, it is significant, as one of the letters points out, that "The Business Committee of the Prairie Band Potawatomi tribe of Indians represents eleven-hundred of the sixteen-hundred Indians of Kansas," which means that the majority of native people were not in favor of passage.

=== Termination attempts ===
On 1 August 1953, the US Congress passed House Concurrent Resolution 108 which called for the immediate termination of the Flathead, Klamath, Menominee, Potawatomi, and Turtle Mountain Chippewa, as well as all tribes in the states of California, New York, Florida, and Texas. Termination of a tribe meant the immediate withdrawal of all federal aid, services, and protection, as well as the end of reservations. A memo issued by the Department of the Interior on 21 January 1954 clarified that the reference to "Potawatomi" in the Resolution meant the Prairie Band of Potawatomi Nation, the Kickapoo, the Sac and Fox and the Iowa tribes in Kansas.

Because jurisdiction over criminal matters had already been transferred to the State of Kansas by the passage of the Kansas Act of 1940 the government targeted the four tribes in Kansas for immediate termination. Evans spearheaded the battle against termination, calling meetings at her home and building strategies for consensus. They planned ways to raise funds taking up donations, selling livestock and other goods to get their leadership to Congressional hearings. Tribal members sent petitions of protest to the government and multiple delegations went to testify at congressional meetings in Washington, DC. In February 1954, tribal chair Minnie Evans, along with James Wahbnosah and John Wahwassuck, testified before a joint hearing of the house and Senate Subcommittees on Indian Affairs in Washington, DC in conjunction with the neighboring Kansas Kickapoo, enabling the Kansas tribes to escape termination.

=== Claims Commission ===
On 13 August 1946 the Indian Claims Commission Act of 1946, Pub. L. No. 79-726, ch. 959, passed. Its purpose was to settle for all time any outstanding grievances or claims the tribes might have against the U.S. for treaty breaches, unauthorized taking of land, dishonorable or unfair dealings, or inadequate compensation. Claims had to be filed within a five-year period, and most of the 370 complaints that were submitted were filed at the approach of the 5-year deadline in August, 1951. In 1946, the Potawatomi established a Tribal Council Claims Committee and Evans served as tribal chair of that committee. Ironically, the claims commission created a resurgence of "Indian identity." Up until that time, many more progressive tribal members had moved off the reservation and increasingly worked to assimilate into the larger society, but with the potential for sharing in damages, those elements began reclaiming their Potawatomi roots. On 16 September 1947, Evans was elected by a general council of the tribe as the tribal chairwoman.

Evans recommended that the Potawatomi hire Stone McClure Webb Johnson Oman firm from Topeka, Kansas to assist in preparing their claim. There were ten treaties in which the tribe felt terms had not been met, which required meticulous review of both title and evaluation of damages. Ultimately, there were 19 cases filed for treaty breaches and under/improper-valuations, and 2 cases filed for reclaiming attorney fees. Some of the claims involved only the Prairie Band and others involved multiple bands of Potawatomi people. For example, in one case, at issue was the amount paid to the Potawatomi for lands ceded west of the Mississippi in the removal first to Iowa and later to Kansas. In 1956, the Prairie Band of Potawatomi and its co-claimant the Citizen Band of Potawatomi Indians were awarded $3.2 million by the claims commission. An appeal was launched by a group of Potawatomi who had not relocated west claiming that they deserved part of the settlement. 16 July 1958 the appellate court ruled that the eastern group could not intervene, as the treaty for which damages were sought required the tribe to move west. A second case was heard in 1962 and an award entered for land ceded in northern Illinois and southwestern Wisconsin. It was appealed in 1965, and again in 1967, as the tribes felt that the government had not only unfairly valued the property at the time of the initial settlement, but in assessing the damages, for the undervaluation, the government had failed to take into consideration lead mines located on the tract. The appellate court agreed in 1968 and required the claims commission to revalue the award. In 1972, a review of standing for the land claims in northern Illinois and southwestern Wisconsin was held and the claims court ruled that the Potawatomi tribes did have standing to make the claim and referred it to the valuation phase. In 1978 5 remaining claim cases and both attorney fee cases were finally settled, but at least one case, and any appeals on those cases, were transferred to the US Court of Claims on 29 September 1978. All in all, the claims fight took nearly 32 years and was only the beginning of the turmoil that followed.

Once the awards had begun to be determined, the factionalism escalated with the progressives pushing for inclusion in tribal government. The claims committee had primarily traditionalist membership with life tenure. Because of the significance of the claims proceeding, the appointed claims committee at times took on an importance that superseded the elected council. But Minnie was tenacious. She believed that tribal unity was important and she worked hard to understand the complexities of the situation. She attended committee hearings, court sessions, and council meetings, called unofficial meetings in her home, and refused to give in on negotiations if she felt that it would jeopardize the potential benefit to the tribe. In 1961, with much support from the area BIA office, the progressives drafted a new constitution. For a brief while in the early 1960s there were two tribal business committees and two tribal rolls. Remembering the allotment period, when individuals with dubious claims were awarded land and tribal status, the conservatives believed that only members with at least 1/4 or more Prairie Band descent could be tribal members and were in favor of restricting voting rights and office holding to only those who lived on the reservation. The progressives, on the other hand, wanted all members who had received an allotment under the Dawes Act regardless of their degree of descent to be granted membership, voting rights and the right to hold office, regardless of whether they lived on the reservation.

In part, Minnie's group was spurred by the award on the first Indian Claims case, which stated that the fund was to make reparations for "descendants of the Nation as it existed in the Treaty of 1846." Congress stipulated that the appropriation could be used as authorized by the tribal governing body with the approval of the Interior Secretary. The tribal council, elected under the rules of the 1961 constitution, declared that those who should share in the judgment were those who were listed as members of the Prairie Band as of midnight 1 December 1960. The traditionalists strongly opposed this interpretation, believing instead that the only members entitled to share in the judgement were those who were identifiable as descendants of those Potawatomi who constituted the Nation in 1846. Minnie and other traditionalists filed suit in 1963 against the tribal council but the case, which went all the way to the 10th Circuit Court determined that the tribal council had the authority to specify who was to participate in the settlement. A second action filed in 1964 against the Secretary of the Interior and the Commissioner of Indian Affairs was also unsuccessful in limiting those who participated in the settlement to descendants of tribal members in 1846.

With the loss of the second suit, and the US government backing the legitimacy of the new tribal business council, Minnie was nudged out of tribal politics. When the claims that she had fought so hard to win were finally distributed, she was no longer a part of tribal affairs.

== Personal life ==
Minnie's first husband was a great-grandson of Black Hawk, a Sauk native, named Jesse S. Kakaque (Sac name: Shah-ke-toe) (1877–1929) whom she married around 1909. Jesse had previously been married to Katie Ken-ne-que (1880 – before 1903) with whom he had one daughter, Mary Maud Kakaque (March 1898 – ?) on the Sac and Fox Reservation in Oklahoma. In 1916, he was interviewed by John Henry Hauberg, Sr. at his home on the Potawatomie reservation and married to Minnie. Jesse and Minnie had divorced by 1918. On 17 January 1919, Minnie married William F. Evans, who was a member of the Citizens Band of Potawatomi from Oklahoma.

She had three children: Emory Roy Kakaque (June, 1910 - 1910–1911), Lyman Francis Evans (28 June 1920 - 1980) and Bernice Ann Laferniar Cartwright (13 November 1922 – 31 March 2007).

Minnie died 21 October 1971 near Mayetta, Kansas and was buried in the Wishkeno Cemetery.

== See also ==
- List of Native American politicians
- Native American women in politics
