= Indian termination policy =

1940s–1960s U.S. assimilation policy towards Native Americans

Indian termination describes United States policies relating to Native Americans from the mid-1940s to the mid-1960s. It was shaped by a series of laws and practices with the intent of assimilating Native Americans into European American society. Cultural assimilation of Native Americans was not new; the assumption that indigenous people should abandon their traditional lives and become what the government considered "civilized" had been the basis of policy for centuries. There was a new sense of urgency that, with or without consent, tribes must be terminated and begin to live "as Americans". To that end, Congress set about ending the special relationship between tribes and the federal government.

In practical terms, the policy ended the federal government's recognition of sovereignty of tribes, trusteeship over Indian reservations, and the exclusion of state law's applicability to Native persons. From the government's perspective, Native Americans were to become taxpaying citizens subject to state and federal taxes as well as laws from which they had previously been exempt.

From the Native standpoint, a former US Senator from Colorado Ben Nighthorse Campbell, of the Northern Cheyenne, said in opposition of assimilation and termination, in a speech delivered in Montana in 2007:

If you can't change them, absorb them until they simply disappear into the mainstream culture.... In Washington's infinite wisdom, it was decided that tribes should no longer be tribes, never mind that they had been tribes for thousands of years.

— Ben Nighthorse Campbell, Opening Keynote Address

The policy for termination of tribes collided with Native American peoples' own desires to preserve Native identity. The termination policy was changed in the 1960s and rising activism resulted in the ensuing decades of restoration of tribal governments and increased Native American self-determination.

== Process ==
Termination began with a series of laws directed at dismantling tribal sovereignty. From June 1940 until September 1950, six laws were passed that gave states criminal or limited-criminal jurisdiction over tribes and reservations within those states. In 1949, the Hoover Commission reports, recommending integration of Native peoples into mainstream society, and the 1952 House Report (HR No. 2503), investigating the Bureau of Indian Affairs, both portrayed termination as cost effective and benign in its effects.

House concurrent resolution 108 of 1953 announced the federal policy of termination and called for the immediate ending of the Federal relationship with a selected group of tribes. The resolution established that Congress would pass termination acts on a tribe-by-tribe basis. Most such acts included the cessation of federal recognition and all the federal aid that came along with that designation. Between 1953 and 1964, the government terminated recognition of more than 100 tribes and bands as sovereign dependent nations. These actions affected more than 12,000 Native Americans or 3% of the total Native American population. Approximately 2,500,000 acres (10,000 km^{2}) of trust land was removed from protected status during these years. Much was sold by individuals to non-Natives.

The termination of these tribes ended federal government guardianship of and recognition of those tribal governments and US jurisdiction of tribal lands. In addition to ending the tribal rights as sovereign nations, the policy terminated federal support of most of the health care and education programs, utility services, and police and fire departments available to Indians on reservations. Given the considerable geographic isolation of many reservations and inherent economic problems, not many tribes had the funds to continue such services after termination was implemented. The tribes initially selected for termination had been considered groups who were the most successful in the United States, in some cases, because of natural resources controlled by their reservations.

A few tribes mounted legal challenges to maintain tribal government and the trust relationship with the federal government. Through the Indian Claims Commission, tribes had the ability to file claims against the government for breaches of treaty or grievances. The five-year deadline for making a claim, August 1951, caused many tribes to file in the months preceding the end of the registration period. In some instances, pending claims cases with complex legal issues aided the tribes in preventing termination, while in others, tribes were taken advantage of again by government agents and their associates.

== History ==
=== Indiana ===
- Miami Nation of Indiana: The Indiana Miami, or Eastern Miami, signed a treaty with the United States on June 5, 1854; however, its federal recognition was terminated in 1897. In the 20th century, the Indiana-based Miami unsuccessfully sought separate federal recognition. Although they had been recognized by the U.S. in an 1854 treaty, that recognition was stripped in 1897. In 1980, the Indiana legislature recognized the Eastern Miami as a matter of state law and voted to support federal recognition, but in 1993, a federal judge ruled that the statute of limitations on appealing their status had expired. In 1996, the Miami Tribe of Oklahoma changed its constitution to permit any descendant of people on certain historical roles to join, and since then hundreds of Indiana-based Miami have become members. Today, the Oklahoma-based Miami tribe has over 7,000 enrolled members. However, many other Indiana-based Miami still consider themselves a separate group that has been unfairly denied separate federal recognition.

=== Idaho ===
- Lemhi-Shoshone Tribes was stripped of recognition in 1907.

=== Kansas Act of 1940 ===
Federal policy up until the 1940s had mainly held that the Federal Government had sole jurisdiction over Indians. The Kansas Act of 1940 was "trial" legislation granting state jurisdiction over most criminal offenses committed by or against Indians on Indian reservations. If successful, it was to be implemented elsewhere. Kansas had been exercising jurisdiction over offenses, including those listed in the Indian Major Crimes Act, and their authority to do that was called into question. To clarify the state's authority, they proposed the act to fill a perceived gap in jurisdiction. None of the four federally recognized tribes living in Kansas: Potawatomi, Kickapoo, Sac & Fox, and Iowa, had tribal courts to deal with offenses, and state jurisdiction did not extend to Indian lands. The law (Title 25 U.S. Code § 217a ch. 276, 54 Stat. 249), passed on 8 June 1940, gave Kansas courts jurisdiction to try persons for conduct that violates state law, even if the federal government is also able to try the offense under federal jurisdiction.

Almost immediately, similar statutes were passed in North Dakota, Iowa and New York, granting state jurisdiction over most offenses committed by or against Indians in Indian country.

=== Survey of Indian conditions ===
In 1943, the United States Senate commissioned a survey of Indian conditions. It indicated that living conditions on the reservations were extremely poor. The Bureau of Indian Affairs (BIA) and its bureaucracy were found to be at fault for the troubling problems due to extreme mismanagement. Congress concluded that some tribes no longer needed federal 'protection' and would be better off with more independence, rather than having them depend on and be poorly supervised by the BIA. They also thought the tribes should be assimilated to mainstream American society. Goals of termination included freeing the Indians from domination by the BIA, repealing laws that discriminated against Indians, and ending federal supervision of Indians. Senator Arthur V. Watkins of Utah, the strongest proponent of termination, equated it with the Emancipation Proclamation, which had declared the freedom of all slaves in the territory of the Confederate States of America.

In 1953, the United States House of Representatives and the Senate announced their support for the termination policy, with House Concurrent Resolution 108:

Whereas it is the policy of Congress, as rapidly as possible, to make the Indians within the territorial limits of the United States subject to the same laws and entitled to the same privileges and responsibilities as are applicable to other citizens of the United States, to end their status as wards of the United States, and to grant them all of the rights and prerogatives pertaining to American citizenship.

=== North Dakota jurisdiction on Devils Lake Indian Reservation ===
On 31 May 1946, Congress enacted An Act to confer jurisdiction on the State of North Dakota over offenses committed by or against Indians on the Devils Lake Indian Reservation, [Public Law 394] 60 Stat. 229. In language reminiscent of the Kansas Act of 1940, the law granted the State of North Dakota jurisdiction for criminal offenses occurring on lands occupied by the Spirit Lake Tribe but retained the right of the federal government for jurisdiction on offenses against federal law.

=== Indian Claims Commission Act ===
In 1945, earnest discussion began on creating an Indian Claims Commission. The idea had been circulating for years but had never gained much momentum. However, in the wake of termination, it took on new life. Policymakers saw that settling claims would become the means to speed along the process of ending "Indian-identity" and move tribe members into the broader society. Simultaneously it would eliminate the need of the government to continue serving as tribal guardian, or at the very least allow the government to reduce "appropriations for tribes in proportion to the size of their claim settlements".

On 13 August 1946 the Indian Claims Commission Act of 1946, Pub. L. No. 79-726, ch. 959, passed. Its purpose was to settle for all time any outstanding grievances or claims the tribes might have against the U.S. for treaty breaches, unauthorized taking of land, dishonorable or unfair dealings, or inadequate compensation. Claims had to be filed within a five-year period. Most of the 370 complaints that were submitted were filed at the approach of the 5-year deadline in August 1951.

The life of the commission was extended, but eventually Congress terminated it on 30 September 1978; it transferred outstanding claims to the United States Court of Federal Claims. The final case, Pueblo of San Ildefenso v. United States, was finally resolved in 2006.

=== Iowa jurisdiction on Sac and Fox Indian Reservation ===
On 30 June 1948, Congress enacted An Act to confer jurisdiction on the State of Iowa over offenses committed by or against Indians on the Sac and Fox Indian Reservation, [Public Law 846] 62 Stat. 1161. In language reminiscent of the Kansas Act of 1940, the law granted the State of Iowa jurisdiction for criminal offenses occurring on lands occupied by the Sac and Fox Tribe of the Mississippi in Iowa but retained the right of the federal government for jurisdiction on offenses against federal law.

=== New York Act of 1948 ===
On 2 July 1948 Congress enacted An Act to confer jurisdiction on the State of New York with respect to offenses committed on Indian reservations within such State, [Public Law 881] 62 Stat. 1224. The language was virtually identical to the Kansas, North Dakota and Iowa statutes, with two important differences. It covered all reservations lands within the state and prohibited the deprivation of hunting and fishing rights which may have been guaranteed to "any Indian tribe, band, or community, or members thereof". It further prohibited the state from requiring tribal members to obtain fish and game licenses.

=== California Act of 1949 ===
On 5 October 1949 Congress enacted An Act to confer jurisdiction on the State of California over the lands and residents of the Agua Caliente Indian Reservation in said State, and for other purposes, [Public Law 322] 63 Stat. 705, which stated that "on and after January 1, 1950, all lands located on the Agua Caliente Indian Reservation in the State of California, and the Indian residents thereof, shall be subject to the laws, civil and criminal, of the State of California". The law also made provisions for the tribe and the Secretary of the Interior to negotiate easements for city improvements, thus it did not terminate tribal status.

=== New York Act of 1950 ===
Within two years, Congress was reviewing a second piece of legislation with regard to New York, to grant the state civil as well as criminal jurisdiction over Indians and tribes. During congressional hearings on the law, tribes strongly opposed the passage, fearful that states would deprive them of their reservations. The State of New York disavowed any intention to break up or deprive tribes of their reservations and asserted that they "did not have the ability to do so".

On September 13, 1950, Congress enacted An Act to confer jurisdiction on the courts of the State of New York with respect to civil actions between Indians or to which Indians are parties, [Public Law 785] 64 Stat. 845, granted the courts of New York authority to settle civil disputes between Indians or Indians and others within the State. It allowed the tribes to preserve customs, prohibited taxation on reservations, and reaffirmed hunting and fishing rights. It also prohibited the state from enforcing judgments regarding any land disputes or applying any State Laws to tribal lands or claims prior to the effective date of the law 13 September 1952.

=== House Concurrent Resolution 108 ===
House Concurrent Resolution 108 of 1953 was a formal statement issued on August 1, 1953, by the United States Congress announcing the official federal policy of termination. The resolution called for the immediate termination of the Flathead, Klamath, Menominee, Potawatomi, and Turtle Mountain Chippewa, as well as all tribes in the states of California, New York, Florida, and Texas. Termination of a tribe meant the immediate withdrawal of all federal aid, services, and protection, as well as the end of reservations. Individual members of terminated tribes were to become full United States citizens and have the benefits and obligations of any other United States citizens. The resolution also called for the Interior Department to identify quickly more tribes who appeared ready for termination in the near future.

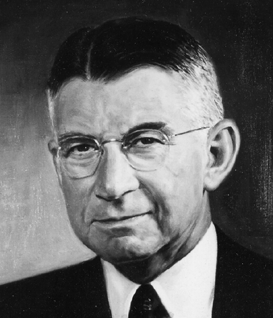
Douglas McKay, Secretary of the Interior, 1953–1956

A January 21, 1954, memo by the Department of the Interior, reviewing the effects of Resolution 108, stated that bills to terminate 66,000 Indians (1/7 of the total population) were under consideration by Congress. In addition to the above list, the memo sets forth bill provisions for the terminations of the Iroquois Confederation of Six Nations, Seneca, and the Oneida Tribe of Wisconsin (formerly of New York); the Seminole Tribe of Florida; the Alabama-Coushatta Tribe of Texas; a Kansas bill covering the Potawatomi, the Kickapoo, the Sac and Fox, and the Iowa Tribe; and 41 California Rancherias.

A memo dated January 19, 1955 for the BIA issued by the Department of the Interior indicated additional terminations were being reviewed in proposed legislation for four Indian communities of southern Minnesota, including the Lower Sioux Community in Redwood and Scott counties, the New Upper Sioux Community in Yellow Medicine County, the Prairie Island Community in Goodhue County, and about 15 individuals living on restricted tracts in Yellow Medicine County.

=== Public Law 280 ===
Public Law 280, passed in 1953, gave State governments the power to assume jurisdiction over Indian reservations, which had previously been excluded from state jurisdiction. It immediately granted the state criminal and civil jurisdiction over Indian populations in California, Nebraska, Minnesota, Oregon, and Wisconsin. Special clauses prevented this law from being invoked on the Red Lake Reservation in Minnesota and the Warm Springs Reservation in Oregon. After being admitted as a state in 1958, Alaska was added to the list of covered states where termination would be the goal. Public Law 280 also allowed any state to assume jurisdiction over Indian lands by a statute or an amendment to the state constitution. This law made both the states and Native Americans unhappy: the former because they had new responsibilities without any increase in funding to support additional staff and supplies, the latter because they were subject to new state laws.

The federal goal in implementing P.L. 280 was two-fold: 1) to fill the jurisdictional gap resulting from the Native communities' lack of independent formal judicial systems, which had resulted in a general perception of lawlessness in their communities and 2) to assimilate Native peoples and their tribes into the cultures of their neighbors by shifting the financial burden of prosecuting crimes in Indian Country to their respective states.

The main effect of Public Law 280 was to disrupt the relationship between the federal government and the Indian tribes. Previously the tribes had been regulated directly by the federal government. In Worcester v. Georgia (1832), the Supreme Court had ruled that state laws cannot be enforced on Indian land. While this preserved a kind of sovereignty and independence for tribes on reservations, in other ways they depended on a complex bureaucracy for services.

In 1955, Nevada extended state jurisdiction over public offenses "committed by or against Indians in the areas of Indian country" and determined that Indian customs and traditions which were inconsistent with any State law would not be given full force and effect in civil actions. Montana enacted legislation covering criminal offenses for the Flathead Reservation. Washington State passed a law in 1957 allowing tribes to voluntarily go under state jurisdiction and in 1963 assumed at least partial jurisdiction on all reservations within the state. In 1963, Idaho made provisions for tribes to be able to come under full jurisdiction of the State or operate with concurrent jurisdiction between Indian country and the State.

=== Indian Relocation Act of 1956 ===
As part of the Indian Termination Policy, The Indian Relocation Act of 1956, was passed. It was a federal law encouraging Native Americans, who lived on or near Indian reservations to relocate to urban areas for greater employment opportunities.

It is estimated that between the 1950s and 1980s, as many as 750,000 Native Americans migrated to the cities, some as part of the relocation program, others on their own. By the 2000 census, the urban Indian population was 64% higher than it had been in the pre-termination era of the 1940s.

== Regaining federal recognition ==
In 1968, President Lyndon B. Johnson proposed ending termination, building partnerships between tribal governments and the United States, and fostering tribal self-determination and self-development in a speech to Congress on the 'forgotten American'. Subsequent presidents followed this informal approach until 1988, when House Concurrent Resolution 108 was formally abandoned.

Of the more than one hundred tribes terminated during this era, many regained federal recognition. The tribes achieved this through long court battles, which for some tribes took decades and exhausted large amounts of money.

Some tribes, like the Choctaw and Seneca, were able to delay termination long enough to have it cancelled before implementation. Other tribes were marked for termination, like the Cold Springs, Middletown, and Montgomery Creek Rancherias of California and the Wyandotte Tribe of Oklahoma but, due to errors in process, were not successfully terminated. Some tribes such as the Oneida Nation of Wisconsin and Stockbridge-Munsee Community pursued federal litigation to halt termination. Still others, though marked for termination, fought the process and prevented laws from coming out of committee or reaching the floor for a vote.

Tribal leaders played key roles in getting their cases heard by the United States Congress, through the political process, and by the Supreme Court in suits and appeals. The tribes garnered publicity by creating resistance groups. These both publicly protested the termination policy, and fought political and court battles in Washington for restoration of tribal sovereignty or other goals.

=== Re-recognized and restored tribes ===
Tribes which were terminated but regained their status as federally recognized sovereign states include:

- Bear River Band of the Rohnerville Rancheria
- Big Sandy Rancheria of Mono Indians
- Big Valley Band of Pomo Indians
- Blue Lake Rancheria of the Wiyot, Yurok, and Hupa Indians
- Buena Vista Rancheria of Me-Wuk Indians of California
- Catawba
- Chicken Ranch Rancheria of Me-Wuk Indians of California
- Cloverdale Rancheria of Pomo Indians of California
- Confederated Tribes of Coos, Lower Umpqua and Siuslaw Indians
- Confederated Tribes of the Grand Ronde Community of Oregon
- Confederated Tribes of Siletz Indians
- Coquille Indian Tribe
- Cow Creek Band of Umpqua Tribe of Indians
- Coyote Valley Band of Pomo Indians of California
- Elk Valley Rancheria, California
- Federated Indians of Graton Rancheria, California
- Greenville Rancheria of Maidu Indians
- Guidiville Rancheria of California
- Habematolel Pomo of Upper Lake, California
- Hopland Band of Pomo Indians, California
- Klamath
- Koi Nation
- Lytton Band of Pomo Indians
- Menominee
- Me-Wuk Indian Community of the Wilton Rancheria
- Mechoopda Indian Tribe of Chico Rancheria, California
- Modoc Tribe of Oklahoma
- Mooretown Rancheria of Maidu Indians
- Northfork Rancheria of Mono Indians of California
- Ottawa Tribe of Oklahoma
- Paiute Indian Tribe of Utah
- Paskenta Band of Nomlaki Indians of California
- Peoria Tribe of Indians of Oklahoma
- Picayune Rancheria of Chukchansi Indians of California
- Pinoleville Pomo Nation
- Ponca Tribe of Nebraska
- Potter Valley Tribe, California
- Quartz Valley Indian Community of the Quartz Valley Reservation of California
- Redding Rancheria, California
- Redwood Valley or Little River Band of Pomo Indians of the Redwood Valley Rancheria California
- Robinson Rancheria Band of Pomo Indians
- Scotts Valley Band of Pomo Indians
- Smith River Rancheria, California
- Table Mountain Rancheria of California
- United Auburn Indian Community
- Wilton Rancheria, California
- Wiyot Tribe, California
- Wyandotte Tribe of Oklahoma
- Ysleta del Sur Pueblo

=== Native American communities status terminated in 1960–1970s and not restored ===
| State | Reservation | Date of termination | Notes |
|---|---|---|---|
| California | Alexander Valley Rancheria | August 1, 1961 | The N.D. Cal. argued that statute of limitations was exceeded. |
| California | Cache Creek Rancheria | April 11, 1961 | |
| California | El Dolorado Rancheria | July 16, 1966 | |
| California | Indian Ranch Rancheria | September 22, 1964 | |
| California | Mark West Rancheria | April 11, 1961 | |
| California | Mission Creek Reservation | July 14, 1970 | |
| California | Nevada City Rancheria | September 22, 1961 | |
| California | Ruffeys Rancheria | April 11, 1961 | In 2017, Doug LaMalfa introduced the Ruffey Rancheria Restoration Act. |
| California | Strawberry Valley Rancheria | April 11, 1961 | |

== Repudiation ==
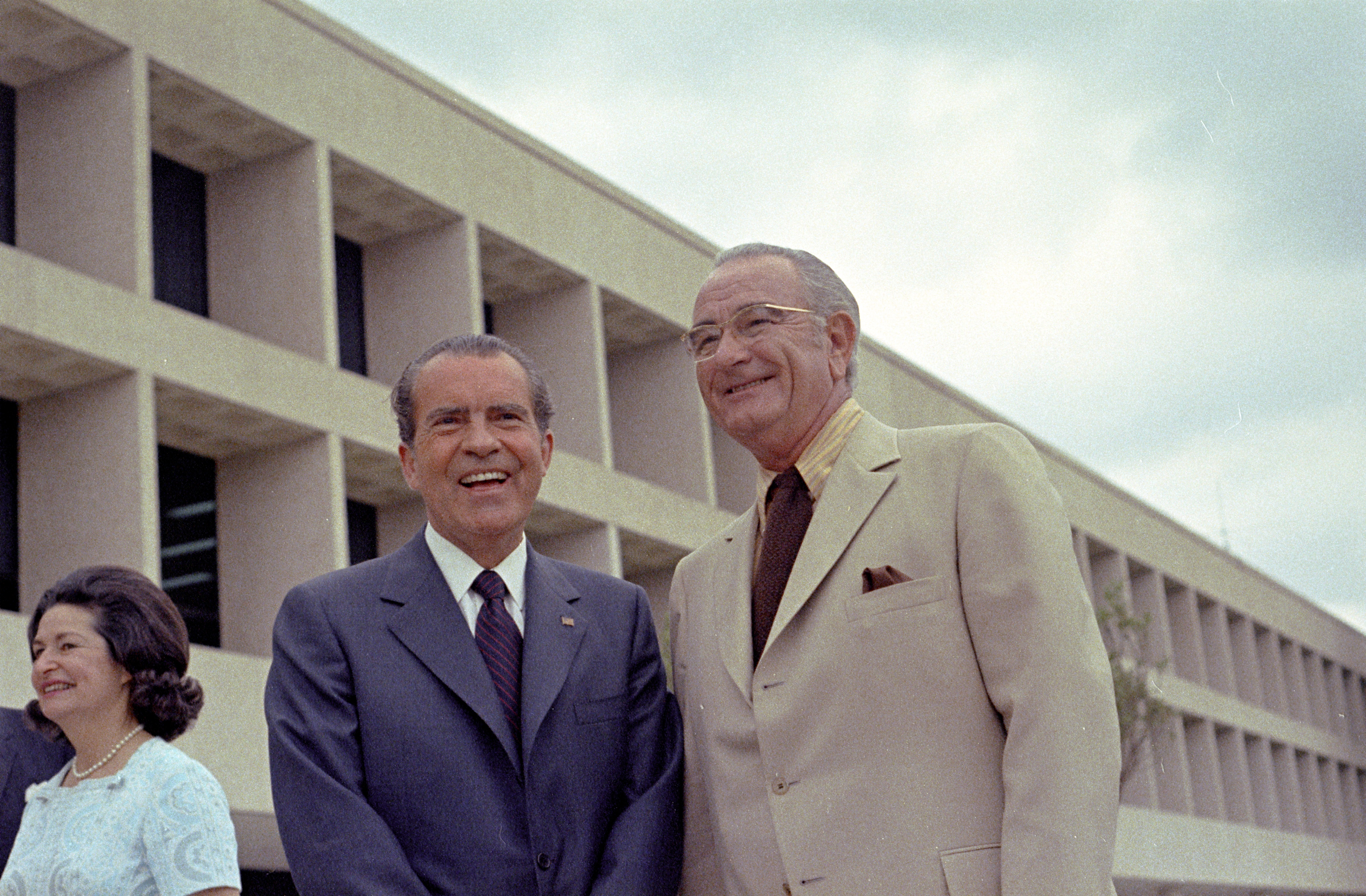
Presidents Lyndon B. Johnson and Richard Nixon favored self-determination instead of termination.

By the early 1960s, some federal leaders began opposing the implementation of any more termination measures, although the administration of President John F. Kennedy did oversee some of the last terminations. The last two terminations occurred in the 1960s, those of the Ponca Tribe of Nebraska, legally began in 1962—after Kennedy signed the order, at the urging of Secretary of the Interior Stewart Udall—and culminated in 1966; and that of the Tiwa Indians of Ysleta, Texas which transferred federal authority to the State of Texas in 1968. (The Ponca status was restored in 1990 and the Tiwa status was restored in 1987.) Presidents Lyndon B. Johnson and Richard Nixon changed federal policy, encouraging Indian self-determination instead of termination.

Forced termination is wrong, in my judgment, for a number of reasons. First, the premises on which it rests are wrong. ... The second reason for rejecting forced termination is that the practical results have been clearly harmful in the few instances in which termination actually has been tried. ... The third argument I would make against forced termination concerns the effect it has had upon the overwhelming majority of tribes which still enjoy a special relationship with the Federal government. ... The recommendations of this administration represent an historic step forward in Indian policy. We are proposing to break sharply with past approaches to Indian problems.

— President Richard Nixon, Special Message on Indian Affairs, July 8, 1970.

Some tribes resisted termination by filing civil lawsuits. The litigation lasted until 1980, when the issue made its way to the U.S. Supreme Court. The 1974 Boldt Decision was upheld by the Supreme Court in 1980, recognizing that tribes retained treaty rights for fishing and hunting, including the right to conduct such activities off the reservation and without state regulation.

Activism in the 1960s led to the founding of several Native American rights organizations, such as the American Indian Movement (AIM), and other organizations that helped protect the rights of Indians and their land. In 1975, Congress implicitly rejected the termination policy by passing the Indian Self-Determination and Education Assistance Act, which increased tribal control over reservations and helped with funding to build schools closer to reservations. On January 24, 1983, President Ronald Reagan issued an American Indian policy statement that supported explicit repudiation of the termination policy.

== Tribes which evaded termination ==
Termination, although often accompanied with pressure and coercion, was considered "voluntary" and required tribal consent. Some of the tribes in this category may have had a formal termination agreement approved, but they were successful at warding off termination until repudiation, or terms of their agreement were unmet. Other tribes in this category were approved for termination, but were successful in testifying before Congress that they should not be terminated.

=== Iroquois Confederation of the Six Nations ===
Beginning in 1953, a Federal task force began meeting with the tribes of the Six Nations. Despite tribal objections, legislation was introduced into Congress for termination. The proposed legislation involved more than 11,000 Indians of the Iroquois Confederation and was divided into two separate bills. One bill dealt with the Mohawk, Oneida, Onondaga, Cayuga and Tuscarora tribes and the other dealt with the Seneca (see § Seneca Nation).

The arguments the Six Nations made in their hearings with committees were that their treaties showed that the United States recognized that their lands belonged to the Six Nations, not the United States and that "termination contradicted any reasonable interpretation that their lands would not be claimed or their nations disturbed" by the federal government. The bill for the Iroquois Confederation died in committee without further serious consideration.

=== "Emigrant Indians" of New York ===
A January 21, 1954 memo by the Department of the Interior advised that a bill for termination is to be prepared including "about 3,600 members of the Oneida Tribe residing in Wisconsin. These Indians have no land in Federal trusteeship and are not receiving any Federal services in such fields as health or education." Clarification of who these tribes were was found in a Department of the Interior memo entitled Indian Claims Commission Awards Over $38.5 Million to Indian Tribes in 1964, which states that the Emigrant Indians of New York are "now known as the Oneidas, Stockbridge-Munsee, and Brotherton Indians of Wisconsin".

In an effort to fight termination and force the government into recognizing their outstanding land claims from New York, the three tribes began filing litigation in the 1950s. As a result of a claim filed with the Indian Claims Commission, the group was awarded a settlement of $1,313,472.65 on August 11, 1964. To distribute the funds, Congress passed Public Law 90-93 81 Stat. 229 Emigrant New York Indians of Wisconsin Judgment Act and prepared separate rolls of persons in each of the three groups to determine which tribal members had at least one-quarter "Emigrant New York Indian blood". It further directed tribal governing bodies of the Oneidas and Stockbridge-Munsee to apply to the Secretary of the Interior for approval of fund distributions, thereby ending termination efforts for these tribes. With regard to the Brothertown Indians, however, though the law did not specifically state they were terminated, it authorized all payments to be made directly to each enrollee with special provisions for minors to be handled by the secretary. The payments were not subject to state or federal taxes.

When guidelines were established in 1978 to regain federal recognition, the Brothertown Indians submitted a petition. It was rejected because they had lost federal recognition through congressional legislation granting them citizenship. The Bureau of Indian Affairs acknowledged in 1993 that the federal government had recognized them as a sovereign tribe in treaties for 1831, 1832 and in the "1839 act which granted them citizenship and gave the tribe land in Wisconsin". Based on these findings the tribe petitioned the Department of the Interior again. In 2012 the department, in the final determination on the Brothertown petition, determined that the tribal status of the group was terminated by the 1839 act granting citizenship. The acting assistant secretary noted that only Congress could restore the tribal status. In an ongoing effort to regain recognition, the tribe asked the Town Board of Brothertown, Wisconsin for support. In a vote held on 27 December 2013, the town refused to endorse a plan to seek Congressional approval.

=== Confederated Salish and Kootenai Nation ===
In 1954 at Congressional hearings, the Flathead Tribes were able to resist the government's plans to terminate their tribe. An opinion issued April 8, 1980 in the US District court for the State of Montana confirmed that the Flathead Reservation held in trust by the US Government had not been diminished nor terminated since enactment of The Flathead Act of April 23, 1904. It further clarified that Congress's intent to terminate must be clear and cannot be inferred, stating "A congressional determination to terminate must be expressed on the face of the Act or be clear from the surrounding circumstances and legislative history."

=== Kansas tribes ===
Because jurisdiction over criminal matters had already been transferred to the State of Kansas by the passage of the Kansas Act of 1940, the government targeted the four tribes in Kansas for immediate termination. In February 1954 joint hearings for the Kansas tribes were held by the House and Senate Subcommittees on Indian Affairs.

The Prairie Band of Potawatomi Nation tribal leader, Minnie Evans (Indian name: Ke-waht-no-quah Wish-Ken-O), led the effort to stop termination. Tribal members sent petitions of protest to the government and multiple delegations went to testify at congressional meetings in Washington, DC. Tribal Council members Vestana Cadue, Oliver Kahbeah, and Ralph Simon of the Kickapoo Tribe in Kansas traveled at their own expense to testify as well. The strong opposition from the Potawatomi and Kickapoo tribes helped them, as well as the Sac & Fox and the Iowa Tribe, avoid termination.

=== Chippewa Indians of the Turtle Mountain Reservation ===
Though termination legislation was introduced (Legislation 4. S. 2748, H.R. 7316. 83rd Congress. Termination of Federal Supervision over Turtle Mountain Band of Chippewa Indians), the law was not implemented. In 1954, at the Congressional hearings for the Turtle Mountain Band of Chippewa Indians, tribal Chairman Patrick Gourneau and a delegation spoke in Washington, DC. They testified that the group was not financially prepared, had high unemployment and poverty, suffered from low education levels, and termination would be devastating to the tribe. Based on their testimony, the Chippewa were dropped from the tribes to be terminated.

=== Minnesota Sioux Communities ===
Discussions between the BIA and the Indians from the Lower Sioux Community in Redwood and Scott counties, the New Upper Sioux Community in Yellow Medicine County, the Prairie Island Community in Goodhue County and some scattered individuals living on restricted tracts in Yellow Medicine County began in 1953 and continued throughout 1954. Though the Prairie Island and Lower Sioux communities drafted agreements with individual land ownership, the Upper Sioux strongly opposed fee simple title to tribal lands.

On January 26, 1955, Senator Edward Thye introduced into Congress a bill (S704) to provide for termination of the tribes. Opposition, not only of the Dakota, but of other citizens who realized their state expenses might increase, were made to the committee reviewing the bill. The Minnesota Governor's Commission on Human Rights also opposed the legislation, indicating that it would "not adequately protect the interests of the Indians". The bill died in committee, never reaching the Senate floor.

=== Seminole Tribe of Florida ===
Being proposed for termination galvanized the Seminole Tribe of Florida. On 9 October 1953, an emergency meeting was called at the agency headquarters on the Dania Reservation. There were two issues to be considered: 1) convincing the government that the tribe was not ready to take over management of its own affairs and 2) convincing the government that not all Native people living in Florida were Seminole. On March 1–2, 1954, designated tribal members testified at a Joint Hearing before the Subcommittees of the Committees on Interior and Insular Affairs of the 83rd Congress. Additional hearings were held 6–7 April 1955, requesting the continuance for the next 25 years of government supervision and separation of the Seminoles from the Miccosukees and Traditionals. By March 26, 1957, a committee had been formed to draft a constitution and corporate charter. The constitution and bylaws were accepted by tribal vote on August 21, 1957 and ratified by Congress later that same year. The Miccosukees formed their own government, receiving state recognition in 1957 and federal recognition as the Miccosukee Tribe of Indians of Florida in 1962. Some Traditionals refused to affiliate with either tribe, not wanting relations with the federal government.

=== Wyandotte Tribe of Oklahoma ===
On August 1, 1956, the US Congress passed Public Law ch. 843, 70 Stat. 893 to terminate the Wyandotte Tribe of Oklahoma. Three years were allotted for completion of termination and one of the stipulations required that a parcel of land in Kansas City, Kansas, reserved as the Huron Cemetery which had been awarded to the Wyandottes by treaty on January 31, 1855, was to be sold by the United States. Litigation was filed by a group of Absentee Wyandots against the United States and the City of Kansas City, Kansas which resulted in an inability of the US to fulfill the terms of the termination statute and ultimately kept the Wyandotte Tribe from being terminated. The Bureau of Land Management records confirm that the Federal Register never published the termination of the Wyandotte lands and thus they were never officially terminated.

To clarify the uncertainty, since an actual act had been passed, when Congress restored the other Oklahoma Tribes, it included the Wyandotte in the repeal. On May 15, 1978, in a single Act, entitled Public Law 95-281, the termination laws were repealed, and the three tribes were reinstated with all rights and privileges they had prior to termination.

=== California Rancherias ===
41 Rancherias in California were approved for termination under the original terms of the 1958 California Rancheria Termination Act, Public Law 85-671 and another 7 Rancherias were targeted in the 1964 amendment to the Act. For five of the Rancherias terminations were not completed by the US government:

California tribes which avoided termination
| | Rancheria or reservation | Tribal entity | Date of termination | Date of reinstatement | Date of land restoration | Details |
|---|---|---|---|---|---|---|
| 1. | Cold Springs Rancheria | Cold Springs Rancheria of Mono Indians of California | —N/a | —N/a | —N/a | The ACCIP Termination Report (September 1997) states that the Cold Springs Rancheria was never terminated. |
| 2. | Middletown Rancheria | Middletown Rancheria of Pomo Indians of California | —N/a | —N/a | —N/a | The ACCIP Termination Report (September 1997) states that the Middletown Rancheria was never terminated. |
| 3. | Montgomery Creek Rancheria | Pit River Tribe, California | —N/a | —N/a | —N/a | The ACCIP Termination Report (September 1997) states that the Montgomery Creek Rancheria was one of the land bases of the Pit River Tribe and was never terminated. |
| 4. | Likely Rancheria | Pit River Tribe, California | —N/a | —N/a | —N/a | The ACCIP Termination Report (September 1997) indicates that this rancheria was sold; however, according to the April 2014 List of Federally Recognized Tribes the Pit River Tribe includes the former rancherias of XL Ranch, Big Bend, Likely, Lookout, Montgomery Creek and Roaring Creek Rancherias. |
| 5. | Lookout Rancheria | Pit River Tribe, California | —N/a | —N/a | —N/a | The ACCIP Termination Report (September 1997) indicates that this rancheria was sold; however, according to the April 2014 List of Federally Recognized Tribes the Pit River Tribe includes the former rancherias of: XL Ranch, Big Bend, Likely, Lookout, Montgomery Creek and Roaring Creek Rancherias. |

=== Choctaw Nation of Oklahoma ===
After eleven years as Choctaw chief, Harry J. W. Belvin persuaded Representative Carl Albert of Oklahoma to introduce federal legislation to begin terminating the Choctaw tribe, as a means to circumvent BIA intrusion into tribal funds and government. On April 23, 1959, the BIA confirmed that H.R. 2722 had been submitted to Congress at the request of the tribe, and would sell all remaining tribal assets, but would not effect any individual Choctaw earnings. It also provided for retention of half of all mineral rights which could be managed by a tribal corporation.

On August 25, 1959, Congress passed a bill to terminate the tribe, which was later called Belvin's law as he was the main advocate behind it. In actuality, the provisions of the bill were intended to be a final disposition of all trust obligations and a final "dissolution of the tribal governments". The original Act was to have expired in 1962, but was amended twice to allow more time to sell the tribal assets. As time wore on, Belvin realized that the bill severed the tribe members access to government loans and other services, including the tribal tax exemption. By 1967, he had asked Oklahoma Congressman Ed Edmondson to try to repeal the termination act. Congress finally repealed the law on August 24, 1970.

=== Seneca Nation ===
On August 31, 1964, H.R. 1794, An Act to authorize payment for certain interests in lands within the Allegheny Indian Reservation in New York, was passed by Congress and sent to the president for signature. The bill authorized payment for resettling and rehabilitation of the Seneca Indians. As part of their reservation was affected by the construction of the Kinzua Dam on the Allegheny River, 127 Seneca families (about 500 people) were being dislocated. The legislation provided benefits for the entire Seneca Nation, because the taking of the Indian land for the dam broke (abridged) a 1794 treaty between the Government and the Senecas. In addition, the bill provided that within three years, a plan from the Interior Secretary should be submitted to Congress withdrawing all federal supervision over the Seneca Nation. (Technically the state of New York, and not the Federal Government, had had supervision over the Senecas since 1949.)

Accordingly, on September 5, 1967, a memo from the Department of the Interior announced that legislation had been proposed to end federal ties with the Seneca. In 1968 a new liaison was appointed from the BIA for the tribe to assist the tribe in preparing for termination and rehabilitation. Like the Choctaw, the Seneca were able to hold off termination until President Nixon issued his Special Message to the Congress on Indian Affairs in July 1970.

== Jurisdictional terminations and restorations ==
Termination acts were passed dealing with particular tribes or groups of tribes because of special circumstances. They followed the basic termination policies, but sometimes had minor variations. In some cases, when termination was reversed, the government granted recognition, but no restoration of federal trust lands occurred. Some of those tribes, specifically in California, are still seeking restoration of reservation lands.

=== Menominee Termination Act ===
The Menominee tribe of Wisconsin was one of the first tribes proposed for termination. Observers believed they did not need governmental services because of the value of their timber lands. On June 17, 1954, Congress passed the Menominee Termination Act, ending the special relationship between the Menominee tribe of Wisconsin and the federal government. Though the act was passed in 1954, it was not until April 30, 1961, that they were officially terminated.

The Menominee did not initially cooperate with the new policy. They had recently won a court case against the government over mismanagement of forestry enterprises, and Senator Watkins threatened to withhold the $8.5 million settlement unless the Menominee agreed to termination. Previously, the tribe had been able to support themselves and fund most social programs with revenue generated by the logging industry and lumber mill. Their economic situation, however, was precarious since they only had one resource.

This act was unique because it left out termination of Menominee hunting and fishing rights. The state of Wisconsin tried to subject the Menominee tribe to state hunting and fishing regulations, including requiring individuals to get permits for hunting. When the tribe filed suit against the state to defend their treaty rights, the Wisconsin Supreme Court upheld these regulations. They ruled that Congress had abrogated all Menominee hunting and fishing rights by passing the Menominee Termination Act.

The tribe appealed to the Supreme Court of the United States in 1968 in Menominee Tribe v. United States. The U.S. Supreme Court found that termination of a tribe did not abrogate treaty rights unless there was specific legislative intent to do so. The Menominees' hunting and fishing rights were guaranteed under the Wolf River Treaty of 1854. Since the Menominee Termination Act made no mention of these treaty hunting and fishing rights, the U.S. Supreme Court found that the treaty rights had not been abrogated. They ruled that the Menominee were still entitled to their traditional hunting and fishing rights free from state control.

The Wisconsin Supreme Court had gone against Public Law 280 when they denied the Menominee their hunting and fishing rights (124 N.W.2d 41, 1963). Public Law 280 explicitly states that "Nothing in this section ... shall deprive any Indian or any Indian tribe, band, or community of any right, privilege, or immunity afforded under Federal treaty, agreement or statute with respect to hunting, trapping, or fishing or the control, licensing, or regulation thereof." These proceedings show that while the abrogation of federal treaties is legal (under Lone Wolf v. Hitchcock), Congressional intent to abrogate these treaties cannot be inferred, it must be explicit. Unless specifically abrogated by Congress, treaty rights remain in effect, whether a tribe is terminated or not.

After they were terminated, the commonly held land and money were transferred to the corporation Menominee Enterprises, Inc. (MEI), and the geographical area of the reservation was admitted to the state as a new county. Menominee County soon became the poorest county in the state. MEI funds were rapidly depleted. Concern about corruption within MEI, including its selling of former tribal land, led community members such as Ada Deer and James White to form a group called the Determination of Rights and Unity for Menominee Stockholders (DRUMS) in 1970.

They fought to regain control of MEI and, by the end of 1972, they controlled the corporation. The activists worked to restore Menominee tribal government and regain sovereignty. Their success was reflected in the Menominee Restoration Act, signed by President Richard Nixon in 1973. With the help of the Menominee Restoration Committee (MCR), the reservation was reformed in 1975, a tribal constitution was signed in 1976, and the new tribal government took over in 1979.

=== Klamath Termination Act ===
The Klamath tribe in Oregon was terminated under the Klamath Termination Act, or Public Law 587, enacted on August 13, 1954. Under this act, all federal supervision over Klamath lands, as well as federal aid provided to the Klamath because of their special status as Indians, was terminated. The legislation required each tribal member to choose between remaining a member of the tribe, or withdrawing and receiving a monetary payment for the value of the individual share of tribal land. Those who stayed became members of a tribal management plan. This plan became a trust relationship between tribal members and the United States National Bank in Portland, Oregon. Of the 2,133 members of the Klamath tribe at the time of termination, 1,660 decided to withdraw from the tribe and accept individual payments for land.

The termination of the Klamath Reservation, in actuality included three distinct but affiliated tribes. The Act defines the members as the "Klamath and Modoc Tribes and the Yahooskin Band of Snake Indians, and of the individual members thereof". A portion of the Modoc Tribe, had been taken as prisoners to Indian Territory in 1873 following the Modoc War in Oregon. In 1965, as a part of the US settlement with the Klamath reservation, a series of hearings were held from April to August. The hearings concluded without allowing the Oklahoma Modoc to be included in the rolls of the Klamath Tribe.

Ironically, the western Modoc were restored to tribal status on May 15, 1978, in an Act which reinstated the Modoc, Wyandotte, Peoria and Ottawa Tribes of Oklahoma. Almost a decade later, through the leadership and vision of the Klamath people, and the assistance of a few congressional leaders, the Klamath Restoration Act was adopted into law in 1986, reestablishing the Klamath as a sovereign state.

=== Western Oregon Indian Termination Act ===
The Western Oregon Indian Termination Act, or Public Law 588, was passed in August 1954. It called for termination of federal supervision over the trust and restricted property of numerous Native American bands and small tribes, all located west of the Cascade Mountains in Oregon. The act also called for disposition of federally owned property which had been bought for the administration of Indian affairs, and for termination of federal services which these Indians received under federal recognition. The stipulations in this act were similar to those of most termination acts.

The Western Oregon Indian Termination Act was unique because of the number of tribes it affected. In all, 61 tribes in western Oregon were terminated. This total of tribes numbered more than the total of those terminated under all other individual acts. The history of the area, with the Coastal Reservation being established by Executive Order and not treaty, then separated into the Siletz and Grande Ronde Reservations, then those two reservations being combined, and yet again separated, makes the situation complicated, and difficult to ascertain specific tribal data. The final roll of the Confederated Tribes of Siletz contained 929 names and the final roll of the Confederated Tribes of Grand Ronde contained 862 names. The combined total of these two confederations' population was 1,791, though there may well have been scattered Native peoples in the coastal region who were not affiliated with these reservations.

There were restoration acts that restored all of the bands who had tribe members that had been located on the Grand Ronde or Siletz Reservations. Some of these tribes were restored with those acts and later obtained their own federal recognition.

- November 18, 1977: Confederated Tribes of Siletz Indians were restored by federal statute, Public Law No. 95-195, 91 Stat. 1415 Records of the Bureau of Land Management confirm that upon restoration 4,250.68 acres of land were re-established in the federal trust.
- December 29, 1982: Cow Creek Band of Umpqua Tribe of Indians were restored by federal statute, Public Law 97-391 96 Stat. 1960 Any tribal members who wished to remain members of the Confederated Tribes of the Grand Ronde Community were allowed to do that.
- November 22, 1983: Confederated Tribes of the Grand Ronde Community were restored by federal statute. Public Law No. 98-165, 97 Stat. 1064 Upon restoration 10,678.36 acres of land were placed back into trust by the Bureau of Land management.
- October 17, 1984: Confederated Tribes of Coos, Lower Umpqua and Siuslaw Indians were restored by federal statute, Public Law No. 98-481, 98 Stat. 2250; though they had been restored as part of the Confederated Tribes of Siletz Indians in 1977. 130.50 acres were placed into the Bureau of Land Management's trust upon tribal restoration.
- June 28, 1989: Coquille Indian Tribe were restored by Federal Statute, Public Law 101-42, though they had been restored as part of the Confederated Tribes of Siletz Indians in 1977. The Bureau of Land Management placed 6,481.95 acres of land into trust for the tribe upon restoration.

=== Alabama-Coushatta Tribe of Texas Termination Act ===
On August 23, 1954, the United States Congress passed two laws to terminate the federal relationship with the Alabama-Coushatta Tribe of Texas. Public Law ch. 831, §1, 68 Stat. 768 provided that the Secretary of the Interior was to transfer to the State of Texas the tribal lands for the benefit of the tribe. In addition, it terminated the federal trust relationship to the tribe and the individual members of the tribe and canceled any federal debts.

On March 22, 1983, Texas Attorney General Jim Mattox released an opinion (JM-17) stating that the state's assumption of power over the property of the Alabama-Coushatta was a violation of the Texas Constitution. He stated that as the federal government had withdrawn its recognition that the tribe was "merely an unincorporated association under Texas law, with the same legal status as other private associations ... the 3,071-acre tract is entirely free from any legally meaningful designation as an 'Indian Reservation'". In response to concerns by the tribe, Representative Ronald D. Coleman of Texas introduced a federal bill on February 28, 1985, to restore federal jurisdiction for the tribe. Because the initial bill HR 1344 allowed gambling, amendments were made and the Yselta del Sur Pueblo and Alabama and Coushatta Indian Tribes of Texas Restoration Act was reintroduced as HR 318. Public Law 100-89, 101 STAT. 666 was enacted 18 August 1987 and restored the federal relationship with the tribe. Section 107 specifically prohibits all gaming activities prohibited by the laws of the state of Texas.

=== Ute Indians of Utah ===
On August 27, 1954, the US Congress passed Public Law 671 Chapter ch. 1009 68 Stat. 868 to partition the Ute Indian Tribe of the Uintah and Ouray Reservation in Utah between the mixed-blood and full-blood members. The Act provided for termination of federal supervision over the mixed-blood property. In addition, it created a development program to assist the full-blood members to prepare for federal termination. Anyone with less than half Ute blood was automatically classified as part of the mixed-blood group. Anyone with more than half Ute blood quantum was allowed to choose which group they wished to be part of going forward.

Under the Act, the mixed-bloods elected their own tribal council, the Affiliated Ute Citizens (AUC), which in turn created the Ute Distribution Corporation (UDC) to manage their oil, gas, and mineral rights and unliquidated claims against the federal government as part of the plan for distributing assets to individual mixed-bloods. The UDC issued stock shares to mixed-bloods and which could be redeemed through the First Security Bank of Utah. Mixed-bloods who wanted to dispose of their stock prior to August 27, 1964, had to give first-refusal rights to tribe members.

In November 2002, mixed-bloods whose citizenship in the tribe had been terminated filed a civil action in the Washington DC US District Court, Felter vs. Kempthorne, to repeal the Ute Partition Act. On 27 January 2006, the case was dismissed and an appeal was filed. In a decision dated January 19, 2007, the US Court of Appeals for the District of Columbia ordered the remand to the district court for further review.

=== Paiute Indian Tribe of Utah ===
On September 1, 1954, the US Congress passed Termination of Federal Supervision over Paiute Indians of Utah U.S. Code, Title 25, Sections 741–60. The legislation at §742 specified that the included bands were the Shivwits, Kanosh, Koosharem, and Indian Peaks Bands of the Paiute Indian Tribe (omitting the Cedar Band). As with other termination agreements, the Act provided for termination of federal trusts and distribution of tribal lands to individuals or a tribally organized entity. It had provisions to preserve the tribal water rights and a special education program to assist tribal members in learning how to earn a living, conduct affairs, and assume their responsibilities as citizens. The Bureau of Land management terminated tribal trusts on March 1, 1957, as did the Indian Health Service.

On April 3, 1980, Congress passed the Paiute Indian Tribe of Utah Restoration Act, Public Law 96-227 94 Stat. 317, which restored the federal trust relationship of the Shivwits, Kanosh, Koosharem, and Indian Peaks Bands of the Paiute Indian Tribe and restored and reaffirmed that the Cedar Band was part of the Tribe. The law acknowledged that the Kanosh, Koosharem, and Indian Peaks Bands had lost their lands as a result of termination and that the Cedar Band had never had any. It proposed to develop within two years of enactment a plan to secure reservation land for the tribe not to exceed 15,000 acres. The Bureau of Land management reinstituted the federal trust on 43,576.99 concurrent with the enactment of the statute.

=== Oklahoma Termination Acts ===
On August 1, 2, and 3, 1956, Congress passed three related Acts terminating the federal supervision of the Ottawa Tribe of Oklahoma; the Peoria Tribe of Indians of Oklahoma; and the Wyandotte Tribe of Oklahoma. All three Acts were substantially identical and called for the termination of federal supervision over trust lands at the end of three years by creating the means to transfer to individual members the property of the tribes. The Wyandotte Nation was not successfully terminated due to a legal complication.

On May 15, 1978, in a single Act, entitled Public Law 95-281, the termination laws were repealed and the three tribes were reinstated with all rights and privileges they had prior to termination. A special section of the Reinstatement Act addresses the Modoc Tribe of Oklahoma confirming that the provisions of the Klamath Termination Act did not apply to them except as provided for sharing in future claims against the United States.

Oklahoma terminated tribes
| | Reservation | Tribal entity | Date of termination | Date of reinstatement | Date of land restoration | Details |
|---|---|---|---|---|---|---|
| 1. | Ottawa Tribe of Oklahoma | Ottawa Tribe of Oklahoma | August 3, 1959 | May 15, 1978 | May 15, 1978 | By federal Statute. Public Law ch. 909, 70 Stat. 963. The Bureau of Land Management effectively terminated the tribal trusts on 3 August 1959. Upon reinstatement, 26.63 acres of land was restored to tribal trust. |
| 2. | Peoria Tribe of Indians of Oklahoma | Peoria Tribe of Indians of Oklahoma | August 2, 1959 | May 15, 1978 | May 15, 1978 | By federal Statute. Public Law ch. 881, 70 Stat. 937. The Bureau of Land Management effectively terminated the tribal trusts on 2 August 1959. Upon reinstatement, 882.97 acres of land was restored to tribal trust. |

=== California Rancheria Termination Act ===
Three California Rancheria Termination Acts (and an amendment) were passed in the 1950s and 1960s. The first Act, passed in 1956, the second in 1957, and the final act of 1958 targeted 41 Rancherias for termination and an additional 7 under an amendment of 1964.

The first termination occurred on March 29, 1956, for the Koi Nation of the Lower Lake Rancheria in two laws, Public Law 443 [H. R. 585] 70 Stat. 58 and Public Law 751 [H. R. 11163] 70 Stat. 595 which amended the description of the property. After years of attempting to have their status reaffirmed, the Bureau of Indian Affairs "citing oversights in official records", recognized the tribe on December 29, 2000.

The second termination occurred on July 10, 1957, when the Coyote Valley Band of Pomo Indians was displaced with passage of Public Law 85-91 71 Stat. 283 authorizing the sale of the Coyote Valley Rancheria by the Secretary of the Interior to the Secretary of the Army for the Russian River Basin project to build the Coyote Valley Dam. Like the Koi Nation, this may have been a recording error, as the tribe is a federally recognized entity.

One final Rancheria appears to have been terminated prior to the 1958 Act. According to the Indian Health program records, Laguna Rancheria was terminated as of February 4, 1958.

On August 18, 1958, Congress passed the California Rancheria Termination Act, Public Law 85-671 (72 Stat. 619). The act called for the distribution of all 41 rancheria communal lands and assets to individual tribe members. Before the land could be distributed, the act called for a government survey of land on the rancheria. The government was required to improve or construct all roads serving the rancheria, to install or rehabilitate irrigation, sanitation, and domestic water systems, and to exchange land held in trust for the rancheria. All Indians who received a portion of the assets were ineligible to receive any more federal services rendered to them based on their status as Indians.

In 1964, an amendment to the California Rancheria Termination Act (78 Stat. 390) was enacted, terminating additional rancheria lands. Overall, then, there were three rancherias terminated prior to Public Law 85-671, 41 mentioned in Public Law 85-671, an additional 7 included in the amendment of 1964 and 5 that were never terminated but were listed, correcting the number of California Rancherias terminated from the oft-cited 41 to 46 total terminations.

Many tribes expressed dissatisfaction with termination immediately. Federal failures to live up to promised improvements and educational opportunities that were supposed to be part of an agreement to accept termination led eventually to lawsuits calling to reverse terminations.

The first successful challenge was for the Robinson Rancheria on March 22, 1977, and it was followed by 5 others: the Hopland Rancheria was restored on March 29, 1978; the Upper Lake Rancheria was restored on May 15, 1979; the Table Bluff Rancheria was restored on September 21, 1981; the Big Sandy Rancheria was restored on March 28, 1983; and the Table Mountain Rancheria was restored in June 1983. Each of these decisions only pertained to one reservation.

The success of these suits and frustration with unmet promises caused Tillie Hardwick in 1979 to consult with California Indian Legal Services, who decided to make a class action case. On July 19, 1983, a U.S. District Court in Tillie Hardwick, et al. v. United States of America, et al. Case #C-79-1710-SW ordered federal recognition of 17 of California's Rancherias. The Hardwick decision restored more terminated tribes than any other single case in California and prompted the majority of the terminated Rancherias to pursue federal restoration.

Of the 46 terminated Rancherias, 31 have been restored; 6 Rancherias are still attempting to restore their federal status.

=== Catawba Indian Tribe of South Carolina Termination Act ===
On September 21, 1959, Congress passed Public Law No. 86-322, 73 Stat. 592 calling for the termination of the Catawba Indian Tribe of South Carolina. The Bureau of Land Management terminated their trust status on July 2, 1960.

After termination in 1959, the Catawba nation in South Carolina was determined to fight to regain federal recognition. In 1973, the Catawba filed their petition with the United States Congress for federal recognition. It was not until 20 years later, November 20, 1993, that the land claim settlement with the state of South Carolina and the federal government finally came to an end.

Based on the Treaty of Nations Ford of 1840, the Catawba agreed to give up claims on land taken from them by the state of South Carolina. In return, the Catawba Indian Nation received federal recognition and $50 million for economic development, education, social services, and land purchases. On October 27, 1993, the US Congress enacted Public Law No. 103-116, 107 Stat. 1118, to restore the tribal relationship with the federal government and resolve the land disputes.

=== Ponca Tribe of Nebraska ===
On September 5, 1962, Public Law 87–629 76 Stat. 429 was passed terminating the Ponca Tribe of Nebraska. Conditions were similar to other termination agreements, but each tribal member was allotted up to 5 acres of tribal land for personal use as a homesite and the remaining lands were ordered to be sold. One special provision concerned retaining mineral rights to the property by individuals owning at least 25% in the land. The Bureau of Land Management confirmed that the federal trust was terminated on October 27, 1966.

Fred Leroy, a Ponca and Vietnam veteran, formed the Northern Ponca Restoration Committee in 1986–87 and began lobbying the state of Nebraska for recognition. In 1988 the state recognized the tribe and agreed to endorse them for federal restoration. On October 31, 1990, the Ponca Restoration Act was passed by Congress and signed by President George H.W. Bush. Concurrent with their restoration, the Bureau of Land Management restored the tribal trust lands of 241.84 acres.

=== Tiwa Indians of Texas (now known as Ysleta del Sur Pueblo) ===
On April 12, 1968, under Public Law 90–287 82 Stat. 93 the United States Congress relinquished all responsibility for the Tiwa Indians of Ysleta, Texas to the State of Texas. The Tiwa Indians Act specified that tribal members would be ineligible for any services, claims or demands from the United States as Indians.

Public Law 100-89 was enacted on August 18, 1987, and restored the federal relationship with the tribe simultaneously with those of the Alabama-Coushatta Tribe. The restoration act renamed the tribe to the Ysleta Del Sur Pueblo, repealed the Tiwa Indians Act, and specifically prohibited all gaming activities prohibited by the laws of the state of Texas.

== Alaska Natives ==
Because Alaska was not granted statehood until 1959, Native American issues played out differently there. The discovery of oil in the Kenai Peninsula and Cook Inlet regions in 1957 and along the North Slope in 1968 brought the issue of Native land ownership to the forefront of a conflict over state land selection.

In 1936, the Indian Reorganization Act (IRA) was extended to include Alaska Natives. As Alaska did not become a state until 1959, Alaska Natives were passed over as termination policy formed in 1953. The fervor for termination faded before Alaska Natives became subjects of the discussion. Alaska Natives hurriedly filed land claims with the United States Department of the Interior as state land selections and statehood drew closer.

Secretary of the Interior Stewart Udall was a supporter of the Natives. In 1966, he issued a freeze on state land selections. In 1969 he issued the Deep Freeze, which declared ninety percent of the state off limits to any form of federal land transfer. One of the main bodies responsible for representing the interests of the Alaska Natives is the Alaska Federation of Natives. From 1966 to 1971, this group lobbied for a fair land claims settlement act, which resulted in the Alaska Native Claims Settlement Act (ANCSA). ANCSA was intended both to provide the state with land promised in gaining statehood and the Natives with a 40-million-acre (160,000 km^{2}) land base.

This act (43 U.S.C. § 1617) was signed into law by President Richard Nixon on December 18, 1971. It revoked previous land claims by Alaska Natives. Initially, the legislation divided the land into twelve regional (a thirteenth would be added later for Natives living outside of the state) and 220 local corporations. U.S. citizens with one-fourth (equivalent to one grandparent) or more Alaska Indian, Eskimo, or Aleut blood living when the Act was passed were considered Native American and were qualified to participate in receiving dividends from oil production. Natives could register with their village or, if they chose not to enroll with their village, could become "at large" shareholders of the regional corporation (note: the Tsimshian Indians of the Annette Island Reserve of Metlakatla had been granted a reserve from Congress after emigrating from Canada; they were exempt from ANCSA).

Each registered member of the village corporations received 100 shares of stock in the village corporation. The corporations were granted the 44-million-acre (180,000 km^{2}) land base, or about twelve percent of the state of Alaska. In addition, they received around $962.5 million from both federal and state governments, which was distributed over eleven years. The first five years saw 10% of the money received go to the shareholders of the company, and 45% each to the regional and local corporations. Afterward, half of the money was distributed to the regional corporations and half to the village corporations and "at large" shareholders on a per capita basis.

=== Response and effects ===
The land grant came at a cost. Aboriginal title to the land and aboriginal hunting and fishing rights were extinguished by the act in exchange for fee-simple title to the land and monetary grants to the Native corporations. Certain aboriginal rights, including subsistence and medical care, were protected under other laws, including the Nelson Act of 1905, the Snyder Act of 1921, the Health Facilities Act of 1957, the Marine Mammal Protection Act, the Environmental Protection Act, the Indian Self-Determination Act of 1975, and the Indian Health Care Improvement Act of 1976. In addition, the Alaska National Interest Lands Conservation Act (ANILCA) protected over 100 million acres (400,000 km^{2}) of federal lands in Alaska and the subsistence lifestyle of the Alaska Natives. This act, passed into law in 1980, doubled the size of the country's national park and refuge system. It created 10 new national parks and increased the area of three existing units. By enacting this law, the government effectively protected land for Alaska Natives to continue subsistence living. These laws indicate that the government does not distinguish between tribal nations and Alaska Natives.

A negative aspect of the ANCSA was that any child born after the passage of the ANCSA could receive no shares under the statute but could become shareholders by inheritance. Shares could also be inherited by non-Natives, putting the Natives in a difficult position in trying to maintain Native control of the corporations. Shares could also be sold after a 20-year period. Sovereignty was extinguished with the ANCSA and all aboriginal rights were subject to state law. The village corporations owned only the surface of the selected land. Minerals located below the surface belonged to the regional corporations.

== Politics ==
The political climate after World War II based its ideology on building a patriotic, strong, conforming society with all ethnic groups melding together in which free democracy protected American principles of growth through one's own achievement. The Truman administration laid the groundwork for termination, authorizing the Indian Claims Commission to settle and pay off Indian groups and surveying conditions in Indian country with the Hoover Task Force. The claims and large expenditures for the survey, coupled with high war debt, led the Eisenhower administration to seek ways to retrench federal budgeting and spending.

In attempting to grasp what was meant by assimilation into the broader society, understanding the political landscape of the times is important. Assimilation did not mean amalgamation. Cultural diversity was not something to be appreciated, it was a problem that needed to be solved. This was the United States of "separate but equal." To put the period in historic context, House Concurrent Resolution 108 passed in 1953, McCarthyism was in full swing and the Communist Control Act of 1954 was designed to keep "collectivism" out of politics. Brown v. Board of Education was decided in 1954, and the US was a decade away from the passage of the Civil Rights Act of 1964. Anti-miscegenation laws were predominant and until the Perez v. Sharp decision of 1948 and Loving v. Virginia decision of 1967 racial inter-marriage was banned in over 30 states.

Allotment programs of the previous decades had led to surplus lands being sold by the government to allow non-tribal settlement on former reservation lands, creating an attitude that reservations were standing in the way of progress for both Native peoples and newly arrived whites. In fact, one of the main architects of the termination policy, Senator Arthur V. Watkins' parents had expanded their farm by purchasing surplus reservation lands from the Uintah and Ouray Reservation. But it was not just land for settlement; reservations were barriers to the government earning revenues from oil leases, mining leases, timber leases and hydroelectric dams. The perception was that the Indians were under-utilizing their resources and blocking the ability of the government to exploit the environment as a revenue base.

Politicians from both Democratic and Republican backgrounds supported termination and in truth geographic location may have played a much stronger role in support than party affiliation. A review of the political figures involved shows a preponderance of supporters were from western states with high Indian populations. In fact, rather than true opposition to termination, the question was whether termination should be unilaterally applied or whether tribal consent should be obtained. Even those who had a real understanding of Native peoples and customs, did not question that they should be terminated, but rather how quickly it should be done, how ready they were, whether Congress should immediately or gradually withdraw its trust obligations—in other words to what degree implementation would occur and when.

The Native political positions were a little more clearly in favor or opposition. The Bureau of Indian Affairs had had management issues for decades. Poorly trained personnel, inefficiency, corruption, and lack of consistent policy plagued the organization almost from its founding. For some tribes, relief from BIA oversight of policies and funds seemed as if it might pave the way for tribes to maintain their own traditional ways of operating. But for the vast majority of tribes, termination meant death – an end to sovereignty, an end to communal life, an end to services like healthcare, utilities, and education.

=== Legislative figures ===
Some of the major supporters of the termination movement included political appointees, which clearly illustrate that support was not particularly partisan. Truman's appointee as Commissioner of Indian Affairs, Dillon S. Myer, was a hard-line "Terminationist" as well as an advocate of complete assimilation. For example, in implementing the relocation program, Myer targeted school programs mainstreaming mixed-bloods into public schools and allowing only full-bloods to attend reservation schools, forbidding education on Indian cultures. Myers' militaristic style resulted in calls for his replacement when Eisenhower was elected, culminating in the appointment of Glenn L. Emmons. Emmons had lived and worked among New Mexico's Indians and while he favored termination, he was a "Protectionist", believing that with a gradual withdrawal of government assistance, Native peoples would learn to be self-sufficient. He opposed programs that exploited Native vulnerability and failed to take their wishes into consideration.

Truman's first Secretary of the Interior Julius Krug forsook his obligation to preserve Alaskan Natives' rights to the Tongass National Forest. It was widely believed that he had relinquished responsibility to protect the Alaskan Natives in favor of corporate timber interests. Though urged to stop passage of the Tongass Timber Bill and set aside reservation lands, instead the bill was passed (Public Law 385) in 1947. The following year, Krug prepared the Krug Indian Land Confiscation Bill to put an end to all Native land claims in Alaska but was forced to abandon the measure due to opposition shortly before he resigned. Krug was replaced by Oscar L. Chapman, a "Protectionist" who was a supporter of Bosone's termination amendment requiring tribal assent. Eisenhower's election saw a shift back to a "Terminationist" Secretary of the Interior, with the appointment of Douglas McKay. McKay, former Republican governor of Oregon, supported termination as a means of fully assimilating the Indians. Orme Lewis, Arizona Republican and Assistant Secretary of the Interior Department, clearly supported termination and was one of the primary officials to meet with Watkins to map out the termination policy.

The ranks of "Protectionist" elected officials—who felt that the Tribes should be consulted, policies should move slowly, and termination should occur only when Indians were ready—were small, but powerful. Some of the leaders were Utah Senator Reva Beck Bosone, Democrat who introduced House Joint Resolution 490, which allowed termination only with the Indians' consent, on their own terms, as she felt they were capable of managing their own affairs. Oregon Senator Richard L. Neuberger, Democrat and Oregon Representative Albert Ullman, Democrat worked together to delay implementation of the Klamath termination law until hearings with the Indians were held and amendments could be made.

Montana Senator James Murray, Democrat and Montana Representative Lee Metcalf, Democrat strongly opposed ending federal trust status unless the tribes had requested it. and worked on four proposals demanding restoration of the federal responsibility for Indian welfare, education, employment and health care. New Mexico Senator Clinton P. Anderson, Democrat advocated that the views of the tribes should be considered, or legislation should not be passed, as did Oregon Senator Guy Cordon, Republican.

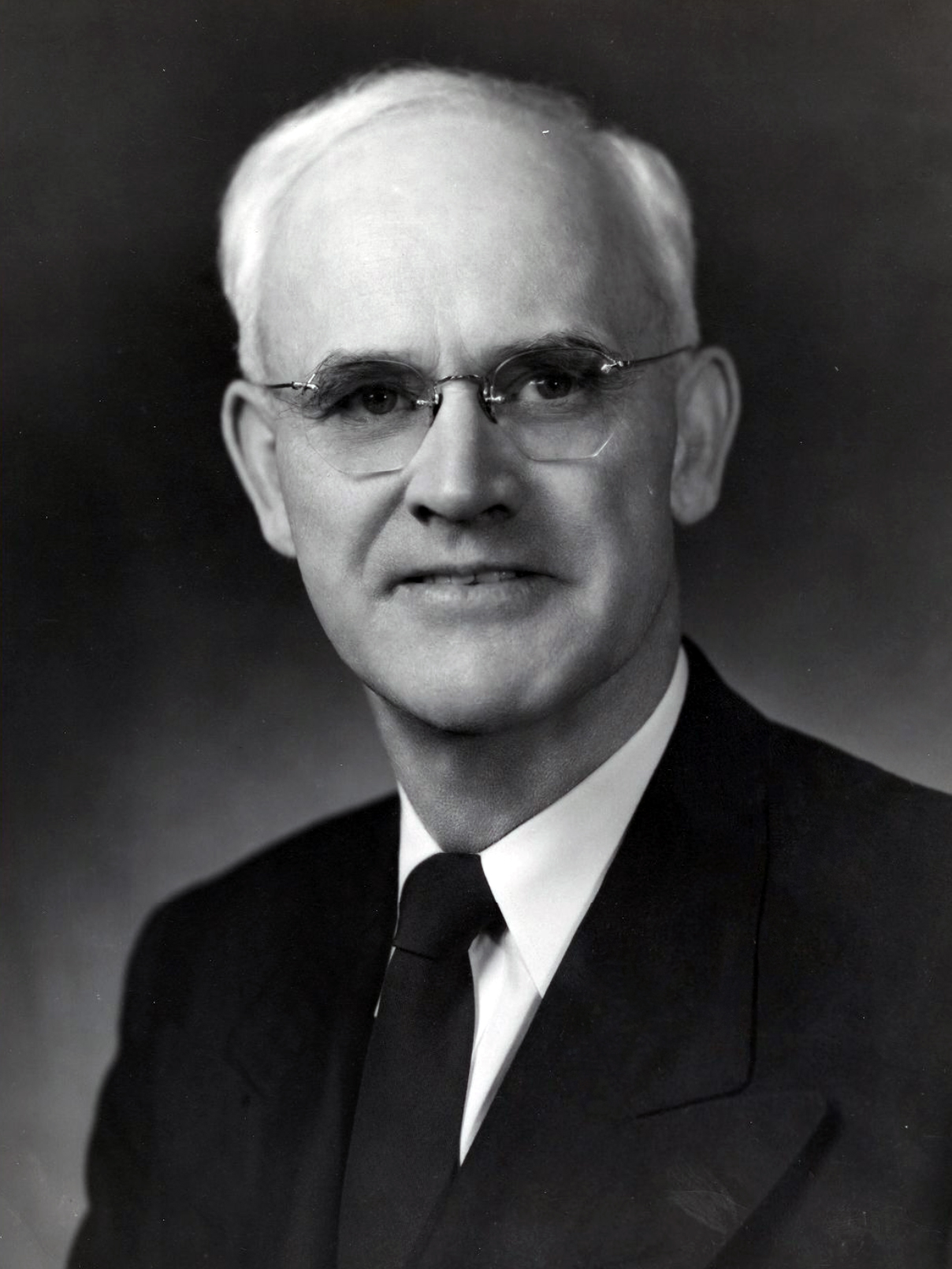
Republican Senator Arthur Watkins of Utah was the chief Congressional proponent of Indian termination

The chief Congressional proponent of Indian termination and leader of the "Terminationists" was Republican Senator Arthur V. Watkins of Utah. He was appointed as chairman of the Senate Subcommittee on Indian Affairs in 1947, shortly after he was elected to the Senate and quickly went to work to free the Indians from their wardship status under the BIA.

William H. Harrison (Wyoming Republican Congressman) met with Watkins on February 27, 1953, to map out the strategy for termination and subsequently introduced House Concurrent Resolution 108 into the House, while Henry M. Jackson (Washington Democratic Senator) introduced it into the Senate. E.Y. Berry (South Dakota Republican Congressman), was the chairman of the House Indian Affairs Subcommittee, the corollary position to Watkin's own chairmanship in the House of Representatives.

Patrick McCarran (Nevada Democratic Senator), introduced the McCarran Amendment in 1952 as part of the Department of Justice's Appropriation Act. The Amendment was supposed to simplify Indian water rights by waiving, on a limited basis, the U.S. sovereign immunity for state litigation involving water. Since Native rights are held in the name of the U.S., the Supreme Court ruled in 1971 in the US v. District Court for the County of Eagle and US v. District Court for Water Division No. 5, that their rights are usage rights and not legal title; thus, states can determine whether tribal rights apply or not. Karl E. Mundt South Dakota Republican Congressman), believed that unless a permanent solution to Indian claims was offered, "detribalization" would remain out of reach and Native Americans would continue to rely on the government to do what they should be doing for themselves. William Langer (North Dakota Republican Senator), chairman of the Senate Civil Service Committee saw dissolution of the BIA as a means to reduce excessive government spending.

=== Tribal figures ===
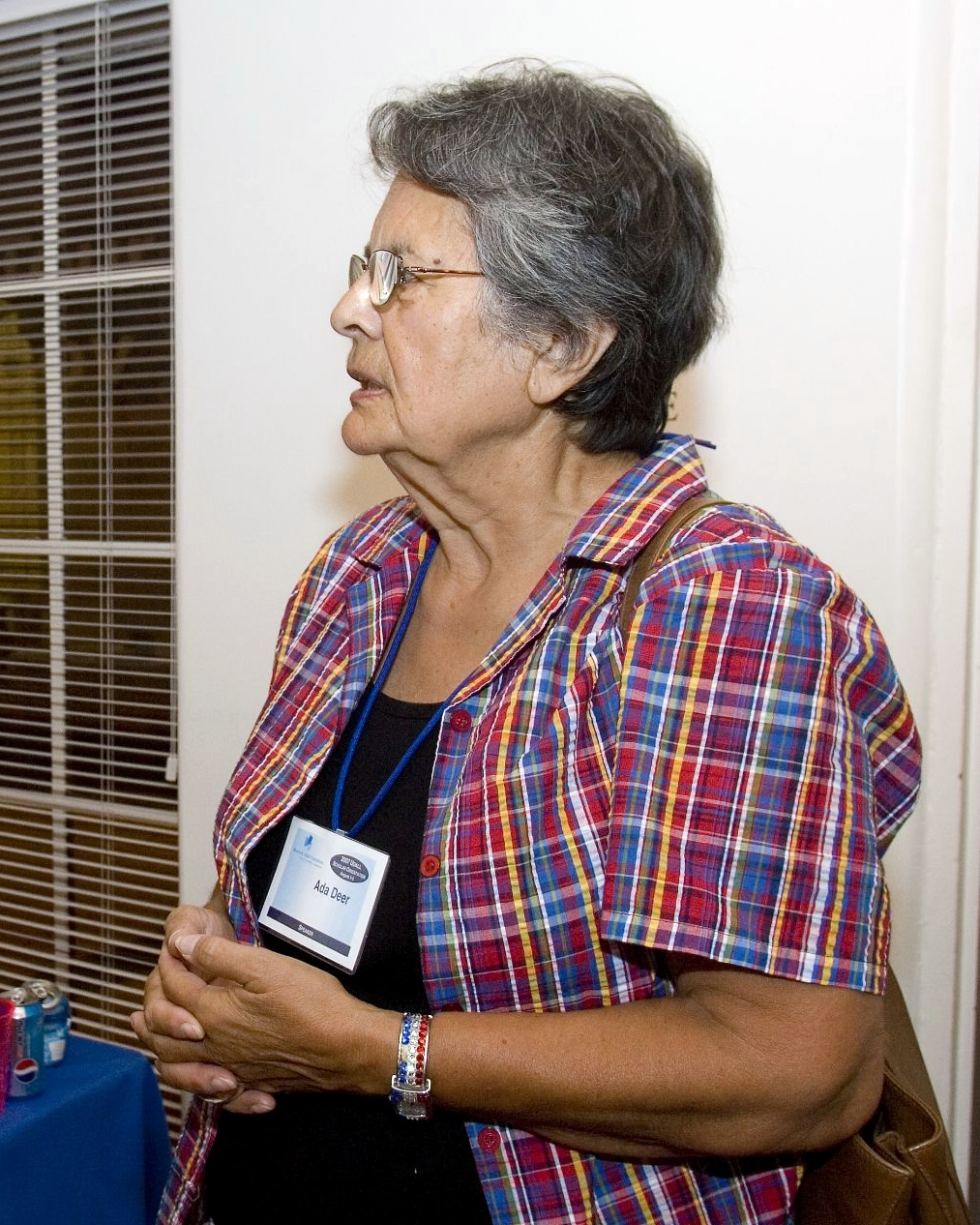
Ada Deer was not in favor of termination.

Several tribal leaders played important roles in the process of termination, including Choctaw Chief Harry J. W. Belvin. Belvin lobbied heavily for Choctaw termination, which contributed to the tribe's being one of more than 100 scheduled for termination. The effective date of the policy was pushed back three times, and the termination law was repealed in 1970, after another change in policy. Many of the younger members of the Choctaw tribe opposed termination and got Belvin's attention. By 1970, Belvin had turned from supporting termination to advocating its repeal.

Ada Deer was instrumental in reversing termination. She was a leader in regaining tribal status for the Menominee tribe. Deer and other Menominee leaders believed that "only repeal of the termination act, return of the land to its trust status, and full recognition of the tribe and its sovereign authority could right the wrongs against their people and their land". Ada Deer faced strong opposition from House Interior Committee chairman Wayne Aspinall, who had been a long-time supporter of termination. The Menominee bill to reverse termination had to go through his committee. Deer's work paid off when Aspinall was upset in the Colorado Democratic primary in 1972, and thus lost his committee chair.

In 1973, Congressmen Lloyd Meeds and Manuel Lujan held House field hearings. The Menominee Restoration Act moved quickly through Congress, and President Richard Nixon signed it into law December 1973. In 1975, the restoration was complete when Secretary of the Interior Rogers Morton held a ceremony in which he signed the documents that dissolved Menominee Enterprises, Incorporated. He gave all Menominee lands back to the tribe. Ada Deer's work to reverse Menominee termination was successful.

James White worked alongside Ada Deer to help bring about the reversal of termination. White helped found the organization known as Determination of Rights and Unity for Menominee Stockholders (DRUMS) in 1970. Members of DRUMS strongly protested the development of the Legend Lake project and put up their own candidates for election to Menominee Enterprises, Inc. board of directors. DRUMS succeeded in blocking the planned Legend Lake development and controlled most of the board of MEI by 1972. In addition, White's work with DRUMS helped bring about the reversal of Menominee termination.

Tillie Hardwick was a Pomo Indian woman who was instrumental in reversing the California Indian Rancheria termination policy of the U.S. government. She filed suit on behalf of the Pinoleville Indian Rancheria in 1979 which was modified into a class action lawsuit in 1982. The case, Tillie Hardwick, et al. v. United States of America, et al. Case #C-79-1710-SW (often cited as Hardwick I) confirmed, as of December 22, 1983, that 17 of the California Rancherias had been wrongfully terminated and reaffirmed their recognition by the federal government. As many of the tribes involved had lost their lands to private parties, an amended Hardwick case was filed in 1986 (often cited as Hardwick II) to partially restore land claims. The Hardwick case affected more tribes than any other case in California and became precedent not only for additional wrongful termination cases but is cited in nearly every gaming decision for the California tribes.

Bill Osceola (June 30, 1919 – April 16, 1995) participated in both the March 1–2, 1954 and April 6–7, 1955 Congressional hearings on the Seminole Tribe of Florida. On April 4, 1955, when the tribe created a board of directors to organize the tribe, he was appointed chairman. Lacking the necessary funds to make repeated trips to Washington, D.C., and Tallahassee, Florida to argue their case, Osceola came up with a plan to build a rodeo arena on the Dania Reservation as a tourist attraction. He convinced cattlemen in Brighton to commit cattle and got lumber donations from people in Broward County. Opening day at the Rodeo saw 500 spectators and proceeds were used to organize the tribe and gain federal recognition. The rodeo that Osceola began in an effort to save his tribe was christened on February 7, 1997, as the Bill Osceola Memorial Rodeo, to honor his memory.

In February 1954 in hearings before the joint Senate and House Subcommittees on Indian Affairs in Washington, D.C., two delegations from Kansas were successfully able to thwart termination attempts against the Kansas Tribes. Prairie Band of Potawatomi Nation tribal chair Minnie Evans, along with James Wahbnosah and John Wahwassuck and a delegation from the Kickapoo Tribe in Kansas Tribal Council including members Vestana Cadue, Oliver Kahbeah, and Ralph Simon traveled at their own expense to argue against termination.

== Effects ==
During 1953–1964, more than 100 tribes were terminated, approximately 1,365,801 acres (5,527 km^{2}) of trust land were removed from protected status, and 13,263 Native Americans lost tribal affiliation. As a result of termination, the special federal trustee relationship of the Indians with the federal government ended, they were subjected to state laws, and their lands were converted to private ownership.

The tribes disapproved of Public Law 280, as they disliked states having jurisdiction without tribal consent. The State governments also disapproved of the law, as they did not want to take on jurisdiction for additional areas without additional funding. Consequently, additional amendments to Public Law 280 were passed to require tribal consent in law enforcement. On May 3, 1958, the Inter Tribal Council of California (ITCC) was founded in response to the pressures of termination and other issues.

Many scholars believe that the termination policy had devastating effects on tribal autonomy, culture and economic welfare. The lands belonging to the Native Americans, rich in resources, were taken over by the federal government. The termination policy had disastrous effects on the Menominee tribe (located in Wisconsin) and the Klamath tribes (located in Oregon), forcing many members of the tribes onto the public assistance roll.

Termination had a devastating effect on the health care and education of Indians along with the economic stability of tribes. Along with the end of federal control over land came the end of many federal services which included education and health care.

=== Education ===
By 1972, termination clearly had affected the tribes' education. There was a 75% dropout rate for the Menominee Tribe, which resulted in a generation of Menominee children who had only a ninth grade education. The tribes lost federal support for their schools, and the states were expected to assume the role of educating the Indian children. The Menominee children, for example, did not have their own tribal schools anymore and were discriminated against within the public schools. The Menominee education program became a part of Joint School District No. 8. Younger children were still able to attend schools close to their homes, but high school students had to travel to either Gresham or Shawano, Wisconsin for schooling. All terminated tribes faced new education policies, which gave the children fewer educational opportunities that were not as good as what the whites received.

The idea of termination was to restore complete sovereignty to the United States, and to encourage assimilation into a modern, individualistic society, rather than a tribal one. In 1966 the Keshena and Neopit 3rd and 6th graders' success on the Iowa Test for basic skills was compared to the rest of their school district (Joint School District No. 8). The school district had a composite grade for the 3rd and 6th graders of 82% and 60%, respectively. However, the two schools composed mostly of Indian students had drastically lower scores. Keshena's scores on this same test were about 13% for the 3rd graders and 17% for the 6th graders, while Neopit's were 15% for the 3rd graders and 8% for the 6th graders. From these test scores, it can be seen that education was not improved when termination occurred, and the Indians' level of education was nowhere near that of whites in the area.

Terminated tribal children struggled to stay in school, and those who did were excluded from programs that paid for higher Indian education. In 1970 the BIA began to make annual grants that gave scholarships to Indians to attend college. This helped the non-terminated tribes, but individuals within terminated tribes were not allowed to apply for these funds. As a result, individuals who were successful and managed to graduate from high school had trouble going to college because they could not apply for scholarship assistance.

=== Health care ===
The Indian Health Service provided health care for many Indian tribes, but once a tribe was terminated all tribe members lost their eligibility. Many no longer had easy access to hospitals and had no means to get health care. For example, the Menominee people had no tribal hospitals or clinics. The tribal hospital at Keshena had to close because it did not meet state standards, and the lack of funds available prevented the county from making improvements. Along with the hospital, the tribal clinic was also closed after termination occurred. When there was a tuberculosis epidemic, 25% of the people were affected and had no means to get treatment because there was no longer a hospital or a clinic. The health standards of Indians fell well below those of whites. The Menominee tribe had three times the infant mortality rate as the rest of the state. Dental care was also affected by termination; ninety percent of school age children in the Menominee tribe were in need of dental care, which was no longer provided as a free service since they did not have tribal status. The Western Oregon tribes who were terminated, much like the Menominee tribe, also felt the effects of termination on their health care services. In a 1976 survey, 75% of the Indians in Western Oregon reported needing dental care and 30% were in need of eyeglasses. In addition to affecting adults, schools also reported that the primary problem for Indian children was the need of medical treatment that their parents could not afford.

Many Indians relocated off the reservations during termination and also had no access to health care. When they relocated they were given private health care for six months, but then they had none unless they were close to a city with an Indian health care facility. Eventually the Bureau of Indian Affairs could not provide necessary health services for the many tribes that were terminated, and Congress began reform the Indian health care policy. In 1955, the Indian Health Service was transferred from the administration of the BIA to the Public Health Service, which resulted in an almost immediate improvement in funding, training and services. By 1964 the reforms were leading to progress, as Indian life expectancy rose from 51 years in 1940 to 63.5 years.

=== Economy ===
Termination, although not the only cause of Indian poverty, had a significant effect on it. The Menominee tribe proves a strong example of this; although the economy of the Menominee tribe had never flourished, it became even worse after the tribe was terminated. Prior to termination, Menominee income centered around the mill which was built on a community philosophy and tried to employ as many individuals as possible. After termination the mill was run as a business and unemployment rose to between 18 and 28 percent. The mill did generate increased net sales, however; $4,865,000 in 1973 compared to $1,660,700 in 1961. Despite higher sales, the mill's net loss was also much higher in 1973 ($709,000 compared with only a net loss of $108,700 in 1961); this was largely due to the mill's property taxes increasing from $164,000 in 1961 to $607,300 in 1973. With no new industry and the new taxes being introduced, 80 percent of the tribal population fell below the poverty line. In the 1960s, they were forced to sell ancestral land and went from having $10 million in a federal reserve to being considered a "pocket of poverty". Welfare costs within the county also increased during the period of termination. In 1963, tribal members were given a total of $49,723 for welfare, but by 1968 the amount had nearly doubled. As termination continued, the struggles only became worse for the tribe.

As termination continued, the unemployment rates continued to increase. The Menominee tribe had 800 individuals within the tribe and 220 individuals who were unemployed in June 1968. By June 1973, right before the termination policy ended, the tribe had almost a 40 percent unemployment rate, with only 660 individuals in the tribe and 260 individuals who were unemployed.

The Menominee Indians experienced high poverty rates from the very beginning of termination, unlike the Klamath Tribe which was able to escape poverty for a brief period. The Klamath tribe had for years been living off timber and revenue from leasing tribal lands. When termination occurred, tribal land was sold and most of the Klamath tribe was considered above the poverty line, because each tribal member gained $40,000 from the sale. While they had escaped poverty briefly, their economy still suffered from termination. Most families quickly spent the money earned from the initial land sale and were forced to sell more land in order obtain food for the family. After just a few years, the Klamath tribe was in the same situation as many other tribes that were terminated.

== In fiction ==
- The Night Watchman written by Louise Erdrich is a historical novel that covers the issues and time period of the Indian termination policy and was inspired by her grandfather who chaired the Turtle Mountain Band of Chippewa and fought the Congressional initiative to move Indigenous Americans off their land.
- Indian No More is a middle grade novel by Charlene Willing Mcmanis (with Traci Sorrell) covers the experinces of a 12-year-old Umpqua girl following the legal termination of her tribe, and her family's subsequent move to Los Angeles as part of the Indian Relocation Program. The novel draws upon the tribal history of the author.

== See also ==
- Federal Indian Policy
- Americanization (of Native Americans)
- Indian Reorganization Act
- Former Indian Reservations in Oklahoma
- 1969 White Paper - Canadian equivalent
- Detribalization
- Detraditionalization
- Tribal disenrollment
- Paper genocide
- Vanishing Indian

== Sources ==
- Davis, Mary B., ed. (1996). Native America in the twentieth century: an encyclopedia. Assistant editors: Joan Berman, Mary E. Graham, Lisa A. Mitten. New York: Garland Pub. ISBN 978-0-8153-2583-3.
- Fixico, Donald Lee (1986). Termination and Relocation: Federal Indian Policy, 1945-1960. University of New Mexico Press. ISBN 978-0-8263-0908-2.
- Lewis, David Gene (2009). Termination of the Confederated Tribes of the Grand Ronde Community of Oregon: Politics, Community, Identity (PDF) (PhD dissertation). University of Oregon. hdl:1794/10067. OCLC 742374764.
- Mahon, John K.; Weisman, Brent R. (1996). Florida's Seminole and Miccosukee Peoples. University Press of Florida. ISBN 978-0-8130-1415-9.
- Metcalf, R. Warren (2002). Termination's Legacy: The Discarded Indians of Utah. Lincoln: University of Nebraska Press. ISBN 978-0-8032-3201-3.
- Philp, Kenneth R. (1999). Termination Revisited: American Indians on the Trail to Self-determination, 1933-1953. University of Nebraska Press. ISBN 978-0-8032-3723-0.
- Shattuck, George C. (1991). The Oneida Land Claims: A Legal History. Syracuse University Press. ISBN 9780815625254.
- Tigerman, Kathleen (2006). Wisconsin Indian Literature: Anthology of Native Voices. University of Wisconsin Press. ISBN 9780299220648.
- Ulrich, Roberta (2010). American Indian Nations from Termination to Restoration, 1953-2006. University of Nebraska Press. ISBN 978-0-8032-3364-5.
- Weeks, Philp (2014). "They Made Us Many Promises": The American Indian Experience 1524 to the Present. John Wiley & Sons. ISBN 9781118822821.
- Wunder, John R. (1999). Native American Sovereignty. Taylor & Francis. ISBN 9780815336297.
- John J. Francis; Stacy L. Leeds; Aliza Organick & Jelani Jefferson Exum (2011). "Reassessing Concurrent Tribal–State–Federal Criminal Jurisdiction in Kansas" (PDF). Kansas Law Review. 59: 949–989. Archived from the original (PDF) on June 17, 2016.
