= Kickapoo Tribe in Kansas =

Federally recognized tribe of Kickapoo people

Kickapoo Tribe of Indians of the Kickapoo Reservation in Kansas
- Location of Kickapoo Indian Reservation in Kansas

Total population
- 1,653 (2006)

Regions with significant populations
- United States (Kansas)

Languages
- English, formerly Kickapoo

Religion
- traditional tribal religion, Native American Church, Drum religion

Related ethnic groups
- other Kickapoo people and Meskwaki, Sauk, and Shawnee people

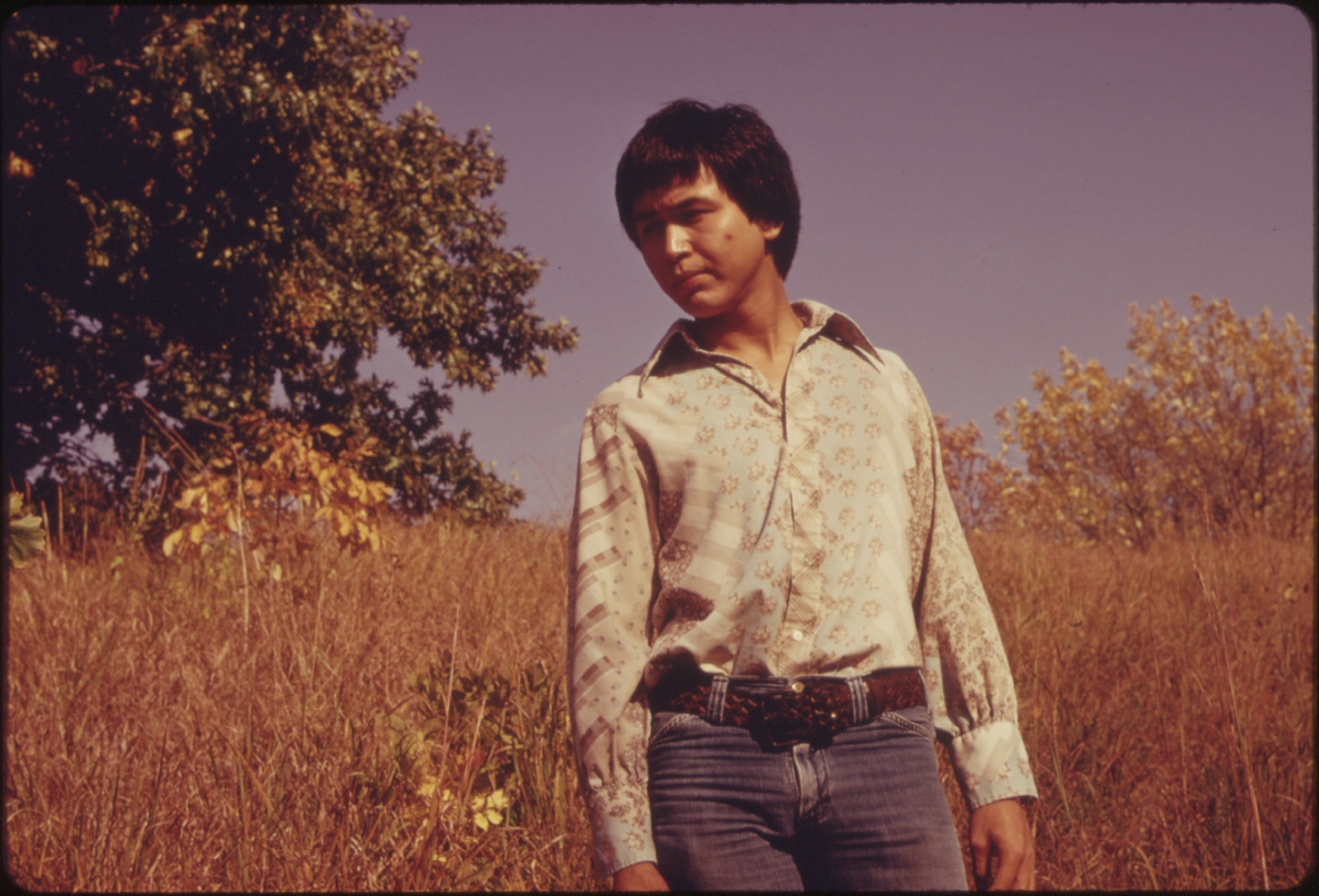
Ron McKinney (Kickapoo-Potawatomi), Doniphan County, Kansas (1974)

The Kickapoo Tribe of Indians of the Kickapoo Reservation in Kansas is one of three Federally recognized tribes of Kickapoo people. The other Kickapoo tribes in the United States are the Kickapoo Traditional Tribe of Texas and the Kickapoo Tribe of Oklahoma. The Tribu Kikapú are a distinct subgroup of the Oklahoma Kickapoo and reside on a hacienda near Múzquiz Coahuila, Mexico; they also have a small band located in the Mexican states of Sonora and Durango.

The Kansas Kickapoo Tribe runs and owns 50 plus programs that include: a Boys and Girls Club, Kickapoo Head Start and Early Head Start, Senior Center, IHS Health Center, and the Kickapoo Nation school, which teaches grades from kindergarten through 12th grade.

== Reservation ==
The Kickapoo Indian Reservation in Kansas is located in Brown County in northeastern Kansas. The reservation is approximately five by six miles (8.0 by 9.7 km) in size or 19,200 acres (78 km^{2}).

== Government ==
Map of the Kickapoo Tribe and neighboring tribes in Kansas.

The Kickapoo Tribe in Kansas is headquartered in Horton, Kansas. The tribe is governed by an elected Kickapoo Tribal Council. The current administration is:

- Chairman: Gail Chatham
- Vice-Chairman: Priscilla Wakole
- Treasurer: Grace Ross
- Secretary: Howard Allen
- Member: Sharon Doxtator
- Member: Precilla Wakole
- Member: Sunny Boado

== Language ==
Members of the Kansas Kickapoo speak English; formerly they spoke the Kickapoo language, part of the Algonquian language family.

== Economic development ==
The tribe owns and operates the Golden Eagle Casino, buffet, and snack bar, located in Horton, Kansas. The tribe also runs a successful farm and ranch.

== History ==
"Kickapoo" comes from their word "Kiwigapawa," which roughly translates into "he moves from here to there." The tribe is part of the central Algonquian group and has close ethnic and linguistic connections with the Sac and Fox. The Kickapoo were first recorded in history in about 1667–70 at the confluence of the Fox and Wisconsin Rivers. Under pressure from the Menominee, the Kickapoo and their allies moved south and west into southern Michigan, northern Iowa, Ohio and Illinois. A treaty dated June 7, 1803 between the U.S. Government and the Delaware, Shawnee, Potawatomi, Miami, Eel River, Wea, Kickapoo, Piankeshaw, and Kaskaskia tribes occupying the country drained by the Ohio, Wabash and Miami Rivers and a subsequent treaty dated August 7, 1803 ceded lands previously granted in the Treaty of Greenville in 1795 by General Anthony Wayne, and Fort Wayne and Vincennes, Indiana. By these treaties and succeeding treaties in 1809, 1815, 1816, 1819, and 1820 the tribe ceded all their lands on the Wabash, White and Vermilion Rivers and moved into Missouri on the Osage River.

A mere decade later, in 1832, the tribe ceded their lands in Missouri and were granted a "permanent" home south of the Delaware Nation in Kansas near Fort Leavenworth. Around the same time as the Kickapoo moved into Kansas, some of them went to Texas, invited to settle there by the Spanish colonial governor to serve as a buffer between Mexico and American expansionists. The Mexican War of Independence and the Texas Revolution proved that the tide of settlers would not be stopped by the few hundred Kickapoo. At the conclusion of the Texas Revolution, these groups moved south into Mexico. In 1854 the eastern portion of the Kansas lands was ceded to the United States leaving the Kickapoo the western 150,000 acres (610 km^{2}). Two provisions of this treaty were to have long-lasting effects on the tribe. The treaty authorized a survey of the Kickapoo lands which could be used as the basis for fee simple allotment and it granted a railroad right-of-way across the reservation.

Using these two clauses as a basis, the local agent, William Badger, convinced the Commissioner of Indian Affairs Charles E. Mix that the Kickapoo were desirous of having their lands allotted. Considering that the tribe had always held their lands in common, it is unlikely that the tribe truly wanted allotment. However, in light of Badger's persuasion, Mix directed that allotment proceed if 1) the Indians paid for the costs of surveying and allotting the land, 2) 80 acres (32 ha) was allotted to each head of household, and 3) any lands remaining after allotment of the Kansas Kickapoo be reserved for resettlement of the Mexican Kickapoo. Holding the lands not allotted for the Southern Kickapoo, was not in the interests of the railroad and Badger began pressuring tribal members for allotment. Though they complained, it was a political election, not the tribal issues with their agent, that removed Badger from office and replaced him with his brother-in-law Charles B. Keith in 1861.

Keith was a political ally of Senator Samuel C. Pomeroy, the president of the Atchison and Pike's Peak Railroad, the central section of the Transcontinental railroad, which had been formed in 1859. The railroad wanted to gain the right-of-way across the Kickapoo Reservation and title to any surplus lands when the reservation was allotted. Pomeroy and Keith both met with and wrote letters to Commissioner Mix urging allotment and by 1862, a treaty was again made with the Kickapoo. June 28, 1862 agreement allowed for Chiefs to receive 320 acres (130 ha), heads of households to receive 160 acres (65 ha), and all other tribe members to get 40 acres (16 ha), with the bulk of the remaining 125,000 acres (510 km^{2}) to be sold to the railroad. Those who chose not to accept allotment could continue to hold their lands in common until such time as an arrangement could be made to locate a new reserve in Oklahoma, i.e. Indian Territory, and any Southern Kickapoo had one year to return to Kansas and take up their allotment, or it would be forfeit. When news of the treaty's approval broke, protest erupted.

The Kickapoo indicated that they were unaware that the agreement had been reached and thought that they were still negotiating terms. The Kansas Attorney General, Warren William Guthrie, launched a grand jury hearing. The charges were considered serious enough that allotment was suspended and the new Commissioner of Indian Affairs, William P. Dole, appointed in 1863, traveled to Kansas to investigate. In the ensuing hearings, it was alleged that Guthrie's real interest in the matter stemmed from his involvement with rival railroad Hannibal and St. Joseph. Dole returned to Washington, D.C., and submitted his report to President Abraham Lincoln on April 4, 1864. Some of the frustrated Kickapoo decided to leave Kansas, and a group of about 700 headed for Mexico to join kinsmen there in September 1864. In 1865, pressure from Pomeroy finally gained approval to continue with the Kickapoo allotment, although the tribe resisted. By 1869, only 93 Kickapoo had accepted fee simple allotment, the remainder preferring to continue holding their lands in common.

With the enactment of the Dawes Act (February 8, 1887) and its subsequent renewals, another push toward allotting the Kansas Kickapoo began, though the Kickapoo continued to resist. A total of 237 allotments were assigned to the Kickapoo, of which all but 75 were no longer in tribal hands by 1938.

== Twentieth century ==
As the years after World War I came to a close, the seeming prosperity which had existed, evaporated in the Great Depression. A false sense of Native American prosperity based on glowing reports and images of fancily costumed Indians, caused many to reject the dire need that developed for aid. In addition to the economic issues, Kansas was in the midst of a severe drought, known as the Dust Bowl. Temperatures topped 100 °F (38 °C) throughout the summer months of the mid-1930s, and in 1936 Kansas experienced the second hottest year on record. The reservation wells dried up, livestock had to be sold or given away as there was no way to hydrate them, gardens, which had been the main food source, withered. Kansas officials refused to provide welfare assistance to Native people, claiming inadequate funds, and federal programs to provide assistance to Indians were consistently delayed or blocked. The Kickapoo Agent George G. Wren reported destitution and near starvation in 1933 and 1934, alleviated only by the tribe's ability to help each other and work projects offered by the Indian Service.

Location of the Kickapoo Reservation and the Sac and Fox Nation Trust Land joint-use area in Kansas

=== Indian Reorganization Act ===
The Wheeler-Howard Act, also known as the Indian Reorganization Act, was passed by Congress on June 18, 1934, with the aim of increasing native tribes' self-governance and decreasing federal control over Indian affairs. The tribe created a government under the Indian Reorganization Act, adopting a Constitution and By-Laws, which established procedures for election of the Kickapoo Tribal Council. The Constitution, ratified on January 23, 1937 (by a 70-8 vote), provided for a Chairman, Vice-Chairman, Secretary, Treasurer, and three Councilmen.

=== Claims Commission ===
On August 13, 1946 the Indian Claims Commission Act of 1946, Pub. L. No. 79-726, ch. 959, passed. Its purpose was to settle for all time any outstanding grievances or claims the tribes might have against the U.S. for treaty breaches, unauthorized taking of land, dishonorable or unfair dealings, or inadequate compensation. Claims had to be filed within a five-year period, and most of the 370 complaints that were submitted were filed at the approach of the 5-year deadline in August 1951.

At least 6 claims were filed by the Kickapoo Tribe of Kansas with the Claims Commission – some on their own behalf, and some in conjunction with the Kickapoo Tribe of Oklahoma or other tribes with which they had made joint treaties with the U. S. Government. The two largest awards were for "unconscionable consideration" (the government severely underpaid for ceded lands) from the Treaty of 1854 and the Treaty of 1866. Though the distribution was approved via passage of Public Law 92-467 in 1972, appeals were pending into the late 1970s, as the government was offsetting the amounts awarded to the Oklahoma and Kansas Kickapoo, by the expenses incurred in capturing and relocating Mexican Kickapoo during the Texas Revolution. The U.S. government had repatriated some of the Mexican Kickapoos to a reservation in Oklahoma and a later group to Kansas in the 1860s and 1870s. The final distribution plan was not approved until 1980.

=== Threats of termination ===
During the period from the 1940s – 1960s, in which the Indian termination policy was enforced, four Kansas tribes, including the Kickapoo were targeted for termination. One of the first pieces of legislation enacted during this period was the Kansas Act of 1940 which transferred all jurisdiction for crimes committed on or against Indians from federal jurisdiction to the State of Kansas. It did not preclude the federal government from trying native people, but it allowed the state into an area of law in which had historically belonged only to the federal government.

On August 1, 1953, the U.S. Congress passed House Concurrent Resolution 108 which called for the immediate termination of the Flathead, Klamath, Menominee, Potawatomi, and Turtle Mountain Chippewa, as well as all tribes in the states of California, New York, Florida, and Texas. Termination of a tribe meant the immediate withdrawal of all federal aid, services, and protection, as well as the end of reservations. A memo issued by the Department of the Interior on January 21, 1954 clarified that the reference to "Potawatomi" in the Resolution meant the Potawatomi, the Kickapoo Tribe in Kansas, the Sac and Fox and the Iowa tribes in Kansas.

Because jurisdiction over criminal matters had already been transferred to the State of Kansas by the passage of the Kansas Act of 1940, the government targeted the four tribes in Kansas for immediate termination. In February 1954, joint hearings for the Kansas tribes were held by the House and Senate Subcommittees on Indian Affairs.

The Prairie Band of Potawatomi Nation tribal leader, Minnie Evans (Indian name: Ke-waht-no-quah Wish-Ken-O) led the effort to stop termination. Tribal members sent petitions of protest to the government and multiple delegations went to testify at congressional meetings in Washington, D.C. Tribal Council members Vestana Cadue, Oliver Kahbeah, and Ralph Simon of the Kickapoo Tribe in Kansas traveled at their own expense to testify as well. The strong opposition from the Potawatomi and Kickapoo tribes helped them, as well as the Sac & Fox and the Iowa Tribe, avoid termination.

=== 1960s to 1980s ===
The tribe struggled with high unemployment and social issues from the 1950s through the 1980s, facing economic, medical and educational challenges. Government funding, which became available with the Indian Self-Determination and Education Assistance Act of 1975, and the final distribution of their claims with the Indian Claims Commission, allowed the Kansas Kickapoo to construct homes for seniors and single families; build a gymnasium, day care center, and senior center; and repurchase 2,400 acres (9.7 km^{2}) to build a farming and ranching enterprise. They were also able to build a Kickapoo Nation school which serves grades K–12. Most tribal members worked for the tribal enterprises or the local BIA but unemployment remained high and reached a crisis between 1980 and 1982 when it rose to 93%.

=== Gaming ===
In 1992, the tribe signed an agreement with the Governor of Kansas to build a casino in Hiawatha, Kansas, although the state legislature opposed the project. Negotiations continued with legislators and in 1995, the Kansas legislature established a State Gaming Agency. In 1996 the legislature adopted the Tribal Gaming Oversight Act, which established a regulatory board, funded by the tribes of Kansas.

On May 18, 1996, the Kickapoo Tribe opened the Golden Eagle Casino, the first casino in Kansas, on the Kickapoo Reservation. The casino has brought more than 300 jobs to the town of Horton, Kansas and generated revenues that have helped support the tribe's initiatives for schools and health care.
