= Sac and Fox Nation of Missouri in Kansas and Nebraska =

Sauk and Meskwaki tribe based in Kansas

Nîmahâhaki (Meskwaki)
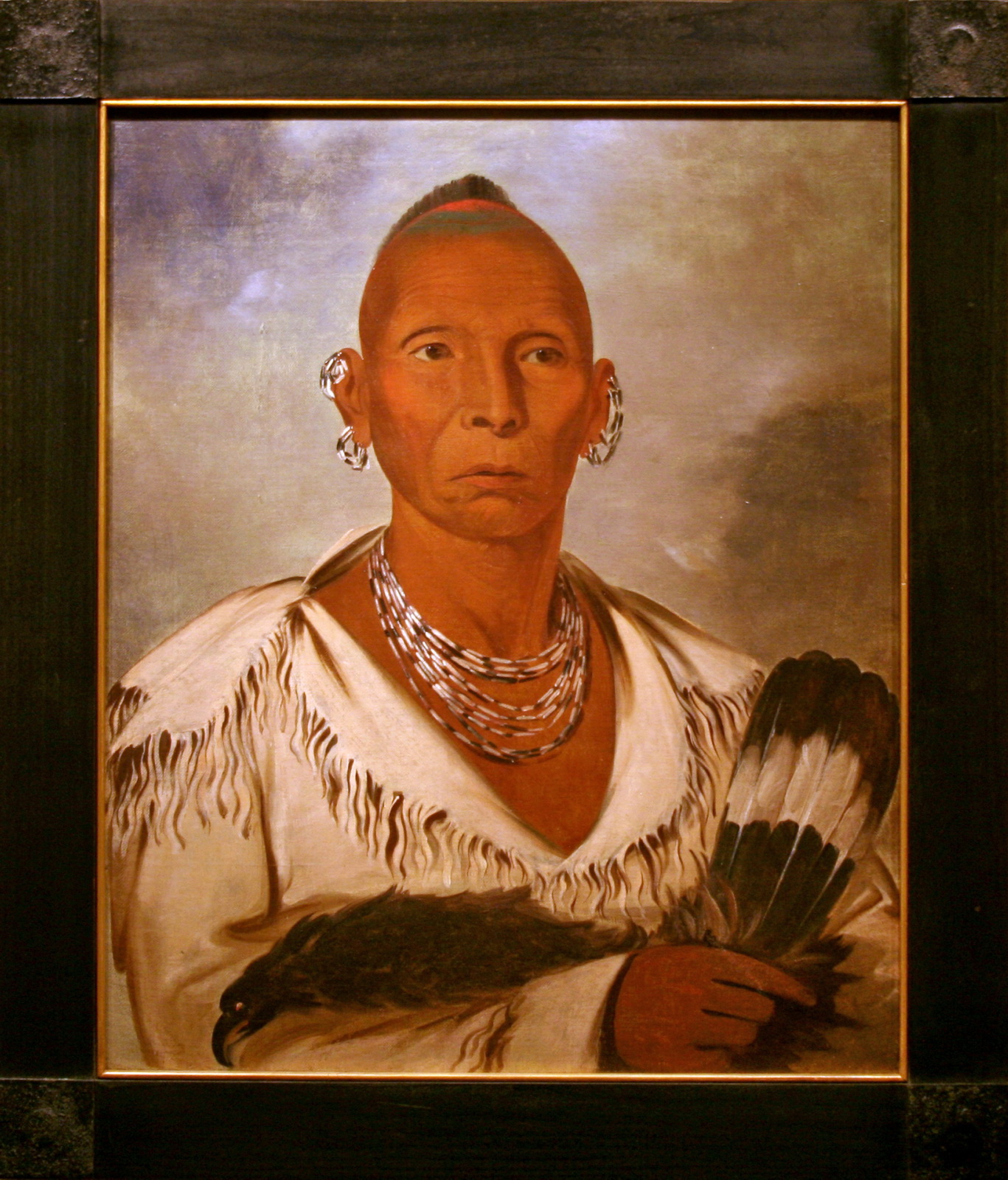
- Black Hawk, portrait by George Catlin, 1832

Total population
- 442

Regions with significant populations
- United States ( Kansas and Nebraska)

Languages
- English, Sauk, Fox

Religion
- Christianity, other

Related ethnic groups
- Sauk, Meskwaki, Kickapoo, and other Algonquian peoples

The Sac and Fox Nation of Missouri in Kansas and Nebraska is one of three federally recognized Native American tribes of Sauk and Meskwaki (Fox) peoples. Their name for themselves is Nemahahaki (Meskwaki: Nîmahâhaki) and they are an Algonquian people and Eastern Woodland culture.

== Government and economic development ==
The Sac and Fox Nation of Missouri is headquartered in Reserve, Kansas. Their tribal chairperson is Tiauna Carnes.

The Sac and Fox Casino, the Boat Bar, the Chop House steak restaurant, the Deli and the Lodge buffet are all owned by the tribe and located in Powhattan, Kansas.

== Museum ==
The tribe operates the Sac and Fox Nation of Missouri Tribal Museum, located in Reserve, Kansas. Founded in 1996, the museum exhibits tribal regalia and serves as a research center.

== History ==
Original two distinct tribes, the Sac and Fox joined forces during the 18th century to resist attacks by the French. The Sac traditionally referred to themselves as "People of the Yellow Earth," while the Foxes called themselves "Red Earth People."

Over fifty million acres of the Mississippi Valley were ceded to the United States in the Treaty of St Louis of 1804. The five signers were given a small amount of goods, were not the principal chiefs of the Sac or Fox tribal councils, and had apparently been given alcohol and were likely drunk when they signed. The Treaty was thus disputed, including through warfare, for several decades. The Sac and Fox Nation of Missouri was established by an 1815 treaty, and they relocated from Iowa and Illinois to northeastern Missouri. In 1824, they moved again to the Platte Valley. Sac leader, Black Hawk led his people in a war against the United States in 1832. An 1837 treaty relocated the tribe to the Great Nemaha Reservation in Doniphan and Brown counties in Kansas. Noted diplomat Jeffrey Deroine, a formerly enslaved man, served as an interpreter for an 1838 treaty. After several treaties ceded more land, the Dawes Act broke tribal lands into individual allotments.

In the 1880s, 360 members lived on the Sac and Fox Reservation, consisting of a 61.226 km² (23.639 sq mi) tract in southeastern Richardson County, Nebraska and northeastern Brown County, Kansas, near Falls City, Nebraska.

The tribe organized in 1934 under the Indian Reorganization Act. The reservation had a resident population of 217 people at the 2000 census.

During the period from the 1940s - 1960s, in which the Indian termination policy was enforced, four Kansas tribes, including the Sac and Fox Nation were targeted for termination. One of the first pieces of legislation enacted during this period was the Kansas Act of 1940 which transferred all jurisdiction for crimes committed on or against Indians from federal jurisdiction to the State of Kansas. It did not preclude the federal government from trying native people, but it allowed the state into an area of law in which had historically belonged only to the federal government.

On 1 August 1953, the US Congress passed House Concurrent Resolution 108 which called for the immediate termination of the Flathead, Klamath, Menominee, Potawatomi, and Turtle Mountain Chippewa, as well as all tribes in the states of California, New York, Florida, and Texas. Termination of a tribe meant the immediate withdrawal of all federal aid, services, and protection, as well as the end of reservations. A memo issued by the Department of the Interior on 21 January 1954 clarified that the reference to "Potawatomi" in the Resolution meant the Potawatomi, the Kickapoo, the Sac and Fox Nation of Missouri in Kansas and Nebraska and the Iowa tribes in Kansas.

Because jurisdiction over criminal matters had already been transferred to the State of Kansas by the passage of the Kansas Act of 1940 the government targeted the four tribes in Kansas for immediate termination. In February, 1954 joint hearings for the Kansas tribes were held by the House and Senate Subcommittees on Indian Affairs.

The Prairie Band of Potawatomi Nation tribal leader, Minnie Evans (Indian name: Ke-waht-no-quah Wish-Ken-O) led the effort to stop termination. Tribal members sent petitions of protest to the government and multiple delegations went to testify at congressional meetings in Washington, DC. Tribal Council members Vestana Cadue, Oliver Kahbeah, and Ralph Simon of the Kickapoo Tribe in Kansas traveled at their own expense to testify as well. The strong opposition from the Potawatomi and Kickapoo tribes helped them, as well as the Sac & Fox and the Iowa Tribe, avoid termination.

== See also ==
- Sac and Fox Nation, Oklahoma
- Sac and Fox Tribe of the Mississippi in Iowa
