= Iowa Tribe of Kansas and Nebraska =

One of two federally recognized tribes of Iowa people

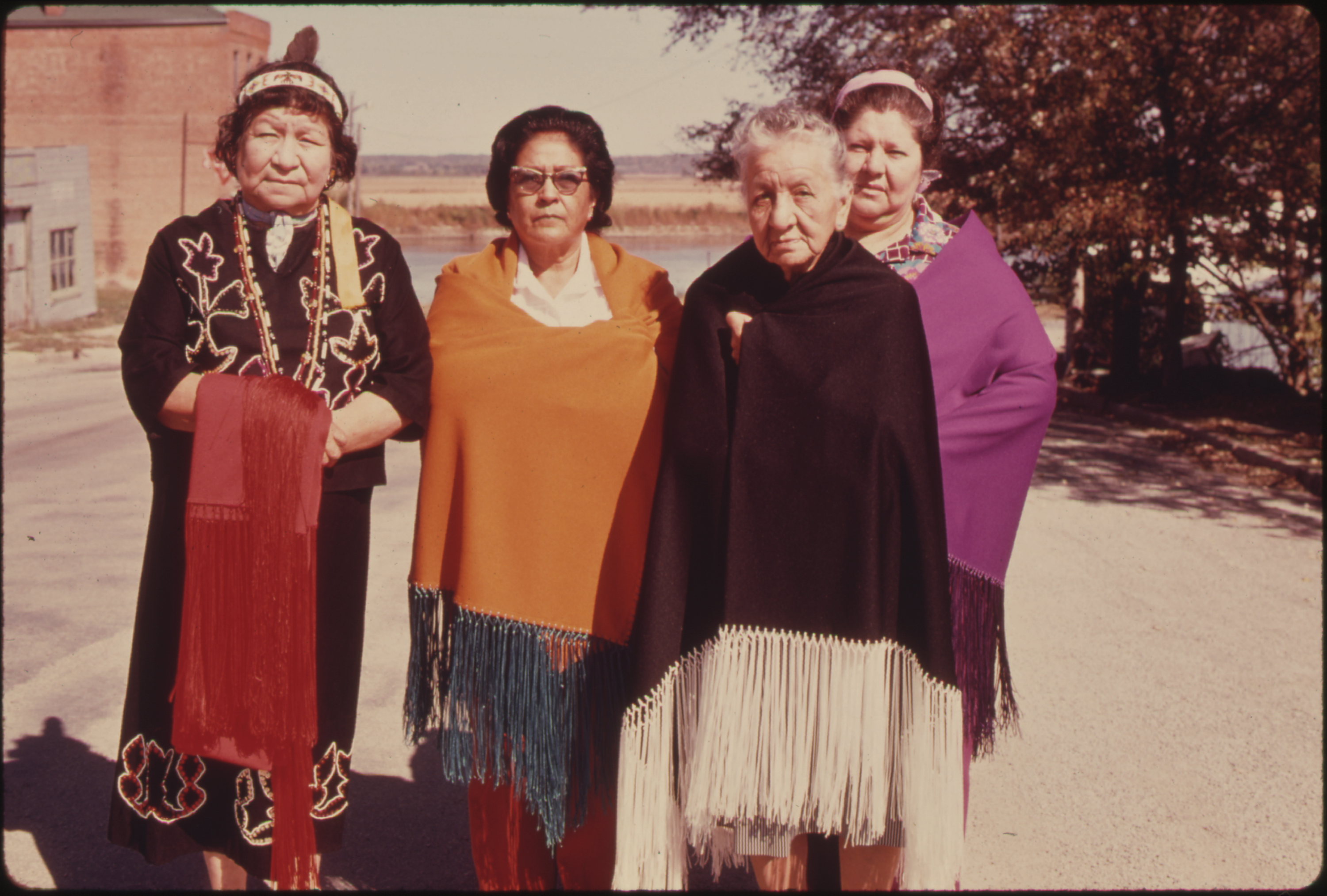
- Four Iowa women in White Cloud, Kansas, 1974

Total population
- 2,000 (1990s)

Regions with significant populations
- United States (Kansas and Nebraska)

Languages
- English, Iowa

Religion
- traditional tribal religion, Christianity, Native American Church

Related ethnic groups
- other Iowa people, Otoe, Missoria

The Iowa Tribe of Kansas and Nebraska is one of two federally recognized tribes of Iowa people. The other is the Iowa Tribe of Oklahoma.

They hold an annual powwow every September.

== Reservation ==
The Iowa Reservation is located in Richardson County in southeastern Nebraska and Brown and Doniphan Counties in northeastern Kansas. It spans 1,500 acres (6.1 km^{2}) of checkerboard lands, alternating between tribal and non-Native ownership.

== Government ==
The Iowa Tribe of Kansas and Nebraska is headquartered in White Cloud, Kansas. The tribe is governed by a five-member council. The current administration is as follows.

- Chairperson: Missty Slater
- Vice-chairperson: James Keller
- Treasurer: Robert Hullman
- Secretary: Tony Fee
- Council Member: Nathan Popejoy.

== Economic development ==
The tribe owns and operates a dairy farm, fuel station, grain processing operation, Casino White Cloud, and the Mahuska Restaurant, located in White Cloud, Kansas.

== History ==
A Chiwere Siouan language-speaking people, the Iowa originally lived near the Great Lakes and were once part of the Ho-Chunk Nation. In the 17th century, Iowa people lived in northern Iowa and southern Minnesota. During the 1820s and 1830s, the tribe signed numerous treaties with the US federal government and were assigned a reservation near the Great Nemaha River near the Kansas–Nebraska border in 1836.

In the 1870s, the tribe split into two groups, and the Southern Ioway moved to Indian Territory, while the Northern Ioway remained in Kansas and Nebraska. The Northern Ioway ratified their constitution and by-laws on 26 February 1937.

During the period from the 1940s to the 1960s, in which the Indian termination policy was enforced, four Kansas tribes, including the Iowa, were targeted for termination. One of the first pieces of legislation enacted during this period was the Kansas Act of 1940 which transferred all jurisdiction for crimes committed on or against Indians from federal jurisdiction to the State of Kansas. It did not preclude the federal government from trying Native people, but it allowed the state into an area of law in which had historically belonged only to the federal government.

On 1 August 1953, the United States Congress passed House Concurrent Resolution 108 which called for the immediate termination of the Flathead, Klamath, Menominee, Potawatomi, and Turtle Mountain Chippewa, as well as all tribes in the states of California, New York, Florida, and Texas. Termination of a tribe meant the immediate withdrawal of all federal aid, services, and protection, as well as the end of reservations. A memo issued by the Department of the Interior on 21 January 1954 clarified that the reference to "Potawatomi" in the Resolution meant the Potawatomi, the Kickapoo, the Sac and Fox, and the Iowa Tribe of Kansas and Nebraska tribes in Kansas.

Because jurisdiction over criminal matters had already been transferred to the State of Kansas by the passage of the Kansas Act of 1940, the government targeted the four tribes in Kansas for immediate termination. In February 1954, joint hearings for the Kansas tribes were held by the House and Senate Subcommittees on Indian Affairs.

The Prairie Band of Potawatomi Nation tribal leader, Minnie Wishkeno Evans (Indian name: Ke-wat-no-quah) led the effort to stop termination. Tribal members sent petitions of protest to the government and multiple delegations went to testify at congressional meetings in Washington, DC. Tribal Council members Vestana Cadue, Oliver Kahbeah, and Ralph Simon of the Kickapoo Tribe in Kansas traveled at their own expense to testify as well. The strong opposition from the Potawatomi and Kickapoo tribes helped them, as well as the Sac and Fox and the Iowa Tribe, avoid termination.

In 2021 Johnson County, IA Conservation Board donated 7 acres of land to the Iowa Tribe of Nebraska and Kansas. The first land owned by the Iowa Tribe in Iowa (Article).

== 21st century ==
In March 2016, the Iowa Tribe of Kansas and Nebraska filed a motion to consult with the Iowa Utilities Board (IUB) regarding their permit for Dakota Energy to build the Bakken pipeline, which will run through the tribe's ancestral lands. The IUB tentatively denied this motion.

== See also ==
- Meskwaki
