= Kansas Act of 1940 =

US federal law

The Kansas Act of 1940 addressed the means by which Congress could use its power under the Indian Commerce Clause to authorize a state's ability to exercise jurisdiction in certain instances. Because the inherent sovereignty of Indian nations generally precluded state jurisdiction over Indian country, the Act became one of the first legislative actions to permit state jurisdiction over most offenses committed by or against Indians on Indian reservations. This was a departure from previous federal policy in which the Federal Government had sole jurisdiction over Indians. The Act was a precursor to the Indian termination policy and in essence was a kind of "trial legislation" to see if such transfers would be effective. Several other states followed suit. Today, the jurisdictional gap which existed when the Kansas Act was passed no longer exists, and instead there is an overlap; a native person committing a single crime within Indian country in the state of Kansas could be prosecuted by the United States, the State of Kansas, and one of the tribes.

== Background ==
In March 1938, Potawatomi Agency Superintendent Bruce contacted federal legislators from Kansas and proposed a bill for Kansas to obtain jurisdiction over criminal cases on Indian lands in Kansas. There was a perception that because, at that time, none of the four tribes — Potawatomi, Kickapoo, Sac and Fox, Iowa — had tribal courts to deal with offenses, lawlessness would prevail if the state were not allowed jurisdiction over crimes that were not federal offenses. In addition, because of the allotment program, approximately 80,000 acres (320 km^{2}) of Indian land had been assigned to tribal members and were in state jurisdiction, while only about 35,000 acres (140 km^{2}) of Indian land were held in the federal trust.

Bruce cited six reasons the Federal Government might support the transfer:

- Lack of tribal courts;
- Institutionalized tribe members in Jackson and Brown counties were paid for by the county, not Indian Services;
- The majority of land owned by tribal members was not part of federal jurisdiction;
- Borderline cases could result in obstruction of justice with overlapping jurisdictions;
- Tribal support; and
- Expense and inconvenience of traveling to federal courts would be eliminated.

Up until this time, Kansas had exercised jurisdiction over offenses, including those listed in the Indian Major Crimes Act, but when that authority was called into question, the state sought clarification of its authority. Accordingly, the stated purpose of the act was to "merely confirm a relationship which the State has willingly assumed, which the Indians have willingly accepted, and which has produced successful results, over a considerable period of years."

It is unclear if Bruce exerted influence on the tribes to accept a complete transfer to state jurisdiction, or if the tribes proposed it to Bruce, but within a short time frame, all four tribes passed resolutions to transfer criminal jurisdiction on Indian lands to state courts from federal courts. The Kickapoo resolution was dated February 24, 1938, the Sac & Fox and Iowa resolutions were dated March 1, 1938 and the Potawatomi resolution was dated March 4, 1938.

Within days of the adoption of the tribal resolutions, United States Representative William P. Lambertson introduced House Resolution 9757, "A bill to relinquish jurisdiction to the State of Kansas to prosecute Indians or others for offenses committed on Indian reservations." Within two years, this bill would lead to the Kansas Act of 1940.

The 1938 version of the bill would have given Kansas state authorities exclusive jurisdiction over criminal offenses occurring on reservations, prevented federal prosecution and punishment of major crimes in Indian country, and prevented the Federal Government from asserting authority within Kansas under the General Crimes Act.

== Enactment ==
On January 5, 1939, House Resolution 3048 and Senate Bill 372 were introduced and lawmakers were advised that the proposal was supported by the Indian tribes. This may not have been the case with all of the tribes as both telegrams and letters indicate that correspondence between Potawatomi Business Council Chairman Wahbnosah and Representative W. Rogers shows the Potawatomi were objecting. The correspondence is not part of the legislative record, but instead housed in the National Archives and may or may not have been brought to the attention of the rest of the Congress. However, it is significant, as one of the letters points out that, "The Business Committee of the Prairie Band Potawatomi tribe of Indians represents eleven-hundred of the sixteen-hundred Indians of Kansas," which means that the majority of native people were not in favor of passage.

The 1938 text of the law had proposed relinquishment of "concurrent jurisdiction" by the federal government to the Kansas State government. This text was deleted by Congress as was its reference to the Indian Major Crimes Act. The changes were provided to make clear that the statute conferred to Kansas jurisdiction over more offenses than were subject to federal jurisdiction and to acknowledge, more generally, rather than listing specific citations, that the Act did not eliminate federal jurisdiction over offenses defined by federal law.

In the case of Negonsott v. Samuels, 507 U. S. 99 (1993), United States Supreme Court Chief Justice William Rehnquist affirmed the intent of the law was "that federal courts shall retain their jurisdiction to try all offenses subject to federal jurisdiction, while Kansas courts shall have jurisdiction to try persons for the same conduct when it violates state law."

On June 8, 1940, the bill was passed as Title 25 U.S. Code § 217a ch. 276, 54 Stat. 249. The Title 25 section was repealed and amended on 25 June 1948 to become part of the Crimes and Criminal Code statutes rather than Indians statutes. It is currently known as Title 18 U.S. Code § 3243 ch. 211, 62 Stat. 827.

The Act was a precursor to the Indian termination policy and in essence was a kind of "test law," to see if such transfers would be effective. In a letter from Superintendent H.E. Bruce, of the Potawatomi Agency to U.S. Senator Arthur Capper dated 29 May 1940, Bruce wrote:

... that the Indian Office in Washington is planning to recommend similar legislation for Indian areas in other states when the plan has been tried out in Kansas. ... Based upon 27 years of Indian field experience, it is my conviction that a similar law and order setup is definitely needed over a large section of the Indian country.

— Superintendent H.E. Bruce, Letter to Senator Arthur Capper, 29 May 1940.

== Effects ==
The Kansas Act of 1940 was followed by virtually identical statutes granting jurisdiction to North Dakota and Iowa for prosecuting offenses within their state borders committed by or against Indians on certain reservations and in 1948 to the state of New York. The primary difference in the New York statute was the protection of traditional hunting and fishing rights to tribal members which might be protected by treaty or agreement.

The fact that state jurisdiction over most matters had occurred previous to the passage of the House concurrent resolution 108 issued 1 August 1953 was one of the reasons for including the New York, Kansas and North Dakota Indians in those marked for immediate termination.

== Current implications ==
All four tribes within Kansas now hear both civil and criminal cases in their tribal court systems. All judges, prosecutors, and public defenders are members of state bar associations. The jurisdictional gap which existed when the Kansas Act was passed no longer exists. In fact, now an overlap occurs. A native person committing a single crime within Indian country, in the state of Kansas, could be prosecuted by the United States, the State of Kansas, and one of the tribes.
