= House concurrent resolution 108 =

1953 US congressional resolution

House Concurrent Resolution 108 (H. Con. Res. 108), passed August 1, 1953, declared it to be the sense of Congress that it should be policy of the United States government to abolish federal supervision over American Indian tribes as soon as possible and to subject the Indians to the same laws, privileges, and responsibilities as other U.S. citizens. This includes an end to reservations and tribal sovereignty, integrating Native Americans into mainstream American society.

The consequence of H. Con. Res. 108 was the beginning of an era of termination policy, in which the federally recognized status of many Native American tribes was revoked, ending the government responsibility to tribe members and withdrawing legal protection to territory, culture, and religion.

H. Con. Res. 108 was passed concurrently with Public Law 280, which granted state jurisdiction over civil and criminal offenses committed by or upon Native Americans in Indian Territory in the states of California, Minnesota, Wisconsin, Oregon, and Nebraska, all of which have large Indigenous populations.

H. Con. Res. foreshadowed the "Termination" policies and congressional pushes of the late 1950s.

== See also ==
- Indian termination policy
