= List of casinos in California =

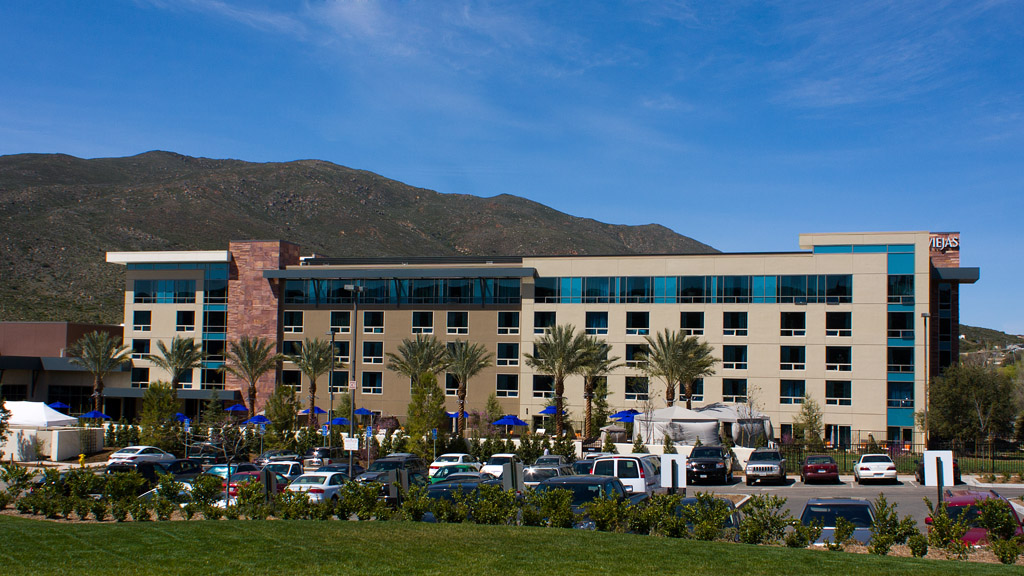
Viejas Casino in Alpine, California

This is a list of casinos in California.

== List of casinos ==
List of casinos in the U.S. state of California
Casino	City	County	State	District	Type	Comments
Agua Caliente Casino Palm Springs	Palm Springs	Riverside	California		Native American	Owned by the Agua Caliente Band of Cahuilla Indians
Agua Caliente Casino Rancho Mirage	Rancho Mirage	Riverside	California		Native American	Owned by the Agua Caliente Band of Cahuilla Indians
Agua Caliente Casino Cathedral City	Cathedral City	Riverside	California		Native American	Owned by the Agua Caliente Band of Cahuilla Indians
Augustine Casino	Rancho Mirage	Riverside	California		Native American	Owned by the Augustine Band of Cahuilla Indians
Barona Casino	Lakeside	San Diego	California		Native American	Owned by the Barona Group of Capitan Grande Band of Mission Indians
Bear River Casino	Loleta	Humboldt	California		Native American	Owned by the Bear River Band of the Rohnerville Rancheria
Black Oak Casino	Tuolumne	Tuolumne	California		Native American	Owned by the Tuolumne Band of Me-Wuk Indians
Blue Lake Casino	Blue Lake	Humboldt	California		Native American	Owned by the Blue Lake Rancheria
Cache Creek Casino Resort	Brooks	Yolo	California		Native American	Owned by the Yocha Dehe Wintun Nation
Cahuilla Casino	Anza	Riverside	California		Native American	Owned by the Cahuilla Band of Indians
Casino Pauma	Pauma Valley	San Diego	California		Native American	Owned by Pauma Band of Luiseno Mission Indians
Cher-Ae Heights Bingo and Casino	Trinidad	Humboldt	California		Native American	Owned by the Cher-Ae Heights Indian Community of the Trinidad Rancheria
Chicken Ranch Bingo and Casino	Jamestown	Tuolumne	California		Native American	Owned by the Chicken Ranch Rancheria of Me-Wuk Indians of California
Chukchansi Gold Resort & Casino	Coarsegold	Madera	California		Native American	Owned by the Picayune Rancheria of Chukchansi Indians
Chumash Casino Resort	Santa Ynez	Santa Barbara	California		Native American	Owned by the Santa Ynez Band of Chumash Mission Indians
Colusa Casino Resort	Colusa	Colusa	California		Native American	Owned by the Colusa Indian Community
Coyote Valley Casino	Redwood Valley	Mendocino	California		Native American	Owned by the Coyote Valley Band of Pomo Indians – formerly known as Shodakai Casino
Desert Rose Casino	Alturas	Modoc	California		Native American	Owned by the Alturas Indian Rancheria
Diamond Mountain Casino	Susanville	Lassen	California		Native American	Owned by the Susanville Indian Rancheria
Eagle Mountain Casino	Porterville	Tulare	California		Native American	Owned by the Tule River Indian Tribe of the Tule River Reservation
Elk Valley Casino	Crescent City	Del Norte	California		Native American	Owned by the Elk Valley Rancheria
Fantasy Springs Resort and Casino	Indio	Riverside	California		Native American	Owned by the Cabazon Band of Cahuilla Indians
Feather Falls Casino	Oroville	Butte	California		Native American	Owned by the Mooretown Rancheria of Maidu Indians
Gold Country Casino and Hotel	Oroville	Butte	California		Native American	Owned by the Berry Creek Rancheria of Maidu Indians of California
Golden Acorn Casino	Campo	San Diego	California		Native American	Owned by the Campo Kumeyaay Nation
Graton Resort & Casino	Rohnert Park	Sonoma	California		Native American	Owned by the Federated Indians of Graton Rancheria
Hard Rock Hotel & Casino Sacramento at Fire Mountain	Wheatland	Yuba	California		Native American	Owned by the Estom Yumeka Maidu Tribe of the Enterprise Rancheria
Harrah's Northern California	Ione	Amador	California		Native American	Owned by the Buena Vista Rancheria of Me-Wuk Indians of California
Harrah's Resort Southern California	Valley Center	San Diego	California		Native American	Owned by the Rincon Band of Luiseño Indians
Havasu Landing Resort and Casino	Havasu Lake	San Bernardino	California		Native American	Owned by the Chemehuevi Indian Tribe of the Chemehuevi Reservation
Jackson Rancheria Casino	Jackson	Amador	California		Native American	Owned by the Jackson Band of Miwuk Indians
Jamul Casino	Jamul	San Diego	California		Native American	Owned by the Jamul Indian Village
Konocti Vista Casino and Bingo	Finley	Lake	California		Native American	Owned by the Big Valley Band of Pomo Indians of the Big Valley Rancheria
La Jolla Slot Arcade	Pauma Valley	San Diego	California		Native American	Defunct – formerly owned by the La Jolla Band of Luiseño Indians; closed in August 2004
La Posta Casino	Boulevard	San Diego	California		Native American	Defunct – formerly owned by the La Posta Band of Diegueño Mission Indians
Lucky 7 Casino	Smith River	Del Norte	California		Native American	Owned by the Tolowa Dee-niʼ Nation
Lucky Bear Casino	Hoopa	Humboldt	California		Native American	Owned by the Hoopa Valley Tribe
Mono Wind Casino	Auberry	Fresno	California		Native American	Owned by the Big Sandy Rancheria of Western Mono Indians
Morongo Casino, Resort & Spa	Cabazon	Riverside	California		Native American	Owned by the Morongo Band of Mission Indians
Pala Casino Resort and Spa	Pala	San Diego	California		Native American	Owned by the Pala Band of Mission Indians
Pechanga Resort and Casino	Temecula	Riverside	California		Native American	Owned by the Pechanga Band of Indians
Pit River Casino	Burney	Shasta	California		Native American	Owned by the Pit River Tribe
Quechan Resort Casino	Winterhaven	Imperial	California		Native American	Owned by the Quechan Tribe of the Fort Yuma Indian Reservation
Rain Rock Casino	Yreka	Siskiyou	California		Native American	Owned by the Karuk Tribe
Red Earth Casino	Salton City	Imperial	California		Native American	Owned by the Torres Martinez Desert Cahuilla Indians
Red Fox Casino	Laytonville	Mendocino	California		Native American	Owned by the Cahto Indian Tribe of the Laytonville Rancheria
Redhawk Casino	Shingle Springs	El Dorado	California		Native American	Owned by the Shingle Springs Band of Miwok Indians
River Rock Casino	Geyserville	Sonoma	California		Native American	Owned by the Dry Creek Rancheria Band of Pomo Indians
Robinson Rancheria Resort and Casino	Nice	Lake	California		Native American	Owned by the Robinson Rancheria of Pomo Indians of California
Rolling Hills Casino	Corning	Tehama	California		Native American	Owned by the Paskenta Band of Nomlaki Indians
San Pablo Lytton Casino	San Pablo	Contra Costa	California		Native American	Owned by the Lytton Band of Pomo Indians
Santa Ysabel Resort and Casino	Santa Ysabel	San Diego	California		Native American	Defunct – formerly owned by the Iipay Nation of Santa Ysabel
Sherwood Valley Rancheria Casino	Willits	Mendocino	California		Native American	Owned by the Sherwood Valley Rancheria of Pomo Indians of California – formerly known as Black Bart Casino
Sho-Ka-Wah Casino	Hopland	Mendocino	California		Native American	Defunct – formerly owned by the Hopland Band of Pomo Indians of the Hopland Rancheria
Sky River Casino	Elk Grove	Sacramento	California		Native American	Owned by the Wilton Rancheria
Soboba Casino Resort	San Jacinto	Riverside	California		Native American	Owned by the Soboba Band of Luiseño Indians
Spotlight 29 Casino	Coachella	Riverside	California		Native American	Owned by the Twenty-Nine Palms Band of Mission Indians of California
Sycuan Resort & Casino	El Cajon	San Diego	California		Native American	Owned by the Sycuan Band of the Kumeyaay Nation
Table Mountain Casino	Friant	Fresno	California		Native American	Owned by the Table Mountain Rancheria
Tachi Palace Hotel and Casino	Lemoore	Kings	California		Native American	Owned by the Santa Rosa Indian Community of the Santa Rosa Rancheria
Thunder Valley Casino Resort	Lincoln	Placer	California		Native American	Owned by the United Auburn Indian Community
Tortoise Rock Casino	Twentynine Palms	San Bernardino	California		Native American	Owned by the Twenty-Nine Palms Band of Mission Indians of California
Twin Pine Casino	Middletown	Lake	California		Native American	Owned by the Middletown Rancheria of Pomo Indians of California
Valley View Casino	Valley Center	San Diego	California		Native American	Owned by the San Pasqual Band of Mission Indians
Viejas Casino	Alpine	San Diego	California		Native American	Owned by the Viejas Band of Kumeyaay Indians
Wanaaha Casino	Bishop	Inyo	California		Native American	Owned by the Bishop Paiute Tribe – formerly known as Paiute Palace Casino
Win-River Casino	Redding	Shasta	California		Native American	Owned by the Redding Rancheria
Yaamava' Resort & Casino	Highland	San Bernardino	California		Native American	Owned by the Yuhaaviatam of San Manuel Nation

== List of card rooms ==
Permitted by the state, card rooms are establishments that offers card games for play.

List of card rooms in the U.S. state of California
Casino	City	County	State	District	Type	Comments
The 101 Casino	Petaluma	Sonoma	California		Card room
The 500 Club	Clovis	Fresno	California		Card room
Artichoke Joe's Casino	San Bruno	San Mateo	California		Card room
The Aviator Casino	Delano	Kern	California		Card room
Bankers Casino	Salinas	Monterey	California		Card room
Bay 101	San Jose	Santa Clara	California		Card room
The Bicycle Casino	Bell Gardens	Los Angeles	California		Card room
Black Sheep Casino	Cameron Park	El Dorado	California		Card room
Brooks Oceana Cardroom	Oceano	San Luis Obispo	California		Card room
Bruce's Bar and Casino	Blythe	Riverside	California		Card room
California Grand Casino	Pacheco	Contra Costa	California		Card room
Cameo Club	Stockton	San Joaquin	California		Card room
Capitol Casino	Sacramento	Sacramento	California		Card room
Casino Club	Redding	Shasta	California		Card room
Casino M8trix	San Jose	Santa Clara	California		Card room	formerly known as Garden City Casino
Casino Marysville	Marysville	Yuba	California		Card room
Casino Real	Manteca	San Joaquin	California		Card room
Central Coast Casino - Grover Beach	Grover Beach	San Luis Obispo	California		Card room
Cesar's Club	Watsonville	Santa Cruz	California		Card room
Club One Casino	Fresno	Fresno	California		Card room
Club San Rafael	San Rafael	Marin	California		Card room
Commerce Casino	Commerce	Los Angeles	California		Card room
Comstock Card Room	Tracy	San Joaquin	California		Card room
Crystal Casino and Hotel	Compton	Los Angeles	California		Card room
Delta Club Cardroom	Stockton	San Joaquin	California		Card room
Desert Casino	Adelanto	San Bernardino	California		Card room	Defunct – demolished in 2007
Deuces Wild Casino	Auburn	Placer	California		Card room
Diamond Jim's Casino	Rosamond	Kern	California		Card room
Don Juan Club and Casino	Rancho Cordova	Sacramento	California		Card room
El Resbalon	Woodlake	Tulare	California		Card room
Empire Sportsmen's Association	Modesto	Stanislaus	California		Card room
Garlic City Club	Gilroy	Santa Clara	California		Card room
Gloria's Lounge and Casino	Visalia	Tulare	California		Card room
Gold Rush Gaming Parlor	Grass Valley	Nevada	California		Card room	sold and relocated in 2010 to Towers Casino in Grass Valley
Golden State Casino	Marysville	Yuba	California		Card room
Golden West Casino	Bakersfield	Kern	California		Card room
Hawaiian Gardens Casino	Hawaiian Gardens	Los Angeles	California		Card room
Hollywood Park Casino	Inglewood	Los Angeles	California		Card room
Hotel Del Rio & Casino	Isleton	Sacramento	California		Card room
Hustler Casino	Gardena	Los Angeles	California		Card room
Jalisco Pool Room	Guadalupe	Santa Barbara	California		Card room
Kelly's Cardroom	Antioch	Contra Costa	California		Card room
Kings Cardroom	Stockton	San Joaquin	California		Card room
Klondike Casino	Eureka	Humboldt	California		Card room
La Fuerza	Woodlake	Tulare	California		Card room
Lake Bowl Cardroom	Folsom	Sacramento	California		Card room
Lake Elsinore Hotel & Casino	Lake Elsinore	Riverside	California		Card room
Larry Flynt's Lucky Lady Casino	Gardena	Los Angeles	California		Card room
Limelight Cardroom	Sacramento	Sacramento	California		Card room
Livermore Saloon & Casino	Livermore	Alameda	California		Card room
Lucky Buck Card Club	Livermore	Alameda	California		Card room
Lucky Chances Casino	Colma	San Mateo	California		Card room
Lucky Derby Casino	Citrus Heights	Sacramento	California		Card room
Lucky Lady Card Room	San Diego	San Diego	California		Card room
Marina Club	Marina	Monterey	California		Card room
Merced Poker Room	Merced	Merced	California		Card room
Mike's Card Casino	Oakdale	Stanislaus	California		Card room
The Mint	Porterville	Tulare	California		Card room
Mortimer's Card Room	Marina	Monterey	California		Card room
Napa Valley Casino	American Canyon	Napa	California		Card room
Nineteenth Hole	Antioch	Contra Costa	California		Card room
Oaks Card Club	Emeryville	Alameda	California		Card room
Oasis Card Room	Ridgecrest	Kern	California		Card room
Ocean's Eleven Casino	Oceanside	San Diego	California		Card room
Ocean View Cardroom	Santa Cruz	Santa Cruz	California		Card room
Old Cayucos Tavern	Cayucos	San Luis Obispo	California		Card room
Outlaws Card Parlour	Atascadero	San Luis Obispo	California		Card room
Palace Card Club	Hayward	Alameda	California		Card room
Palomar Card Club	San Diego	San Diego	California		Card room
Paso Robles Casino	Paso Robles	San Luis Obispo	California		Card room
Pastime Club	Benicia	Solano	California		Card room
Pastime Club	Citrus Heights	Sacramento	California		Card room
The Players Club	Ventura	Ventura	California		Card room
Poker Flats Casino	Merced	Merced	California		Card room
Rancho's Club Casino	Rancho Cordova	Sacramento	California		Card room
River Card Room	Petaluma	Sonoma	California		Card room
Rogelio's	Isleton	Sacramento	California		Card room
Royal Flush Casino	Lemoore	Kings	California		Card room
S & K Card Room	Eureka	Humboldt	California		Card room
Silver Fox Card Room	Sacramento	Sacramento	California		Card room
St. Charles Place	Downieville	Sierra	California		Card room
Stones Gambling Hall	Citrus Heights	Sacramento	California		Card room
Sundowner Cardroom	Visalia	Tulare	California		Card room
Towers Casino	Grass Valley	Nevada	California		Card room
Turlock Poker Room	Turlock	Stanislaus	California		Card room
Ven-A-Mexico	Soledad	Monterey	California		Card room
Village Club Casino	Chula Vista	San Diego	California		Card room
Wine Country Casino and Restaurant	Lodi	San Joaquin	California		Card room

== See also ==
- List of casinos in the United States
- Gambling in California
- List of casino hotels
