= BrandAds =

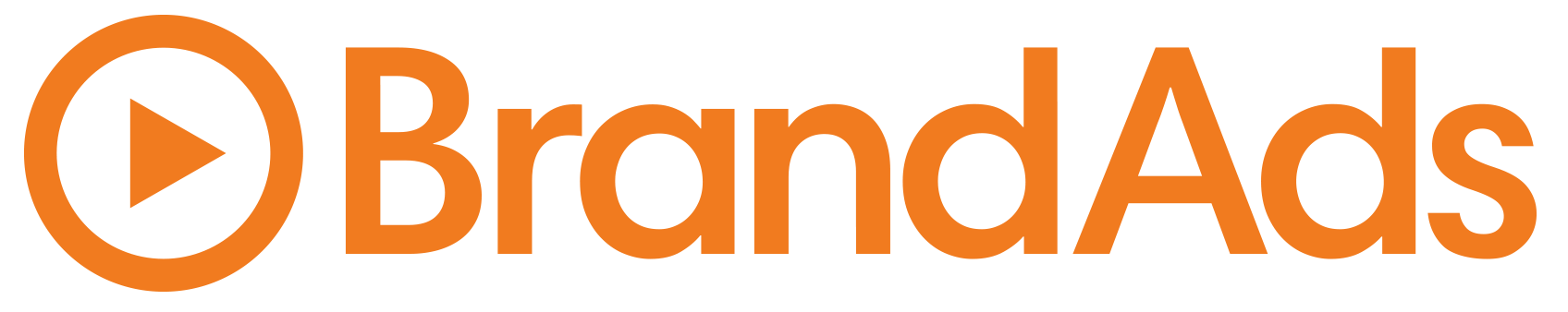
- Company type: Private
- Industry: Advertising
- Founded: 2011
- Headquarters: Emeryville, CA, USA
- Key people: Avi Brown (CEO)
- Products: online video analytics
- Website: http://www.extremereach.com

BrandAds is an online video analytics company based in Emeryville, California. It produces BrandAds Bridge, a tool for advertisers that measures the success of online video campaigns using more than 30 performance metrics such as gross rating point (GRP), viewability, time spent, brand lift by demographic segment, social lift and social sentiment.

== History ==
BrandAds was founded in 2011 by CEO Avi Brown (formerly of native advertising company Sharethrough), Ryan Pamplin and Kandi Onwuama. Brown has stated that the company aims to be proactive as video advertising gains popularity. The company has made efforts to increase transparency in the presentation of statistics. Additionally, their statistics are updated in real-time.

It launched its first product, BrandAds Bridge, in September 2013.

In May 2014, the company was acquired by Extreme Reach, a Needham, MA-based company that provides a video ad distribution platform. The BrandAds brand name was folded into Extreme Reach, and its advertising metrics platform is incorporated as "Real-Time Video Advertising Intelligence."
