= Garden City Casino skimming scandal =

San Jose, California, white-collar crime

Garden City Casino Skimming scandal

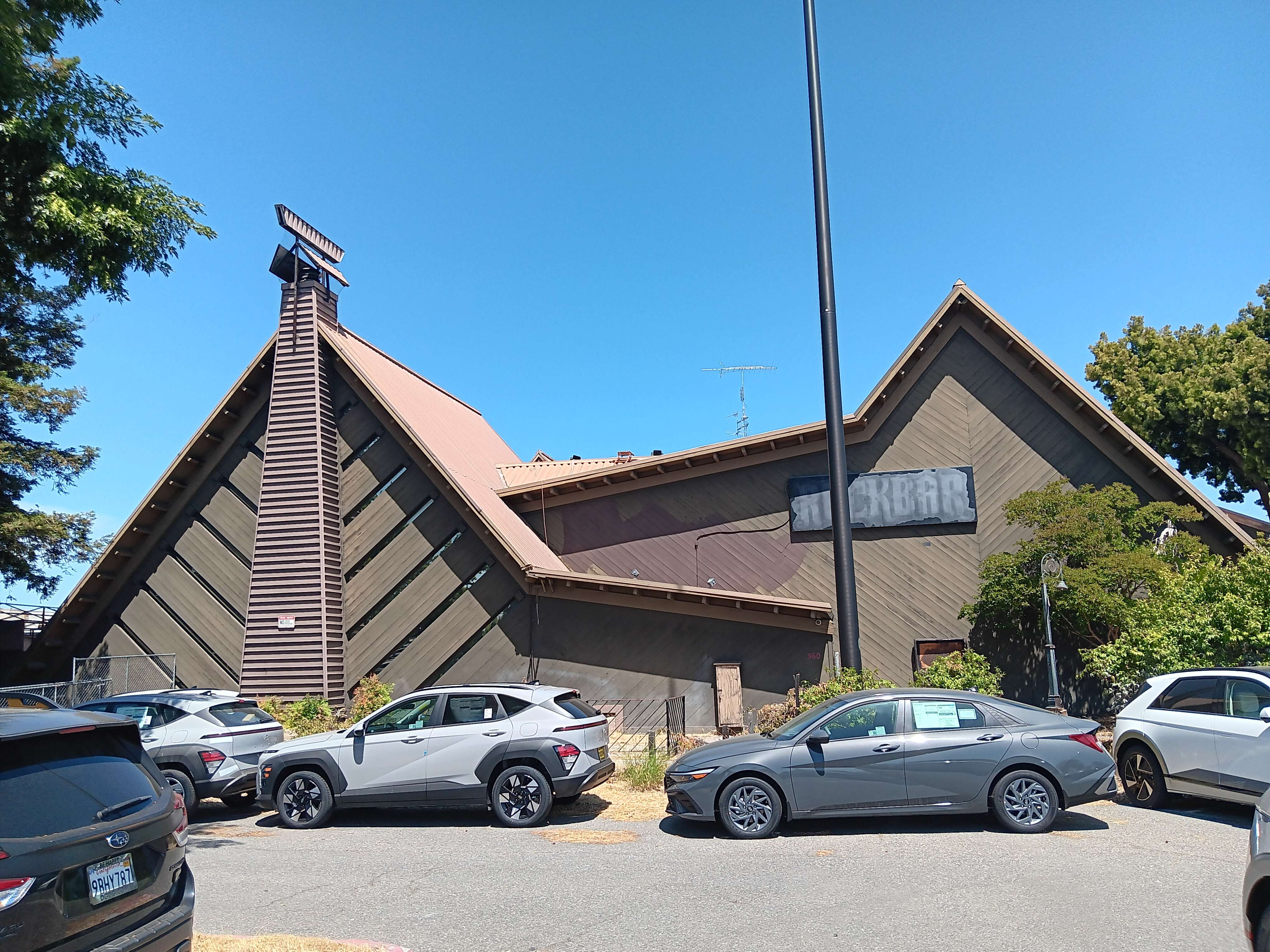
- Former location of Garden City Casino (2025)
- Duration: 1981-1987
- Venue: Superior Court of California for and in the County of Santa Clara
- Location: San Jose, California, U.S.
- Organized by: Garden City Casino Ownership & Employees
- Accused: 14
- Convicted: 12
- Charges: Criminal conspiracy; Conspiracy to commit a crime; Conspiracy to defraud; Conspiracy to violate campaign disclosure laws; Filing false individual state tax returns; Filing fraudulent corporate state tax returns; Perjury

The Garden City Casino Skimming scandal was a six-year-long investigation initially conducted by the Santa Clara County grand jury and the San Jose Police Department and tried in the Santa Clara County superior court between 1981 and 1987 into the skimming perpetrated by twelve Garden City Casino owners and employees. Prosecutors in the Santa Clara County District Attorney's Office unsealed an indictment totaling of 60 felony counts accusing fourteen individuals of criminal conspiracy that included: committing a crime, defraud, violating campaign disclosure laws, filing false tax returns, and perjury. Of those fourteen individuals, twelve pleaded guilty. This scandal was regarded by The Mercury News as "one of the longest-running criminal cases" in Santa Clara County's history.

== Criminal proceedings ==
On May 6, 1987, fourteen employees of Garden City Casino were indicted, by the Santa Clara County grand jury, with sixty total felony counts of Criminal conspiracy, Conspiracy to commit a crime, Conspiracy to defraud, Conspiracy to violate campaign disclosure laws, filing false individual state tax returns, filing fraudulent corporate state tax returns, and perjury. Three of those criminal counts indicted against former president Nicholas J. Dalis, included two counts of attempted grand theft and one count of grand theft. Prosecutors and the San Jose Police Department alleged that the casino skimmed $3.8 million in the last eight years and that the casino owners "reimbursed employees for giving campaign contributions -- a violation of state law". Hours before the arraignment, the California Franchise Tax Board raided the casino and "seized about $200,000 to recover unpaid taxes."

Twelve employees pleaded or were found guilty, and the ownership was barred from renewing their gaming licenses as a result of their criminal convictions. The casino was ordered to, both, pay a $5 million fine and for the convicted owners to sell all their shares by October 1993. Seven out of the twelve employees were sentenced to house arrest and nine out of the twelve defendants were sentenced to community service. All twelve were ordered to pay a total, in fines and restitution and with interest, of $2,171,882. Former president Nicholas J. Dalis was sentenced to three years in state prison and ordered to pay $100,000 in fines and $200,000 in restitution

== Lawsuits ==
On July 16, 1988, the same fourteen employees were sued by Ernesto Pestana: the casino's landlord. The lawsuit included charges of "breach of contract, negligent misrepresentation, violations of the Racketeer Influenced and Corrupt Organizations (RICO) Act and unjust enrichment". Pestana also claimed that the fourteen indicted individuals had "to participate in the conduct of Garden City's affairs through a pattern of racketeering activity." and that it caused his "stock in the club to depreciate by at least $10 million. The case ended in a settlement totaling $11 million on June 28, 1992.

In 1993, the two convicted and former cardroom managers Gary Craig Rovai and Henry Anthony Schiro, sued the casino for "fir[ing] them without warning... and reng[ing] on promises to provide financial help with their legal troubles." While indicted, the casino, under [the Dalis family's ownership], promised to pay "attorney fees and whatever tax liabilities... that might accrue from their criminal cases in exchange for them... taking a plea bargain... in hopes of saving the club's license." On August 23, 1997, after a trial that lasted for 12 days, both Rovai and Schiro won a combined total of $1,926,327 in punitive and compensatory damages from the casino

== Aftermath ==
By the time the casino was sold to new ownership, Rovai and Schiro were both fired by the casino's new owner: Eli Reinhard

== Involved Parties ==
Indicted personnel	Position In Company	Details
Nicholas John Dalis	President	Pleaded guilty to 12 felony counts of grand theft, attempted grand theft, and all of the above. Sentenced to 3 years in California state prison, and pay $300,000 in fines and restitution combined.
Chris Peter Dalis	Co-founder & Owner	Pleaded guilty. Sentenced to 6 months of house arrest, 300 hours of community service, and pay $239,921 in fines and restitution combined.
Louis Peter Dalis	Co-founder & Owner	Pleaded guilty. Sentenced to pay a $1,100 in fines and restitution.combined.
Carmen Dalis	Owner	Pleaded guilty. Sentenced to 300 hours of community service and pay $71,854 in fines and restitution combined.
Deborah Ann Dalis-Smith	Owner	Pleaded guilty. Sentenced to 6 months of house arrest, 200 hours of community service, and pay $108,713 in fines and restitution combined.
Philip Harris	Cardroom Manager	Pleaded guilty. Sentenced to 1 year of house arrest, 500 hours of community service, and pay $202,582 of fines and restitution combined
Gary Craig Rovai	Cardroom Manager	Found guilty of 5 total felony counts: 1 felony count of conspiracy to violate campaign disclosure laws and 4 counts of filing false individual tax returns. Sentenced to 3 years probation (first eight months served through electronic monitoring), 500 hours of community service, and pay a $41,000 fine.
Mark Francis Talesforce	Cardroom Security Director	Pleaded guilty. Sentenced to 2 months of house arrest, 200 hours of community service, and pay $14,204 in fines and restitution combined.
Dominica Marie Schiro	Business Office Worker	Ordered to pay $1,250. No criminal conviction was entered.
Patria Michelle Jafferies	Bookkeeper	Charges were dropped in exchange for witness testimony.
Henry Anthony Schiro	Employee	Found guilty of 5 total felony counts: 1 felony count of conspiracy to violate campaign disclosure laws and 4 counts of filing false individual tax returns. Sentenced to 3 years probation (first eight months served through electronic monitoring), 500 hours of community service, and pay a $41,000 fine.
Alan Wayne Wasserman	Employee	Pleaded guilty. Sentenced to 200 hours of community service and pay $14,741 in fines and restitution combined.
John David Weingarten	Employee	Pleaded guilty. Sentenced to 1 year of house arrest, 500 hours of community service, and $209,354 in fines and restitution combined.
Frank Nicoletti	Legal counsel	Pleaded guilty. Sentenced to 3 months of house arrest and 300 hours of community service. Nicoletti's California State Bar membership was suspended for one year, as a result of the criminal conviction.
