= TubeMogul =

Brand advertising software

TubeMogul Inc.
- Type: Subsidiary
- Traded as: Nasdaq: TUBE
- Industry: Marketing and Advertising; Advertising Software
- Founded: March 2007
- Founders: John Hughes and Brett Wilson
- Headquarters: Emeryville, CA, US
- Number of locations: 16 (global offices)
- Area served: 70+ Countries
- Revenue: $180.7 million (2015)
- Number of employees: 577 (2015)
- Parent: Adobe Systems
- Website: www.tubemogul.com

TubeMogul is an enterprise software company for brand advertising.

TubeMogul is headquartered in Emeryville, California and has global offices located in Chengdu (China), Chicago, Detroit, Kyiv, New York, London, Los Angeles, Minneapolis, Paris, São Paulo, Singapore, Shanghai, Sydney, Toronto, and Tokyo.

In November 2016, Adobe Systems Incorporated announced an agreement to acquire TubeMogul.

== Company history ==
=== 2007–2009 ===
TubeMogul was founded by Brett Wilson and John Hughes while enrolled as MBA students at the University of California Berkeley's Haas School of Business. In 2007, the TubeMogul team led by Wilson and Hughes won the Haas Business Plan Competition, which provided seed money enabling the development and launch of the product. In its original conception, TubeMogul was a cross-platform online video analytics tool in 2007. Video producers uploaded content through TubeMogul, which would then distribute and track performance across video sharing sites.

=== 2010–2013 ===
In 2010, TubeMogul launched Playtime, an online video ad network, to help advertisers deliver ads to their target audience. Playtime differentiated itself from other online ad networks with its self-service features as well as the level of transparency it provided. In 2011, TubeMogul combined the Playtime ad network with the video syndication platform to become a demand-side platform (DSP) for brand advertisers. TubeMogul's DSP aggregates multiple inventory sources, including advertising exchanges, supply-side platforms, advertising networks as well as direct relationships with premium publishers, local and national broadcasters, cable networks and multichannel video programming distributors.

In 2012, TubeMogul introduced its BrandSafe technology, which ensured that advertisements did not appear alongside objectionable content or run in ineffectively-small video players. In 2013, TubeMogul launched BrandPoint, which allows marketers to execute digital video buys on a gross rating point (GRP) basis, traditionally used by TV advertisers to measure a campaign's effectiveness. In March 2016, TubeMogul partnered with Facebook to reach TV audiences via Nielsen data.

=== 2014 ===
TubeMogul became a publicly traded company on July 18, 2014, and is listed with the NASDAQ Global Select Market using the ticker symbol "TUBE" (See § IPO).

=== 2015–present ===
Also in 2015, TubeMogul participated in a third-party assessment of Video Demand Side Platforms conducted by Forrester Research.

In 2016, TubeMogul announced partnerships and integrations with the social media platforms Facebook, Instagram, Twitter and SnapChat. TubeMogul received the distinction of being the first video advertising platform awarded a Partner Marketing badge from Facebook and was one of eight advertising partners chosen by Snapchat in their initial monetization release strategy.

== Financing ==
TubeMogul received its initial funding after winning the Lester Center's Business Plan Competition while co-founders John Hughes and Brett Wilson were studying at UC Berkeley’s Haas School of Business in 2007. The company received seed funding from NetService Ventures later that same year.

In February 2008, TubeMogul raised $3 million in Series A funding led by Trinity Ventures. In October 2008, they acquired Illuminex, a video analytics company founded by Jason Lopatecki and Adam Rose, for an undisclosed amount.

They raised a combined $10 million in their Series B round in March 2009, led by Foundation Capital. In December 2012 the company raised $28 million in the first tranche of its Series C, led by Northgate Capital. The second tranche of the Series C was led by SingTel Innov8, corporate venture capital arm of the SingTel Group, along with Cross Creek Capital, for $10 million in May 2013.

=== IPO ===
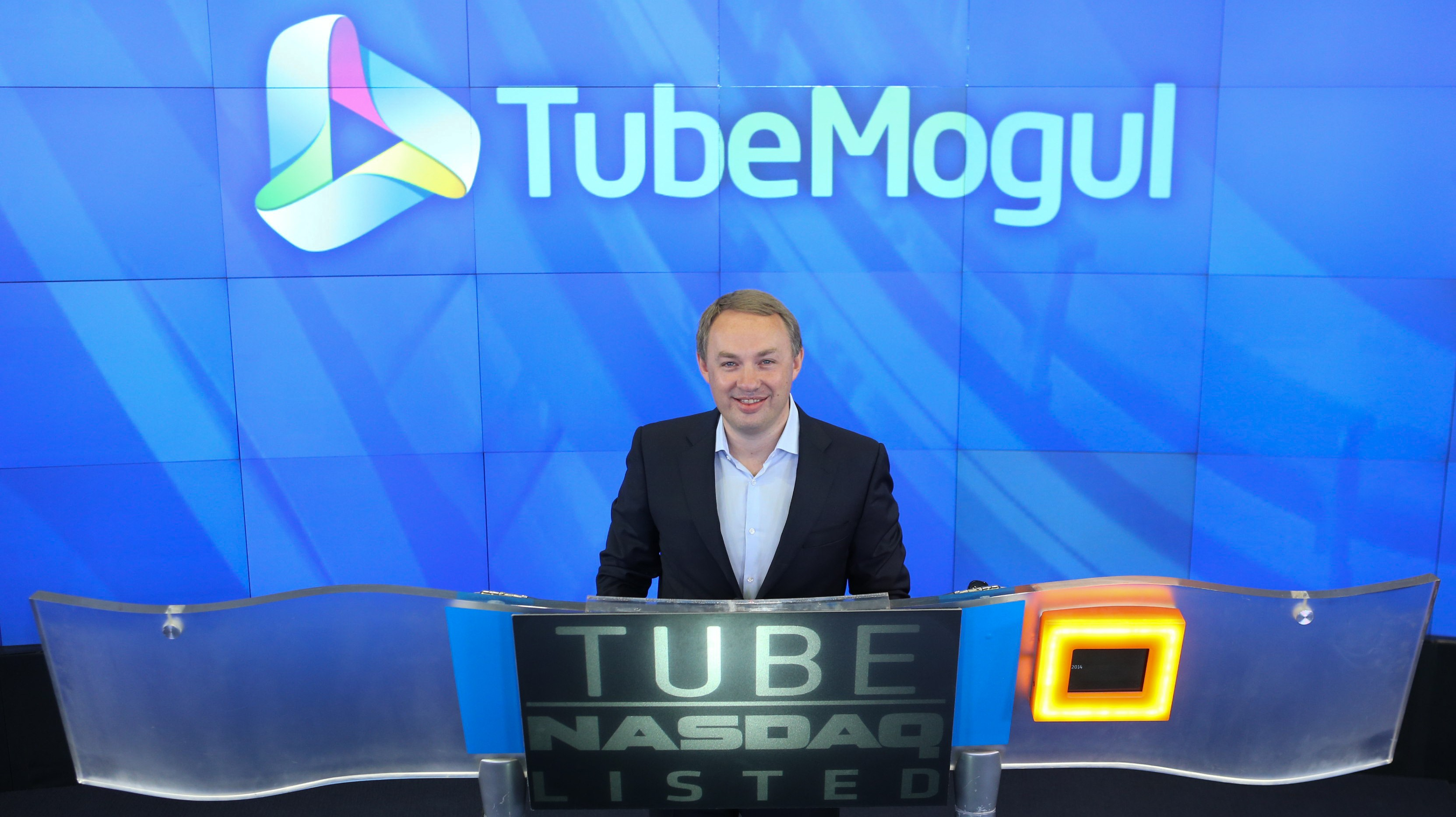
TubeMogul CEO Brett Wilson rings NASDAQ's opening bell July 18, 2014 on the first morning of the company's public offering.

TubeMogul filed its S-1 form with the SEC on March 26, 2014. On July 18, 2014, TubeMogul became a publicly traded company. They made 6.3 million shares available to investors at $7 per share to raise a total of $43.8 million in their initial offering.

=== Adobe acquisition ===
In November 2016, Adobe Systems Incorporated announced an agreement to acquire TubeMogul for $14 per share, or approximately $540 million, in cash. The deal is expected to close in Adobe's first quarter of 2017.

== Industry initiatives ==
=== Non-Human Traffic Credit Program ===
In February 2016, TubeMogul announced the development of a new anti-ad fraud initiative called the Non-Human Traffic Credit Program. Effective April 2016, the company will automatically refund clients whose ads were served to non-human traffic, also known as bots. TubeMogul partnered with ad fraud detection company White Ops, which will apply its verification technology across every video ad bought through TubeMogul's Open RTB platform. The service is available to all clients who have a master service agreement with TubeMogul.

=== Independence Matters ===
In March 2016, TubeMogul launched an advertising campaign alleging Google's dual position as both media owner as well as buying platform creates inherent conflicts of interests for marketers. TubeMogul claims that "Google has made a conscious decision to wall itself off from the rest of the industry." The campaign hints at Google's move to restrict third-party companies from buying YouTube ads via the DoubleClick Ad Exchange.

=== Open Video Viewability (OpenVV) ===
In May 2013, TubeMogul and several other advertising technology vendors formed the Open Video View (OpenVV) consortium to help facilitate the adoption of a viewability standard for online video advertising. OpenVV is an open-source code that provides marketers verification that their ad was actually seen by human eyes and reasons for non-viewability. TubeMogul founded the initiative along with video technology vendors BrightRoll, Innovid, SpotXChange, and LiveRail; current members include Nielsen, comScore, TrustE, and VivaKi.

In June 2015, the IAB Tech Lab took over management of the OpenVV initiative.

=== Fraud/Fake Pre-Roll ===
In 2012, TubeMogul launched fakepreroll.com to raise awareness about video ads that were shown in inventory normally reserved for display advertisements, oftentimes without the marketer's knowledge. The site was taken down after several companies sent TubeMogul cease-and-desist orders.

=== Botnet detection ===
In 2014, TubeMogul reported the existence of three botnets, responsible for defrauding advertisers for a potential $10 million each month.

=== IPG internship ===
In March 2014, IPG Mediabrands and TubeMogul announced the "Ad-Tech Apprenticeship," a one-year intensive training program designed to give college graduates a holistic view of the digital advertising industry.

== Open source contributions ==
TubeMogul is both a consumer of and contributor to free and open source software. TubeMogul's contributions include a list of Puppet Modules released on the Puppet Forge, and OpenVV.

TubeMogul also contributes to an Engineering Blog, other open source projects on GitHub, meetup, and public talk at conferences like Velocity, USENIX LISA, SRECon, SuiteWorld, Puppet Camp, OpenStack Summit, Nagios World.

TubeMogul has adopted successfully a private cloud strategy while going through hyper-growth and leveraging the open source project OpenStack.

== See also ==
- Demand-side platform
- Online advertising
- Real-time bidding
- Video ad platform
- Video advertising
