= Casino M8trix =

Cardroom in San Jose, California, US

Coordinates: 37.3712°N 121.9199°W

- Official logo of Casino M8trix since 2013
- Interactive map of Casino M8trix
- Location: San Jose, California; 1887 Matrix Boulevard San Jose, California 95110
- Opened: 1946
- Casino type: Land-Based
- Owner: Garden City, Inc.
- Previous names: Garden City Billiards Parlor (1946–1951); Garden City Hofbrau (1951–1974); Garden City Casino: (1976–2012)
- Website: Casino M8trix

Casino M8trix is a cardroom in San Jose, California. The 8-story casino offers table games and a poker room. The casino secured one of the 15 card room licenses in San Jose. Since 2024, The casino is currently owned by Garden City, Inc. which consists of the following four parties: the Lunardi Trust (Peter, Jeanine, Anthony, and Jaclyn Lunardi), the Erickson Family Trust (James & Vanessa Erickson), Patrick & Jamie Tierney, and Bruce Lance.

== Garden City Billiards Parlor and Garden City Hofbrau (1946-1974) ==
Garden City Billiards Parlor was founded 1946 by three brothers: Chris Peter Dalis, Louis Peter Dalis, and Nicholas Peter Dalis. Its initial location was in Downtown San Jose. In 1951, the restaurant was converted into a Hofbrau. The hofbrau used to have a "Bavarian Room... for dancing and music". The restaurant was closed in 1974 because "the building was deemed structurally unsound."

== Garden City Casino (1976-2012) ==
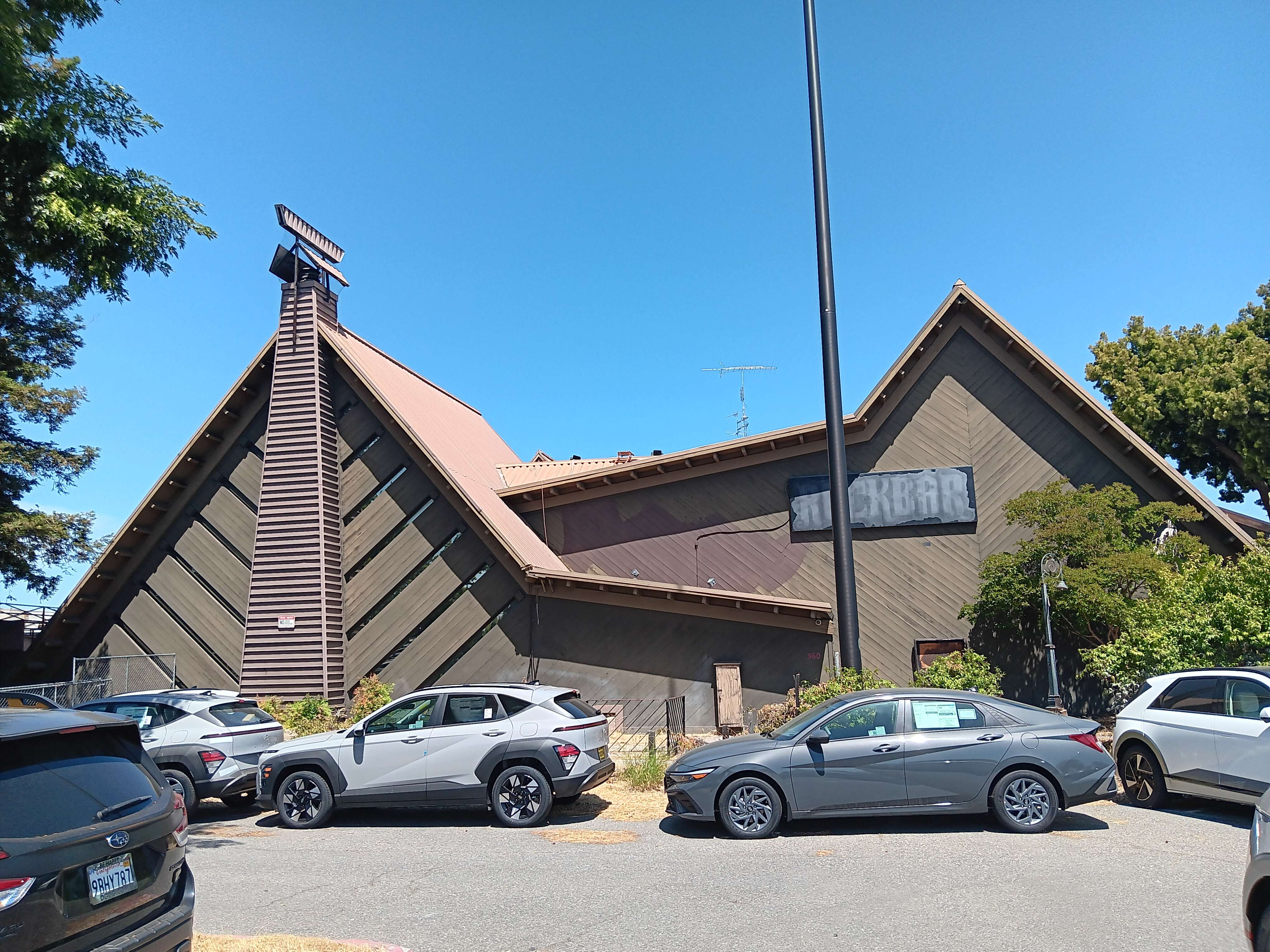
Building of Garden City Casino (2025)

In 1976, the Dalis family relocated the business into a "chateau-like" building in the West San Jose neighborhood, and renamed it to Garden City Casino. The casino hosted artists that played jazz music (ranging from Dixieland jazz to Progressive jazz) such as guitarist Bud Dimock and piano player Martan Mann.

In 1993, the Dalis brothers transferred ownership to the casino's attorney: Stanley Friedman, on an interim basis, due to the brothers' involvement in the casino's skimming scandal. Five months later, the casino was sold to builder Eli Reinhard.

On August 1, 1998, the casino filed for Chapter 11 Bankruptcy.

On March 1, 2007, the casino was sold to a group of four individuals from Contra Costa County: Eric Swallow, Peter Lundardi, Jeanine Lundardi, and Dina DiMartino via approval of reorganization plan in U.S. bankruptcy court.

== Casino M8trix (2012-present) ==
The casino has been involved with charity programs such as Second Harvest Food Bank and HERS Breast Cancer Foundation.

In 2014, the casino was accused of hiding profits and could lose its gaming license if convicted.

In 2023, the casino opened up a sushi restaurant called Sushi Confidential. The restaurant has a roll named after the casino.

== See also ==
- Garden City Casino skimming scandal
- List of casinos in California
