= Match Analysis =

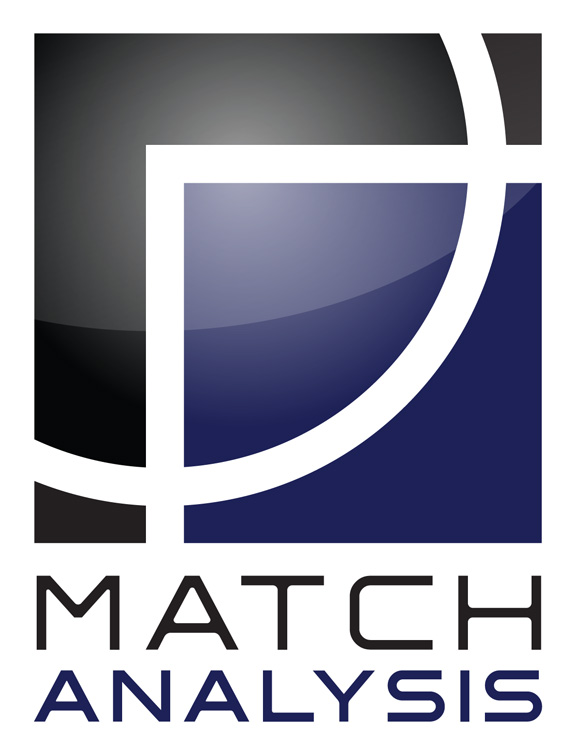
- Company type: Private
- Industry: Sports Technology, Video Analysis and Statistical Data
- Founded: 2000
- Headquarters: Emeryville, California
- Area served: Worldwide
- Key people: Mark Brunkhart (Founder, President)
- Products: Mambo Studio, Tango Online, Tango ToGo, Tango Live, Tango Broadcast, Player Tracking, K2 Panoramic Video, K2 TrueView Visualization
- Number of employees: 70
- Website: www.matchanalysis.com

Match Analysis is a US company with headquarters in Emeryville, California. The company employs 70 staff in their offices and data collection facilities in California and Mexico City, Mexico.

The company provides video analysis tools and digital library archiving services supplying performance and physical tracking data to football (soccer) coaches, teams, and players. The objective is to improve individual and team performance and/or analyze opposition patterns of play to give tactical advantage.

Match Analysis records and verifies over 2,500 distinct events per football match with every touch by every player catalogued, synchronized against video feeds, and stored in a searchable video database.

== History ==
Match Analysis was founded in 2000 by Mark Brunkhart, its current President, after he developed a system to help amateur football players see the game objectively.

The system evolved from a collection of printed reports and info graphics into video analysis software and statistical data tools supplied to professional and amateur football teams, governing bodies/professional organizations and media partners around the world.

Match Analysis is one of the pioneers of statistical analysis in football. In 2002, the company released Mambo Studio, the first video editing and retrieval system for football. In 2004, Tango Online was launched to replace printed reports with the first instant access online video database of a complete league.

In May 2012, Match Analysis acquired Edinburgh based Spinsight Ltd purchasing the intellectual property and other assets relating to its K2 Panoramic Video Camera System.

Match Analysis signed strategic alliances with Major League Soccer and Liga MX in 2013. In addition Match Analysis's K2 Panoramic Video Camera System was implemented in every stadium across Major League Soccer and Liga MX in the summer of 2013.

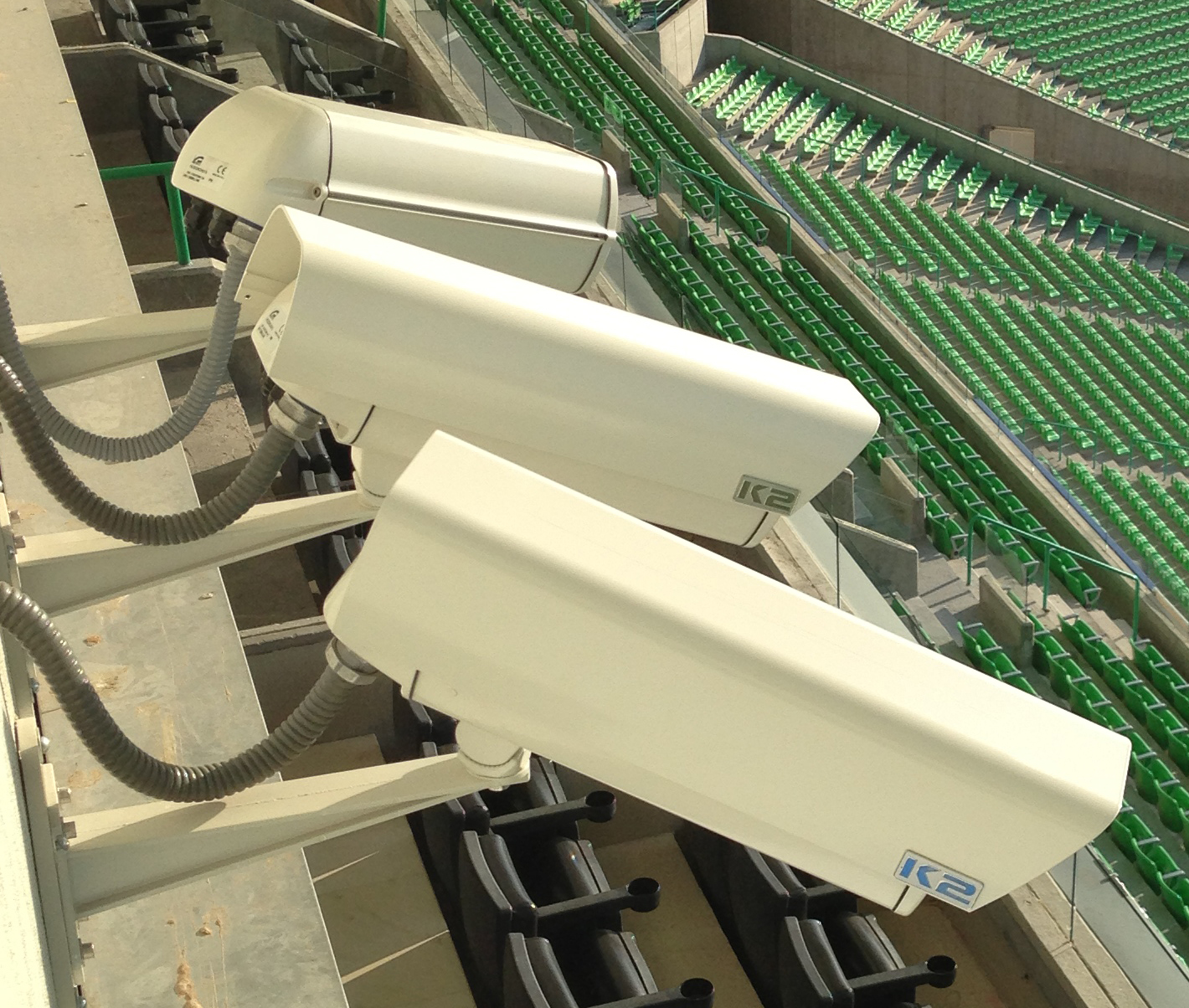
Match Analysis K2 Panoramic Video Camera System

During November 2015, Match Analysis participated in discussions with IFAB and FIFA at their headquarters in Zürich, Switzerland to advise on global standards for electronic performance and tracking systems.

In May 2016, Match Analysis announced the introduction of Tango VIP their new foundational technology platform for their extensive online presence.

== Products ==
Match Analysis tools and services provide video indexing and archiving, statistical analysis, live data collection, player tracking, fitness reports, and performance analysis.

The company's product range includes Mambo Studio, K2 Panoramic Video, TrueView Visualizations, Tango Online, Tango Live, Tango ToGo, Player Tracking and Fitness Reports.

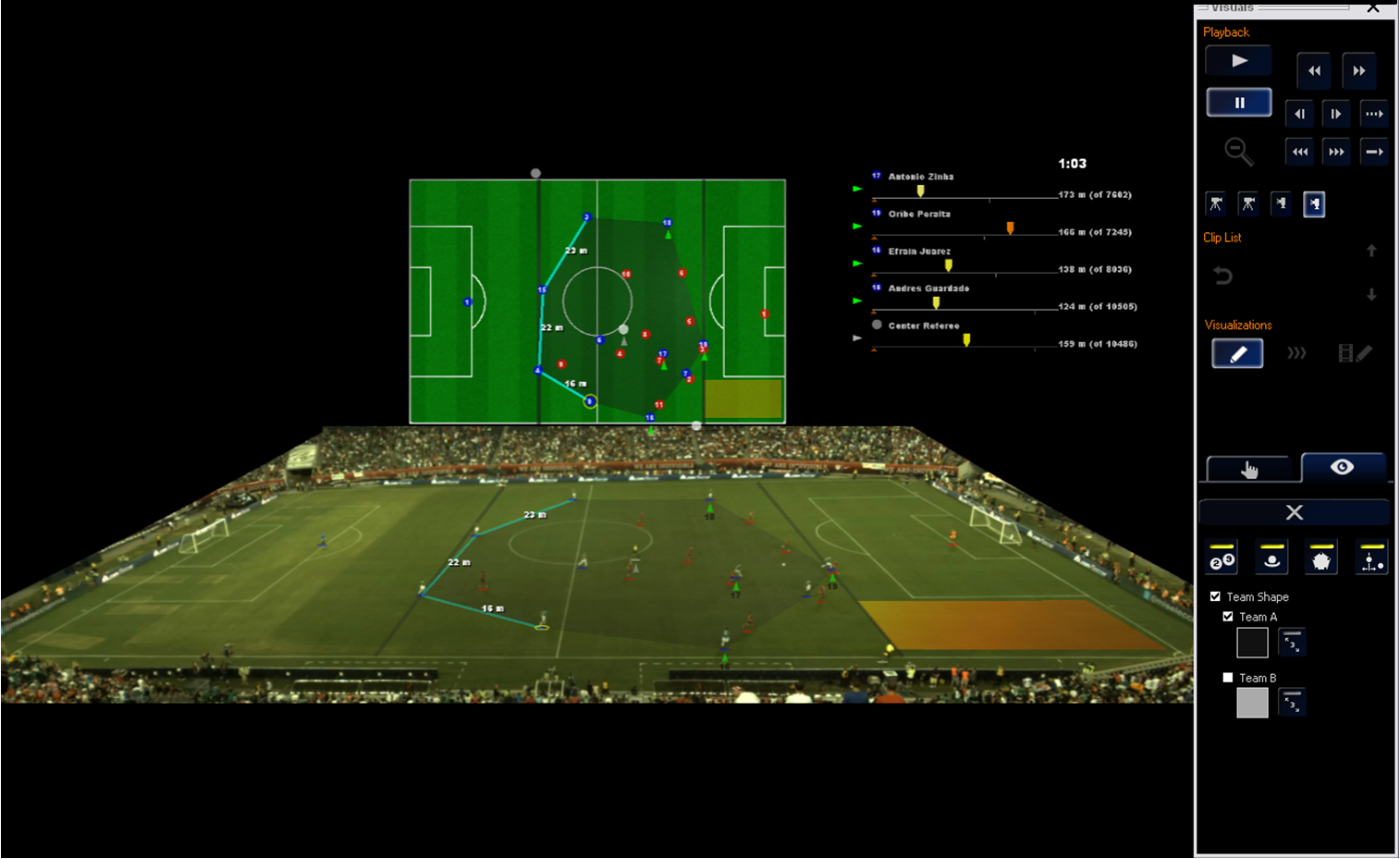
Match Analysis K2 Panoramic Video with TrueView Visualizations

== Clients ==
The company has worked with eight different national teams including Germany, the United States, and Mexico and has relationships with over 50 professional clubs. Match Analysis currently supports league-wide deals with Major League Soccer and Liga MX.

Over the past decade, Match Analysis has worked with almost every major professional club in North America and media outlets including the New York Times World Cup coverage.

Current Match Analysis clients include all 18 Liga MX clubs in Mexico, 17 MLS clubs, the Mexico national team, PRO Professional Referee Organization and a wide array of college and amateur sides.

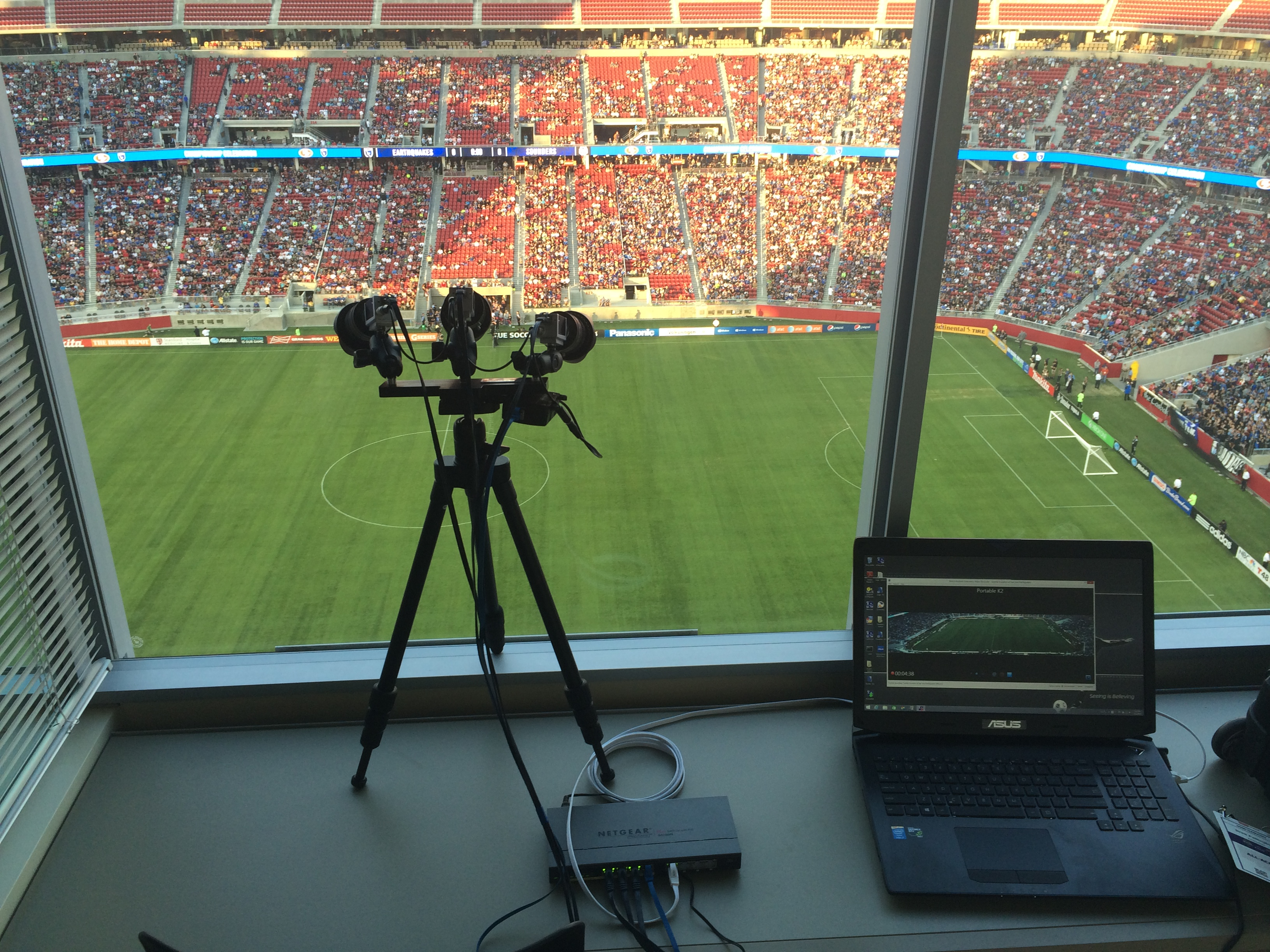
Match Analysis Portable K2 Panoramic Video Camera System
