= Cache Creek Casino Resort =

Casino resort in Brooks, California

Coordinates: 38.734837°N 122.141834°W

- Interactive map of Cache Creek Casino Resort
- Location: 14455 Highway 16 Brooks, California 95606
- Opened: July 25, 1985
- Theme: Indian
- No. of rooms: 659
- Gaming space: 74,270 square feet (6,900 m^{2})
- Signature attractions: Cache Creek Event Center & 18-hole championship golf course
- Notable restaurants: C2 Steak & Seafood
- Casino type: Native American casino
- Owner: Yocha Dehe Wintun Nation
- Renovated in: 2020
- Website: Cache Creek Casino Resort

Cache Creek Casino Resort is a resort and casino located in Brooks, in Northern California's Capay Valley. Opened as a bingo hall in July 1985, it was renovated in 2002 and completed in 2004 as a destination resort. The connected hotel contains 659 rooms, including 27 suites. Cache Creek offers 2,300 slot machines, more than 85 table games, a 14 table poker room (currently closed after COVID), day spa, eleven restaurants, and an 18-hole championship golf course, Yocha Dehe Golf Club.

== History ==
On June 25, 1985, the Rumsey Band of the Wintun Indians (now known as the Yocha Dehe Wintun Nation) opened a modest bingo hall on their Rancheria in Brooks. The popularity of Cache Creek Indian Bingo & Casino soared immediately, and on October 7, 1993, the hall was expanded to include card games.

A second expansion began in 1996 and was opened in phases in 1998 and 1999. The bingo hall now had a 1,200-seat capacity, and three new restaurants were opened, including China Camp and a 150-seat buffet. After California Governor Gray Davis signed the State Gaming Compact in 1999, the casino added slot machines and more table games.

In 2002, the tribe announced plans to build a $200 million property, renamed Cache Creek Casino Resort, on land adjacent to the existing facility. Completed and opened in 2004, the resort now features nine restaurants, the 600-seat Club 88, the 20,000-square-foot (1,900 m^{2}) multi-purpose event center, and 74,720 square feet (6,942 m^{2}) of casino floor space.

Beginning in November 2006, Cache Creek Resort remodeled again, removing the bingo hall and event center and expanding the poker room and slot machine area. This remodel also included a sports bar and grill called the Sportspage.

In 2010, the tribe announced their Event Center Project (ECP), which is designed to offer additional amenities at the resort (including wireless access for all areas), provide additional administrative support space, and provide more parking. The proposed project would allow the tribe to bring newer and larger entertainment acts, musical performances, and other events to the resort that could not previously be accommodated. The newest outdoor stage was completed in 2011.

Then in May 2017, another expansion plan was unveiled, featuring 459 more hotel rooms, taking the overall resort total to 659 rooms. Additional features of the latest expansion include a multipurpose event/concert space, new restaurant, added meeting spaces, and a second pool.

A hotel expansion of $180 million was unveiled in February of 2026 that included a new resort pool, spa and new entertainment and event amenities.

== See also ==
- List of casinos in California
