= California Grand Casino =

Cardroom in Pacheco, California, US

Coordinates: 37.98194°N 122.06750°W

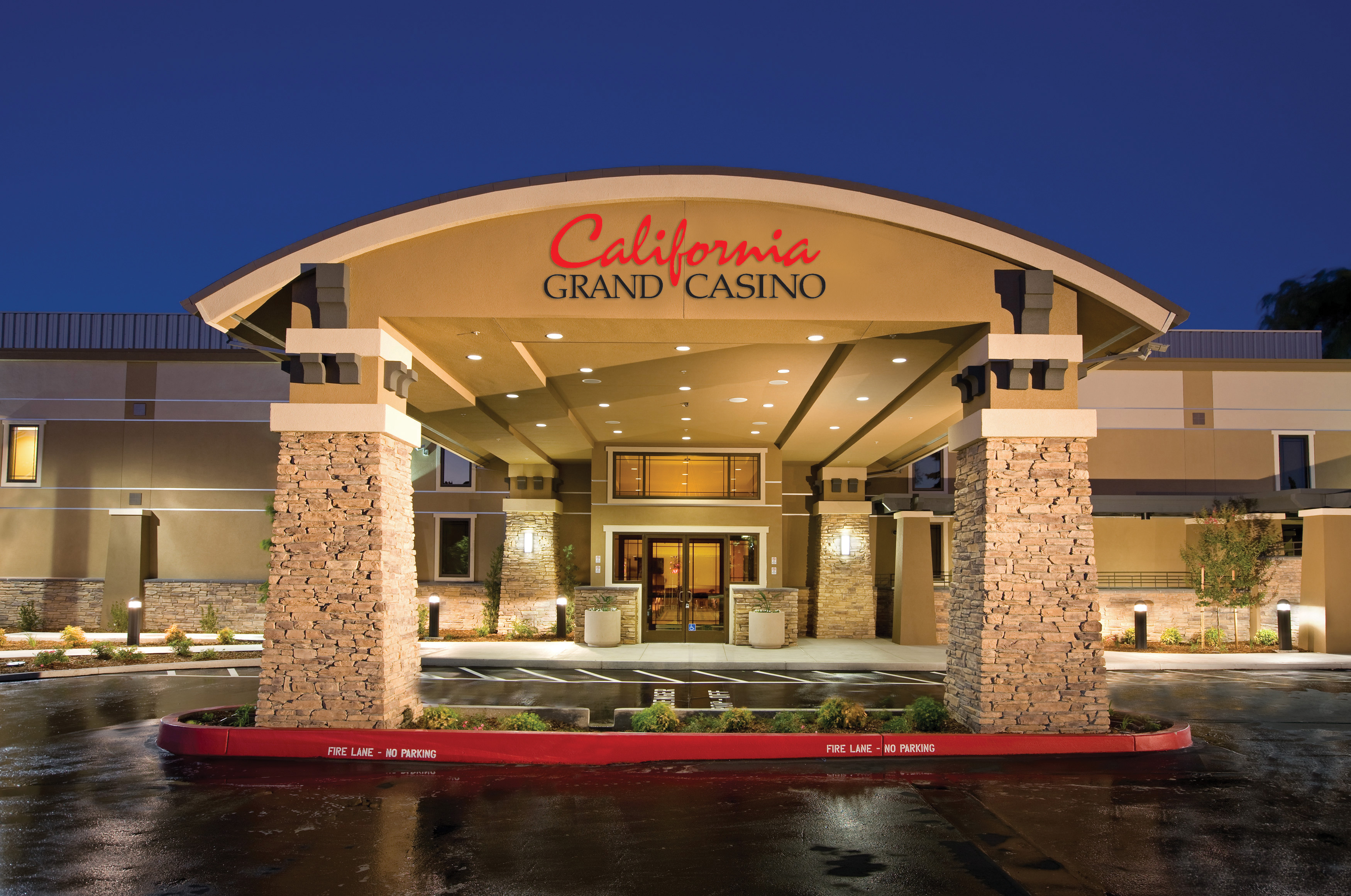
California Grand Casino

The California Grand Casino is a cardroom located in Pacheco, California. The original hotel and card room was a Pony Express stop in 1860. According to Card Player magazine, the California Grand Casino is the oldest continuously operating poker room in the world, with poker games since 1854.

A new casino facility opened across the street in July 2009 with 19 gaming tables, a bar and a restaurant called The Grand Cafe. Eleven times the California Grand Casino has been voted Best Local Casino in the San Francisco East Bay, including Best Local Casino for 2026, by readers of the Bay Area News Group which includes the East Bay Times, San Jose Mercury News and Oakland Tribune.

== History ==
The casino started in 1854 when the Woodford Hotel and Saloon opened its doors on what is now Pacheco Boulevard and offered alcohol, prostitution, and gambling. The hotel became a stagecoach and Wells Fargo Pony Express Stop in 1860. The original building bears a historical marker from the Pony Express Trail Association. In 2009, the California Grand Casino moved into a new building.

== Games ==
The California Grand Casino offers Texas hold 'em poker games. The poker games all feature three blinds, meaning that the player on the button also posts a blind bet. This leads to more players seeing the flop and more action in the games. The Casino has a number of poker jackpots and prizes with more than $30 million in jackpots paid to players.

The California Grand Casino also has Hot Action Blackjack, EZ Baccarat, Three Card Poker, Face Up Pai Gow Poker and Pai Gow Poker with a fully wild joker. In California, the casino does not bank the games. These games are played with a rotating dealer position so every player has the chance to wager against the other players, but the casino dealer still does the actual dealing and settling of all wagers.

== See also ==
- List of casinos in California
