= Sam Gilbert (businessman) =

American businessman

Sam Gilbert (1913 – November 23, 1987) was an American businessman who owned a construction company in Los Angeles, California. He is best known as a controversial athletic booster of the UCLA Bruins men's basketball team from the mid-1960s until UCLA was ordered to disassociate from him in 1981. He ran a money-laundering enterprise to finance the now-famous World Poker Tour tour stop called the Bicycle Casino, for which he was posthumously indicted in 1987. He was the husband of a well-known Los Angeles area teacher, Rose Gilbert.

== Personal life ==
Gilbert was born in the Los Angeles area. His parents had left Lithuania to escape persecution. Growing up in Hollywood, he graduated from Hollywood High School and then attended UCLA in the 1930s, but did not graduate. He was interested in civil rights and was an NAACP activist. Gilbert had two sons, Michael and Robert, from his first wife.

=== Rose Gilbert ===
Sam Gilbert met his second wife, Rose, through his younger brother. Rose was a graduate of UCLA, and became a renowned teacher at Palisades Charter High School. She was acknowledged by the Los Angeles Unified School District by a Lifetime Teacher and Golden Apple Awards. Rose was named Harvard University's Impact Teacher of the Year. She has appeared on CBS Television shows 48 Hours and the CBS Evening News with Katie Couric. Rose also has appeared on the May 2007 cover of Teacher Magazine. Rose had a daughter, Maggie, from her first marriage, who died of an embolism in 2004 at age 54. Rose died on December 16, 2013, at the age of 95.

Rose was named by Star Wars: The Force Awakens writer/director J. J. Abrams as the influence for the character of Maz Kanata. Abrams told his home town newspaper, the Palisadian-Post, that he based Maz on Rose:

We really wanted the story to feel authentic, despite being a wild fantasy. I mentioned Rose in an early story meeting as a sort of timeless, wise figure that I'd actually known in my life ... While we experimented with many looks and styles before settling on the character's final design, Rose was always at the center of the inspiration for Maz.

== Business ==
Gilbert owned Sam Gilbert and Associates, a construction company that built homes and commercial buildings in the West Los Angeles area.

He developed inventions, including metal studs and a door lock that made him wealthy.

== Athletic booster ==
Known as "Papa Sam" and "Papa G" to UCLA players, Gilbert began his relationship with UCLA basketball sometime around 1966–1967, when UCLA player Willie Naulls brought Lew Alcindor (now Kareem Abdul-Jabbar) and Lucius Allen to him for some counseling. He opened up his Bel-Air, Los Angeles home to the players and became an advisor to many. He bought clothes, cars, and even arranged abortions for players' girlfriends.

Gilbert became the sports agent for the professional contracts of Alcindor, Allen, Sidney Wicks, Henry Bibby, Bill Walton and Swen Nater. He and Los Angeles businessman Ralph Shapiro negotiated a $1.4 million contract for Alcindor with the Milwaukee Bucks at no charge to Alcindor.

Coach Gene Bartow, who followed John Wooden as coach of the Bruin men's basketball team, felt his life was threatened by Gilbert. He thanked the NCAA in 1993 for not investigating the UCLA program in 1976.

Following the death of UCLA Athletic Director J.D. Morgan in 1980, Gilbert began to exert more influence on the UCLA basketball team. Coach Larry Brown "ran afoul" of Gilbert according to a 1988 Sports Illustrated article.

A 1981 investigation by the Los Angeles Times found that Gilbert had regularly helped UCLA athletes get discounts on items such as automobiles, stereos and airline tickets, and in so doing, apparently committed numerous violations of NCAA regulations. The investigation did not uncover evidence that Wooden had explicit personal awareness of Gilbert's activities. However, Gilbert's overall influence in the lives of the players was no secret. This led the Times reporters to conclude that if Wooden was not aware of the specifics of Gilbert's favors for players, it was only because Wooden made no effort to discover those details. For his part, Wooden acknowledged that he had always felt uneasy about Gilbert's relationship with the players, but steadfastly denied having knowledge at the time of anything done by Gilbert that was in violation of NCAA regulations. He also asserted that both he and Morgan had advised players to steer clear of Gilbert, but that ultimately they could not control the players' or Gilbert's actions. Given what later came to light, however, Wooden granted that he may have had "tunnel vision" and that he perhaps "trusted too much". Nonetheless, Wooden said that his "conscience [was] clear" with regard to his own role in the matter.

Following the investigation in 1981, in which, according to the Los Angeles Times, 15 years worth of evidence of transgressions had been collected, the UCLA basketball team was given two years NCAA probation. UCLA also was forced to vacate its Final Four appearance in the 1980 NCAA Men's Division I Basketball Tournament due to recruiting violations involving Rod Foster and others.

The 2007 film The UCLA Dynasty, produced by HBO, contains a segment on Gilbert. HBO producer George Roy believes he was journalistically responsible to include it or face criticism.

== Indictment ==
In 1987, Gilbert was the subject of a federal investigation into money laundering and racketeering charges. According to the investigation, a scheme to launder the money received from smuggling marijuana was put together to finance the construction of the Bicycle Casino in Bell Gardens, California. According to one criminal complaint,

[Sam Gilbert] a wealthy Los Angeles businessman, was the first Gilbert to establish ties with the Kramer family when he befriended Benjamin Kramer's father, Jack Kramer, in 1978. At that time, Jack Kramer and Sam Gilbert came up with the idea of building a legal card club for the purposes of laundering Benjamin Kramer's dirty money. By 1983, Sam Gilbert was in contact with David Pierson, who was himself thinking of building a card club and was looking for legitimate investors. Pierson gave Sam Gilbert a prospectus, Sam liked what he saw, and Sam agreed to arrange the financing for the project in return for a sixty percent share of Pierson's ownership interest in the Club.

Gilbert was indicted in Miami four days after his death. His son Michael also was indicted.

George Hardie and The Park Place Associates ownership were exonerated in 1990, and they regained their 35% stake. LCP partners Julianne Coyne and former California Assemblyman David C. Pierson settled before the civil hearing. In 1991, they agreed to give up about half of their interest in LCP, which had a 65% stake in the casino.

== UCLA Endowments from the Gilbert family ==
The Rose and Sam Gilbert Fellowship at UCLA pays fees for two graduate students who attended UCLA as undergraduates for at least two years and participated on men's or women's athletic teams.

The Maggie G. Gilbert Endowed chair in Bipolar disorders, was established in 2008 at the Jane and Terry Semel Institute for Neuroscience and Human Behavior at UCLA.
