= Eagle Mountain Casino =

Casino in Porterville, California, United States

- Interactive map of Eagle Mountain Casino
- Location: Porterville, California, United States; 681 South Reservation Road; 36°02′02″N 118°46′35″W
- Opened: 1996
- Theme: Tule River Tribe culture
- No. of rooms: 250 (new building)
- Owner: Tule River Tribe
- Renovated in: 2021 (HBG Design)
- Website: www.eaglemtncasino.com

Eagle Mountain Casino is an Indian tribal casino operated by the Tule River Indian Tribe of the Tule River Reservation in Porterville, California, adjacent to the Porterville Municipal Airport. In 2020, it received approval to be moved from the reservation to free up water for residents.

== History ==
The casino opened on June 1, 1996 in the Tule River Reservation in California.

In October 2019, "the assistant secretary for the Bureau of Indian Affairs (BIA) signed a record of decision (ROD) and issued a secretarial determination giving the Tule Tribe its blessing to relocate Eagle Mt. Casino to a 40-acre site near the Porterville airport, 15 miles off reservation land," after determining that the proposed project was in the best interest of the tribe. After the casino closed due to COVID-19 cases in Tulare County, on August 21, 2020, the casino reopened after a decision by the Tule River Tribal Council. The Forest Buffet stayed closed, and the Grizzly Food Court was re-opened for 24-hours a day with limited capacity. It had previously closed in July 2020, after re-opening in June.

On August 4, 2020, Gavin Newsom agreed to allow the relocation of the casino into Porterville. The new plan for a $180 million casino included 1,750 gaming machines and twice as many table games. It was approved by the Department of the Interior that December.

On April 6, 2021, Tule River Tribe broke ground on the new property for Eagle Mountain Casino, to be moved from the reservation to Porterville. It was set to open in fall 2022 on 40 acres near the Porterville Airport. The new development circumvents a water shortage that "hobbled on development on reservation land" for years. The move freed up water on the reservation for private residences. The new hotel will include 250 hotel rooms, 29,000 square feet of convention space, restaurants, and a sports bar. HBG Design was chosen to oversee the project, to cost about $250 million. The new architecture is designed to reflect Tule River heritage, where "giant sequoias and golden eagles are tribal cultural symbols." It was reported in April 2021 that the old casino building would be used as additional medical facilities.

The final beam was installed to a celebration in October 2021 in a topping out ceremony. The Tribal chairman noted the property had been purchased for the project in 1988. The new casino is a 100,000 square foot facility with 2,000 seats in the event center. The Recorder Online in December 2021 published that the Tule River Tribe was at the time "able to maintain self-sufficiency largely in part to Eagle Mountain Casino." The tribe also stated that "with the Casino moving to a new location, even more members will be able to move to the reservation and more resources will be available to tribal members."

Another reason for the relocation of the casino was the mountainous road needed to get to the reservation, occasionally subject to closure due to weather. The original casino shut down prematurely on March 11, 2023 due to the 2022–2023 California floods and did not reopen prior to the inauguration of the new casino.

The new casino had a soft opening on April 17, 2023, with a full opening on May 9, 2023. The casino employs approximately 1,000 employees.

== Entertainment ==
A "medium," Tyler Henry, performed in Feb 2022 at the casino. He had been preceded that fall by Dwight Yoakam.

== Casino ==
The new casino size is 100,000 square feet, with 1,750 slot machines and 20 table games. Unlike the previous casino, which did not serve alcohol, the new facility serves alcohol on the floor. The minimum gambling age was raised to 21 as a result. The previous casino was converted to tribal offices and schools, with some restaurant facilities remaining to provide food service to tribal residents.

== See also ==
- List of casinos in California
