= Oaks Card Club =

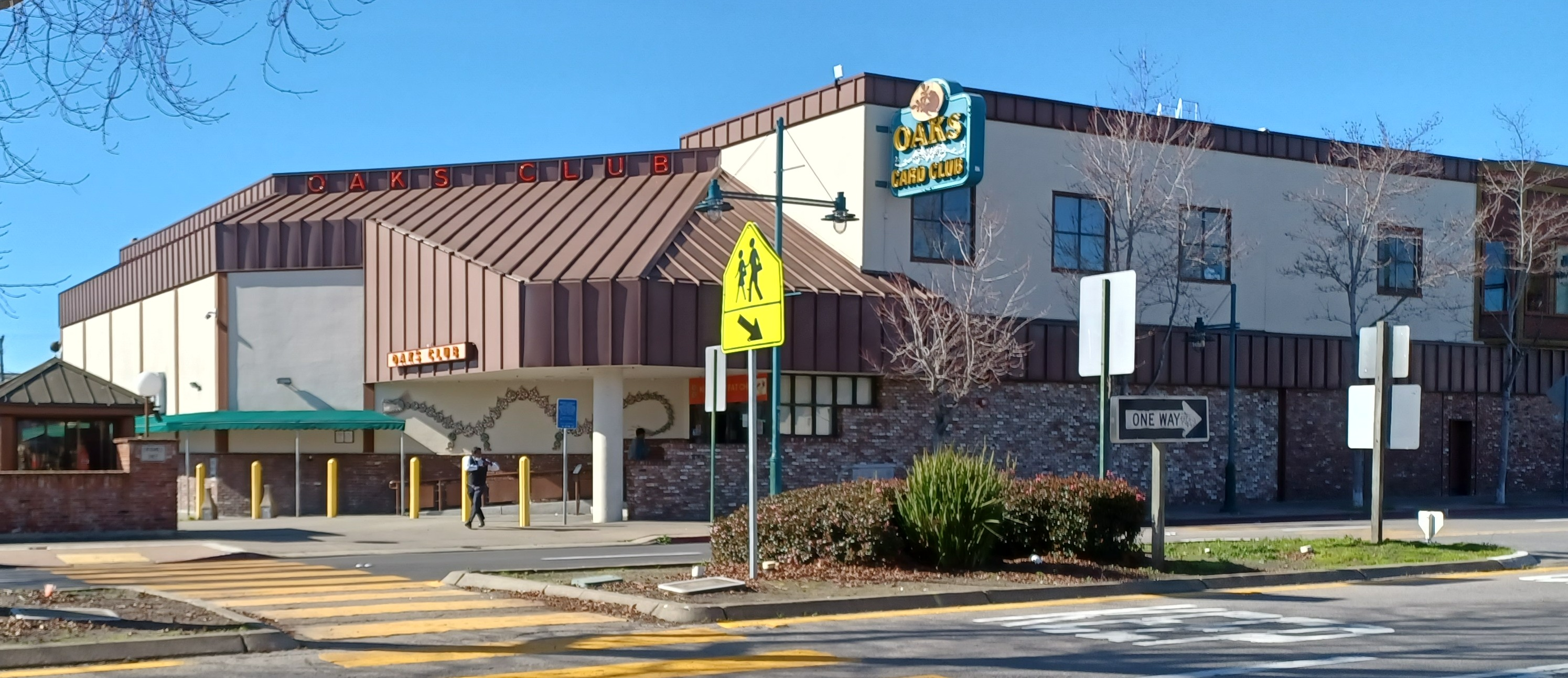
- Industry: Card Club
- Headquarters: Emeryville, California, United States
- Website: oakscardclub.com

Oaks Card Club is a card club in Emeryville, California.

== History ==
The club was founded in 1898, in the city of Emeryville, California. The club's record jackpot came in 2015 at $200,000 worth. In 2016 its employees earned $14 an hour.
