= The Bicycle Hotel & Casino =

Casino in Bell Gardens, California, US

Coordinates: 33.966312°N 118.166148°W

- Parkwest Bicycle Casino in 2026
- Interactive map of The Bicycle Hotel & Casino
- Location: 888 Bicycle Casino Drive Bell Gardens, California 90201
- Opened: November 30, 1984
- Casino type: Land
- Owner: Parkwest Casinos
- Previous names: The Bicycle Casino
- Renovated in: 2015 (Hotel Addition)
- Website: www.thebike.com

Parkwest Bicycle Casino (formerly The Bicycle Hotel & Casino) (commonly, "The Bike") is a poker cardroom in California.

Founded by George Hardie Sr. in 1984, located in Bell Gardens, California, The Bicycle Casino offers a selection of poker games and Asian games, with a wide range of limits. The casino features games including blackjack, Texas hold 'em, seven-card stud, Omaha hold 'em, Mexican poker, pai gow poker, Three Card Poker and baccarat.

Financing to build the original Bicycle Club casino was provided by Sam Gilbert, who allegedly used money partially obtained from laundering drug money. The casino is home to the Legends of Poker, a tournament series established in 1995 that now includes a stop on the World Poker Tour. Prior to the Legends, the casino's main tournament series was called the Diamond Jim Brady.

Parkwest Casinos acquired the Bicycle in 2022.

== Seizure and indictment ==
In 1987, Sam Gilbert was the subject of a federal investigation into money laundering and racketeering charges. According to the investigation, a scheme to launder the money received from smuggling marijuana was put together to finance the construction of the Bicycle Casino in Bell Gardens, California. According to one criminal complaint,

"[Sam Gilbert] a wealthy Los Angeles businessman, was the first Gilbert to establish ties with the Kramer family when he befriended Benjamin Kramer's father, Jack Kramer, in 1978. At that time, Jack Kramer and Sam Gilbert came up with the idea of building a legal card club for the purposes of laundering Benjamin Kramer's dirty money. By 1983, Sam Gilbert was in contact with David Pierson, who was himself thinking of building a card club and was looking for legitimate investors. Pierson gave Sam Gilbert a prospectus, Sam liked what he saw, and Sam agreed to arrange the financing for the project in return for a sixty percent share of Pierson's ownership interest in the Club."

Gilbert was indicted in Miami 4 days after his death. His son Michael also was indicted.

The U.S. Government seized the casino in April, 1990, after a jury found that $12 million of the $22 million used in its construction came from Florida drug smugglers. The club's profits were frozen and placed in a special U.S. Marshals account until the court held a civil hearing to determine which partners knew that the club was built with drug money.

George Hardie and The Park Place Associates ownership were exonerated in 1990, and they regained their 35% stake.

In July 1991 a Florida federal judge ruled that at least one of the partners, former Los Angeles Westside banker M. Dale Lyon, knew about the club's financing. Eight other partners in the LCP Associates, the partnership named for Lyon, Coyne and Pierson, agreed to forfeit portions of their interest in the club before the civil hearing began. LCP partners Julianne Coyne and former California Assemblyman David C. Pierson settled before the civil hearing. In 1991, they agreed to give up about half of their interest in LCP, which had a 65% stake in the casino.

By the time it sold its share of the casino in 1996, the US government had made tens of millions of dollars in profit from its share of the casino. As a partner in the club, the government also contributed to political campaigns to defeat the proposal to build a rival card club in Orange County.

== 2017 raid ==
The casino was again raided by federal authorities citing money laundering as a part of an ongoing investigation into some players using the casino to exchange “dirty money” for chips, then turn cashing those in for “clean money.”

== Live at the Bike ==
The Bicycle Hotel & Casino was the first brick and mortar casino to broadcast a live poker cash game over the Internet in a program known as Live at the Bike. It runs five nights a week, and features poker pros, celebrities and regular cash grinders. The show has always had card graphics and professional commentary, making it one of the longest running poker shows ever.

== Expansion ==
The Bicycle Hotel & Casino underwent a major hotel expansion in the Fall of 2015. The new seven-story, 117,907 square-foot complex now includes live entertainment, gaming, cocktail lounge, brewery, fitness center, sundeck with an outdoor bar, and a number of places to dine.

== In popular media ==
The Bicycle Casino was featured in an episode of the TV series Numb3rs dealing with the murder of a successful card-counter, who coincidentally was also heavily into bicycle home repair.

== See also ==
- List of casinos in California
