= Hollywood Park Casino =

Casino in Inglewood, California

- Interactive map of Hollywood Park Casino
- Location: 3883 W. Century Boulevard Inglewood, CA 90303; 33°56′47.1″N 118°20′19.0″W
- Opened: 1994 (original casino); October 21, 2016 (current casino)
- Casino type: Land
- Owner: Stockbridge Capital Group
- Renovated in: 2015
- Website: http://www.playhpc.com/

Hollywood Park Casino is a casino and sports bar in the Hollywood Park district of Inglewood, California, adjacent to SoFi Stadium. Originally part of the Hollywood Park Racetrack, the casino moved to a new building in 2016 after the closure and demolition of the racetrack in 2013.

== History ==
In July 1994, the Hollywood Park Casino, with a poker card room, was added to the Hollywood Park Racetrack complex. The original casino owners were the Hollywood Park Operating Co., which also owned the racetrack. Afterward, the casino went through a series of owners, including Churchill Downs. The racetrack was sold and shut down in December 2013 though the casino operations continued while the current casino building opened in October 2016. The casino is adjacent to the Hollywood Park development which also features SoFi Stadium, home to the Los Angeles Rams and Los Angeles Chargers of the National Football League, and will later include multiple housing, business parks, luxury hotels, a movie theatre, and an open-air shopping center. It was the first building of the complex to be constructed and opened.

The current owners are Stockbridge Capital Group, a San Francisco-based land developer which purchased both the casino and racetrack in 2005 for nearly $260 million. It is planned that the new casino, entertainment complex, and NFL stadium will improve the finances of the casino, which had been on a downturn since the Los Angeles Kings and Los Angeles Lakers left The Forum in May 1999.

The Hollywood Park Casino has 125 tables, which offer both poker and California card games. With chandeliers and high-definition televisions, the building features designated areas for high-stakes players and celebrity poker tournaments, as well as a restaurant and sports bar called the Century Bar & Grill.

== See also ==
- List of casinos in California
