= Kofi Bonner =

American architect

- Born: Kumasi, Ghana
- Education: Kwame Nkrumah University of Science and Technology (BS); University of California, Berkeley (MCP, MArch)

Kofi S. Bonner is an American architect and planner widely known for the heading the redevelopment of the city of Emeryville, California. In 1995, Bonner was the deputy executive director of the San Francisco Redevelopment Agency before resigning to become the director of community & economic development for the city of Oakland, California. In 1997, he was selected as the interim city manager for the city of Oakland, California and subsequently was the chief economic policy advisor to San Francisco Mayor Willie Brown. In 1998, Bonner became executive vice president and chief administrative officer for the Cleveland Browns football organization of the National Football League. In 2004, Bonner was hired by MBNA and then in 2006 became director of urban land for Lennar. He worked as regional president at FivePoint, a position he assumed when his previous role as president in Lennar's Bay Area Urban division transitioned into FivePoint in July 2016. In this role, Bonner oversaw all land acquisition and urban development activities for FivePoint in northern California, including The San Francisco Shipyard and Candlestick Point, Treasure Island, and the Concord Naval Weapons Station.

As of 2020, Bonner is CEO of Bedrock in Detroit.

== Early life and career ==
A native of Ghana, Bonner received a Bachelor of Science degree with honors from the University of Science and Technology in Ghana. He then earned a Master of City Planning and a Master of Architecture from the University of California at Berkeley in 1987. Bonner began his career with Oakland Community Housing Inc. (OCHI) as the affordable housing developer and later transitioned to a more senior role within the Bay Area.

In 1988, Bonner was hired to replace out-going Steve Kaplan as redevelopment director for the City of Emeryville. In this capacity, he played a crucial role in planning and developing the public financing and infrastructure and attracting key businesses that led to the successful transformation of Emeryville from an aging industrial city to a mixed-use mecca for technology companies and high-end retail and housing.

Bonner later held the positions of deputy executive director of the San Francisco Redevelopment Agency and director of community and economic development for the City of Oakland. He was appointed interim city manager for the City of Oakland in 1995. He was chief economic policy advisor during the term of Mayor Willie L. Brown. Bonner oversaw major redevelopment projects and economic growth in San Francisco, including planning and implementing the redevelopment of the City’s Mission Bay neighborhood.

In 1998, Cleveland Browns President Carmen Policy offered the position of executive vice president and chief administrative officer of the Cleveland Browns to Bonner, who became the first African-American to hold such a title in the NFL. With the Browns, Bonner was responsible for the construction of the new $400 million Cleveland Browns Stadium. Bonner also sat on the NFL's Internet Committee, where he helped shape the league's internet use policy and developed the Browns' website.

In 2004, Bonner joined MBNA Corporation as a regional director and executive vice president of business development. He led all regional business development efforts until MBNA Corp. was acquired by Bank of America in 2005. Bonner returned to his city planning roots in 2005 joining Lennar Urban as regional vice president of the San Francisco Bay Area. He later transitioned to president in Lennar's Bay Area Urban division.

In 2016, Bonner became regional president of northern California as Lennar Urban was absorbed by FivePoint Communities. In 2018, he became co-chief operator officer for FivePoint Holdings. At Lennar and successor FivePoint Communities, Bonner led the development of The San Francisco Shipyard, Hunters Point/Candlestick Point, and Treasure Island in San Francisco.

Bonner is a 2011 UC Berkeley College of Environmental Design Distinguished Fellow and a Member of the Brookings Institution’s Metropolitan Leadership Council, a non-profit public Policy "think tank" organization based in Washington, DC. He is also a member of Lambda Alpha International, a Land Economics society where he received the "2010 Member of the Year" Award. He is on the boards of Bay Area Council where he co-chairs the Housing Committee, UC Berkeley’s College of Environmental Design Advisory Council, UC Berkeley Foundation's board of trustees, San Francisco Chamber of Commerce, Rock and Roll Hall of Fame Museum, and Museum of the African Diaspora.

== Career at Bedrock ==
In 2020, Bonner was named Chief Executive Officer (CEO) of Bedrock. Drawing on his background in architecture and urban development, Bonner's focus has been on assisting Detroit's revitalization by centering it as a narrative worth reconsidering.

In addition to his Detroit activities, Bonner's work as CEO of Bedrock has extended to Cleveland. In 2022, Bedrock announced its partnership with the city of Cleveland for a comprehensive redevelopment of the Cuyahoga Riverfront. Dubbed the “Cuyahoga Riverfront Master Plan,” the project embodies Bedrock’s commitment to redeveloping urban cores and downtown areas, transforming more than 35 acres of public and private land into apartments, offices, and green space. This long-term endeavor is projected to be 20 years in the making.

Bonner is married and has three children.

== Sources ==
- "Emeryville Raids Oakland". The Montclarion. 1995. p. 2.
