= SeeqPod =

SeeqPod, Inc.
- Type: Private
- Industry: Search engine
- Founded: July 2005
- Defunct: 2010
- Headquarters: Emeryville, California, United States
- Key people: Kasian Franks, Founder; Raf Podowski, Founder; Shekhar Lodha, Founder; Mike Muldoon, CTO
- Number of employees: 20
- Website: www.seeqpod.com

SeeqPod was a search and recommendation engine specifically for indexing and finding playable search results including audio, video, podcasts and Wikipedia articles that were publicly accessible on the World Wide Web. The site claimed to have indexed more than 13 million individual tracks and files. On April 1, 2009, SeeqPod filed for bankruptcy protection under chapter 11. The service is currently unavailable. In August 2010, Intertrust Technologies announced that it had acquired all software and patents developed by SeeqPod, Inc. via the Chapter 7 Bankruptcy proceeding. Intertrust did not acquire the domain names used by the company.

== History ==
SeeqPod's search and recommendation technology is anchored by a biomimetic algorithm originally developed at the Lawrence Berkeley National Lab under the name GenoPharm.

GenoPharm’s unique algorithm mimics the way a biologist searches through biomedical literature for connections between genes. The system, meant to serve as an add-on to a biologists brain, has allowed researches to find indirect connections between genes and therapies that had never been noticed before. This expedited the research process, allowing biologists to do in minutes what normally would have taken days.

The unique ability to understand complex, hidden relationships between genes and diseases was soon applied to playable media content on the internet under the name SeeqPod.

Since SeeqPod is powered by the GenoPharm algorithm, the engine solves search queries by linking relevant information automatically from each analyzed source of information, creating connections similar to how the human brain might. This is in contrast to the traditional search engines, which rely mostly on familiar keyword associations.

R&D Magazine recognized the development of SeeqPod's search technology by naming it the winner of the 2008 R&D 100 Award in Software, dubbed the 'Oscars of Innovation' by The Chicago Tribune.

A number of record companies have attempted to sue SeeqPod, including Warner Music Group, Elektra Records, Rhino Records, and most recently EMI and Capitol Records. In addition, a multibillion-dollar lawsuit was filed by EMI and Capitol Records against Kasian Franks as the founder of SeeqPod. However, the suit from EMI and Capitol Records was thrown out of court.

Due to economic conditions and litigation, SeeqPod filed for bankruptcy protection on April 1, 2009. Around this time, the company looked at changing its business model by potentially licensing its technology to third-party developers. Some speculated that SeeqPod had been purchased by Microsoft or that the company has licensed SeeqPod's software. As of December 2011, the SeeqPod service is unavailable, it no longer redirects to another website.

SeeqPod founder and CEO/CVO, Kasian Franks has recently started another company, Mimvi Inc., which uses specialized algorithms to automatically aggregate, re-rank, organize and personalize digital content on the Internet and on mobile devices. Mimvi focuses on personalized search, discovery and recommendation technology for video content including music, travel and comedy. This technology is also applied to a consumer search engine that serves as a "Google" for discovering mobile apps for the iPhone/iPod/iPad, Android, Symbian and Windows Mobile platforms. Though the service is currently in private alpha mode, the company will be publicly traded starting in the end of February 2010.

After acquisition talks with a number of companies, it was announced on August 30, 2010, that SeeqPod's technology assets were acquired by Sony's Intertrust division. In April 2010, Bloson, a social network with the purpose of raising money for charitable causes acquired specifically SeeqPod’s domain and the contact information of its user base, which equals around 4 million users.

== Criticism ==
On January 18, 2008, Warner Music Group, along with Elektra Records and Rhino Records, filed a complaint against SeeqPod in the U.S. District Court Central District of California. Warner Music Group alleges that SeeqPod is liable for copyright infringement by linking to sites containing unauthorized and illegal copies of copyrighted music. The complaint points to SeeqPod’s ability to search for a particular type of content – music – that is copyrighted. SeeqPod is claiming safe harbor under Title II of the 1998 Digital Millennium Copyright Act (DMCA), the Online Copyright Infringement Liability Limitation Act ("OCILLA"), which creates a safe harbor for online service providers (OSPs, including ISPs) against copyright liability if they adhere to and qualify for certain prescribed safe harbor guidelines and promptly block access to allegedly infringing material (or remove such material from their systems) if they receive a notification claiming infringement from a copyright holder or the copyright holder's agent. In February 2009, Capitol Records and EMI filed a complaint against SeeqPod and its search engine technology.

While similar cases have been filed against YouTube, MP3Tunes.com, Veoh, PornoTube, and Divx/Stage 6, this case is particularly important as it directly tests how copyright law applies to search engines. Unlike the before-mentioned cases, which involve hosting copyrighted material, SeeqPod is the first to be sued for merely searching and presenting media available on other people's servers.

== See also ==
- Grooveshark
- imeem
- Last.fm
- Pandora (music service)
- Songza
- jamendo
