= Online video analytics =

Online video analytics (also known as Web video analytics) is the measurement, analysis and reporting of videos viewed online. It is used for the purposes of understanding the consumption patterns (behavioral analysis) and optimizing viewing experience (quality of service analysis).

Online video analytics differs from traditional television analytics because it can be measured using census-based methods instead of panel-based metrics. Every event that a viewer does while watching a video online can be captured and analyzed precisely.

A research done on YouTube videos suggests that: the more information given by the title/description of a video, the less views it generate; the more intensive negative emotion of the title of the video, the more views it generate.

== Use-cases and metrics of interest ==
=== Behavioral (or usage) analysis ===
The study of consumption patterns helps video publishers gain insights into the end-user preferences. These insights are then used to drive monetization by ad placements, and to tailor future videos to maximize viewer engagement. It aims to answer questions such as:

- Which are the most popular videos?
- Where do the viewers come from?
- How long do viewers watch a particular video?
- Do they take any action during or after watching the videos (e.g. share, embed, like)?
- Which portion of the video is most popular?
- Which ad placements are most effective - pre-roll, mid-roll or post-roll?

The following metrics are of real interest both for on-demand and live videos:

- Unique Viewers - per day or month for on-demand, per event or show for live
- Plays - number of times the video was started (in most analyses, it is beneficial to exclude plays with less than a few seconds of play duration)
- Audience Size - number of viewers watching the content at any given point in time
- Play Duration - time spent consuming the videos
- Ratios of these metrics - e.g. Plays per Viewer, Play Duration per Play, Play Duration per Viewer

Along with other obvious dimensions (like Country, Browser, Device etc.), a particularly interesting dimension is Stream Position (or Video Portion). Measured as a percentage of video length, for a particular video, Plays by Stream Position indicates which portion of the video is watched how many times. It helps with analysis such as, 40% of the viewers drop off from the video after watching only 25%.

=== Behavioral (or usage) analysis ===
Visual analysis tools integrated into online video platforms are designed to transform multiple viewing experiences into a graphic form, in order to understand the audience and optimizing video content performance.

A graphical summary that helps to figure out how viewers are engaged with a specific video is called a Video Heatmap. Unlike heatmaps used in website analytics, which highlight different areas of a web page depending on the click-through rate, a video heatmap aggregates stats from every viewing session and calculates an average engagement rate (also known as watch rate) throughout the entire video. Depending on the platform, a video hitman can be represented in a form of a graph or a colored timeline.

User Screen contains personal information related to a specific viewer, such as location (country), IP address, operating system (OS), web browser version, first and last view dates, and average engagement. It may also include information obtained from email marketing software which is used to distribute video messages: a viewer's email address, first and last name.

Live Feed shows an overview of everyone watching the videos to the publisher in the real-time mode. The feed allows to expand detailed viewer stats or to jump to an individual user screen.

=== Quality of Experience (or service) analysis ===
The study of online video viewer experience helps online video platforms identify shortcomings in their network infrastructure and to tweak the quality of their source content to better suit the end-users' connection speeds and devices.

This theme deals with understanding the effect of bad quality on usage. After clicking the play button, do viewers wait for more than 5s before the video starts playing? The interesting metrics for this theme are:

- Availability - percentage of times the video playback start successfully
- Start Up Time - time between the play button click and playback start
- Rebuffers - number of times and the duration of interruptions due to re-buffering
- Bitrate - average bits per second of video playback. The higher the bitrate, the better the experience

Network and connection speed are among the most important dimensions. Measuring the abandonment rate (percentage of viewers dropping off) due to bad quality (higher start up time, higher rebuffering or lower bitrate etc.) is of particular interest. Quality of experience analysis helps companies determine their network infrastructure and encoding requirements.

== See also ==
- Vidmeter
- TubeMogul
- BigChampagne
