= Emeryville, California =

City in California, United States

- City
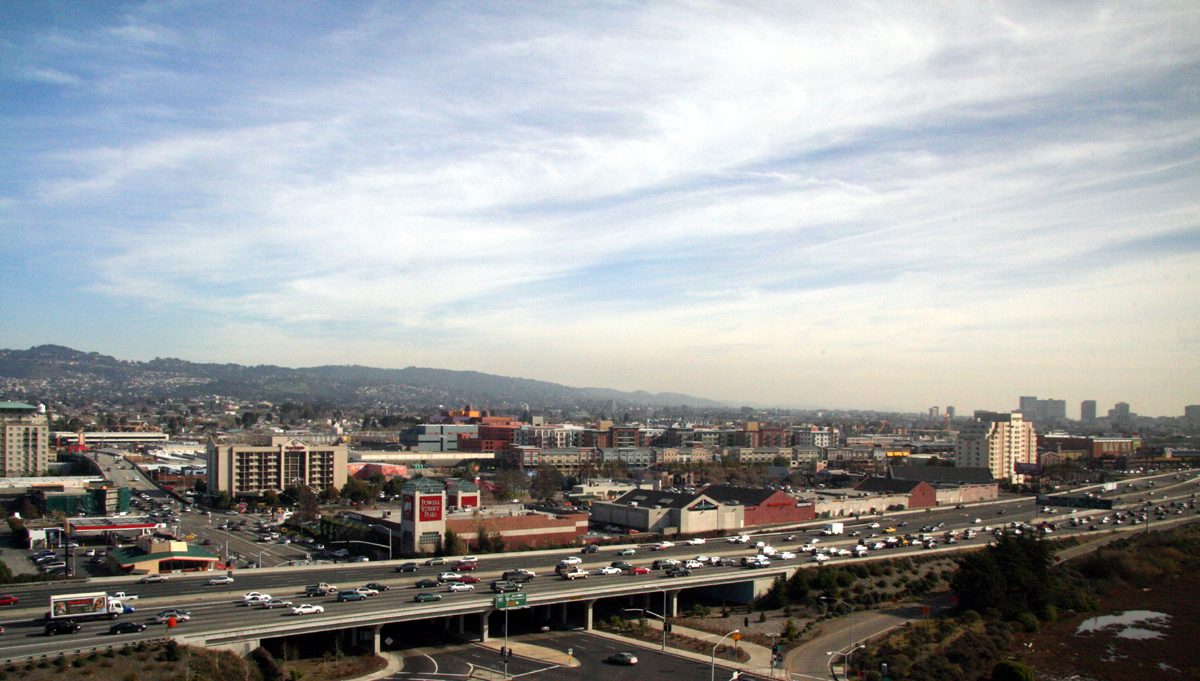
- Emeryville as seen from a local highrise hotel

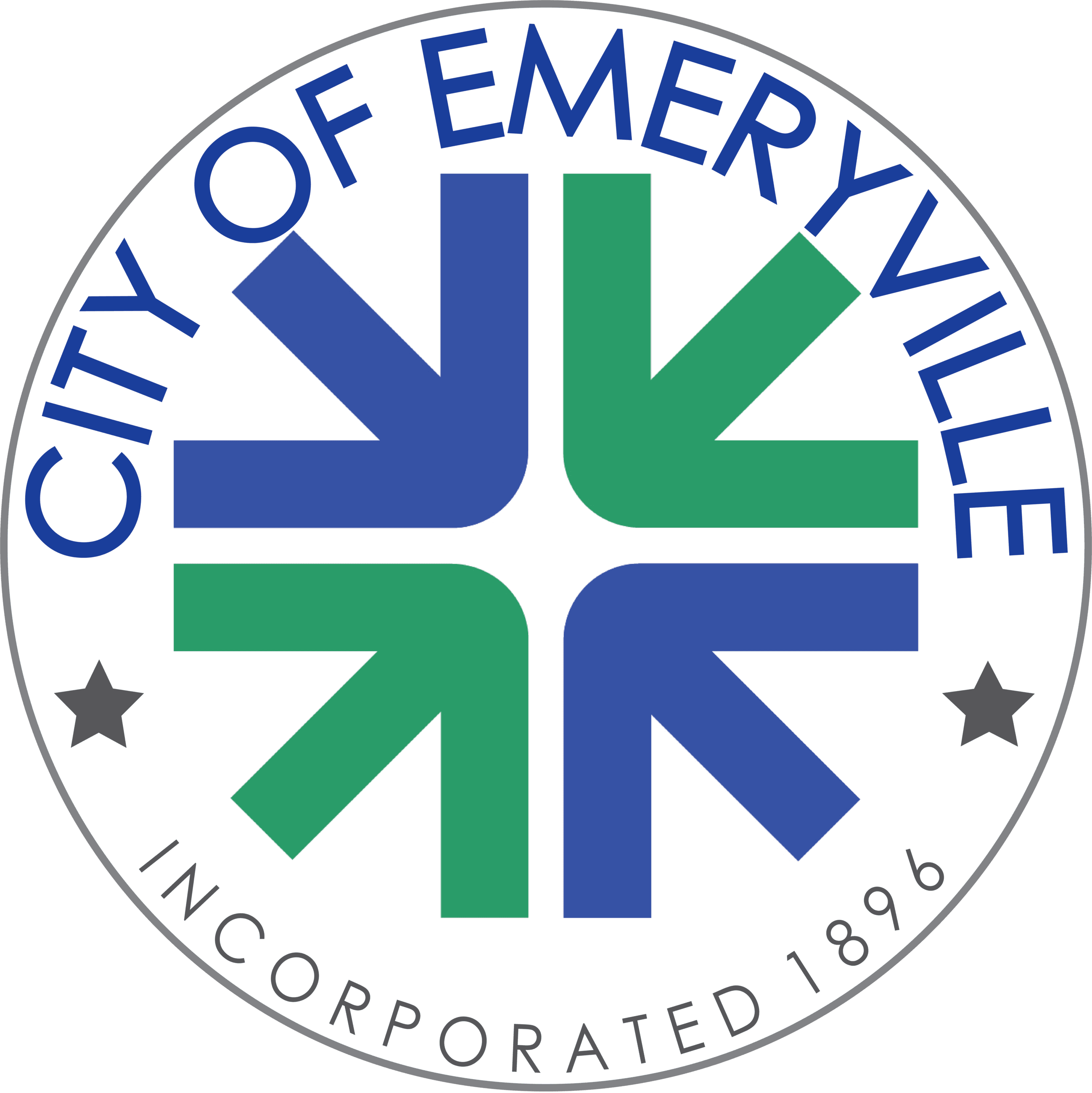
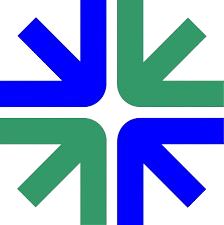
- Seal Logo
- Interactive map of Emeryville, California
- Location in California Emeryville (California) Emeryville (the United States)
- Coordinates: 37°49′53″N 122°17′07″W
- Country: United States
- State: California
- County: Alameda
- Incorporated: December 8, 1896

Government
  - Mayor: Sukhdeep Kaur
  - State Senate: Jesse Arreguín (D)
  - State Assembly: Mia Bonta (D)
  - U. S. Congress: Lateefah Simon (D)

Area
  - Total: 2.24 sq mi (5.8 km^{2})
  - Land: 1.27 sq mi (3.3 km^{2})
  - Water: 0.96 sq mi (2.5 km^{2}) 43.11%
- Elevation: 23 ft (7.0 m)

Population (2020)
  - Total: 12,905
  - Density: 10,137.5/sq mi (3,914.1/km^{2})
- Time zone: UTC-8 (Pacific Standard Time Zone)
  - Summer (DST): UTC-7 (Pacific Daylight Time)
- ZIP code: 94608
- Area codes: 510, 341
- FIPS code: 06-22594
- GNIS feature IDs: 1658499, 2410436
- Website: www.emeryville.org

Emeryville is a city in northwestern Alameda County, California, United States. It lies in a corridor between the cities of Berkeley and Oakland, with a border on the shore of San Francisco Bay. The resident population was 12,905 as of 2020. Its proximity to San Francisco, the Bay Bridge, the University of California, Berkeley, and Silicon Valley has been a catalyst for recent economic growth.

It is the home to Pixar Animation Studios, Peet's Coffee, the Center for Investigative Reporting, Alternative Tentacles and Clif Bar. In addition, several well-known tech and software companies are located in Emeryville: LeapFrog, Sendmail, MobiTV, Novartis (formerly Chiron before April 2006), and BigFix (now HCL). Emeryville attracts many weekday commuters due to its position as a regional employment center.

Emeryville has some features of an edge city; however, it is located within the inner urban core of Oakland/the greater East Bay. It was industrialized before the First World War.

== History ==
=== Early history ===
Before the colonization of the area by Spain in 1776, this area was long the site of indigenous settlements. The historic Ohlone Native Americans encountered the Spaniards and later European colonists. They thrived on the rich resources of the bayside location: gathered clams from the mudflats, oysters from the rocky areas, caught fish, and hunted a variety of game. In addition, women gathered acorns from the local oak trees, roots, and fruit. The Ohlone discarded clam and oyster shells in a single place, over time creating a huge mound, now known as the Emeryville Shellmound.

During the Spanish and Mexican eras, colonists constructed a small wharf near the mouth of Temescal Creek adjacent to the shellmound. The wharf served the Peralta family's Rancho San Antonio. It was used for loading cattle hides, the principal product of the ranch, onto lighters, and transferring them to ocean-going ships, including New England–bound schooners.

Cattle were a major part of the economy into the American era, when numerous meat packing plants were established along the bayshore in Emeryville between 67th and 63rd streets, in an area called "Butchertown". The cattle processed here were raised in nearby ranches and farms, and brought in by rail or barge. The odors from the corrals and slaughterhouses were notorious and often mentioned in local newspapers of the 19th and early 20th century.

Emeryville's first post office opened in 1884.

The Town of Emeryville was incorporated December 2, 1896. It was named after Joseph Stickney Emery, who came during the California Gold Rush and acquired large tracts of land in what became known as "Emery's". In 1884, Emery was president of a narrow-gauge railroad called the California and Nevada Railroad. The railroad was originally intended to extend from Oakland, through Emery's (at the time, an unincorporated settlement along the bayshore) and east across the Sierra Nevada to the gold mining town of Bodie, California. From Bodie the railroad would extend east through Nevada to a connection with the Denver & Rio Grande Railroad. Despite these goals, the railroad was completed only from Oakland to Orinda. Its right-of-way was sold to the Santa Fe Railway. The Santa Fe constructed a rail yard and passenger depot below San Pablo between 41st Street and Yerba Buena Avenue. Although located in Emeryville, when the depot opened in 1902, it was called "Oakland" after the larger community.

=== 20th century and beyond ===
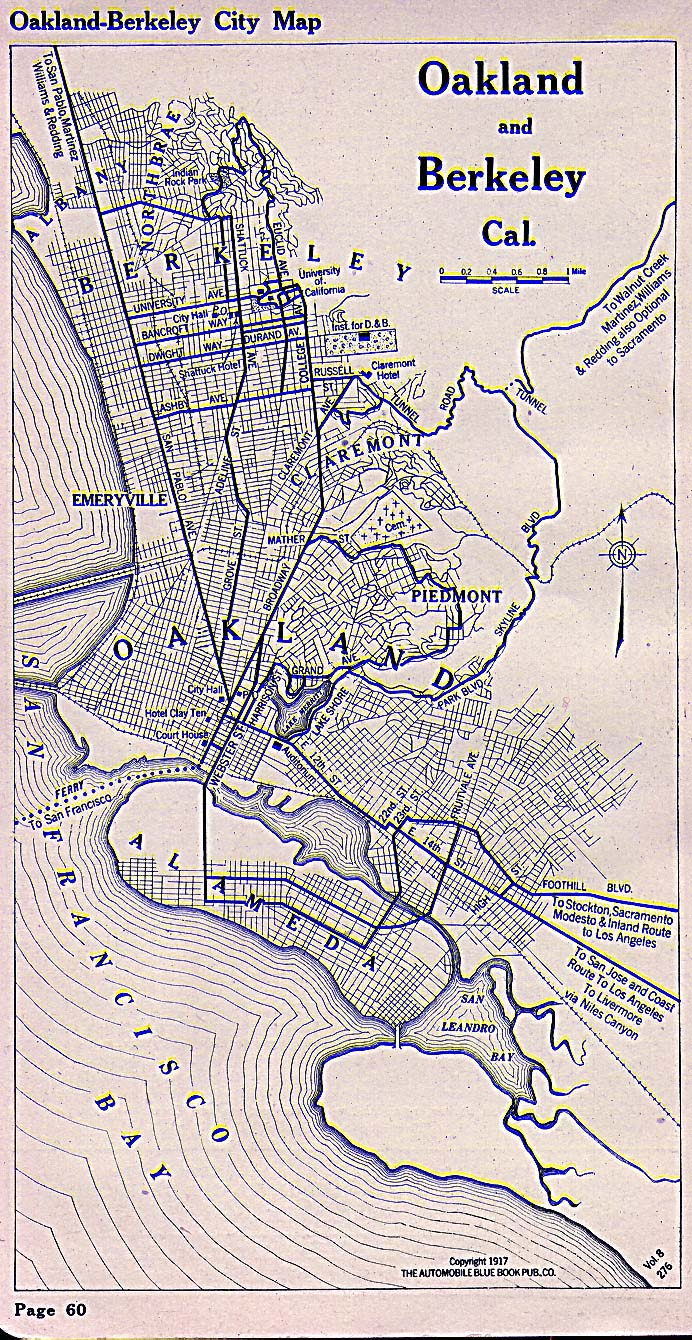
Map of Oakland and Berkeley area in 1917; Emeryville is noted between them on the map.

The Key System, a local transit company, acquired the general offices of the California and Nevada and its nascent pier into San Francisco Bay. Key developed the pier to reach nearly to Yerba Buena Island. The Key System established its main rail yard adjacent to the yard of the Santa Fe in a large tract west of San Pablo Avenue. It was in the vicinity of Yerba Buena Avenue (so named because the island was visible in line with the thoroughfare). The Key System's main power plant, used to drive its electric streetcars and commuter trains, was constructed adjacent to the city limits with Oakland. The immense smokestack was a local landmark for decades, surviving until being damaged in the Loma Prieta earthquake of 1989. It was demolished for safety reasons shortly thereafter.

The old Key System mainline to the pier, and later, to the Bay Bridge, ran in a subway below Beach Street and the Southern Pacific mainline near the power plant. That subway survives. Today it is used as a private entrance to the main sewage treatment plant of East Bay Municipal Utility District (EBMUD, the water utility serving Oakland and many surrounding cities).

In the late 1980s and early 1990s, after the Santa Fe spun off its real estate development arm, this company acquired the rail yards and shops of the Key System and Santa Fe. This real estate was redeveloped by what was called the Catellus Development Corporation, as a shopping center and multi-unit residential district.

In the late 19th century, the city developed a large park around the shellmound. This included two dance pavilions, one of which was built on top of the shellmound. The Oakland Trotting Park, for Standardbred horse racing, was built nearby at the junction of the Berkeley Branch line with the mainline of the Southern Pacific. The old Emeryville Arena was torn down in February 1920, to make way for a new idea for a new venue to revive the sport of dog racing, but using what the Oakland Tribune described as an "automatic rabbit". On May 29, 1920, the first greyhound racing track to employ a mechanical lure in place of a live rabbit opened in Emeryville.

In the early 20th century, Emeryville was as well known for its gambling houses and bordellos as it was for its booming industrial sector. Earl Warren, then Alameda County district attorney, later California governor and Chief Justice of the United States, described it as "the rottenest city on the Pacific Coast". During Prohibition and the Great Depression, Emeryville was a site of numerous speakeasies, racetracks and brothels; it became known as a somewhat lawless red light center. Today's popular local restaurant, The Townhouse, was operated as a speakeasy during Prohibition. The Oaks Card Club operates today as a legal gambling establishment on San Pablo Avenue.

Emeryville was the site of Oaks Park, the home turf of the Pacific Coast League's Oakland Oaks. The ballpark was located on the block bounded by San Pablo, 45th Street and Park Street (the fourth side was Watts Street). The site is now partly empty and fenced off. It is overlapped by Pixar Studios. Pixar's main gate (on Park Street) lies directly on the old segment of Watts Street. The stadium did not front directly on San Pablo, where a strip of various small commercial buildings stood. They were replaced by the current, one-story commercial building housing several chain businesses.

During World War II, Emeryville was the southern terminus of the Shipyard Railway, a specially constructed electric rail line operated by the Key System to transport defense workers to the Kaiser Shipyards in Richmond. The station was on the west side of San Pablo Avenue on the Key's yard property. The tracks led to San Pablo Avenue, where they were merged into existing streetcar tracks.

From the late 19th into the early 20th century, Emeryville continued development as an industrial city. Joining the meat-packing plants were the Judson Iron Works and the Sherwin-Williams paint company. From 1939 until the 1970s, the Sherwin-Williams plant roof featured a massive animated neon sign showing a can of red paint tilting, spilling, and covering a globe of the earth — with the slogan "Cover the Earth". It was a familiar sight to eastbound motorists on the Bay Bridge. The sign was dismantled in the summer of 1977.

For decades the city was also the location of Shell Development, the research arm of Shell Oil Company; it relocated in 1972 to Houston, Texas. A large scrap metal yard (part of the Judson Steel mill) and its distinctive neon "Judson Steel" sign were visible for decades from the Eastshore Freeway until the mid-1980s. A large facility of the Pacific Intermountain Express (PIE) trucking firm was also visible. A heavy truck manufacturing division of what was formerly International Harvester, later Navistar, was located in Emeryville. One of its more popular over-the-road semi-truck models, the International DCO-405, became commonly and affectionately known as an "Emeryville".

By the late 1960s, industries were beginning to move away from Emeryville. With the loss of jobs, the city began to decline. This began to change in the mid-1970s starting with the development of the marina section of Emeryville. The Judson steel mill abruptly shut down in the fall of 1986, after more than 100 years of operation, in the wake of declining profits and contentious labor negotiations.

==== Post-industrial redevelopment ====
By the late 1980s, a large shopping area had begun to develop north and south of the Powell Street corridor. Additionally, the Chiron Corporation (now Novartis), a major biotechnology company, established its headquarters just south of the old junction of the SP mainline tracks and the old Berkeley branchline (Shellmound Junction) at the end of Stanford Avenue, the site of the old Shellmound trotting course.

Following the Loma Prieta earthquake in 1989, a new Amtrak depot was built in Emeryville to replace the former 16th Street Station in West Oakland. It had been deteriorating even before it was seriously damaged by the quake. The Emeryville station serves Amtrak's California Zephyr, Coast Starlight, Gold Runner, and Capitol Corridor trains. The California Zephyr originates here with service daily to Chicago, Illinois via Salt Lake City, Utah and Denver, Colorado. Buses link the station with San Francisco.

In the late 1980s the Emeryville Public Market opened; this farmers' market also features up to twenty restaurants.

By the 1990s, the former tracts of the Santa Fe and Key System yards were redeveloped as a large shopping and residential area, as was the Shellmound corridor. Development of these areas included major roadwork, with the extension of 40th Street. The work included construction of a large overpass across the Southern Pacific (now Union Pacific) railroad tracks; it connected 40th Street to an extension of Shellmound Street, creating a single thoroughfare linking two sections of the new Emeryville. On the northern stretch of Shellmound Street, the Emery Marketplace and a movie multiplex were built. In 2007, the western end of Yerba Buena Avenue was linked with the northern end of the Mandela Parkway, creating a new through route between Emeryville and West Oakland.

In 2001, the city contracted developer Madison Marquette to build a new shopping center, the Bay Street Shopping Center. It was to be built on the site of a defunct paint factory. But this was a historic site of an Ohlone village and burial ground. Madison Marquette developers worked with archaeologists and Ohlone tribe representatives in order to avoid disturbing the human remains. The tribe approved reinterment of some remains at an undisclosed location on the site. The completed mall displays photographs of the historic shellmound, but it does not mention the burial grounds. An Ohlone representative said they believed the information would make shoppers there uncomfortable.

In February 2025, Sutter Health announced plans for a major healthcare expansion in Emeryville with a US$1 billion medical campus. This project will repurpose two existing buildings—located at 5555 Hollis Street and 5300 Chiron Street—as outpatient centers and specialty clinics set to open in 2028, and will include a new flagship hospital at 53rd and Horton Streets scheduled to open in 2033. The new hospital (expected to replace the Alta Bates campus in Berkeley) will feature at least 200 beds, emergency services, an intensive care unit, and private patient rooms. Designed to address the growing healthcare needs of the East Bay, the development is expected to boost Sutter Health's patient capacity from roughly 480,000 to 800,000, and it is anticipated to have a significant positive economic impact on Emeryville by creating hundreds of jobs and stimulating local business growth.

== Geography ==
According to the United States Census Bureau, the city has a total area of 2.2 square miles (5.7 km^{2}), of which 1.3 square miles (3.4 km^{2}) is land and 1.0 square mile (2.6 km^{2}) (43.11%) is water. Named Watergate, the Emeryville marina is home to a mixed-use development, including two marinas (one public, the other private), a park, a residential condominium community known as Watergate, a business park with several office buildings, and several restaurants.

=== Mudflats and other environmental features ===
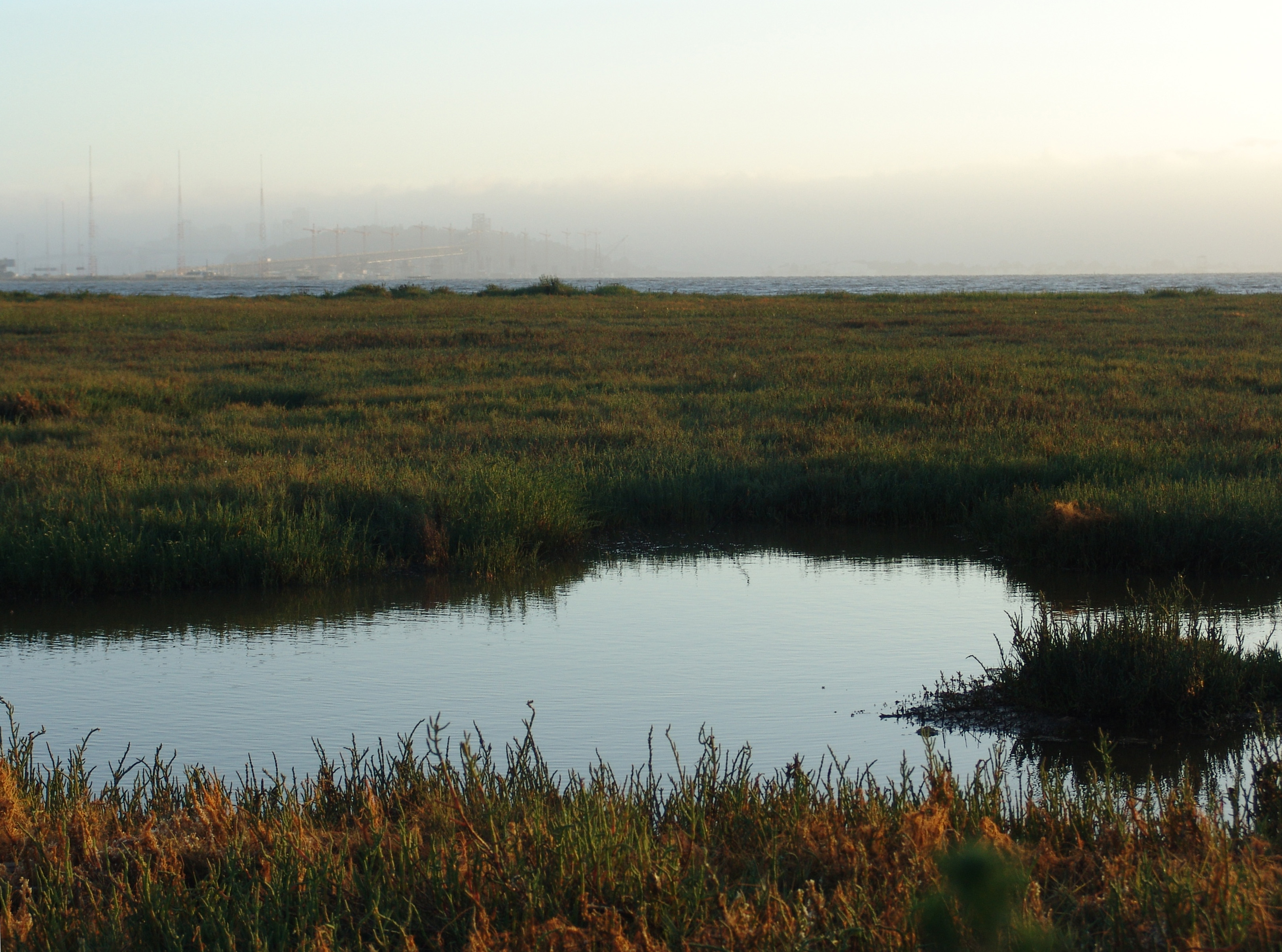
Emeryville's mudflats

At one time, the Emeryville Mudflats were famous for their stench. In the 19th and early 20th century, this was caused by the effluent from the "Butchertown" area, where several meat-packing plants operated along the bayshore. They also dumped stripped carcasses in the bay here. Later, untreated sewage from Emeryville, Oakland, and Berkeley flowed directly into the bay over the mudflats, producing hydrogen sulfide gas, particularly noticeable on warm days. In the 1950s the East Bay Municipal Utility District constructed a regional sewage treatment plant near the eastern terminus of the San Francisco–Oakland Bay Bridge, which, for the most part, cured the noxious problem.

The Emeryville Mudflats became notable in the 1960s and 1970s for public art, erected (with neither permission nor compensation) from driftwood timbers and boards by professional and amateur artists and art students from local high schools, UC Berkeley, the California College of Arts and Crafts and the Free University of Berkeley. The mudflats were even featured in the 1971 film Harold and Maude. These unsanctioned works were admired by some drivers heading westbound on the San Francisco–Oakland Bay Bridge from Interstate 80.

In the late 1990s, the sculptures and materials were removed in the interest of establishing a more natural and undisturbed marshland for the nurturing of wildlife. This process continues around the bay in many other wetlands, former diked grazing fields, and salt production evaporation ponds.

Historically, Emeryville had been the location of a number of heavy industrial uses such as Judson Steel, whose properties were developed by bringing in waste and construction debris fill from San Francisco in the early 1900s. Correspondingly much of the underlying soil contained heavy metals, hydrocarbons and other soil contaminants. Much of this contamination was removed in the 1980s when the considerable wave of redevelopment occurred. The population had increased to almost 7,000 by the year 2000. Since then, the population has continued to grow and is estimated by General Plan projects a population of 16,600 by 2030. In addition, the city is home to about 20,000 current jobs; this number is projected to increase to about 30,000 by 2030.

=== Climate ===
Emeryville has a Mediterranean climate, similar to nearby Oakland.

== Demographics ==
Historical population
| Census | Pop. | Note | %± |
|---|---|---|---|
| 1890 | 228 | | — |
| 1900 | 1,016 | | 345.6% |
| 1910 | 2,613 | | 157.2% |
| 1920 | 2,390 | | −8.5% |
| 1930 | 2,336 | | −2.3% |
| 1940 | 2,521 | | 7.9% |
| 1950 | 2,889 | | 14.6% |
| 1960 | 2,686 | | −7.0% |
| 1970 | 2,681 | | −0.2% |
| 1980 | 3,714 | | 38.5% |
| 1990 | 5,740 | | 54.6% |
| 2000 | 6,882 | | 19.9% |
| 2010 | 10,080 | | 46.5% |
| 2020 | 12,905 | | 28.0% |
| 2025 (est.) | 13,251 | ▲ | 2.7% |
U.S. Decennial Census; 1860–1870 1880-1890; 1900 1910 1920; 1930 1940 1950; 1960 1970 1980; 1990 2000 2010; 2020

=== 2020 census ===
As of the 2020 census, Emeryville had a population of 12,905 and a population density of 10,137.5 inhabitants per square mile (3,914.1/km^{2}). 100.0% of residents lived in urban areas, while 0.0% lived in rural areas.

The age distribution was 10.8% under the age of 18, 8.0% aged 18 to 24, 49.9% aged 25 to 44, 19.6% aged 45 to 64, and 11.7% who were 65 years of age or older. The median age was 35.0 years. For every 100 females, there were 94.7 males, and for every 100 females age 18 and over there were 93.8 males age 18 and over.

The Census reported that 97.6% of the population lived in households, 2.4% lived in non-institutionalized group quarters, and no one was institutionalized. There were 6,928 households, out of which 14.2% included children under the age of 18. Of all households, 25.5% were married-couple households, 11.2% were cohabiting couple households, 34.5% had a female householder with no partner present, and 28.8% had a male householder with no partner present. 45.6% of households were one person, and 11.3% were one person aged 65 or older. The average household size was 1.82. There were 2,575 families (37.2% of all households).

There were 7,525 housing units at an average density of 5,911.2 units per square mile (2,282.3 units/km^{2}). Of all housing units, 7.9% were vacant; the homeowner vacancy rate was 1.4% and the rental vacancy rate was 7.0%. Of occupied housing units, 29.7% were owner-occupied and 70.3% were occupied by renters.

Racial composition as of the 2020 census
| Race | Number | Percent |
|---|---|---|
| White | 4,796 | 37.2% |
| Black or African American | 2,015 | 15.6% |
| American Indian and Alaska Native | 76 | 0.6% |
| Asian | 3,965 | 30.7% |
| Native Hawaiian and Other Pacific Islander | 54 | 0.4% |
| Some other race | 617 | 4.8% |
| Two or more races | 1,382 | 10.7% |
| Hispanic or Latino (of any race) | 1,435 | 11.1% |

=== 2023 American Community Survey ===
In 2023, the US Census Bureau estimated that 31.8% of the population were foreign-born. Of all people aged 5 or older, 62.6% spoke only English at home, 6.7% spoke Spanish, 9.1% spoke other Indo-European languages, 19.3% spoke Asian or Pacific Islander languages, and 2.3% spoke other languages. Of those aged 25 or older, 97.8% were high school graduates and 74.9% had a bachelor's degree.

The median household income was $120,302, and the per capita income was $93,433. About 5.3% of families and 9.6% of the population were below the poverty line.

== Politics ==
According to the California Secretary of State, as of February 10, 2019, Emeryville has 6,654 registered voters. Of those, 4,152 (62.4%) are registered Democrats, 306 (4.6%) are registered Republicans, and 1,914 (28.8%) have declined to state a political party.

== Schools ==
Emery Unified School District serves the students in Emeryville and parts of Oakland. Its schools, both in the same site, are Anna Yates Elementary School and Emery Secondary School.

The East Bay German International School (EBGIS) is a German immersion school operating located in the former Anna Yates school campus since 2017. The school was founded in 2007 in Berkeley. It reorganized as an independent school in 2018 after being operated by the German International School of Silicon Valley.

Ex'pression College for Digital Arts was a private, for-profit college which operated in Emeryville from 1999 until its closure in 2022.

== Government ==
The city uses a council–city manager system. Emeryville City Council is the main legislative body and the mayor does not hold any formal authority separate from the council. The responsibilities of the council include adopting the city budget and setting city policy. Every year, one mayor and one vice mayor are chosen from and by the members of the council.

== Economy ==
As of July 1, 2019, businesses with 55 or fewer employees working within the geographic boundaries of the city must pay each employee at least $16.30 per hour. Large businesses with 56 or more employees must pay the same rate (previously the rate differed based on employee count). Many businesses have set up headquarters in the city. Companies based in Emeryville include:

- Alibris Inc., an online supplier and retailer of used and rare books founded in 1997 by Martin Manley and Richard Weatherford.
- Alternative Tentacles, an independent record label launched in 1979, specializing in punk and alternative music.
- Amyris, a biotech integrated renewable products company that is enabling the world's leading brands to achieve sustainable growth.
- Bayer, formerly Novartis Biopharma division (Chiron Corporation prior to April 2006): a biotech and researcher/manufacturer of biopharmaceuticals.
- Berkeley Research Group, LLC (BRG), a services and consulting firm co-founded by David Teece.
- BigFix (IBM), a software company that provides endpoint management services.
- Bionovo, a biotechnology company focused on the discovery and development of drugs to treat cancer and women's health issues.
- BrandAds, an online video analytics company.
- The Center for Investigative Reporting, a nonprofit investigative journalism organization.
- Cetus Corporation, (acquired by Chiron in 1991) one of the first biotechnology companies. Produced pharmaceuticals Betaseron and Proleukin. They also developed the PCR process, which won a Nobel Prize for its inventor in 1993.
- Clif Bar, a natural foods maker.
- Electronic Arts, the world's largest video game maker, had Will Wright's Spore development team Maxis based here until March 2015.
- Gracenote, owned by Nielsen Holdings, maintains and licenses an Internet-accessible database containing information about the contents of audio compact discs.
- Grocery Outlet, a discount supermarket chain.
- Innovative Interfaces, Inc, a supplier of integrated library system software.
- Kodak Gallery (formerly Ofoto.com), an Internet digital photo service whose products include photo prints and gifts.
- LeapFrog, an educational toy company best known for its LeapPad, a paper-based electronic reading toy.
- Match Analysis, the maker of the leading video and statistical analysis system for professional soccer.
- Peet's Coffee, specialty coffee roaster and retailer.
- Pixar Animation Studios, a major animation and computer graphics firm known for award-winning shorts, and feature films. Bought by The Walt Disney Company in 2006.
- SeeqPod, a search and recommendation web site.
- ZipRealty, an internet-based realty company.

=== Retail centers ===
As part of an urban renewal project, several shopping centers opened in the late 1990s next to the intersection of Interstate highways 80 and 580, capitalizing on Emeryville's access to San Francisco as well as to East Bay customers. A new retail and residential development named Bay Street Emeryville now sits along Highway 80 and is home to many stores and restaurants.

=== Top employers ===
According to the city's 2022 Annual Comprehensive Financial Report, the top employers in the city are:

| # | Employer | # of Employees |
|---|---|---|
| 1 | Pixar | 1,465 |
| 2 | Amyris | 595 |
| 3 | AC Transit | 435 |
| 4 | Grocery Outlet Headquarters | 427 |
| 5 | Clif Bar | 343 |
| 6 | Grifols | 265 |
| 6 | IKEA | 265 |
| 8 | Peet's Coffee | 255 |
| 9 | Oaks Card Club | 217 |
| 10 | City of Emeryville | 170 |

== Transportation ==
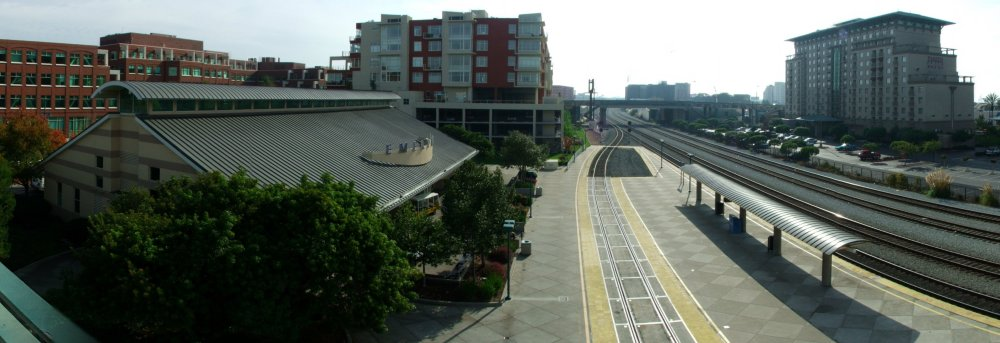
Emeryville Amtrak station

The Emeryville Amtrak station was completed in 1994 and serves four intercity rail lines:

- California Zephyr, as the western terminus of interstate service to Chicago
- Capitol Corridor, which is an intrastate commuter rail train between San Jose and Auburn via Sacramento
- Coast Starlight, which offers interstate service between Seattle and Los Angeles
- Gold Runner, an intrastate train between Sacramento and Bakersfield; Emeryville is on the branch to Oakland via Stockton

Emeryville is the primary San Francisco Bay Area station/stop for the two interstate lines, serving approximately 500,000 passengers annually; it replaced a station in West Oakland that was damaged in the 1989 Loma Prieta earthquake and was designed by Heller Manus Architects. Amtrak does not provide direct rail service to any city on the San Francisco Peninsula, including San Francisco. San Francisco passengers use a bus connector to Emeryville station, routed over the Bay Bridge, with a stop near the Salesforce Transit Center.

Bay Area Rapid Transit (BART) is a commuter/metro heavy rail system which connects San Francisco, Oakland, and San Jose in the greater Bay Area. The closest BART station is MacArthur station in Oakland, approximately 2 mi (3.2 km) east of the Amtrak station. Richmond station, approximately 7 1/2 mi (12.1 km) north of Emeryville, and Oakland Coliseum station, approximately 9 3/4 mi (15.7 km), both provide direct connections between Amtrak and BART.

Public transit bus service for Emeryville is provided by AC Transit, which covers the East Bay counties of Alameda and Contra Costa. To supplement the local bus service, the city operates a free shuttle service called Emery Go-Round with 15 minute headways on weekdays; it serves MacArthur BART, the Amtrak station, the Bay Street shops, the Watergate condominium complex and nearby marina, and other locations throughout the city and into Berkeley.

Freeway access to Emeryville is provided by a key section of Interstate 80, just north of where that freeway meets Interstate 880 and Interstate 580 in a major interchange known as the MacArthur Maze.

Emeryville also maintains a small marina with limited services. It is the location of the Emeryville Ferry Terminal. The San Francisco Bay Trail runs through the marina. The marina has a public park.

There is a standing citizen Bicycle Pedestrian Advisory Committee.

== Notable people ==
- Kofi S. Bonner, architect
- Draymond Green, professional basketball player
- Lateefah Simon, U.S. representative
