= Brooks, California =

Brooks
- Census-designated place
- Location in California Brooks (the United States)
- Coordinates: 38°44′30″N 122°08′53″W
- Country: United States
- State: California
- County: Yolo

Area
  - Total: 4.31 sq mi (11.15 km^{2})
  - Land: 4.31 sq mi (11.15 km^{2})
  - Water: 0 sq mi (0.00 km^{2})
- Elevation: 341 ft (104 m)

Population (2020)
  - Total: 31
  - Density: 7.2/sq mi (2.78/km^{2})
- FIPS code: 06-08506

Brooks is an unincorporated community and census-designated place (CDP) in Yolo County, California, United States, located in the Capay Valley in the northwest of the county. Brooks' ZIP Code is 95606 and its area code 530. The Yocha Dehe Wintun Nation is headquartered in Brooks. The town is home to a large casino, Cache Creek Casino Resort. It lies at an elevation of 341 feet (104 m). As of the 2020 census, Brooks had a population of 31.

A post office was opened in Brooks in 1884. According to the Greater Capay Valley Historical Society, Brooks residents had to rely on passenger train service from the Vaca Valley and Clearlake Railroad at the train depots at the surrounding towns of Cadenasso and Tancred (towns that no longer exist). Brooks had no train station.

== Demographics ==
Historical population
Census	Pop.	Note	%±
2020	31		—
U.S. Decennial Census; 1850–1870 1880-1890; 1900 1910 1920; 1930 1940 1950; 1960 1970 1980; 1990 2000 2010

Brooks first appeared as a census designated place in the 2020 U.S. census.

=== 2020 census ===
As of the 2020 census, Brooks had a population of 31. The median age was 40.9 years. 19.4% of residents were under the age of 18 and 16.1% of residents were 65 years of age or older. For every 100 females there were 210.0 males, and for every 100 females age 18 and over there were 212.5 males age 18 and over.

0.0% of residents lived in urban areas, while 100.0% lived in rural areas.

There were 11 households in Brooks, of which 45.5% had children under the age of 18 living in them. Of all households, 54.5% were married-couple households, 0.0% were households with a male householder and no spouse or partner present, and 36.4% were households with a female householder and no spouse or partner present. About 9.1% of all households were made up of individuals and 0.0% had someone living alone who was 65 years of age or older.

There were 12 housing units, of which 8.3% were vacant. The homeowner vacancy rate was 0.0% and the rental vacancy rate was 0.0%.

Brooks CDP, California – Racial and ethnic composition Note: the US Census treats Hispanic/Latino as an ethnic category. This table excludes Latinos from the racial categories and assigns them to a separate category. Hispanics/Latinos may be of any race.
Race / Ethnicity (NH = Non-Hispanic)	Pop 2020	% 2020
White alone (NH)	13	41.94%
Black or African American alone (NH)	0	0.00%
Native American or Alaska Native alone (NH)	2	6.45%
Asian alone (NH)	0	0.00%
Pacific Islander alone (NH)	1	3.23%
Other race alone (NH)	0	0.00%
Mixed race or Multiracial (NH)	4	12.90%
Hispanic or Latino (any race)	11	35.48%
Total	31	100.00%

== Climate ==
This region experiences warm (but not hot) and dry summers, with no average monthly temperatures above 71.6 °F. According to the Köppen Climate Classification system, Brooks has a warm-summer Mediterranean climate, abbreviated "Csb" on climate maps.

Climate data for Brooks Farnham Ranch, California (1921–1985)
Month	Jan	Feb	Mar	Apr	May	Jun	Jul	Aug	Sep	Oct	Nov	Dec	Year
Mean daily maximum °F (°C)	55.5 (13.1)	60.9 (16.1)	65.8 (18.8)	72.5 (22.5)	82.5 (28.1)	90.7 (32.6)	98.6 (37.0)	96.5 (35.8)	90.9 (32.7)	79.5 (26.4)	66.1 (18.9)	56.9 (13.8)	76.4 (24.7)
Mean daily minimum °F (°C)	34.0 (1.1)	37.5 (3.1)	39.6 (4.2)	42.3 (5.7)	48.7 (9.3)	54.6 (12.6)	58.3 (14.6)	56.1 (13.4)	53.1 (11.7)	46.5 (8.1)	39.5 (4.2)	35.3 (1.8)	45.5 (7.5)
Average precipitation inches (mm)	3.96 (101)	3.49 (89)	2.43 (62)	1.35 (34)	0.40 (10)	0.18 (4.6)	0.02 (0.51)	0.05 (1.3)	0.19 (4.8)	1.08 (27)	2.47 (63)	3.88 (99)	19.49 (495)
Average snowfall inches (cm)	1.0 (2.5)	0 (0)	0 (0)	0 (0)	0 (0)	0 (0)	0 (0)	0 (0)	0 (0)	0 (0)	0 (0)	0.2 (0.51)	1.2 (3.0)
Average precipitation days (≥ 0.01 in)	9	8	8	5	2	1	0	0	1	3	6	8	51
Source: WRCC

== Education ==
Brooks is served by the Esparto Unified School District.
