= Video ad platform =

A video ad platform (VAP) helps publishers manage the advertising that appears in their online video, marketed as software as a service. Ad serving technologies are commonly used for managing web banner ads, but are especially designed to manage ads displayed in online video players, such as the widely used pre-roll and overlay format ads. VAP services can include but are not limited to:

- Ad serving
- Ad measurement
- Ad network management
- Yield optimization
- Inventory forecasting
- Ad format and frequency controls

Online video advertising platforms increased in popularity and revenue by 2011.

== See also ==
- Online advertising
- Pay per play
- Viral marketing
