= Cardroom =

Gambling establishment

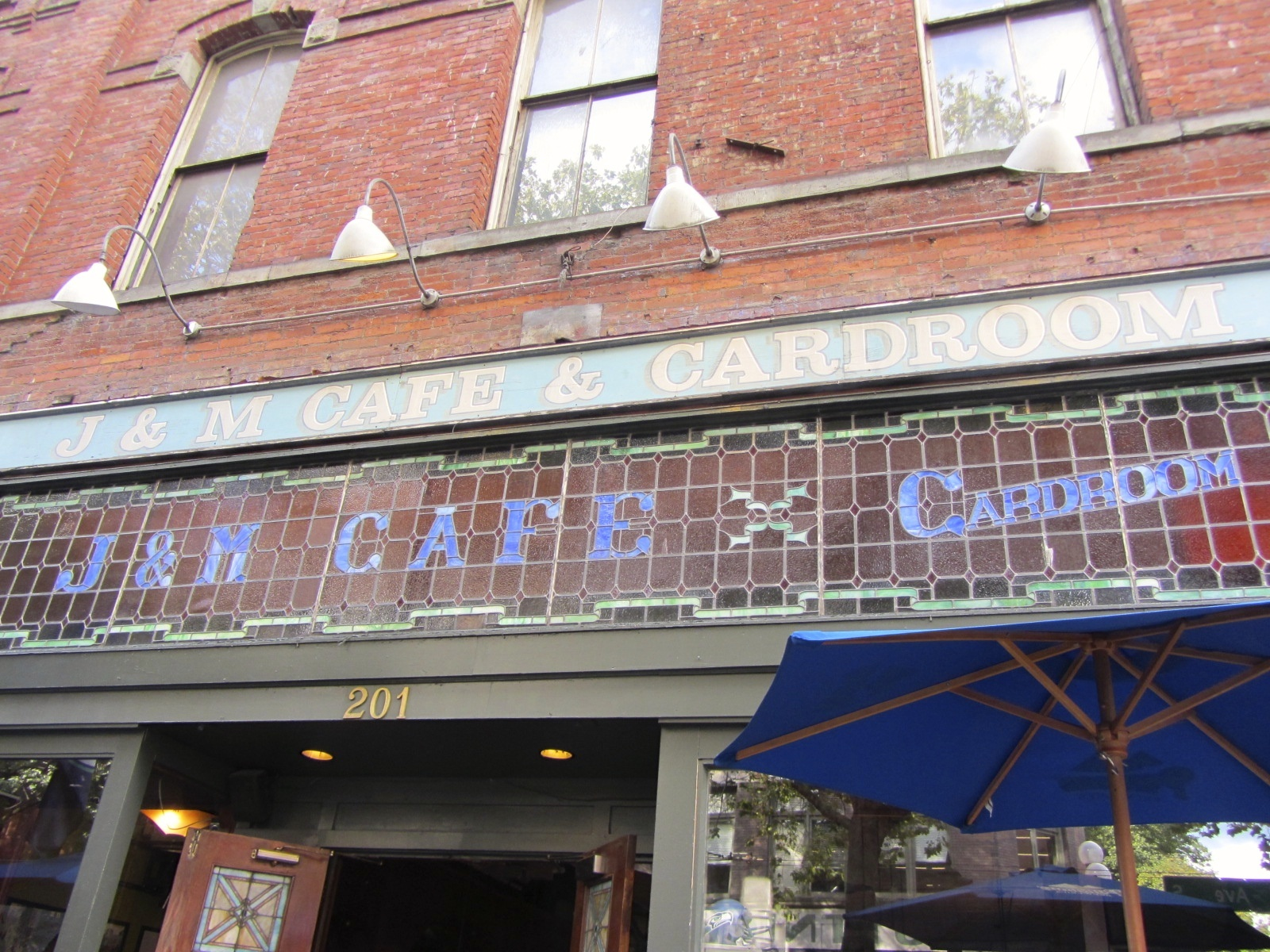
Sign for J&M Cafe & Cardroom, a cafe and card room in Seattle, 2013

A cardroom or card room is a gaming establishment that exclusively offers card games for play by the public. The term poker room is used to describe a room in casinos that is dedicated to playing poker and, in function, is similar to a card room.

Such rooms typically do not offer slot machines or video poker or other table games such as craps or roulette as found in casinos. However, a casino will often use the term "cardroom" or "poker room" (usually the latter) to refer to a separate room that offers card games where players typically compete against each other instead of against "the house".

== Overview ==
In the United States, stand-alone cardrooms are typically the result of local or state laws and regulations, which often prohibit full-fledged casino gambling. This was typically the case in California until the advent of casino gambling offered by Native American tribes in the 1990s, though card rooms continue to flourish and even expand there.

Since games played in card rooms are usually player-against-player instead of player-against-house, card room operators typically derive their revenues in one of two ways. In most situations, the dealer of each game (employed by the establishment) will collect a rake, a portion of the pot from each hand. At other times, a charge will be levied against each player for a specific time period, typically each half-hour.

Though traditional poker variants such as Texas hold 'em, Omaha hold 'em and seven-card stud are by far the most popular games offered by card rooms (and sometimes the only games), others may offer games such as panguingue, pai gow, Chinese poker, and variations on blackjack. These so-called "California games", or "Asian games", may resemble such traditional casino games as blackjack, baccarat, and even craps but have rules that comply with various state restrictions.

Most U.S. stand-alone card rooms are located in Montana, with more than two hundred such clubs licensed in 2013, and over four hundred licensed nationally. California has the second most such clubs, with 88 such clubs as of 2013. California card rooms like the California Grand Casino date back to the 1850s. Some are modest establishments with just a few tables, while others are the largest poker rooms in the world, offering as much as five times as many tables as the largest Las Vegas cardroom. Some even call themselves "casinos", even though their lack of electronic and table games would normally disqualify the use of such a term by modern standards. Hollywood Park Casino, a casino located near and formerly part of Hollywood Park Racetrack, a former Thoroughbred race track in Inglewood, California, has an elaborate card room on its premises. Other large cardrooms are Bay 101 and Casino M8trix in San Jose, the Commerce Casino in Commerce and the Bicycle Casino in Bell Gardens. All these clubs host major poker tournaments, which attract the game's top players and television coverage.

Poker rooms are sometimes operated illegally. New York City has been home to underground card rooms, some of which were the basis of the movie Rounders. Two rooms with more than ten tables, the 14th Street PlayStation and the 72nd Street Players Club, were closed down by the police in 2005, but other smaller clubs continue to exist.

Websites offering online poker games are referred to as "online cardrooms" rather than casinos.

== See also ==
- List of casinos
