= Miwok (disambiguation) =

The Miwok are four Native American groups in Northern California.

Miwok may also refer to:

== Miwok peoples ==
=== Branches ===
- Bay Miwok
- Coast Miwok
- Lake Miwok
- Plains and Sierra Miwok

=== Federally recognized tribes ===
- Buena Vista Rancheria of Me-Wuk Indians
- California Valley Miwok Tribe
- Chicken Ranch Rancheria of Me-Wuk Indians
- Federated Indians of Graton Rancheria
- Ione Band of Miwok Indians
- Middletown Rancheria
- Shingle Springs Band of Miwok Indians
- Tuolumne Band of Me-Wuk Indians of the Tuolumne Rancheria
- United Auburn Indian Community of Auburn Rancheria
- Wilton Rancheria Indian Tribe

=== Languages ===
- Miwok languages
  - Bay Miwok language
  - Coast Miwok language
  - Lake Miwok language
  - Sierra Miwok language
    - Northern Sierra Miwok
    - Central Sierra Miwok
    - Southern Sierra Miwok

== Other uses ==
- Miwok 100km Trail Race, an ultrarunning race
- Miwok Lodge (now the Silicon Valley Monterey Bay Council), a Boy Scouts lodge
- Mi-Wuk Village, a housing development (not a tribal village)
