= California Valley Miwok Tribe =

Indian tribe in California, United States

Total population
- 43 people reported as being part of the California Valley Miwok Tribe (some in combination with other ethnicities) in the 2010 census 5 enrolled citizens were recognized by the federal government as of August 2011

Regions with significant populations
- United States (California)

Languages
- English, historically Northern Sierra Miwok language, Central Sierra Miwok language, and Southern Sierra Miwok language

Related ethnic groups
- other Miwok tribes

The California Valley Miwok Tribe is a federally recognized tribe of Miwok people in San Joaquin County and Calaveras County, California. They were previously known as the Sheep Ranch Rancheria or the Sheep Ranch Rancheria of Me-Wuk Indian of California. The California Valley Miwok are Sierra Miwok, an Indigenous people of California.

== Government ==
The tribe conducts business from Stockton, California. The current tribal administration is:

- Silvia Burley, Chairperson
- Anjelica Paulk, Vice-Chairperson
- Rashel Reznor, Secretary/Treasurer

According to the tribe's website, it is currently governed by a tribal/general council that meets monthly. Officers are elected for six-year terms, with the tribe electing a vice chairperson in 2015 and both a chairperson and a secretary/treasurer in 2017.

== History ==
Membership of the tribe was very low throughout the 20th century. In 1916, the federal government purchased 0.92 acres (0.37 ha) at Sheep Ranch, California for the benefit of 12 named members of the tribe. They were described by the Indian agent who arranged the purchase as "the remnant of once quite a large band of Indians in former years living in or near the old decaying mining town known and designated on the map as 'Sheepranch' ". In 1935, the only Indian recorded as living on the ranchería was Jeff Davis. Davis was recorded as voting in favor of the Indian Reorganization Act on June 8, 1912.

By 1966, Mabel Hodge Dixie was identified as the only adult member of the tribe living on the ranchería. The Bureau of Indian Affairs developed a plan to distribute the tribe's assets to her that year under the 1958 California Rancheria Act, but never declared the tribe terminated or treated it as such. In 1994, Mabel's son Yakima Dixie identified himself as "the only descendant and ... recognized member of the Tribe."

== Legal and membership disputes since 1999 ==
From the late-1990s there was a long-running dispute over the government, membership and status of the California Valley Miwok Tribe. On August 5, 1998, Yakima Dixie accepted Silvia Burley as a member of the tribe, along with her two daughters and granddaughter. Burley provided information tracing her ancestry to Jeff Davis, who had been listed as the only member of the tribe in a 1913 census; she had contacted Dixie at the suggestion of the Bureau of Indian Affairs (BIA). At the time of Burley's admission in 1998, the tribe was not "organized" as defined by the Indian Reorganization Act, and the BIA recommended that, given its small size, the tribe should form a general council, a simpler structure than formal organization.

A general council of all adult citizens was formed on November 5, 1998, and by late 1999 a dispute had arisen between Burley and Dixie. Between 1999 and 2010, each party appealed to the BIA to support its view and to intervene on the grounds that the other had not involved the "whole tribal community" of both enrolled citizens and potentially enrolled citizens. For much of this period, the BIA took the view that it had a duty to intervene in the tribe's affairs on behalf of potentially enrolled citizens of the tribe. In this respect, the BIA became the adjudicator between the claims of the competing parties, determining which decisions were valid and which members constituted the tribe's government. In a December 22, 2010 decision, the BIA completely reversed its opinion, deciding that it had no obligation to represent the interests of potentially enrolled tribe members, and that therefore the BIA was free to wash its hands of involvement. the BIA advised the parties that, "continuing this imprudent dispute risks potential adverse consequences well beyond the Tribe and its descendants". The BIA noted that "it is equitably appropriate for the CVMT to reach out to potential citizens..." but that it is not a duty of the federal government to impose this requirement on the tribe. This decision was reaffirmed by Larry Echo Hawk, assistant secretary of Indian Affairs, in a detailed letter to the parties on August 31, 2011.

The California Gambling Control Commission made distributions to the tribe worth $1.1 million per year from the Indian Gaming Revenue Sharing Trust Fund from July 2000 through August 2005. Following the BIA's intervention in the tribe's affairs, the CGCC decided to cease distributions to the California Valley Miwok Tribe and instead to hold them in trust. In a 2007 letter, the commission told the tribe it would release the funds after the BIA recognized the governing body and the tribe resolved its leadership dispute. However, the funds were not released following the 2011 BIA decision to recognize Burley as the tribe's chair, prompting Burley to sue the commission in state and federal courts. A non-member of the tribe, Chadd Everone, who describes himself as a "deputy and consul general" for Yakima Dixie, has countersued to prevent distribution of the funds to Burley's group, contending that Dixie never resigned as chair of the tribe. Court filings by Burley's group claim that Everone is manipulating Dixie and wants to use the gaming distributions "as security" to attract outside investors for a project to build a tribal casino. They allege that Everone intends to bring the tribe under his own control with Dixie as a "puppet" chair of the tribe.

== See also ==
- Miwok people
- Sierra Miwok

== Sources ==
- "2010 Census CPH-T-6. American Indian and Alaska Native Tribes in the United States and Puerto Rico: 2010" (PDF). census.gov. 2010.
- "American Indian Environmental Office Tribal Portal: Tribes A-Z". US Environmental Protection Agency.
- "California Indians and Their Reservations: California Valley Miwok Tribe". San Diego State University Library and Information Access. 2011. Archived from the original on January 4, 2016.
- "Government: Tribal Leadership". California Valley Miwok Tribe. Archived from the original on October 14, 2012.
- Berry, Carol (January 24, 2011). "Miwok Tribe Settles Lengthy Sovereignty Dispute". Indian Country Today.
- Echo Hawk, Larry (August 31, 2011). "Reaffirmation of decision by BIA not to organize government of California Valley Miwok Tribe" (PDF). Letter to Silvia Burley and Yakima Dixie.
- Haas, Theodore H. (1947). Ten Years of Tribal Government under I.R.A. (PDF). Tribal Relations Pamphlets. United States Indian Service.
- Pritzker, Barry M. (2000). "Miwok". A Native American Encyclopedia: History, Culture, and Peoples. Oxford: Oxford University Press. ISBN 978-0-19-513877-1.
- Simson, Caroline (May 1, 2015). "Tribe's Suit Over Control Fight Lacks Evidence, Court Told". Law360.
