= Plains Miwok language =

Extinct Miwok language

Plains Miwok
- Native to: United States
- Region: California
- Ethnicity: Plains and Sierra Miwok
- Extinct: late 1990s
- Language family: Yok-Utian: Utian; Miwokan; Eastern; Plains Miwok

Language codes
- ISO 639-3: pmw
- Glottolog: plai1259
- ELP: Plains Miwok

Miwkoʔ hənnaj (Plains Miwok language, also known as Valley Miwok), is one of the Miwok languages spoken in central California by the Plains Miwok people. It is spoken in the deltas of the San Joaquin and Cosumnes Rivers. Plains Miwok was once one of the most populous Miwok languages prior to colonization. While English is commonly spoken, Miwkoʔ hənnaj is still used by a few community members. Several place names in the region including Cosumnes and Mokelumne originate from Miwkoʔ hənnaj.

== Phonology ==
Consonants
		Bilabial	Alveolar	Post- alveolar	Palatal	Velar	Glottal
Plosive	plain	p	t	tʃ ⟨c⟩		k	ʔ ⟨'⟩
Plosive	voiced	b (Note: Phonemes taken from Spanish loan words.)	d			ɡ	
Nasal		m	n			ŋ	
Fricative			s				h
Tap			ɾ ⟨r⟩				
Approximant		w	l		j ⟨j⟩		

Allophones of /b tʃ ɡ n s/ include [β ts ɣ ŋ ʂ].

Vowels
	Front	Central	Back
Close	i	ɨ ⟨y⟩	u
Mid	e	ə	o
Open		a	
