= Miwok languages =

Utian language family of California

Miwok
- Miwokan
- Geographic distribution: California, western slopes of Sierra Nevada
- Ethnicity: Miwok
- Linguistic classification: Penutian ?: Yok-Utian ?; Utian; Miwok
- Subdivisions: Eastern; Western †

Language codes
- Glottolog: miwo1275

The Miwok or Miwokan languages (/ˈmiːwɒk/; Northern Sierra Miwok: [míwːɨːk]), also known as Moquelumnan or Miwuk, are a group of endangered languages spoken in central California by the Miwok peoples, ranging from the San Francisco Bay Area to the Sierra Nevada. There are seven Miwok languages, four of which have distinct regional dialects. There are a few dozen speakers of the three Sierra Miwok languages, and in 1994 there were two speakers of Lake Miwok. The best attested language is Southern Sierra Miwok, from which the name Yosemite originates. The name Miwok comes from the Northern Sierra Miwok word miw·yk meaning 'people.'

== Languages ==
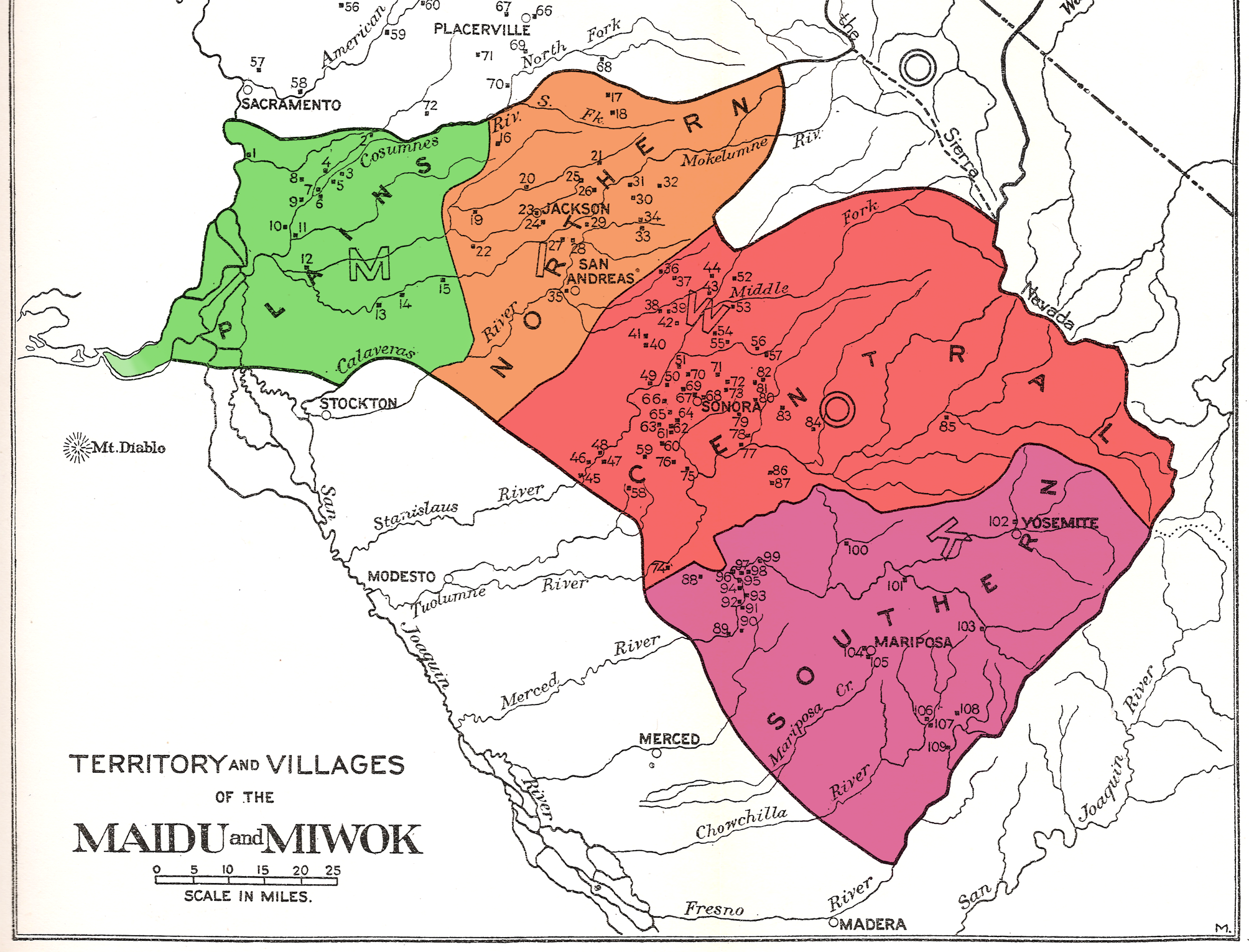
1925 map of the Plains and Sierra Miwok territories

Language family by Mithun (1999):

- Eastern Miwok
  - †Plains Miwok
  - †Bay Miwok (a.k.a. Saclan)
  - Sierra Miwok
    - †Northern Sierra Miwok (Camanche, Fiddletown, Ione, and West Point dialects)
    - Central Sierra Miwok (nearly extinct) (East Central and West Central dialects)
    - Southern Sierra Miwok (nearly extinct) (Yosemite, Mariposa, and Southern dialects)
- Western Miwok
  - †Coast Miwok (Bodega and Marin dialects)
  - †Lake Miwok

== Proto-language ==
Reconstructions of Proto-Miwok plant and animal names by Callaghan (2014):

Proto-Miwok animal names
Gloss	Proto-Miwok
coyote	*ʔole
wolf	*hu·n, *hun·u-
antelope, bighorn	*ha·lu-ṣ
pocket gopher	*syw·yt
dog	*haju
chicken hawk	*suj·u
duck hawk	*wek-wek
fish hawk	*tuk-tuk
California condor	*mol·uk ?
great horned owl	*tuk·u-·li
barn owl	*wič·iki-ṣ
burrowing owl	*ṭok(·)ok...
valley quail	*hek...
roadrunner	*ʔuj(·)uj u, *ʔu·juju ?
kingfisher	*ča·ṭa·-ṭa-
pileated woodpecker	*pak-pak
California woodpecker	*palaṭ·ak
lesser snow goose	*wa·wo ?
goose spp.	*low·ot ?
lizard	*pit·e-·li ?
frog, sound of frog	*waṭa·k ?
grasshopper	*ko·ṭo ?
head louse	*ke·t, *ket·y-
flea	*ky(·)ky-ṣ
spider	*pok·um
body louse	*čypsi
scorpion	*ʔet·ym

Proto-Miwok plant names
Gloss	Proto-Miwok
mountain pine and nuts	*san(·)ak
pine nuts, nuts	*ṣanak
gray pine and nuts	*sa·k, *sak·y
cedar, cypress	*mo·nuk ?
valley oak, tree	*ʔalwaṣ, ʔala·waṣ
live oak	*sa·ṭa
small oak tree	*su·k ?
white oak	*mol·a, *mo·la
maple	*ṣa·ji
buckeye (tree and fruit)	*ʔu·nu
tree alder	*sot·um ?
elderberry tree/fruit	*ʔantaj
manzanita (tree and berries)	*ʔe·je, *ʔej·e
Sierra gooseberry	*ki·li
poison oak	Proto-Utian *nykys
brush	*lim·e
wormwood (sage herb)	*kičin
grapes	*mut(·)e
black basket root	*mul·a
root, basket root (Carex spp.)	*su·li
Indian potato (Brodiaea spp.)	*wa·la
tea plant	*huk...
jimson weed	?
