= Mission San José (California) =

18th-century Spanish mission in California

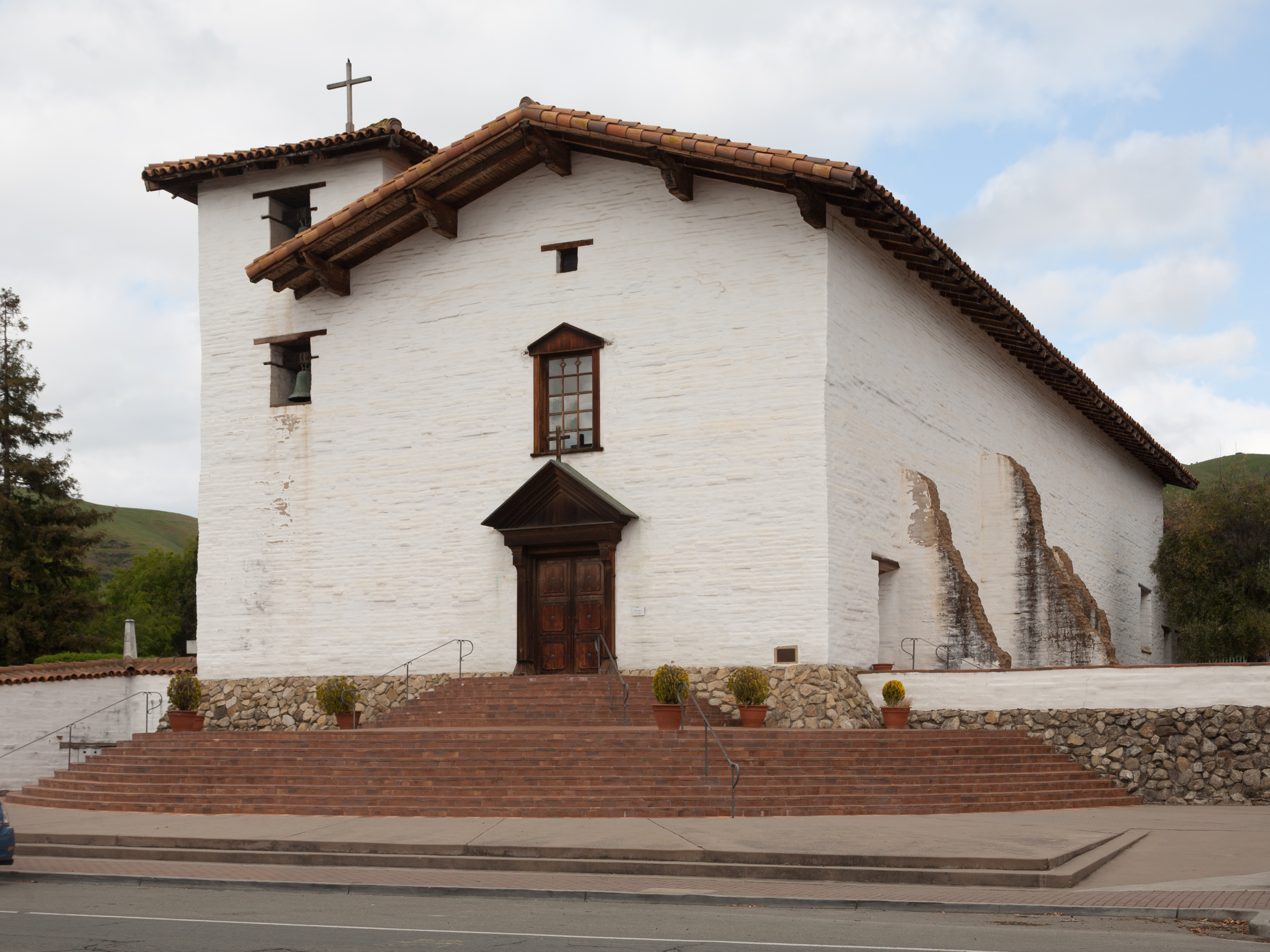
- The mission in 2011

- Location within California Location within the United States
- Location: 43300 Mission Blvd. Fremont, California 94539
- Coordinates: 37°32′01″N 121°55′11″W
- Name as founded: La Misión del Gloriosísimo Patriarca Señor San José
- English translation: The Mission of the Glorious Patriarch Lord Saint Joseph
- Patron: Saint Joseph
- Founded: June 11, 1797
- Founded by: Father Fermín Lasuén
- Founding Order: Fourteenth
- Headquarters of the Alta California Mission System: 1824–1827; 1830–1833
- Military district: Fourth
- Native tribe: Bay Miwok; Coast Miwok; Lake Miwok; Patwin; Tamyen; Yokuts; Costeño
- Native place name: Oroysom
- Baptisms: 6,673
- Marriages: 1,990
- Burials: 4,800
- Secularized: 1834
- Returned to the Church: 1858
- Governing body: Roman Catholic Diocese of Oakland
- Current use: Chapel / Museum

U.S. National Register of Historic Places
- Designated: 1971
- Reference no.: 71000131

California Historical Landmark
- Reference no.: 1. 334

Website
- http://www.missionsanjose.org/

Mission San José is a Spanish mission located in the present-day city of Fremont, California, United States. It was founded on June 11, 1797, by the Franciscan order and was the fourteenth Spanish mission established in California. The Mission entered a long period of gradual decline after Mexican secularization act of 1833. After suffering decline, neglect and earthquakes most of the mission was in ruins. Restoration efforts in the intervening periods have reconstructed many of the original structures. The old mission church remains in use as a chapel of Saint Joseph Catholic Church, a parish of the Diocese of Oakland. The museum also features a visitor center, museum, and slide show telling the history of the mission.

== History ==
The original site considered by Juan Crespí in 1772 for what was to become Mission San José was in what is today known as the San Ramon Valley. However, the Native Americans living in that area were very hostile towards the Spanish, so it was decided to locate the Mission farther south, in an area that is now part of Fremont, California.

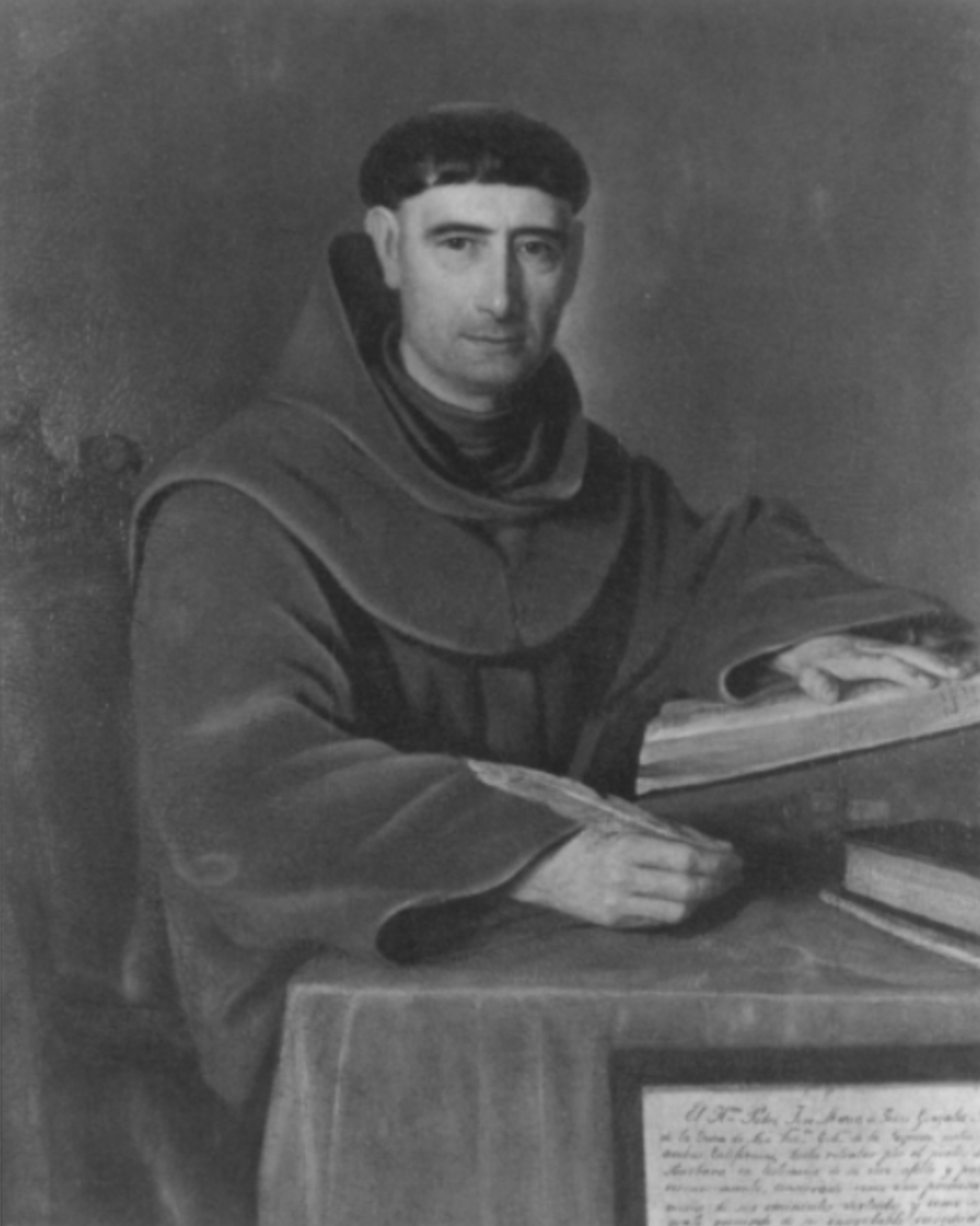
Padre José González Rubio served briefly as administrator of the mission.

Work on the site of Mission San Jose commenced in May 1797, many years after Crespí's death, by Native American people from Mission Santa Clara, 13 miles (21 km) to the south, under the direction of Franciscan missionaries and secular Hispanic overseers. The location, on slopes overlooking the Fremont plain on the east side of San Francisco Bay, had been inhabited for countless generations by Indians who spoke the San Francisco Bay Ohlone language. The Ohlone lived a hunting and wild-plant harvesting lifestyle. Their food included seeds, roots, berries, the flour from acorns, small game, deer, fish, and shellfish. In 1797 most of the Indians, from the immediate vicinity of the mission site had already been baptized at Mission Santa Clara during the 1780s and early 1790s. It was these people who returned home to form the founding population of the new community. Mission San José's walls were 5 feet (1.5 m) thick. The church is 126 feet (38 m) long, 30 feet (9.1 m) wide, 24 feet (7.3 m) high; made of adobe and redwood, the floor and the wall are made of tiles.

By the end of 1800, the neophyte population had risen to 277, including both Ohlone and Bay Miwok speakers. By the end of 1805, all Indians of the East Bay south of Carquinez Strait were at the missions. After a devastating measles epidemic that reduced the mission population by one quarter in 1806, people from more distant areas and new language groups began to join the Mission San Jose community. The first such language group was the Yokuts or Yokutsan, whose speakers began to move to Mission San José from the San Joaquin Valley in 1810. Members of two more language groups, the Coast Miwok from present Sonoma County and Patwin from present Napa and Solano counties, moved down to Mission San Jose in the 1812–1818 period, but in smaller numbers than the Yokuts. By 1825 Delta Yokuts was the dominant language in the multilingual community of 1,796 people. Over the next few years speakers of yet another language group, Plains Miwok, moved to the mission from the north side of the Sacramento-San Joaquin River Delta. By the time Mission San Jose was closed as an agricultural commune in the mid-1830s, Plains Miwok was the predominant native language among its neophyte Indian people. Father Narciso Durán became the pastor of the mission in 1806 and remained until he was replaced by Father José González Rubio in February 1833 as part of a post-independence policy requiring the replacement of Spanish-born clerics with those born in Mexico. Durán trained the neophytes in music, organizing both a choir and a 30-piece orchestra that became famous throughout California. While at San José, Father Durán twice served as Father-Presidente of the Franciscan missions.

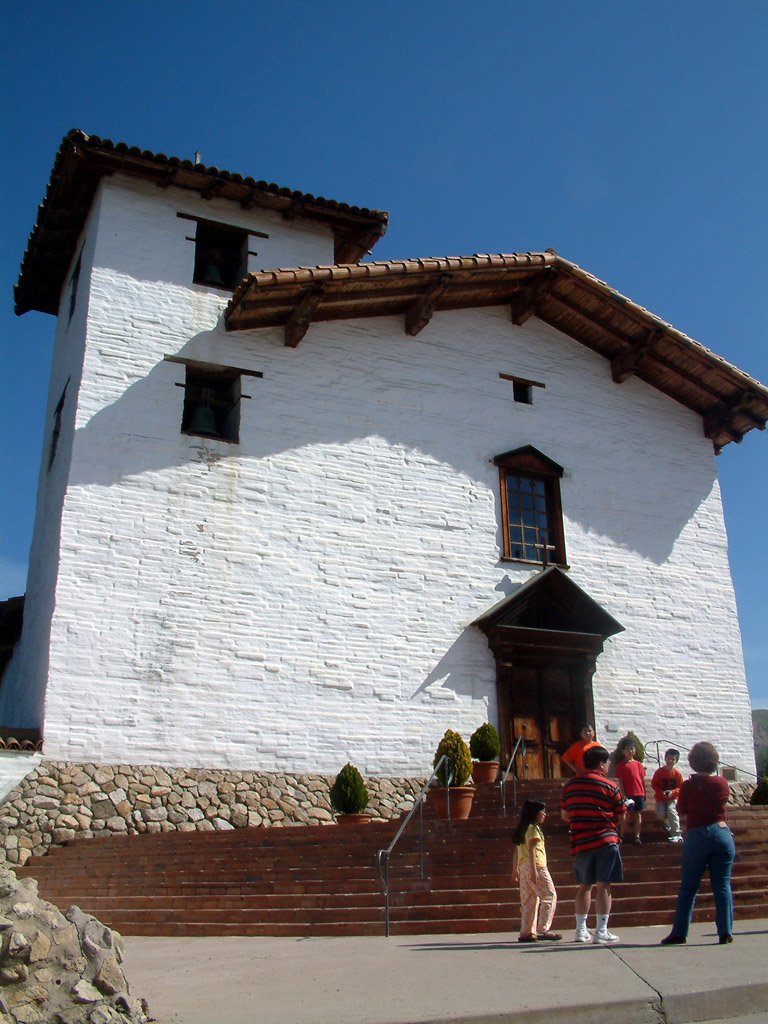
The main façade of the mission Capilla (chapel) in 2004

The Mission's first permanent Adobe church was dedicated with great ceremony on April 22, 1809. Valuable gifts of vestments, sacred vessels, religious statues, and paintings attest to the generosity of friends of the Mission in the Bay Area and abroad. The majority of vestments in the modern collection date from the late 18th and early 19th centuries. The silken fabrics and embroideries were products of various textile centers of the Spanish Empire, whose suppliers extended from Europe to Asia. Mission San José was the center of industry and agriculture. The site was chosen for the abundance of natural resources of the area including water, fertile ground, stones, and adobe soil suitable for building. Thousands of cattle roamed the Mission ranges, and acres of wheat and other crops were planted and harvested under the direction of the Padres. In 1868, it produced 4,070 bushels (110 metric tons) of wheat and much produce, including grapes, olives, and figs.

In 1832, the Mission's 12,000 cattle, 13,000 horses, and 12,000 sheep roamed Mission lands from present-day Oakland to San Jose. San José was one of the most prosperous of all of the California missions. An 1833 inventory prepared by Father José González Rubio lists a church, monastery, guardhouse, guest house, and a women's dormitory, in addition to the thousands of acres of crops and grazing land. This prosperity was not to last long, however. On August 17 of that year, the Mexican Congress passed An Act for the Secularization of the Missions of California.

=== Rancho period (1836–1853) ===
During the transition to full secularization, Father José González Rubio remained at the Mission as chief administrator for the church, while José de Jesús Vallejo (brother of General Mariano G. Vallejo) was appointed a civil administrator. The Mission lands were gradually parceled out to private landowners. In 1842, Father González Rubio was transferred to Mission Santa Barbara. The native people fled but found themselves unable to readjust to their former way of life; many subsequently died of disease and starvation. The Mission buildings, granaries, orchards, and gardens were allowed to decay, and the great herds scattered. Mexican Governor Pío Pico sold the Mission property to private interests in 1845 for $12,000. During the 1848 California Gold Rush, H. C. Smith converted the Mission to a general store, saloon, and hotel. The town of Mission San José became a thriving provision center at the gateway to the Southern Mines. The names of many pioneer families prominent in early California history, including Livermore, Peralta, and Alviso, were closely linked to the Mission.

=== California statehood (1850–1890) ===
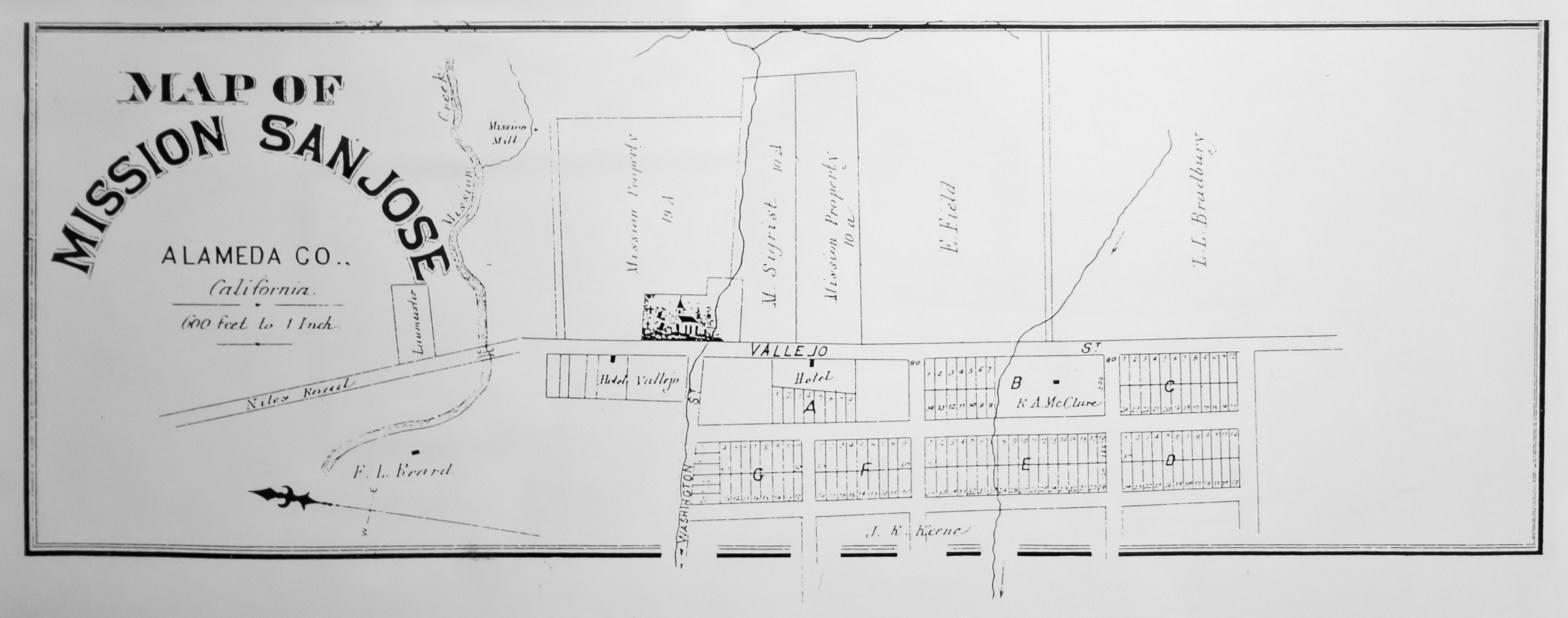
Historical map of the mission and surroundings

The Rancho period ended with the succession of California to the United States in the Treaty of Guadalupe-Hidalgo, and the establishment of California as a state in 1850. Some of the original exterior adobe buttresses were removed on orders of the parish priest. On March 18, 1865, President Abraham Lincoln restored the California missions to the Catholic Church.

On October 21, 1868, a magnitude 6.3–6.7 earthquake on the Hayward Fault which runs through the grounds of the Mission shattered the walls of the Mission church and broke open the roof. Other Mission buildings, including the Tienda, the Priest's Quarters, and the Mission itself were also damaged by the earthquake.

The site was cleared and a wood-framed, Gothic-style church was erected directly over the original red-tiled Mission floor. In 1890, a Victorian-style rectory was built over the site of a portion of the adobe wing which housed the Padres and served as the administration building during the Mission Era.

=== 20th century and beyond (1900–present) ===
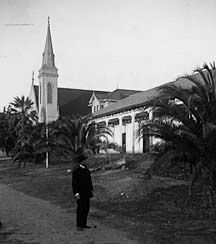
Mission San José c. 1910

The original mission complex consisted of over 100 adobe buildings. Restoration efforts by the Native Sons of the Golden West in 1915 and 1950 saved the surviving portion of the Mission wing and converted it into a museum, set in the gracious surroundings of flowers and palm trees. In 1956, the town of Mission San José incorporated with four others to become the City of Fremont. Plans to reconstruct the church of Mission San José were launched in 1973. The Victorian-style rectory was relocated to nearby Anza Street and the Gothic-style wooden church was moved to San Mateo where it has been restored as a house of worship by an Anglican church group. After extensive archaeological excavations and planning, construction began in 1982 on a replica of the 1809 adobe church. Work was completed and the facility rededicated on June 11, 1985. The walls vary in thickness from 4 to 5 feet (1.5 m). Old timbers and rawhide thongs demonstrate the practicality of the Padres who, having no iron nails for building, substituted the leather laces. Consequently, the lumber used in the reconstruction has been given a hand-hewn appearance.

With its "simple and forthright" exterior, the Mission church stands as a tribute to those whose efforts made this dream come true. The richly decorated interior follows the descriptions in the historic inventories of the 1830s. The crystal chandeliers are copies of period pieces similar to ones listed in the old church inventories. Two of the original statues have been placed on the two side altars. Ecce Homo, a figure of Christ clothed in a scarlet robe and crowned with thorns, stands on a balcony above one of the side altars. The other statue of Saint Bonaventure was carved from wood and then painted. The original baptismal font of hammered copper on a turned wood base has been returned to the church, as has the bell wheel used by the Ohlones during the sacred parts of the Mass.

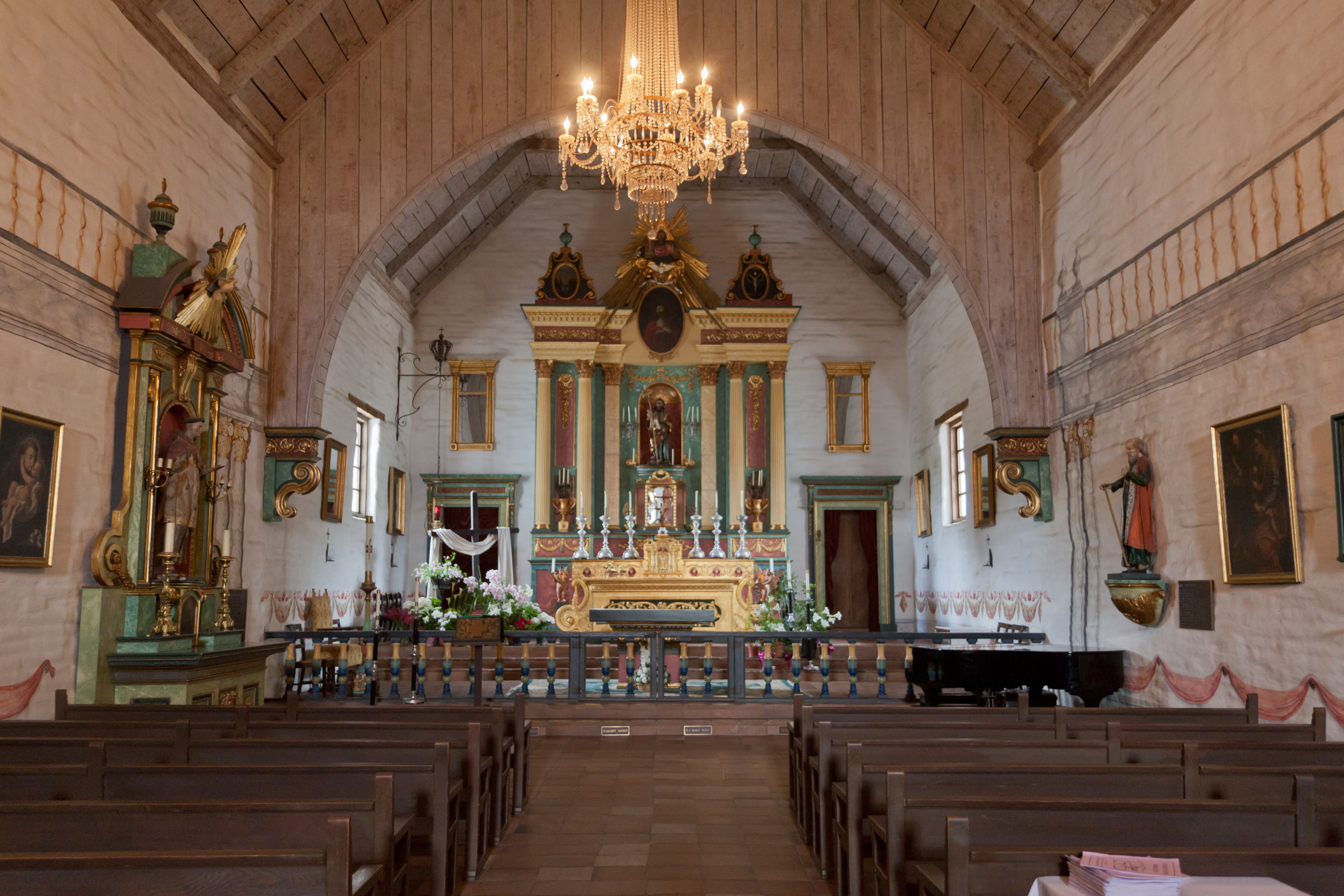
The chapel interior

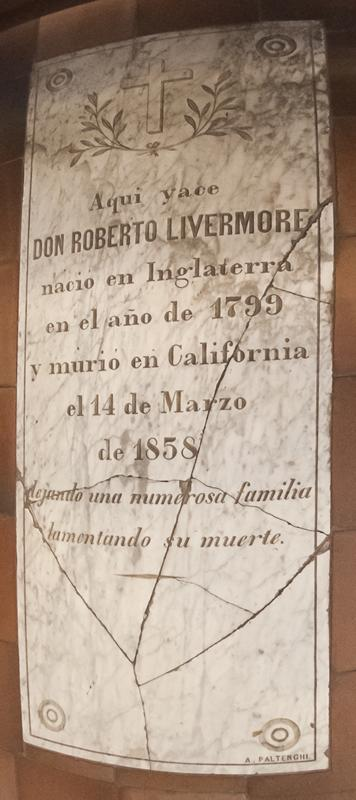
Robert Livermore's grave marker restored in the mission floor, with his date of death given as 14 March 1858

The reredos behind the main altar features a painting of Christ, a statue of Saint Joseph, and two carved figures: a dove represents the Holy Spirit, and at the top sits God the Father with detailed golden rays surrounding him. The altar and choir railings were copied from an original piece found in the museum during the reconstruction. The Mission cemetery (camp Santo), where a great number of Mission pioneers are buried, is situated to the side of the church. During the dig, the marble grave marker of Robert Livermore was located in the original tile floor of the church. It was carefully repaired and replaced in the reconstructed church. Many prominent Spaniards are buried in the floor of the Mission church, but only Livermore's grave is marked. Thousands of Ohlones are resting in the Ohlone cemetery located almost a mile away from the mission down Washington Boulevard. Three of the original Mission bells were transferred from the destroyed adobe church to the wooden church of 1869, where they hung until the 1970s. The fourth bell had been given to a church in Oakland and recast, but was returned to the Mission during the reconstruction of the bell tower. Now all four bells are hung, ready to ring on special occasions.

In 1985, the restoration of the church was completed by the Committee for the Restoration of the Mission San Jose and the Catholic Diocese of Oakland. It is considered to be a near-perfect replica of the original church, though it incorporates a concealed structural steel frame which provides earthquake resistance. Further reconstruction of the missing part of the Padres' living quarters and a restoration of the surviving adobe wing are part of the overall plans for the Mission. Today, the Mission is administered by St. Joseph's parish, which includes the Mission building and the surrounding areas, an ordinary church building used to fulfill the daily needs of the parish, and a school serving students in grades 1–8.

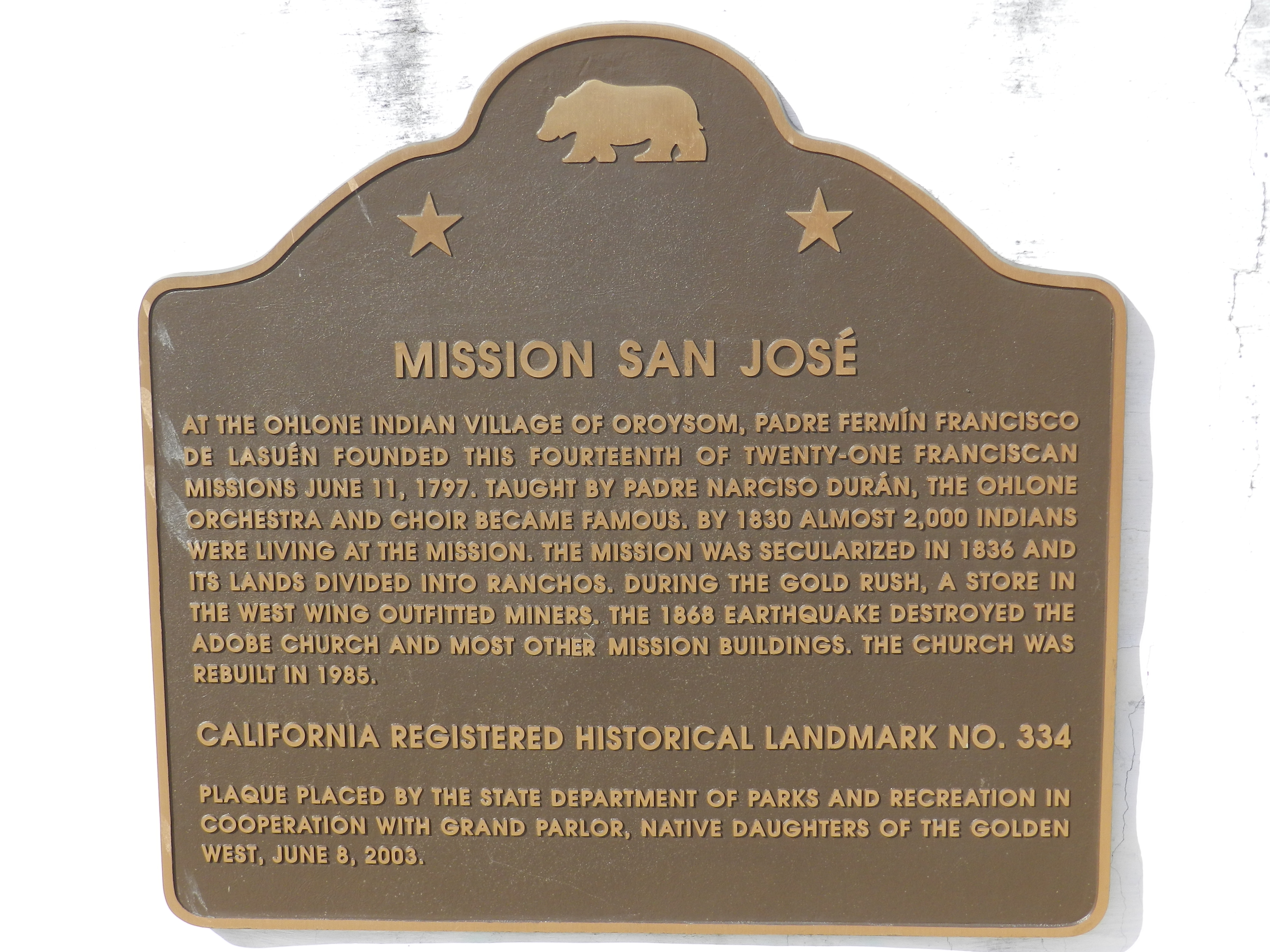
California historical marker

== See also ==
- Spanish missions in California
- List of Spanish missions in California
- Mission Boulevard
- Mission Peak
- USNS Mission San Jose (AO-125) – a Mission Buenaventura-class fleet oiler built during World War II

== Notes ==
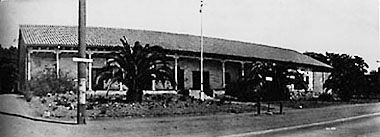
Mission San José c. 1910
