= MKQ =

MKQ or mkq may refer to:

- MKQ, the IATA code for Mopah International Airport, Merauke, Papua, Indonesia
- mkq, the ISO 639-3 code for Bay Miwok language, California, United States
