= Southern Sierra Miwok =

Utian language of North America

- Yosemite
- Native to: United States
- Region: California, western slopes of Sierra Nevada
- Ethnicity: Valley and Sierra Miwok
- Native speakers: 3 (2019)
- Language family: Yok-Utian: Utian; Miwokan; Eastern; Sierra Miwok; Southern Sierra Miwok

Language codes
- ISO 639-3: skd
- Glottolog: sout2985
- ELP: Sierra Miwok (shared)
- Southern Sierra Miwok is classified as Critically Endangered by the UNESCO Atlas of the World's Languages in Danger.

Southern Sierra Miwok (also known as Meewoc, Mewoc, Me-Wuk, Miwoc, Miwokan, Mokélumne, Moquelumnan, San Raphael, Talatui, Talutui, and Yosemite) is a Utian language spoken by the Native American people called the Southern Sierra Miwok of Northern California. Southern Sierra Miwok is a member of the Miwok language family. The Miwok languages are a part of the larger Utian family. The original territory of the Southern Sierra Miwok people is similar to modern day Mariposa County, California. The Southern Sierra Miwok language is nearly extinct with only a few speakers existing today. A language revitalization effort is in progress in the Southern Sierra Miwok Nation.

The name Miwok comes from the Sierra Miwok word miwwik meaning "people" or "Indians". It was originally used in 1877 for the Plains and Sierra Miwok people, but was later reassigned to its current usage in 1908 to describe the set of Utian languages distinct from the western Coastanoan (Ohlone) languages.

== Phonology ==
=== Consonants ===
Below are the 15 consonants of the Southern Sierra Miwok written in IPA (the common orthography is noted within ⟨ ⟩ ):

	Bilabial	Dental	Alveolar	Post- alveolar	Velar	Glottal
Nasal	m		n		ŋ	
Plosive	p	t̪ ⟨t⟩	t ⟨ṭ⟩		k	ʔ
Affricate				t͡ʃ ⟨c,tš⟩		
Fricative			s	ʃ ⟨š⟩		h
Lateral			l			
Semivowel			j		w	

There is considerable variation within the phonemes listed in the chart above. For example, the following allophones are in free variation with each other intervocalically and proceeding voiced consonants:

/p/ ([p] ~ [b] ~ [β])
/t/ ([t̪] ~ [d̪] ~ [ɾ])
/t͡ʃ/ ([t͡ʃ] ~ [d͡ʒ])
/k/ ([k] ~ [ɡ] ~ [ɣ])

Also, [s] is in free variation with [z] only in intervocalic environments. /k/ is slightly postvelar when it occurs before /a/ or /o/, and in these situations it is often written ⟨ḳ⟩. When positioned intervocalically or after voiced consonants there is free variation between the velar and slightly postvelar variants of the following sounds: ([k̺] ~ [ɣ] ~ [g]). Lastly, the following phonemes only occur in English loan words: /b, d, ɡ, f, d͡ʒ, r/.

=== Vowels ===
Below are the long and short variants of the 6 vowels of the Southern Sierra Miwok language written in IPA (the common orthography is noted within ⟨ ⟩):

	Front		Central		Back	
	short	long	short	long	short	long
High	ɪ ⟨i⟩	iː	ɨ ⟨y⟩	ɨː ⟨yː⟩	u	uː
Mid	ɛ ⟨e⟩	eː				ɔː ⟨oː⟩
Low			a		ɒ ⟨o⟩	ɑː ⟨aː⟩

/i, u, e, o/ are highest when long, as shown in the chart above. However, /o/ is also high before /w/ and /j/. /i/ is at its lowest before /k/ and /ʔ/ while /u/ is lowest only before /ʔ/. /e/ is slightly lower before /j/, but, along with /o/ and /ɨ/, is lowest before /ʔ/, /k/ and /h/, with /ɨ/ pronounced at approximately [ə]. Also, /ɨ/ is slightly backed before /w/. /a/ acts the most differently compared to the other vowels as it is backed to [ɑ] when long and is slightly fronted before /w/ and /j/ and both fronted and raised before /ʔ/ and /k/.

=== Length ===
Since vowel and consonant length is contrastive, length (represented as /ː/) is considered to be a separate (archi-)phoneme.

=== Syllable structure ===
There are two types of syllables in Southern Sierra Miwok: light, CV, and heavy, CV: or CVC. In each word, one of the first two syllables is always heavy, so therefore every Southern Sierra Miwok word contains at least one heavy syllable. Because of this preference towards heavy syllables, consonant clusters are usually separated to form codas of preceding syllables.

=== Stress ===
Southern Sierra Miwok uses the following three stress levels:

- Primary Stress- This falls on the first heavy syllable in any word. Furthermore, the coda of this syllable is usually pronounced for a greater length of time than is normal in other syllables.
- Secondary Stress- This stress falls on any heavy syllables succeeding the primary stressed syllable. In the event of a long sequence of heavy syllables, the trochee stress system is adopted.
- Weak Stress- This falls on all light syllables.

== Morphology ==
Every Southern Sierra Miwok word consists of a root and (usually) one to two suffixes. Below are definitions of common terms used to describe the basic structure of a Southern Sierra Miwok word:

- Stem = (root) + (1 optional suffix)
- Base = (root) + (at least 1 suffix)
- Theme = (base) + (modal suffix) OR (stem type) OR (allomorph of a root)
- Word = (theme) + (final suffix) + (optional postfix)

=== Morphophonemics ===
Below is a list of frequently occurring morphophonemic rules which Broadbent (1964) defines as "a rule of phonologically conditioned variation which applies to all morphemes, or allomorphs, of suitable morphophonemic shape.".

- The morphophonemic sequence /ij/ is pronounced as /i:/.
- The morphophoneme /H/ is pronounced as /:/ ~ /Ø/.
  - zero /Ø/ occurs when followed by one consonant that is followed by any type of juncture, or if it is preceded by a consonant cluster.
  - length /:/ occurs elsewhere.
- The morphophoneme /X/ is also pronounced as /:/ ~ /Ø/.
  - length /:/ occurs between a vowel and a single consonant, but lengthens the following consonant e.g. VXCV is pronounced as VCCV
  - zero /Ø/ occurs elsewhere.
- The morphophoneme /Y/ is pronounced as /ɨ/ ~ /u/ ~/o/.
  - if the preceding vowel is /u/, /Y/ is pronounced as /u/.
  - if the preceding vowel is /o/, /Y/ is pronounced as either /u/ or /o/.
  - /Y:/ is pronounced as /u:/.
  - /Y/ is pronounced as /ɨ/ elsewhere.

=== Verbal themes ===
Verbal Themes are morpheme sequences followed immediately by pronominal (final) suffixes.

- Present Imperfect Indicative (-Ø-), [final suffix[theme[base hɨwa:-t]-Ø]-ma:] hɨwa:tma: "I am running"
- Present Perfect Indicative (-ak-), /k/ is deleted if the final suffix is length /-:/. Below is a discussion of the various allomorphs of (-ak-):
  - /-ak-/ ~ /-a-/: occurs if the base ends in any consonant e.g. [final suffix[theme[base hɨwa:-t]-ak]-Ø] hɨwa:tak "I ran just now"
  - /-nak-/ ~ /-na-/: occurs if the base ends in any short vowel e.g. ʔenpu-nak-muhme: "you chased us"
  - /-hak-/ ~ /-ha-/: occurs if the base ends in any long vowel e.g. not͡ʃu:-ha-: "he cried"
- Present Imperative (-eH-). Below is a discussion of the various allomorphs of (-eH-):
  - /-ni-/ ~ (/-n-/ ~ /-X-/): occurs after the following verbal suffixes, /-jikk-/, /-na-/ benefactive, /-na-/ causative, /-nY-/, /-nHukku-/ causative.
  - /-X-/: occurs after suffixes /-:hi-/, /-jo-/, /-lo-/, /-po-/, /-ehi-/ and /-wo-/ e.g. kal-jo-X-ʔ "kick him!"
  - /-Ø-/: occurs between suffixes /-:hi-/ and /-muhme:-/, after /-ŋHe-/, after /-tkuH-/ and after the following irregular verb bases /ʔuhhuH-/ "to drink", /ʔɨwwɨH-/ "to eat", /ʔut͡ʃt͡ʃuH-/ "to stay", /wɨH-/ "to go", /kottoH-/ "to go on ahead" and /talliH-/ "to arise e.g. wɨH-Ø-ti: "let's go!"
  - /-koX-/: occurs after bases ending in vowels and the allomorph /-k-/ of the verbal suffix [-ksY-]
  - /-eH-/: occurs elsewhere e.g.[final suffix[theme[base hɨwa:-t]-eH]-ʔ] hɨwa:teʔ "run!"

Below is a chart of allomorphs of common Southern Sierra Miwok irregular verbal bases.

Present Imperfect	Present Perfect	Imperative	English
nocuH-	nocc- ~ noccu:-	nocc-eH-	"to cry"
ʔuhuH-	ʔuhhu:-	ʔuhhuH-Ø-	"to drink"
ʔywwy-	ʔywwy:-	ʔywwyH-Ø-	"to eat"
ʔuccu-	ʔuccu:-	ʔuccuH-Ø-	"to stay"
wy:-	wy:-	wyH-Ø-	"to go"
kotto-	kotto:-	kottoH-Ø-	"to go on ahead"
(none)	talli:-	talliH-Ø-	"to arise"
(none)	hyj:- ~ hyjjy:-	hyj:-eH-	"to see"
(none)	ʔell-	ʔell-eH-	"to leave"

=== Verbal suffixes ===
Verbal suffixes occur before the verbal theme and, along with the root, form the base of the word. Southern Sierra Miwok has many verbal suffixes, most of which are fully productive and can be applied to any stem of an appropriate shape, class and meaning. Verbal suffixes have derivational meanings. Furthermore, each verbal suffix has rules and requirements as to the shape of the stem that it can follow e.g. the suffix /-cc-/ "static" must follow a stem that is shaped CV- or CVCV- or CVCVCV-. In the instance that a stem does not end in the appropriate form, either length /:/ or a glottal stop /ʔ/ will be added where a consonant is needed or /Y/ when a vowel is needed.

Also, many suffixes display allomorphy depending on the following modal suffix. In these cases, the suffix spoken before the present imperfect zero suffix /-Ø-/ is treated as the basic form. Lastly, two or more verbal suffixes often appear in the same word. Usually, the morphemes are ordered by immediate constituency, however, they can also be ordered depending on the stem-shape requirements of the last two suffixes of the base. In addition, some suffix combinations have separate stem requirements unlike if the suffixes were to appear alone. Below is an example of a typical verbal suffix:

- /-mhi-/, reciprocal. This is a fully productive suffix that can follow any stem but appears as /-mh-/ before the present perfect and imperative modal suffixes. The following present perfect form is either /-ak-/ or /-a-/ and the imperative is /-eH-/.
  - ʔammymhi "to exchange gifts"
  - hywa:tymhe:ti: "let's run a race!"
  - ʔelŋemhappu: "they have left each other"

=== Nominal themes ===
Nominal themes refer to theme suffixes that are followed directly by case markings or by Series 1 or 2 pronominal suffixes (see Syntax) before the case marker. These themes can be hard for native English speakers to learn as many of them do not translate to English nouns but can be translated as past or future tense English verbs or verbal phrases. However, most forms which translate to English nouns, adverbs and adjectives are included as nominal themes. The three categories of nominal themes are:

- Class 1: nominal themes which are always followed by Series 1 pronominal suffixes
  - These themes usually correspond to English verbal expressions such as ʔenpu-ni- “can chase”
- Class 2: nominal themes which are always followed by Series 2 pronominal suffixes
  - Similar to class 1 nominal themes, these also usually correspond to English verbal expressions
- Class 3: nominal themes which can be followed by either Series 1 or Series 2 pronominal suffixes (with differences of meaning) or that are followed by case marking alone.
  - This is the largest class and includes all monomorphemic nominal themes such as neH “this” and hawakkac “sucker fish” and are typically translated as English nouns, adjectives or adverbs. When class 3 nominal themes are followed by Series 1 pronominal suffixes, they take on a possessive meaning (i.e. my dog) but when they are followed by Series 2 pronominal suffixes, they generally take on a subject-predicate construction (i.e. I am a chief).

==== Independent personal pronouns ====
Southern Sierra Miwok does not require the use of independent personal pronouns. Instead, they are used in the nominative and accusative cases for emphasis and clarification, their roots are as follows:

	singular	plural
1st person	kanni-	mahhi-
2nd person	mi-	mi-ko-
3rd person	ʔissak-	ʔissak-koH-

==== Demonstrative roots ====
The following three demonstrative roots are class 3 nominal themes and are among the shortest roots in the language. They can be followed by a number of different suffixes and usually change considerably in meaning according to the attached suffix, they are:

- /neH-/ “this;here”: This theme refers to a location near the speaker. Occasionally, /neH-/ is found followed by a case suffix or the postfix ʔok. In this instance, it can replace the third person singular independent pronoun. However, unlike an independent personal pronoun, it can also be followed by the instrumental case. Furthermore, when followed by the ablative, allative or locative case, /neH-/ usually means “(from, to or at) this place, here”. The following are some possible combinations using /neH-/:
  - neH-wi-n “uphill”
  - ne-pu-ksY- “this is the way it is”
- /ʔi-/ “that;there”: This theme refers to a location far away from the location of the speaker. /ʔi-/, like /neH-/, can also replace a third person pronoun, and when it is followed by the ablative, allative or locative cases it usually means “(from, to or at) this place, there”. The following are some possible combinations using /ʔi-/:
  - ʔi-cc “to do that; to choose that one; to mean”
  - ʔi-wwi-n “now”
  - ʔi-ni-(case) “that one”
- /mi-/ “what?”: This theme occurs with an “information, please” meaning. The following are some possible combinations using /mi-/:
  - mi-taH-n “when?”
  - mi-nni “where?”
  - mitokho “how many?”

=== Nominal suffixes ===
Nominal suffixes are similar to verbal suffixes in that each suffix requires a particular stem shape to precede it and if there is not a necessary vowel or consonant before the suffix, /Y/ or /ʔ/ is added. Furthermore, some nominal suffixes are productive while others are not. Nominal suffixes also tend to have fewer allomorphs than verbal suffixes. Lastly, nominal themes may occur either word-medially or in the prefinal position before case or Series 1 or 2 pronominal suffixes. However, many follow class 3 nominal themes. Below is an example of a typical nominal suffix:

- /-kuH-/, evidential passive predicative. This suffix follows stem form CVCVC-, and when necessary, the final C is filled by /ʔ/. The themes that end in this suffix are members of class 3. /-kuH-/is fully productive.
  - lacyn-kuH- "blaze"
  - kuhat-kuH- "you can see it has been hit"
  - wemyʔ-kuH- "there’s a hole, you can see it has been dug"

=== Postfixes ===
These affixes follow final suffixes such as pronominal suffixes and case, and are not obligatory. Furthermore, more than one postfix may occur in a Southern Sierra Miwok word. In these instances, the postfixes occur in a definite sequence. In addition, all postfixes are invariable in form and therefore do not contain more than one allomorph. Below is an example of a typical postfix:

- /-hoʔ/ “and”. This postfix can follow verbs and nouns and can be found both in narrative texts and in conversation.
  - neH-Ø-t-hoʔ ʔi-ni-t-Ø-hoʔ “here and there”

=== Particles ===
Southern Sierra Miwok also has a class of monomorphemic words called particles. These are the only words that can stand alone as roots without suffixes and usually follow the word that they modify. hane: "maybe", hy:ʔy: "yes" and jej "hey!" are a few examples of typical particles.

== Syntax ==
=== Personal pronominal suffixes ===
Personal pronominal suffixes are separated into four series in the Southern Sierra Miwok language. As discussed in the morphology section, Series 1 and 2 pronominal suffixes follow nominal themes and precede case markings, whereas Series 3 and 4 pronominal suffixes follow verbal themes. Series 3 and 4 are also more complex as they distinguish first person inclusive (speaker + addressee) and exclusive (speaker only). Furthermore, pronominal suffixes can refer to both the subject and the object of the sentence; these are called double pronominal suffixes. However, the subject cannot be included in the object and vice versa i.e. "I am doing it for you" is an acceptable phrase to use a double pronominal suffix, but, "I am doing it for us" is not acceptable because "I" is included in "us/we".

Personal pronominal suffixes
Subject	Object	Series 1	Series 2	Series 3	Series 4
1SG		-nti-	-te-	-ma:	-m
1SG	2SG	-ni..kan	-ni:te-	-mussu:	-ni:
1SG	2PL	-tokni..kan	-tokni:te-	-mutoksu:	-tokni:
1PL		-tti-	-me-		
1PL	2SG	-ni..mahhi:	-ni:me-	-niʔmahhi:	-niʔmahhi:
1PL	2PL	-tokni..mahhi:	-tokni:me-	-tokniʔmakki:	-tokni?mahhi:
1PL.INCL				-ticci:	-ticci:
1PL.EXCL				-mahhi:	-mahhi:
2SG		-nY:	-ni-	-sY:	-ʔ
2SG	1SG	-te..nY:	-te:ni-	-mu:	-:
2SG	1PL	-me..nY:	-me:ni-	-muhme:	-muhme:
2PL		-mYko:	-tokni-	-toksu:	-ci:i:
2PL	1SG	-te..mYko:	-te:tokni-	-mucci:	-tYcci:
2PL	1PL	-me..mYko:	-me:tokni-	-tokmuhme:	-tokmuhme:
3SG		-hY:	-Ø-	-:	-nih
3SG	1SG	-te..hY:	-te:	-:teʔ	-nihteʔ
3SG	2SG	-ni..hY:	-ni:	-:niʔ	-nihniʔ
3SG	1PL	-me..hY:	-me:	-:meʔ	-nihmeʔ
3SG	2PL	-toknu..hY:	-tokni:	-:tokniʔ	-nihtokniʔ
3PL		-ko:	-koH-	-ppu:	-nihko:
3PL	1SG	-te..ko:	-te:ko:	-pputeʔ	-nihteko:
3PL	2SG	-ni..ko:	-ni:ko:	-ppuniʔ	-nihniko:
3PL	1PL	-me..ko:	-me:ko:	-ppumeʔ	-nihmeko:
3PL	2PL	-tokni..ko:	-tokmi:ko:	-pputokniʔ	-nihtokniko:

Below is a table that lists the various pronominal suffix morphemes for Southern Sierra Miwok organized by series number:

	1 Singular	2 Singular	3 Singular	1 Plural	2 Plural	3 Plural
Series 1a	-nti-			-tti-		
Series 1b	-kan	-nY:	-hY:	-mahhi:		
Series 2a	-te-	-ni-	-Ø	-me-		
Series 2b	-te:-	-ni:-		-me:-		
Series 2c	-teʔ	-niʔ		-meʔ		
Series 3a	-ma:	-sY:	-:	-tiH-		-ppu:
Series 3b	-Ø-					
Series 4a	-m	-ʔ	-nih-		-cci:	
Series 4b		-Ø				
Series 4c		-:				
Series 4d		-h-				

=== Case marking ===
Southern Sierra Miwok is unique among Native American languages as it has nine case suffixes. For the purposes of discussion, Broadbent (1964) has separated the case suffixes into two categories, autonomous, which appear in the absolute final position of a word, and subordinate, which must be followed by an autonomous case suffix. Of these, four are considered autonomous, four are considered subordinate and one, the possessive (or genitive) case, can function as either autonomous or subordinate. Furthermore, the names given to each case suffix do not necessarily reflect the full range of their applications from the point of view of their Latin grammar counterparts. For example, the accusative case is mostly but not exclusively used for direct objects of a particular sentence.

==== Autonomous ====
- Nominative case: This case is found in a variety of environments such as on the subjects of verbs, on forms which modify subjects of verbs, on nouns in isolation, in predicative or coordinate constructions involving nouns, and as the autonomous case where a subordinate case suffix is used. The suffix varies between /-Ø/, when the preceding morpheme ends in any consonant other that /H/, and /-ʔ/ elsewhere. The following are examples of common nominative case usages:
  - naŋŋaH-ʔ "the man"
  - naŋŋaH-ʔ cytyH-ʔ "the good man; the man is good"
  - hissik-Ø "the skunk"
  - lakyhee-Ø-ʔ "he came out"
- Accusative case: This case is found on direct objects of sentences unless it is in a sentence with both direct and indirect objects in which case the accusative suffix falls on the indirect object and the instrumental case is used for the direct object. Furthermore, after certain types of nominal themes, the accusative case has a temporal meaning, "after", "while" or "during". The accusative case has the form /-j/ and is preceded by /Y/ when it follows a theme ending in any consonant other than /H/. The following are examples of common accusative case usages:
  - hukkuHjhu: "his head (accusative)"
  - kawlypaj "all morning"
  - henissemej "after we rested"
- Temporal case: This case is usually found following the nominal suffix /-no-/ "time, season" and is often used on Southern Sierra Miwok words that translate into English adverbs referencing time, but is also used in other words meaning "higher" and "slowly". Although the meaning is somewhat obscure, it mostly references location in time or space. The temporal case has the suffix form /-n/. The following are examples of common temporal case usages:
  - hojeHnon "tomorrow"
  - kottaHn "far off"
- Vocative case: This case is used only in forms used as terms of address. The suffix is /-Ø/ when following a consonant and /-:/ elsewhere. The following are examples of common vocative case usages:
  - ʔypyH-: "Father!"
  - ʔyta-: "Mother!"
  - hissik-Ø "Skunk!"

==== Subordinate ====
- Ablative case: This case carries the meaning of "from" or "away from". When following a vowel or the cluster /VH/, the ablative allomorph /-mm-/ is used, but when following any consonant other than /H/ the allomorph /-m-/ is used. The ablative case is usually followed by the nominative case but can also be followed by the accusative or by the prefinal nominal suffix /-ttY-/. The following are example of common vocative case usages:
  - ʔuucu-mm-uʔ "from the house"
  - ʔuucu-mm-ʔhY: "from his house"
  - wakal-m-ttiʔ "from our creek"
- Allative case: This case, in most environments, means "to, towards; at, in, near, on". However, following a present imperfect verbal theme, it takes on a past tense meaning, and after an imperative verbal theme it means "if I...;if you...etc". The allative suffix appears as /-t-/ when the preceding theme ends in a vowel or /VH/ or the nominative case, elsewhere it appears as /-tHo-/. The allative case is usually followed by the nominative case, but the accusative is also possible. The following are examples of common allative case usages:
  - la:ma-t-Ø "at the tree"
  - hollop-tHo-ʔ "in the hole"
  - kacc-Ø-t-Ø "he said"
- Locative case: This case carries the meaning "in, on, at". The locative suffix morpheme is /-m-/. When the preceding morpheme ends in a vowel, the following nominative case appears as zero, but if the preceding morpheme ends in a consonant, the following nominative case appears as /-ʔ/. Other than the nominative case, the locative case can be followed by the nominal suffix /-to-/, postfixes and in rare occurrences, the diminutive suffix /-ccY-/. The following are examples of common locative case usages:
  - hollop-m-uʔ "in the hole"
  - cuʔpaH-m-Ø "in the middle"
- Instrumental case: This case suffix carries the meaning "with, by means of". When used in a sentence with both a direct and an indirect object, the instrumental case marks the direct object in a sentence such as "to (do something) for (someone)". The instrumental case can be followed by the nominative case. The instrumental case suffix is /-Hs-/. The following are examples of common instrumental case usages:
  - jawwe-Hs-Ø "with a bow"
  - jawwenti-Hs-Ø "with my bow"
  - ʔenyhnama: jawwe-Hs haja:puj "I am making a bow for the chief"

==== Possessive ====
- Genitive case: This case can function as either autonomous or subordinate and carries the possessive meaning. As an autonomous suffix, it has the suffix /-ŋ/, but as a subordinate suffix it is /-ŋŋ-/. The subordinate suffix can be followed by either nominative or accusative cases. The following are common examples of common genitive case usages:
  - hikaHh-ŋ "the deer's"
  - manaX-ŋŋ-ʔ "whose is it?"
  - ʔissak-ŋŋ-ʔ "it is his"

=== Word order ===
Due to the rich case system in Southern Sierra Miwok, the word order is of little to no importance to the syntax or semantics. For example, naŋŋaʔ halki: hika:hyj; naŋŋaʔ hika:hyj halki:; hika:hyj naŋŋaʔ halki:; and halki: naŋŋaʔ hika:hyj in which, naŋŋaʔ means "the man, nominative case", halki: means "he is hunting" and hika:hyj means "deer, accusative case" so each sentence given above regardless of the order means: "the man is hunting the deer".

=== Sentence types ===
Southern Sierra Miwok contains three syntactic substitution classes, nominal expressions, verbal expressions and particles. Some members of each class can stand alone as a complete utterance. To form more complex sentences, members of the different classes are combined. Below are examples of possible complete utterances:

- Certain particles in isolation:
  - hy:ʔy: "yes"
  - ken "no"
- A nominative expression:
  - ʔypy: "Father!"
  - naŋŋaʔ cytyʔ "the man is good" (nominative case)
  - ʔisʔok cyllas "with this awl" (instrumental case)
- A nominative expression with one or more particles:
  - ʔi:ʔok hane: "That must be it"
  - hy:ʔy: tamaʔhoʔ ʔi:ʔok "Yes, those sourberries"
- A verbal expression:
  - cy:lyma: "I'm weaving"
  - micyknanintiʔ "What can I do?"
- A verbal expression with one or more particles:
  - kella:meʔ hane: "Maybe it's going to snow on us"
  - hyjjiccyppu: paʔis sikej "They are looking at it so earnestly"
- A verbal expression with one or more nominal expressions:
  - sypes ʔolluʔuhhuko: tollet pattytyt "With a digging stick, they would dig in the hard ground"
- A verbal expression with one or more secondary verbal expressions:
  - ʔitanʔok hojeʔ, keŋo:tuʔuhhuko: leppathoj "Then next they would gather it up, being finished"
  - ʔespaniniʔkan, miʔlek sikej cinnipiccyniʔ, tehhyhniʔ sikej ʔi:ʔok ʔipuksʔajny:ʔok, lotuksuʔajny: ʔi:ʔok hawaj "I can help you, you are very small, you are very light to be doing that, to be holding on to that rock"
- Two or more verbal expressions in coordinate constructions:
  - lu:tiʔ ʔojiswi:jy:, lu:tiʔ ʔotikwi:jy: "Some quarter it, some divide it in two"

== Documentary history ==
Field recordings of Southern Sierra Miwok were made in the 1950s by linguist Sylvia M. Broadbent, and several speakers, especially Chris Brown, Castro Johnson, and Alice Wilson.

== See also ==
- Miwok
- Valley and Sierra Miwok
- Penutian

== Sources ==
- Broadbent, Sylvia (1964), "The Southern Sierra Miwok Language", University of California Publications in Linguistics, 38, Berkeley, CA: University of California Press
- Callaghan, Catherine (2001), "More evidence for Yok-Utian: A reanalysis of the Dixon and Kroeber sets", International Journal of American Linguistics, 67 (3): 313–346, doi:10.1086/466461, S2CID 145406834
- Mithun, Marianne (1999), The Languages of Native North America, Cambridge: Cambridge University Press, ISBN 0-521-23228-7
- Sloan, Kelly Dawn. (1991). Syllables and Templates: Evidence from Southern Sierra Miwok. Cambridge, MA. MIT Doctoral Dissertation
