= Lake Miwok =

Branch of the Miwok

Lake Miwok People
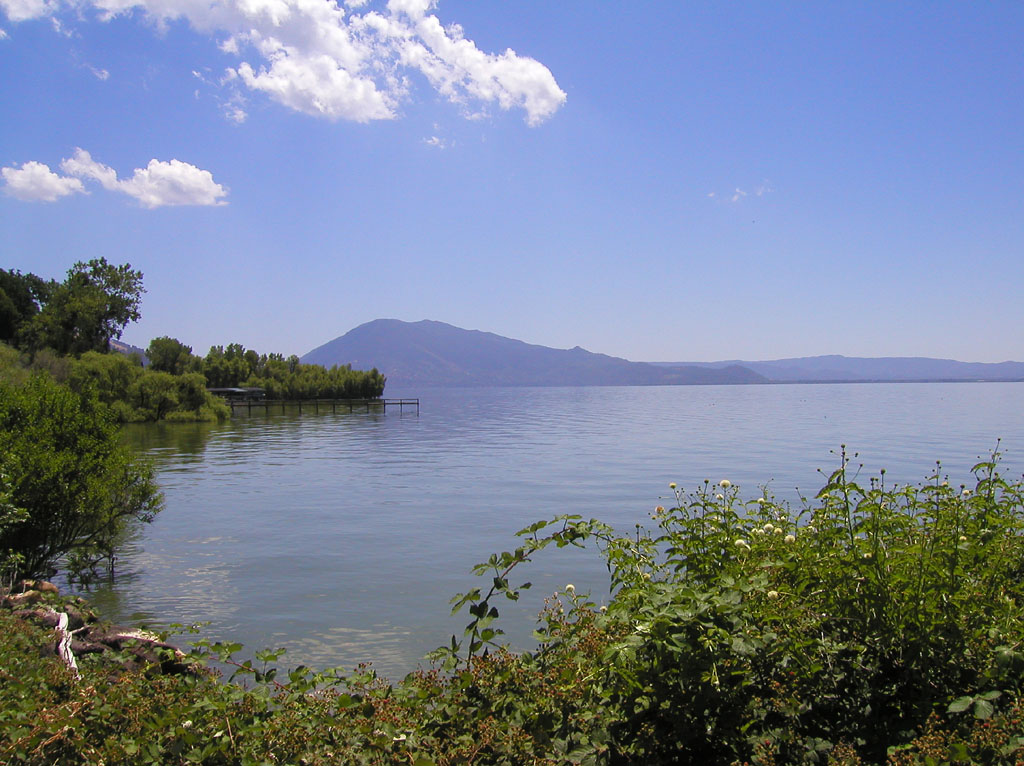
- Clear Lake, California, is the homeland of the Lake Miwok

Total population
- 1770: 500; 1850: 100; 1880: 20

Regions with significant populations
- California: Lake County

Languages
- English, formerly Lake Miwok language

Religion
- Shamanism: Kuksu: Miwok mythology

Related ethnic groups
- Miwok: Plains & Sierra Miwok; Coast Miwok; Bay Miwok

Map of lake Miwok territory prior to contact

The Lake Miwok are a branch of the Miwok, a Native American people of Northern California. The Lake Miwok lived in the Clear Lake basin of what is now called Lake County. While they did not have an overarching name for themselves, the Lake Miwok word for people, Hotsa-ho, was suggested by A. L. Kroeber as a possible endonym, keeping with a common practice among tribal groups and the ethnographers studying them in the early 20th Century and with the term Miwok itself, which is the Central Sierra Miwok word for people.

== Culture ==
The Lake Miwok spoke their own Lake language in the Utian linguistic group. They lived by hunting and gathering, and lived in small bands without centralized political authority. They were skilled at basketry.

=== Religion ===
The original Lake Miwok people world view included Shamanism, one form this took was the Kuksu religion that was evident in Central and Northern California, which included elaborate acting and dancing ceremonies in traditional costume, an annual mourning ceremony, puberty rites of passage, shamanic intervention with the spirit world and an all-male society that met in subterranean dance rooms. Kuksu was shared with other indigenous ethnic groups of Central California, such as their neighbors the Lake Pomo, also Maidu, Ohlone, Esselen, and northernmost Yokuts. However Kroeber observed less "specialized cosmogony" in the Miwok, which he termed one of the "southern Kuksu-dancing groups", in comparison to the Maidu and other northern California tribes.

=== Traditional Narratives ===
In their myths, legends, tales, and histories, the Lake Miwok participated in the general cultural pattern of Central California.

==== Mythology ====
Lake Miwok mythology and narratives were similar to other natives of Central and Northern California. The Lake Miwok believed in animal and human spirits, and saw the animal spirits as their ancestors. Coyote was seen as their ancestor and creator god.

=== Cuisine ===
The Lake Miwok tribe had access to a wide range of food sources. Oak trees were plentiful in their area, and acorns served as a staple food. Buckeye nuts were processed similarly to acorns—ground into flour and cooked into a thick porridge. Pepperwood tree berries (also called California laurel) were transformed into cakes or brewed into a beverage that tasted similar to chocolate. Manzanita berries were dried, ground into flour, rolled into balls, and eaten as a sweet treat. The tribe also consumed nuts from yellow pine and sugar pine trees, along with seeds extracted from pine cones. Yellow jacket larvae were roasted and eaten as a protein source. Additionally, grasshoppers were roasted and included in their diet.

== Authentic Villages ==
The authenticated Lake Miwok villages are:

- Near present-day town of Lower Lake: Kado'(?)'-yomi-pukut (at Cookman Ranch), Tu'bud or Tu'bul (on Asbill property toward Lower Lake), Tule'-yomi (2–3 miles south town).
- Near present-day Middletown: Laka'h-yomi (on Weldon's ranch), La'lmak-pukut (north end).
- In Pope Valley: Kai-yomi-pukut, TsBk-yomi-pukut or ShOkomi (3 miles below the present-day store or town).
- In Coyote Valley: Kala'u-yomi, Kilinyo-ke (at Eaton Ranch), Ki'tsin-pukut (at Gamble), Ole'-yomi (on the Berry place), Sha'lshal-pukut (at Ashbill), Shandk-yomi-pukut (at Asbill).
- In Jerusalem Valley: Wodi'daitepi.
- Northern Clear Lake Basin: Kawi-yomi, (perhaps originally Pomo), Tsitsa-pukut.
- Other villages: Tumi'stumis-pukut, 'Tsu'keliwa-pukut (At the 'new' Siegler swimming resort), Wi'lok-yomi (near the present rancheria or reservation but may have been Wappo), Yawl'-yomi-pukut (North of Siegler swimming resort in a canyon),

== History ==
The Lake Miwok were neighbors with the Pomo, Coast Miwok and Wappo people. A percentage of the Lake Miwok were coaxed circa 1800-1840 into the Spanish Missions along with their neighbors the Coast Miwok, particularly to the Mission San Francisco Solano in Sonoma once it was built. "The mission records show 21 baptism records exist from "Tuyeome and Oleyome indicating definite (mission) penetration by 1835 as far as the shores of Clear Lake, but not indicating wholesome conversion in that region."

The natives of Clear Lake suffered tremendous loss of life and were virtually decimated during the regional smallpox epidemic of 1837 that came from Fort Ross.

== Population ==
In 1770 there about 400-500 Lake Miwok. In 1848 population estimated at 200, In 1850 it dropped to 100. In 1880 and 1920 it was estimated at 20.

== See also ==
- Fully feathered basket
