= Bay Miwok =

Tribe of Native America people

Bay Miwok People
- Mount Diablo is in the homeland of the Bay Miwok, and figures in their legends and myths.

Total population
- 1770: 1,700; 1850: not known 1880: not known

Regions with significant populations
- California: Contra Costa County

Languages
- Utian: Bay Miwok (Saclan)

Religion
- Shamanism: Kuksu: Miwok mythology

Related ethnic groups
- Miwok: Plains & Sierra Miwok; Coast Miwok; Lake Miwok

The Bay Miwok are a cultural and linguistic group of Miwok, a Native American people in Northern California who live in Contra Costa County. They joined the Franciscan mission system during the early nineteenth century, suffered a devastating population decline, and lost their language as they intermarried with other native California ethnic groups and learned the Spanish language.

The Bay Miwok were not recognized by modern anthropologists or linguists until the mid-twentieth century. In fact, Alfred L. Kroeber, father of California anthropology, who knew of one of their constituent local groups, the Saklan (Saclan), from nineteenth-century manuscript sources, presumed that they spoke an Ohlone (a.k.a. Costanoan) language.

In 1955 linguist Madison Beeler recognized an 1821 vocabulary taken from a Saclan man at Mission San Francisco as representative of a Miwok language. The language was named "Bay Miwok" and its territorial extent was rediscovered during the 1960s (see Landholding Groups or Local Tribes section below).

== Culture ==
The Bay Miwok lived by hunting and gathering, and lived in small bands without centralized political authority. They spoke Bay Miwok also known as Saclan. They were skilled at basketry.

=== Religion ===
The original Bay Miwok people's world view was a form of Shamanism. As they were centrally located along an arc of Miwok-speaking groups across Central California, the Bay Miwok probably shared the Kuksu religion ceremonial motifs common to both the Coast Miwok to the west and Plains Miwok to the east. The Kuksu religion (dubbed the Kuksu Cult by early historians) included a cycle of elaborate dancing ceremonies, each with its own group of actors and distinctive feather-decorated regalia, an all-male society that met in subterranean dance rooms, puberty rites of passage, shamanic intervention with the spirit world, and, in some areas, an annual mourning ceremony. Varying forms of the Kuksu Cult were shared with other indigenous ethnic groups of Central California, such as their neighbors the northern Ohlone, Maidu, Patwin, Pomo, and Wappo. However Kroeber observed less "specialized cosmogony" in the Miwok, which he termed one of the "southern Kuksu-dancing groups", in comparison to the Maidu and other northern California tribes.

=== Traditional narratives and mythology ===
The specific myths, legends, tales, and histories of the Bay Miwok are not well documented. C. Hart Merriam published a creation story, The Birth of Wek-Wek and the Creation of Man, centered on Mt. Diablo, that was told by a Hool-poom'-ne Miwok, perhaps a descendant of the Julpun Bay Miwok of Marsh Creek, eastern Contra Costa County.

One might suspect that the full corpus of Bay Miwok mythology and sacred narrative shared the motifs that the linguistically related and better-documented ethnographic Coast Miwok and Sierra Miwok held in common. All Miwok peoples believed in animal and human spirits, and saw the animal spirits as their ancestors. Coyote was seen as the representation of their creator god. The Sierra and Plains Miwok, as well as the Bay Miwok, believed this world began at Mount Diablo, following a flood.

== Landholding groups or local tribes ==
The names and general territorial areas of seven Bay Miwok-speaking land-holding groups have been inferred through indirect methods, based for the most part on information in the ecclesiastical records of missions San Francisco and San Jose. In a 1961 Ph.D. dissertation, James Bennyhoff used data from the Alphonse Pinart transcripts of the mission records to identify four more East Bay local territorial groups, in addition to the Saclan, as members of this unique Miwok language group. "The major clues to the linguistic affiliation of these river mouth tribelets are provided by the personal names of female neophytes recorded in the baptismal registers ... Ompin, Chupcan, Julpun, and Wolwon [Volvon-ed.] are linked together by the use of a distinctive constellation of endings which appear in female personal names," he wrote. Milliken subsequently used the same technique, applied to the original mission records, to identify two additional local tribes—Jalquin and Tatcan—as Bay Miwok speakers. Milliken then inferred and mapped the relative locations of all seven groups, using clues from historic diaries together with mission register information regarding intermarriage patterns among East Bay local tribes. The locations of the seven Bay Miwok local tribes are generally as follows:

- At and surrounding present-day City of Concord: Chupcan.
- At Mt. Diablo, surrounding present-day City of Clayton and east along Marsh Creek to Brentwood: Volvon (also spelled Wolwon, and Bolbon).
- Along lower Marsh Creek (east of Antioch): Julpun.
- At present-day City of Pittsburg and north to rural south Solano County: Ompin .
- At and surrounding present-day cities of Lafayette and Walnut Creek: Saclan.
- At and surrounding present-day City of Danville, on San Ramon Creek: Tatcan.
- In south portion of present-day City of Oakland, in present City of San Leandro, and on San Leandro Creek to the east: Jalquin.

Another group, the Yrgin of present-day City of Hayward and Castro Valley, had Chochenyo Ohlone signature female name endings, rather than Bay Miwok name endings. Yet they were so highly intermarried with the Jalquin that it seems possible that they and the Jalquin formed a single bilingual local tribe.

== History ==
Documentation of Miwok peoples dates back as early as 1579 by a priest on a ship under the command of Francis Drake. Identification and references to the Bay Miwok tribes exists from California Mission records as early as 1794.

Spanish-American Franciscans set up Catholic missions in the Bay Area in the 1770s, but did not reach the Bay Miwok territory until 1794. Beginning in 1794, the Bay Miwoks were forced to migrate to the Franciscan missions, most to Mission San Francisco de Asís (of San Francisco), but some others to Mission San José (in present-day Fremont). All but the Ompin and Julpun in the northeast were at the missions by the end of 1806; the latter two groups moved to Mission San José during the 1810-1812 period. The first baptisms and emigration to the missions of each tribe were:

- In 1794-1795, 143 Saclans were baptized at the San Francisco Mission (25 more in later years).
- In 1799-1805, 152 Yrgins were baptized at the San Jose Mission.
- In 1801-1803, 77 Jalquins were baptized at the San Francisco Mission.
- In 1804, 127 Tatcans were baptized at San Francisco Mission.
- In 1805, 44 Volvons were baptized at the San Jose Mission; another 54 were baptized at Mission San Francisco over 1805-1806.
- In 1810, 146 Chupcans were baptized at the San Francisco Mission.
- In 1811, 103 Julpuns were baptized at the San Jose Mission; others fled to the east and north, and continued to come in for baptism until as late as 1827.
- In 1811, 99 Ompins were baptized at the San Jose Mission; 15 more were baptized in 1812.

Missionary linguist Felipe Arroyo de la Cuesta obtained the only extant Bay Miwok vocabulary during a visit to Mission San Francisco in 1821.

== Population change over time ==
Estimates for the precontact populations of most native groups in California have varied substantially. (See Population of Native California.) Alfred L. Kroeber put the 1770 population of the Plains and Sierra Miwok (but excluding the Bay Miwok, about whom he was not aware) at 9,000. Sherburne Cook carried out a more specific analysis of contact-period population in Alameda and Contra Costa counties west of the San Joaquin Valley, without regard to the Ohlone-Bay Miwok language boundary; he suggested a total population of 2,248. Richard Levy estimated 19,500 people for all five Eastern Miwok groups as a whole (Bay, Plains, Northern Sierra, Central Sierra, and Southern Sierra) prior to Spanish contact, and 1,700 specifically for the Bay Miwok.

A total of 859 Bay Miwok speakers were baptized at the Franciscan missions (479 at Mission San Francisco and 380 at Mission San Jose), most between 1794 and 1812. By the end of 1823, only 52 of the Mission San Francisco Bay Miwoks were still alive, along with 11 of their Mission-born children. No comparable data are available for Mission San Jose that year, but by 1840 only 20 Bay Miwok people were alive there. Late nineteenth century survivors from both missions intermarried with people from other language groups. Descendants are alive today (see Present Day section below).

== Present day ==
The Muwekma Ohlone Tribe of the San Francisco Bay Area states that it includes the descendants of various Bay Miwok and Ohlone groups, including the previously federally recognized Verona Band of Alameda County. The Bureau of Indian Affairs denied the tribe's request for federal recognition in 2002, and other tribal groups have disputed their land claims.

== Notable Bay Miwok people ==
- 1795 – Potroy, leader of a 1795 revolt and flight from Mission San Francisco by newly Christianized Saclans, he was arrested by Spanish soldiers in 1797, tried, and sentenced to three sets of whippings and one year in shackles at the San Francisco Presidio.
- 1801 – Liberato Culpecse, born Jalquin, baptized at the Mission San Francisco in 1801, one of the main ancestors of the present day Muwekma Tribal community.

== See also ==
- Miwok
