= Indian potato =

Indian potato is a common name for several plants and may refer to:

- Apios americana, a terrestrial plant native to eastern North America
- Orogenia, a formerly recognized plant genus native to western North America, now included in Lomatium
- Sagittaria latifolia, an aquatic plant native to North and South America
