= Lake Miwok language =

Language of California, US

Lake Miwok
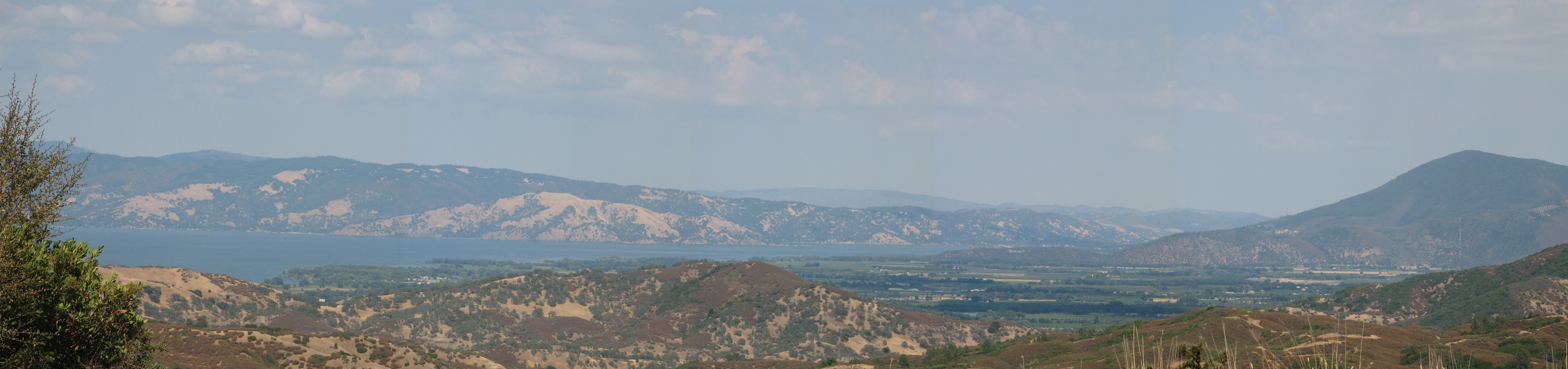
- Clear Lake
- Native to: United States
- Region: Lake County, California
- Ethnicity: Lake Miwok
- Extinct: 1990s
- Language family: Yok-Utian: Utian; Miwokan; Western; Lake Miwok

Language codes
- ISO 639-3: lmw
- Glottolog: lake1258
- ELP: Lake Miwok
- Lake Miwok is classified as Critically Endangered by the UNESCO Atlas of the World's Languages in Danger.

The Lake Miwok language is an extinct language of Northern California, traditionally spoken in an area adjacent to the Clear Lake. It is one of the languages of the Clear Lake Linguistic Area, along with Patwin, East and Southeastern Pomo, and Wappo.

== Phonology ==
=== Vowels ===
| | Short | | Long | |
| | Front | Back | Front | Back |
|---|---|---|---|---|
| High (close) | i | u | iː | uː |
| Mid | e | o | eː | oː |
| Low (open) | a | | aː | |

Examples of words with vowel phonemes
| Vowel | Example |
|---|---|
| /i/ | pawih 'mountain' |
| /iː/ | kiik 'water' |
| /e/ | ʔelaj 'child' |
| /eː/ | nee 'this' |
| /a/ | lakah 'cottonwood' |
| /aː/ | kaa 'door' |
| /o/ | holoh 'lean against' |
| /oː/ | kook 'tail' |
| /u/ | kut 'tooth' |
| /uː/ | ṣuul 'eagle' |

=== Consonants ===
| | | Labial | Dental | Alveolar | Post-alveolar | Palatal | Velar | Glottal |
|---|---|---|---|---|---|---|---|---|
| Plosive | plain | p | ⟨t⟩ t̻ | | ⟨ṭ⟩ t̠̺ | | k | ʔ |
| Plosive | aspirated | pʰ | ⟨tʰ⟩ t̻ʰ | | ⟨ṭʰ⟩ t̠̺ʰ | | kʰ | |
| Plosive | ejective | pʼ | ⟨tʼ⟩ t̻ʼ | | ⟨ṭʼ⟩ t̠̺ʼ | | kʼ | |
| Plosive | voiced | b | | ⟨d⟩ d̺ | | | | |
| Fricative | voiceless | | | s | ⟨ṣ⟩ ʃ | ⟨ł⟩ ɬ | | h |
| Fricative | ejective | | | | | ⟨ƛʼ⟩ t͡ɬʼ | | |
| Affricate | voiceless | | | ⟨c⟩ t͡s | ⟨č⟩ t͡ʃ | | | |
| Affricate | ejective | | | ⟨cʼ⟩ t͡sʼ | ⟨čʼ⟩ t͡ʃʼ | | | |
| Nasal | | m | | n | | | | |
| Approximant | | w | | l (r) | | j | | |

The consonant inventory of Lake Miwok differs substantially from the inventories found in the other Miwok languages. Where the other languages only have one series of plosives, Lake Miwok has four: plain, aspirated, ejective and voiced. Lake Miwok has also added the affricates č, c, čʼ, cʼ, ƛʼ and the liquids r and ł. These sounds appear to have been borrowed through loanwords from other, unrelated languages in the Clear Lake area, after which they spread to some native Lake Miwok words.

== Grammar ==
The word order of Lake Miwok is relatively free, but SOV (subject–object–verb) is the most common order.

=== Verb morphology ===
==== Pronominal clitics ====
| | | Singular | Dual | Plural |
|---|---|---|---|---|
| 1st person | | ka | ʔic | ma, ʔim |
| 2nd person | | ʔin | moc | mon |
| 3rd person | non-reflexive | ʔi | koc | kon |
| 3rd person | reflexive | hana | hanakoc | hanakon |
| indefinite | | ʔan | | |

In her Lake Miwok grammar, Callaghan reports that one speaker distinguishes between 1st person dual inclusive ʔoc and exclusive ʔic. Another speaker also remembers that this distinction used to be made by older speakers.

=== Noun morphology ===
==== Case inflection ====
Nouns can be inflected for ten different cases:

- the Subjective case marks a noun which functions as the subject of a verb. If the subject noun is placed before the verb, the Subjective has the allomorph -n after vowel (or a vowel followed by /h/), and -Ø after consonants. If the noun is placed after the verb, the Subjective is -n after vowels and -nu after consonants.

kukú-n ʔin tíkki-t mékuh
flea-SBJ 2SG forehead-ALL sit
"A flea is sitting on your forehead."

- the Possessive case is -n after vowels and -Ø after consonants.

ʔóle-n ṣúluk
coyote-POSS skin
"coyote skin"

táj-Ø ṣáapa
man-POSS hair
"the man's hair"

- the Objective case marks a noun which functions as the direct or indirect object of a verb. It has the allomorph -u (after a consonant) or -Ø (after a vowel) when the noun is placed immediately before a verb which contains the 2nd person prefix ʔin- (which then has the allomorph -n attached to the noun preceding the verb; compare the example below) or does not contain any subject prefix at all.

káac-u-n ʔúṭe?
fish-OBJ-2SG see
"Did you see the fish?"

It has the allomorph -Ø before a verb containing any other subject prefix:

kawáj-Ø ka ʔúṭe
horse-OBJ 1SG see
"I saw the horse"

If the object noun does not immediately precede the verb, or if the verb is in the imperative, the allomorph of the Objective is -uc:

káac-uc jolúm-mi
fish-OBJ eat-imperative
"Eat the fish"

- the allative case is -to after a consonant, before the first person dual prefix or the second person singular prefix, or after a vowel if the noun is at the end of the phrase:

híi-to-n lákin témma-ṣe
daytime-ALL-2SG dance can-also
"You can dance in the daytime, too."

halíihali-n lákte más kaníi-to
everything-SBJ name - 1SG-ALL
"Everything was named to me."

If the allative case appears after a vowel, most often in non-final position, it appears as -t:

míi-t ʔadée láktek
2SG-ALL be.big too.much
"It's too big for you."

The allative case has a variety of meanings, but often expresses direction towards a goal.

The allative case is also often used with the suffix -(m)pa meaning "onto, to, toward":

níi-muk-pa-t ka-ʔúkan
this-road-onto-ALL 1SG-enter
"I just came into this road."

- the locative case -m gives a less specific designation of locality than the Allative, and occurs more rarely, generally only with an additional locational nominal suffix, such as -wa. An example:

máa-c numáa-wa-m móla
that-OBJ different-at-LOC pile
"She piled that in a different place."

- the ablative case is -mu or -m depending on the context, and marks direction out of, or away from, a place. An example:

pawíh-mu ka-ʔóoni
mountain-ABL 1SG-come
"I come from the mountain."

- the instrumental case -ṭu marks instruments, e.g. tumáj-ṭu "(I hit him) with a stick".
- the comitative case -ni usually translates as "along with", but can also be used to coordinate nouns, as in kaʔunúu-ni ka ʔáppi-ni "my mother and my father".
- the vocative case only occurs with a few kinship terms, e.g. ʔunúu "mother (voc)" from ʔúnu "mother".
- the Appositive case is the citation form of nouns.

==== Possessive clitics ====
Lake Miwok uses pronominal clitics to indicate the possessor of a noun. Except for the 3d person singular, they have the same shape as the nominative pronominal clitics, but show no allomorphy.

| | | Singular | Dual | Plural |
|---|---|---|---|---|
| 1st person | | ka | ʔic | ma |
| 2nd person | | ʔin | moc | mon |
| 3rd person | non-reflexive | ʔiṭi | koc | kon |
| 3rd person | reflexive | hana | hanakoc | hanakon |
| indefinite | | ʔan | | |

The reflexive hana forms have the same referent as the subject of the same clause, whereas the non-reflexive forms have a different referent, e.g.:

- hana háju ʔúṭe – "He sees his own dog"
- ʔiṭi háju ʔúṭe – "He sees (somebody else's) dog"
