= Plains and Sierra Miwok =

Largest group of California Indian Miwok people

Plains and Sierra Miwok People
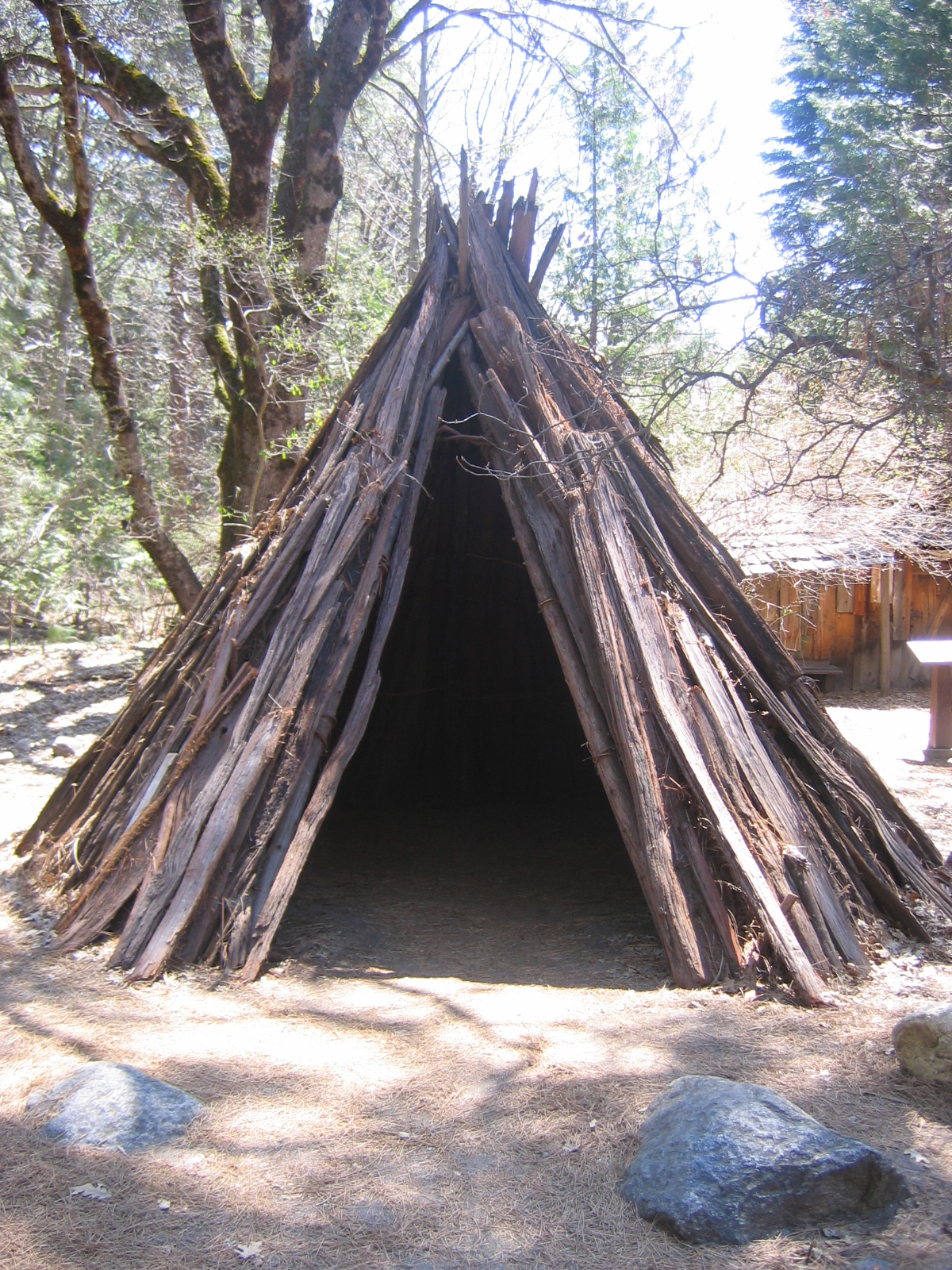
- A Sierra Miwok cedar bark umuucha cabin reproduction in Yosemite Valley. The material came from lumbering operations of 19th century miners. Previously the Miwok lived in rounded huts made of brush and mud.

Total population
- 1770: 9,000-17,800; 1848: 6,000; 1880: 100; 1910: 670

Regions with significant populations
- United States (California): Sierra Nevada, Central Valley

Languages
- Utian: Plains Miwok, Northern Sierra Miwok, Central Sierra Miwok, Southern Sierra Miwok

Religion
- Kuksu; Miwok religion

Related ethnic groups
- Other Miwok peoples: Coast Miwok, Lake Miwok, and Bay Miwok

The Plains and Sierra Miwok were once the largest group of California Indian Miwok people, Indigenous to California. Their homeland included regions of the Sacramento Valley, San Joaquin Valley, and the Sierra Nevada.

== Geography ==
The Plains and Sierra Miwok traditionally lived in the western Sierra Nevada between the Fresno River and Cosumnes River, in the eastern Central Valley of California. As well as in the northern Sacramento–San Joaquin River Delta region at the confluences of the Cosumnes River, Mokelumne River, and Sacramento River.

In the present day, many Sierra Miwok live in or close to their traditional territories and Indian rancherias, including at:

- Buena Vista Rancheria
- Chicken Ranch Rancheria
- Jackson Rancheria
- Sheep Ranch Rancheria
- Shingle Springs Rancheria
- Tuolumne Rancheria
- Wilton Rancheria

== Culture ==
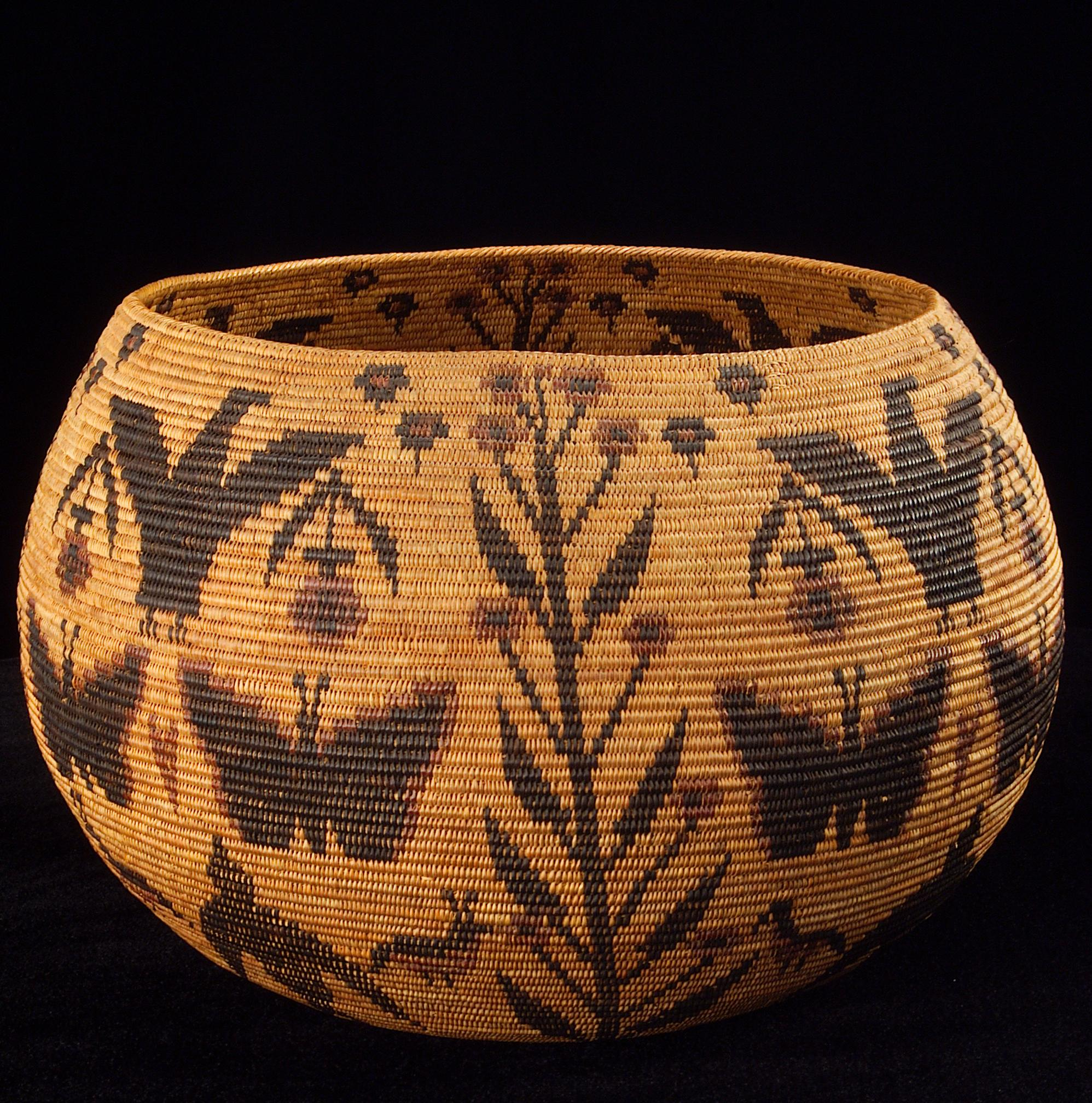
A basket woven by Miwok-Mono Paiute Native American artist Lucy Telles from the Yosemite Valley region

The Plains and Sierra Miwok lived by hunting and gathering, and lived in small local tribes, without centralized political authority. They are skilled at basketry and continue the traditions today.

=== Religion ===
The original Plains and Sierra Miwok people world view included Shamanism. One form this took was the Kuksu religion that was evident in Central and Northern California, which included elaborate acting and dancing ceremonies in traditional costume, an annual mourning ceremony, puberty rites of passage, shamanic intervention with the spirit world, and an all-male society that met in subterranean dance rooms. Kuksu was shared with other indigenous ethnic groups of Central California, such as the Pomo, Maidu, Ohlone, Esselen, and northernmost Yokuts. However, Kroeber observed less "specialized cosmogony" in the Miwok, which he termed one of the "southern Kuksu-dancing groups", in comparison to the Maidu and other northern California tribes.

=== Traditional narratives ===
The record of myths, legends, tales, and histories from the Plains and Sierra Miwok is one of the most extensive in the state. These groups participate in the general cultural pattern of Central California.

==== Mythology ====
Miwok mythology is similar to other natives of Central and Northern California. The Plains and Sierra Miwok believe in animal and human spirits, and see the animal spirits as their ancestors. Coyote is seen as their ancestor and creator god.

== Divisions ==
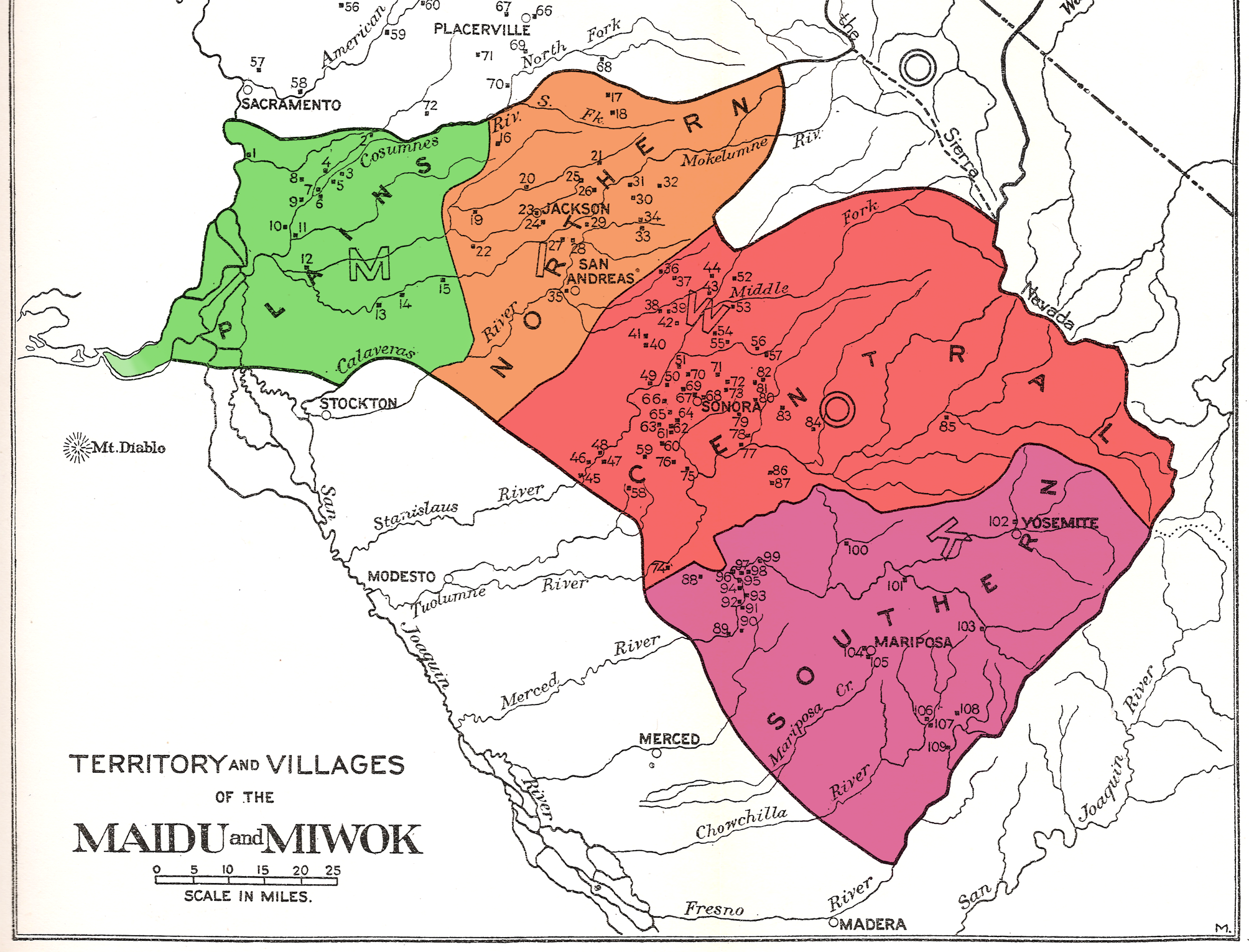
Map of the territory and villages (not exhaustive) of the Plains and Sierra Miwok (after Kroeber 1925).

There were four definite regional and linguistic sub-divisions: Plains Miwok, Northern Sierra Miwok, Central Sierra Miwok, and Southern Sierra Miwok.

=== Plains Miwok ===
The Plains Miwok inhabited a portion of the Central Valley's Sacramento-San Joaquin Delta and adjacent plains in modern southern Sacramento County, eastern Solano County, and northern San Joaquin County. They spoke Plains Miwok, a language of the Miwokan branch of the Utian language family.

==== Villages and local tribes ====
Classical anthropologists recorded a number of specific Plains Miwok villages, but it remained for work by Bennyhoff in the 1950s and 1960s to recognize multi-village territorial local tribes as the signature land-use organization of the Plains Miwok. The published specific village locations were:

- On the Cosumnes River: Chuyumkatat, Lulimal, Mayeman, Mokos-unni, Sukididi, Supu, Tukui, Yomit
- Near the Cosumnes River: Umucha, Yumhui; on the Mokelumne River: Lel-amni, Mokel(-unni), Sakayak-unni; on the east bank of Sacramento River below Sacramento: Hulpu-mni; on Jackson Creek: Ochech-ak

Among the important landholding local tribes at the time of Spanish colonization in California were:

- Anizumne at Rio Vista on the west side of the Sacramento River
- Chilamne at Bellota on the Calaveras River
- Chucumne at Liberty Island on the west side of the Sacramento River
- Cosomne at the Wilton Rancheria Miwok on the Cosumnes River
- Gualacomne at Freeport on both sides of the Sacramento River
- Guaypemne at Terminous on the Mokelumne River delta
- Lelamne at Clements on the Mokelumne River
- Muquelemne at Ione on the Mokelumne River
- Musupum at Andrus Island at the confluence of the Mokelumne and San Joaquin rivers
- Ochejamne at Courtland on the east side of the Sacramento River
- Quenemsia at Grand Island among the distributary channels of the Sacramento River
- Seuamne at Jenny Lind on the Calaveras River (intermediate to Northern Sierra Miwok)
- Sonolomne probably on Dry and Laguna creeks east of Galt
- Unizumne at Thornton at the confluence of the Cosumnes and Mokelumne rivers
- Ilamne at Yolano on the west side of the Sacramento River (northwest of Freeport)

==== Post-contact history ====
The majority of the members of the Plains Miwok local tribes moved to colonial Franciscan Mission San José, in some cases through attraction and in other cases through intimidation, between 1812 and 1833. By 1815 they represented 14% of the Indian people at that mission, and by 1830 they had reached 42% of the mission's population. In 1834 and 1835, hundreds of Plains Miwok survivors of the Central Valley's 1833 malaria epidemic were baptized at Mission San José. By the end of 1835, Plains Miwok was the native language of 60% of the Indian people at the mission.

Between 1834 and 1838 the Alta California missions were secularized (closed as religious and agricultural communes). Many Plains Miwoks moved back to their home areas, where between 1839 and 1841 John Sutter played the local groups off against one another in order to gain control of the lower Sacramento Valley. Other Plains Miwok families remained in the San Francisco Bay area, intermarried with Ohlone, Patwin, and Yokuts peoples, and found work on local Mexican ranchos.

=== Northern Sierra Miwok ===
The Northern Miwok inhabited the upper watersheds of the Mokelumne River and the Calaveras River. One settlement site is within the present day Indian Grinding Rock State Historic Park near Volcano. They spoke Northern Sierra Miwok, a language in the Utian linguistic group.

==== Historic villages ====
The authenticated Northern Sierra Miwok villages are:

- At present-day San Andreas: Huta-sil
- At present-day Jackson: Tukupe-su
- Near present-day Jackson: Pola-su
- On the Calaveras River Headwaters: Kechenti, Kaitimii, Mona-sti
- Between Calaveras River and Mokelumne Rivers: Apautawilti, Heina, Ketina
- On the Cosumnes River: Noma (South Fork), Omo (South Fork), Yule (south of river)
- On the Mokelumne River. Ktiniisti, Uptistini, Penken-sii (inland south of river), Sopochi (towards Jackson Creek)
- On Jackson Creek: Chakane-sii?, Seweu-sii, Tumuti (on the headwaters), Yuloni, on Jackson Creek

=== Central Sierra Miwok ===
The Central Sierra Miwok inhabited the upper watersheds of the Stanislaus River and the Tuolumne River. They spoke Central Sierra Miwok, a language in the Utian linguistic group.

==== Historic villages ====
The authenticated Central Sierra Miwok villages are:

- At present-day Sonora: Akankau-nchi (1), Kuluti. Also in this vicinity: Hunga, Kapanina, Chakachi-no, Akankau-nchi (2), Kesa, Kotoplana, Olaw_ye, Pokto-no, Pota, Siksike-no, Sopka-su, Suchumumu, Sukanola, Sukwela, Telese-no, Tel'ula, Tunuk-chi, Waka-che.
- On the Calaveras River: Humata, Katuka, Newichu (between Stanislaus River and a head branch)
- On the Stanislaus River: Akutanuka (northwest), Hangwite (South Fork), Kawinucha (North Fork), Kewe-no, Loyowisa (near the junction of Middle and South Forks), Oloikoto, Sutamasina (South Fork), Takema (Middle Fork), Tipotoya, Tulana-chi, Tulsuna (between the South and Middle Forks), Tuyiwu-nu, Wokachet (South Fork), Wolanga-su (south of the junction between the South and Middle Forks), Wtiyu Yungakatok (near the junction of the North and Middle Forks)
- On the Tuolumne River: Akawila (between a branch of Tuolumne and Stanislaus rivers), Hechhechi (at headwaters), Hochhochmeti, Kulamu, Pangasema-nu (northern), Pasi-nu (southeast of Sonora), Pigliku (southern), Singawu-nu, Sala
- Near present-day San Andreas: Alakani (east), Kosoimuno-nu (towards Stanislaus River), Sasamu (almost due east), Shulaputi (southeast)

=== Southern Sierra Miwok ===
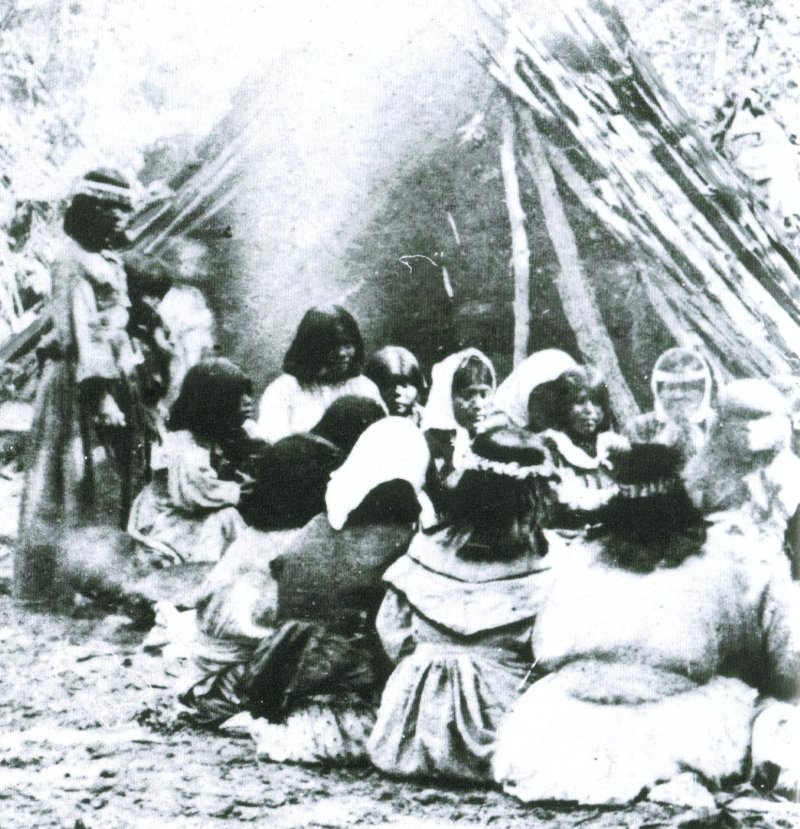
Miwok-Paiute ceremony in 1872 at current site of Yosemite Lodge in Yosemite Valley

The Southern Miwok inhabited the lower banks of the Merced River and the Chowchilla River, as well as Mariposa Creek. They spoke Southern Sierra Miwok, a language in the Utian linguistic group.

The Merced River flows from the High Sierras, through Yosemite Valley, and into the San Joaquin Valley near present-day near Livingston.

The Mono tribe people (considered Northern Paiute) occupied the higher eastern Sierras and the Mono Lake Basin, and entered Yosemite from the east. The Mono name for the Southern Miwok was qohsoo?moho. Miwoks occupied the lower western foothills of the Sierras and entered from the west. Disputes between the two tribes were violent, and the residents of the valley, in defense of their territory, were considered to be among the most aggressive of any tribes in the area.

When encountered by immigrants of European descent, the neighboring Southern Sierra Miwok tribe referred to the Yosemite Valley residents as "killers". It is from this reference and a confusion over the word for "grizzly bear" that Bunnell named the valley Yosemite. The native residents called the valley awahni. Today, there is some debate about the original meaning of the word, since the Southern Miwok language is virtually extinct, but recent Southern Miwok speakers defined it as "place like a gaping mouth." Those living in awahni were known as the Awahnichi (also spelled Awani, Ahwahnechee, and similar variants), meaning "people who live in awahni". The naming of the Ahwahnee Hotel was derived from the Miwok word.

==== Historic villages ====
The authenticated Southern Sierra Miwok villages are:

- Near present-day Mariposa: Kasumati, Nochu-chi
- On the Chowchilla River headwaters: Nowach, Olwia
- On the Fresno River: Wasema, Wehilto
- On the Merced River: Alaula-chi, Angisawepa, Awal, Hikena, Kakahula-chi, Kitiwana, Kuyuka-chi, Owelinhatihu, Palachan, Sayangasi, Siso-chi, Sope-nchi, Sotpok, WilitoYawoka-chi

==== Post-contact history ====
After Euro-Americans entered Yosemite Valley and the adjacent Sierras, and established Yosemite National Park, the residents were of both Paiute-Mono and Miwok origin. They had either fought to a stalemate or agreed to peaceful coexistence and had intermixed to a limited extent.

== Population ==
Alfred L. Kroeber estimated there to be 9,000 Plains and Sierra Miwok combined in 1770, but this is an arguably low estimate. Richard Levy estimated there were 17,800. In 1848 their population was estimated at 6,000, in 1852 at 4,500, in 1880 at 100, and in 1910 the population was estimated at 670.

=== Notable Plains and Sierra Miwoks ===
- Lucy Telles — master basket weaver, based in Yosemite Valley.
- Tenaya — leader of the Ahwahnechee in Yosemite Valley

== Notes ==
=== References ===
- Anderson, Daniel. Origin of the word Yosemite. Retrieved on 2006-08-01.
- Broadbent, Sylvia. (1964). The Southern Sierra Miwok Language. University of California publications in linguistics. Vol. 38. Berkeley, CA: University of California Press.
- Bennyhoff, James A. 1977. Ethnogeography of the Plains Miwok. Center for Archaeological Research at Davis Publication Number 5. University of California at Davis.
- Bunnell, Dr. Lafayette. Discovery of the Yosemite, and the Indian war of 1851, which led to that event, 3d ed. New York City and Chicago, IL: F. H. Revell Company, 1892.
- Callaghan, Catherine A. 1984. Plains Miwok Dictionary. University of California Publications in Linguistics, Volume 105.
- Cook, Sherburne. The Conflict Between the California Indian and White Civilization. Berkeley and Los Angeles, CA: University of California Press, 1976. ISBN 0-520-03143-1.
- Kroeber, Alfred L. 1907. The Religion of the Indians of California, University of California Publications in American Archaeology and Ethnology 4:#6. Berkeley, sections titled "Shamanism", "Public Ceremonies", "Ceremonial Structures and Paraphernalia", and "Mythology and Beliefs"; available at Sacred Texts Online
- Kroeber, Alfred L. 1925. Handbook of the Indians of California. Washington, D.C: Bureau of American Ethnology Bulletin No. 78. (Chapter 30, The Miwok); available at Yosemite Online Library.
- Levy, Richard. 1978. Eastern Miwok, in Handbook of North American Indians, vol. 8 (California). William C. Sturtevant, and Robert F. Heizer, eds. Washington, DC: Smithsonian Institution, 1978. ISBN 0-16-004578-9 / 0160045754, pp. 398–413.
- Milliken, Randall. 2008. Native Americans at Mission San Jose. Banning, CA: Malki-Ballena Press. ISBN 978-0-87919-147-4
- Mithun, Marianne. 1999. The Languages of Native North America. University Press, Cambridge.
