= Northern Sierra Miwok =

Extinct Miwok language of California, US

- Saclan
- Native to: United States
- Region: California
- Ethnicity: Sierra Miwok
- Extinct: 1990s
- Language family: Yok-Utian: Utian; Miwokan; Eastern; Sierra Miwok; Northern Sierra Miwok

Language codes
- ISO 639-3: nsq
- Glottolog: nort2968
- ELP: Sierra Miwok (shared)

Northern Sierra Miwok is a Miwok language spoken in California, in the upper Mokelumne and Calaveras valleys. Northern Sierra Miwok is one of roughly 7 languages belonging to the Miwok family, which are hypothesized to belong to Penutian. Northern Sierra Miwok was spoken South to the Cosumnes River and West to Ione. It is estimated that there were 19,500 speakers before European contact of the Miwok languages (Saclan, Plains, Central, Lake, Southern, and Northern Sierra Miwok).

== Phonology ==
Consonants
		Bilabial	Dental	Alveolar	Post- alveolar	Palatal	Velar	Glottal
Plosive	plain	p	t̪ ⟨t⟩	t ⟨ṭ⟩	tʃ ⟨č⟩		k	ʔ
Plosive	voiced	b (Note: taken from loan words)		d				
Nasal		m		n			ŋ	
Fricative		f		s	ʃ ⟨š⟩			h
Trill				r				
Approximant		w		l		j ⟨y⟩		

Vowels
	Front		Central		Back	
	short	long	short	long	short	long
Close	i	iː	ɨ	ɨː	u	uː
Mid	e	eː	ə (Note: taken from loan words)		o	oː
Open			a	aː		

=== Spanish Influence ===
The establishment of Franciscan Missions led to the language of Northern Sierra Miwok being influenced by Spanish either via direct loan words or morphological changes. This is especially well studied in the Fiddletown dialect.

== Revitalization and Current Status ==
Less than a dozen speakers were alive in the 21st century. There is interest in language revitalization of the Miwok languages, a 2015 All Miwok Language conference hosted by the Tuolumne Band of Me-Wuk Indians aimed to gather those interested in the languages.
