= Bay Miwok language =

Moribund Miwok language of California

Bay Miwok
- Saclan
- Native to: United States
- Region: California
- Ethnicity: Bay Miwok
- Era: attested 1821
- Language family: Yok-Utian: Utian; Miwokan; Eastern; Bay Miwok

Language codes
- ISO 639-3: mkq
- Glottolog: baym1241

Bay Miwok (Saclan, Saklan) was one of the Miwok languages spoken in California, around San Francisco Bay. All of the population has shifted to English.
