= Central Sierra Miwok =

Miwok language of California, US

- Saclan
- Native to: United States
- Region: California
- Ethnicity: Sierra Miwok
- Native speakers: (12 all Miwok cited 1994)
- Language family: Yok-Utian: Utian; Miwokan; Eastern; Sierra Miwok; Central Sierra Miwok

Language codes
- ISO 639-3: csm
- Glottolog: cent2140
- ELP: Sierra Miwok (shared)
- Central Sierra Miwok is classified as Critically Endangered by the UNESCO Atlas of the World's Languages in Danger.

Central Sierra Miwok is a Miwok language spoken in California, in the upper Stanislaus and Tuolumne valleys. Today it is spoken by the Chicken Ranch Rancheria of Me-Wuk Indians of California, a federally recognized tribe of Central Sierra Miwoks. As of 2012, an active revitalization program is underway in the Tuolumne Band of Me-Wuk Indians.

== Phonology ==
With the orthography of the 1960 dictionary, the sounds of Central Sierra Miwok are,

Consonants
	Bilabial	Dental	Alveolar	Post- alveolar	Palatal	Velar	Glottal
Nasal	m		n			ŋ ⟨ŋ⟩	
Plosive	p	t̪ ⟨t⟩	t ⟨ṭ⟩	tʃ ⟨č⟩		k	ʔ ⟨ʔ⟩
Fricative			s	ʃ ⟨š⟩			h
Approximant	w		l		j ⟨j⟩		

Vowels
	Front	Central	Back
Close	i	ɨ ⟨y⟩	u
Mid	e		o
Open		a	

In later transcription, /j/ was written ⟨y⟩ and /ɨ/ ⟨ï⟩. Long vowels are written ⟨aꞏ⟩ etc.
