= Miwok =

Indigenous peoples of California

- Historical distribution of Miwok peoples in California

Total population
- 1770: over 11,000; 1910: 670; 1930: 491; 2000: 3,500

Regions with significant populations
- California: Sierra Nevada Mountains, Central Valley, Marin County, Sonoma County, Lake County, Contra Costa County

Languages
- Miwok languages

Religion
- Shamanism: Kuksu; Miwok mythology

Related ethnic groups
- Subgroups: Plains & Sierra Miwok; Coast Miwok; Lake Miwok; Bay Miwok

The Miwok are four linguistically related Indigenous peoples of California. Their homelands are in Northern California and Central California. Their lands were in the Sacramento Valley, the foothills of the Sierra Nevadas, and the San Francisco Bay Area.

Historically, they spoke Miwok languages, part of the Utian family.

== Name ==
The word Miwok means people in the Miwok languages. Miwok is also spelled Miwuk, Mi-Wuk, or Me-Wuk.

== Subgroups ==
Anthropologists commonly divide the Miwok into four geographically and culturally diverse ethnic subgroups. These distinctions were not used among the Miwok before European contact.

- Plains and Sierra Miwok: from the western slope and foothills of the Sierra Nevada, the Sacramento Valley, San Joaquin Valley and the Sacramento-San Joaquin Delta
- Coast Miwok: from present-day location of Marin County and southern Sonoma County (includes the Bodega Bay Miwok and Marin Miwok)
- Lake Miwok: from Clear Lake basin of Lake County
- Bay Miwok: from present-day location of Contra Costa County

== Federally recognized tribes ==
The United States Bureau of Indian Affairs officially recognizes eleven tribes of Miwok descent in California. They are as follows:

- Buena Vista Rancheria of Me-Wuk Indians of California
- California Valley Miwok Tribe, formerly known as the Sheep Ranch Rancheria of Me-Wuk Indians
- Chicken Ranch Rancheria of Me-Wuk Indians
- Federated Indians of Graton Rancheria, formerly known as the Federated Coast Miwok
- Ione Band of Miwok Indians of California
- Jackson Band of Miwuk Indians, previously known as Jackson Rancheria of Me-Wuk Indians of California
- Middletown Rancheria of Pomo Indians of California, (citizens of this tribe are of Pomo, Lake Miwok, and Wintun descent)
- Shingle Springs Band of Miwok Indians, Shingle Springs Rancheria (Verona Tract)
- Tuolumne Band of Me-Wuk Indians of the Tuolumne Rancheria of California
- United Auburn Indian Community of Auburn Rancheria of California
- Wilton Rancheria

=== Non-federally recognized tribes ===
- Miwok Tribe of the El Dorado Rancheria
- Nashville-Eldorado Miwok Tribe
- Colfax-Todds Valley Consolidated Tribe of the Colfax Rancheria
- Southern Sierra Miwuk Nation
- Calaveras Band of Mi-Wuk Indians
- Miwok of Buena Vista Rancheria
- River Valley Miwok Indians, formally known as Historical Families of Wilton Rancheria

== History ==
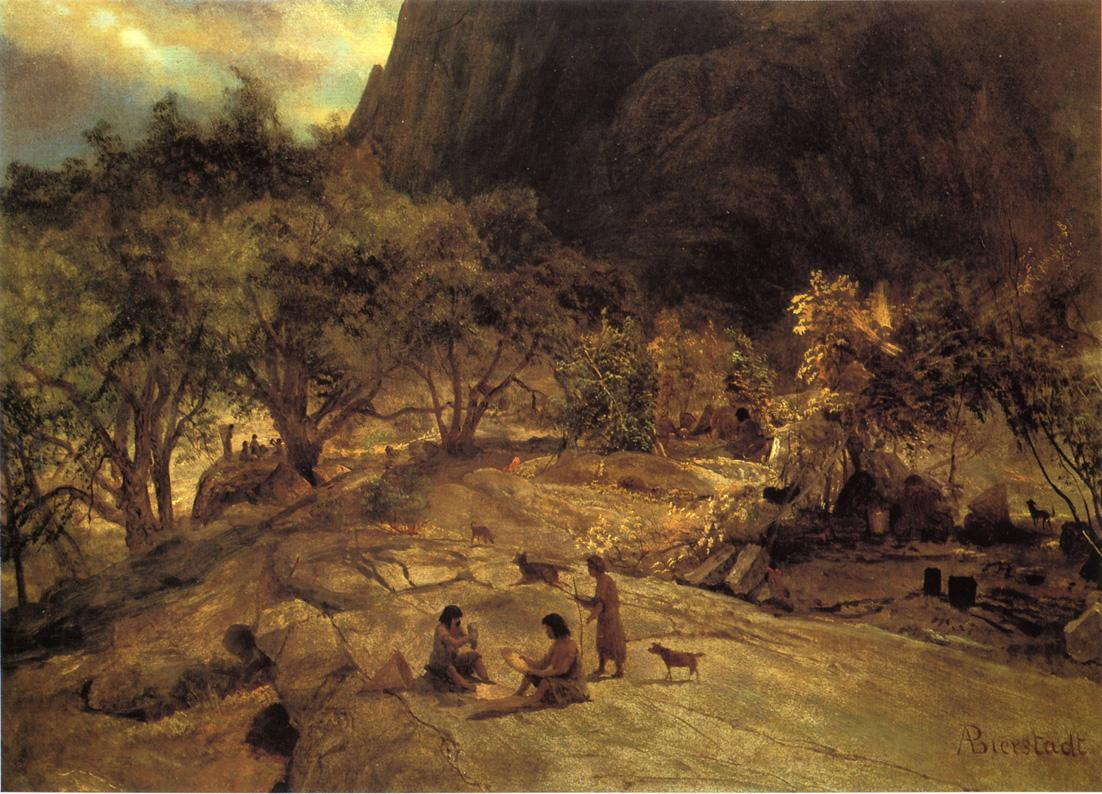
Painting of Sierra Miwok at the Mariposa Indian Encampment, Yosemite Valley by Albert Bierstadt

The predominant theory regarding the settlement of the Americas dates the original migrations from Asia to around 20,000 years ago across the Bering Strait land bridge, but anthropologist Otto von Sadovszky claims that the Miwok and some other northern California tribes descend from Siberians who arrived in California by sea around 3,000 years ago.

== Culture ==
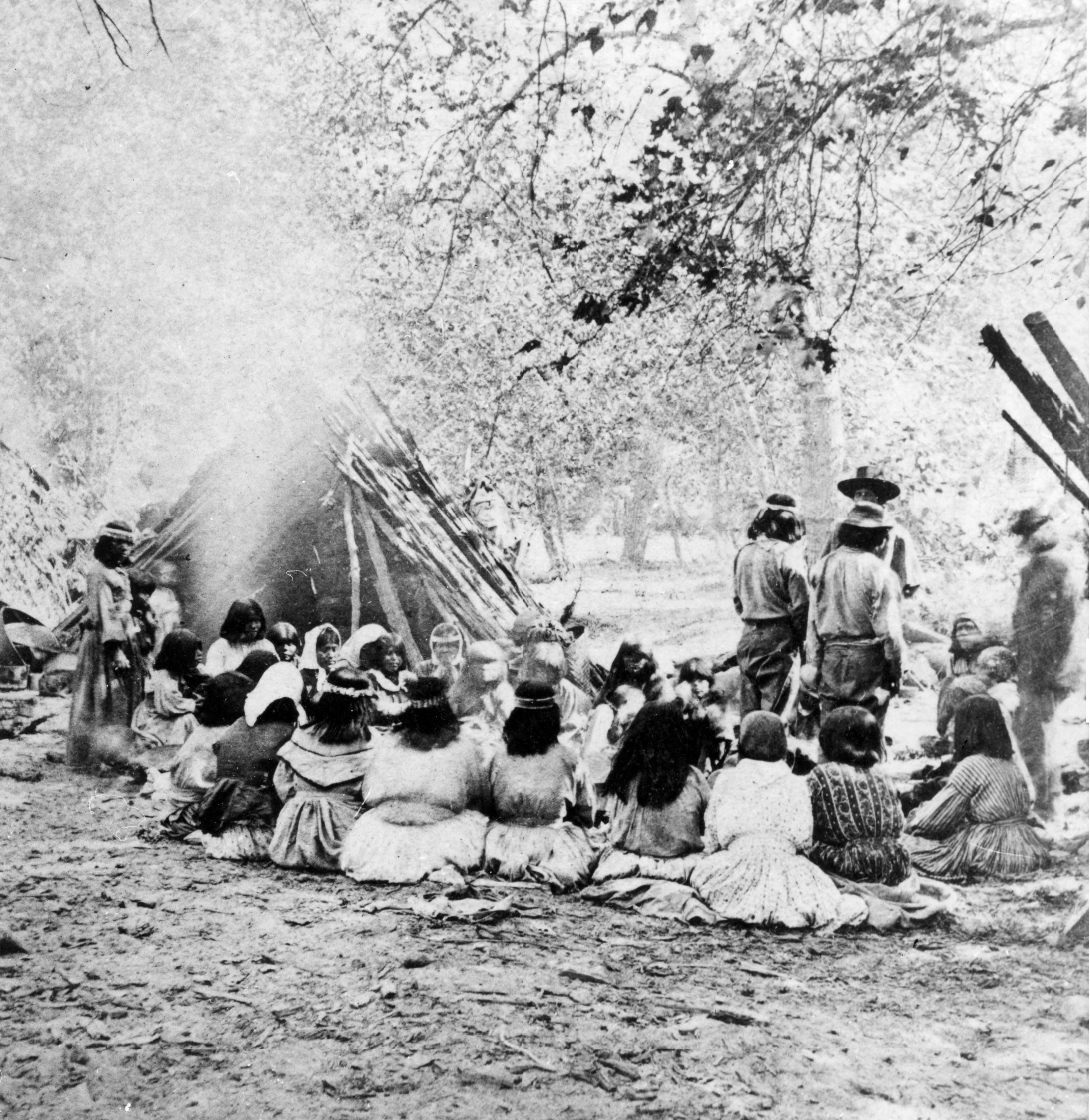
1872 photograph of Southern Miwok council in Yosemite Valley

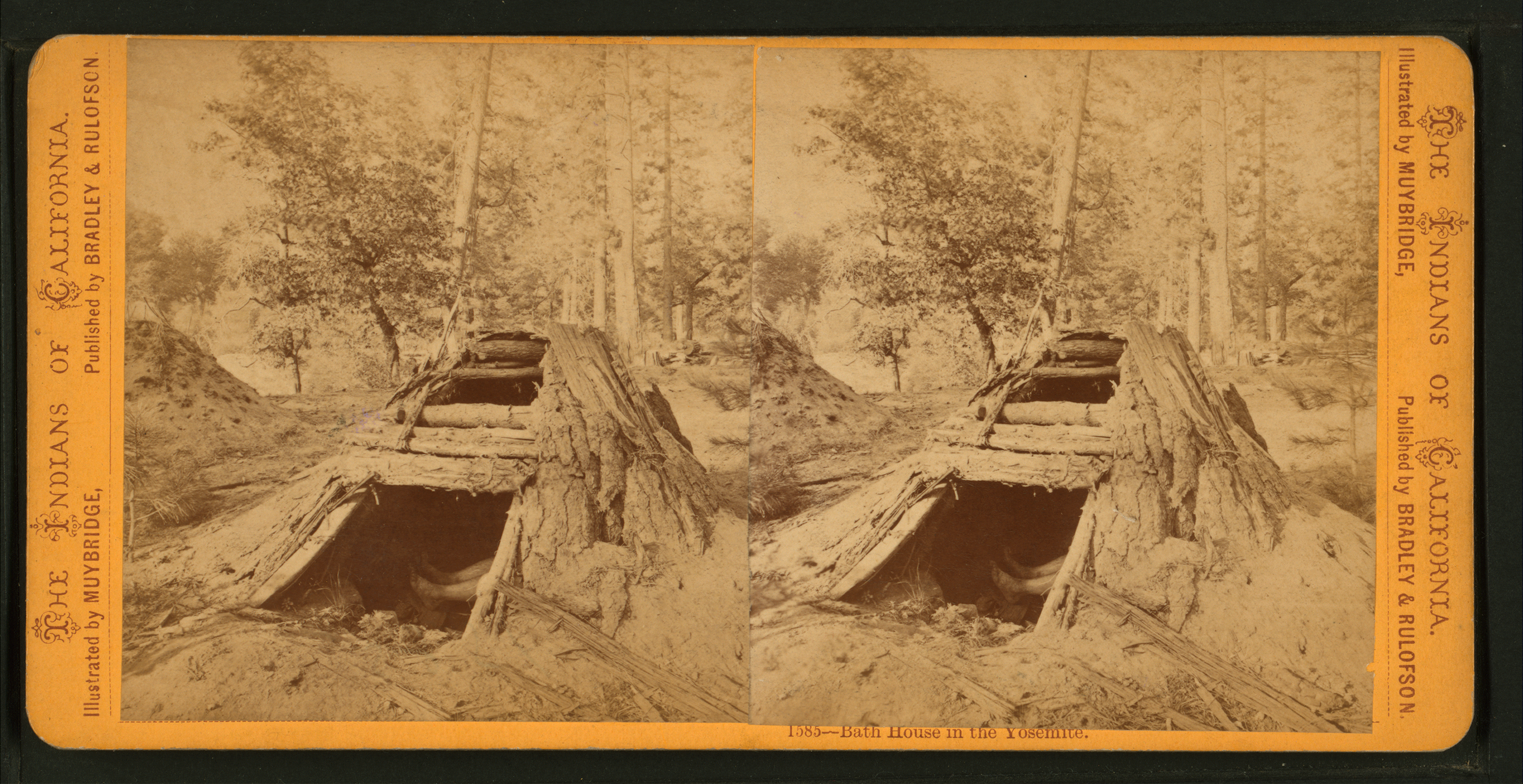
Miwok sweat lodge in Yosemite Valley

The Miwok lived in small bands without centralized political authority before contact with European Americans in 1769. They had domesticated dogs and cultivated tobacco, but were otherwise complex hunter-gatherers.

=== Cuisine ===
The Sierra Miwok harvested acorns from the California Black Oak. In fact, the modern-day extent of the California Black Oak forests in some areas of Yosemite National Park is partially due to cultivation by Miwok tribes. They burned understory vegetation to reduce the fraction of Ponderosa Pine. Nearly every other kind of edible vegetable matter was used as a food source, including bulbs, seeds, and fungi. Animals were hunted with arrows, clubs or snares, depending on the species and the situation. Grasshoppers were a highly prized food source, as were mussels for those groups adjacent to the Stanislaus River. Coastal Miwok were known to have predominantly relied on food gathered from the inland side of the Marin peninsula (modern San Pablo bay, lakes, and land based foods), but to have also engaged in diving for abalone in the Pacific Ocean.

The Miwok ate meals according to appetite rather than at regular times. They stored food for later consumption, primarily in flat-bottomed baskets.

=== Environmental Interaction ===
The Miwok, like many other tribes at the time, worked with their environment to sustain themselves and also to sustain the lands around them. For example, the Coast Miwok fished and hunted sustainably, keeping the coastal waters and the land healthy. They did not hunt for more than they needed. The Miwok also burned the grasslands after a harvest, encouraging new plants to grow from the ashes. These burnings, called "cultural burns" or "prescribed burns" today, were important for their environment. It would clear away the old brush and trees to make room for new saplings to grow. Some plants, known as pyrophytes, require smoke or high temperatures to grow, which lets them thrive under the fire. Animals would benefit from this too, as the fire would burn cavities into the trees that they could use as a habitat.

=== Religion ===
The Miwok creation story and narratives tend to be similar to those of other natives of Northern California. One of their sacred places is Mount Diablo. This is where they believe the animal creation god, Coyote, created them and all of their resources. Miwok had totem animals, identified with one of two moieties, which were in turn associated respectively with land and water. These totem animals were not thought of as literal ancestors of humans, but rather as predecessors.

=== Sports ===
Miwok people played mixed-gender games, with both men and women in each team, on a 110-yard (100 m) playing field called poscoi a we'a. Similarly to soccer, the object of the game was to kick or carry an elk hide ball to the opposing team's goalpost, but the rules varied by gender. Women could handle the ball in any way they chose, using any part of their bodies to control it, including kicking the ball or picking it up and running with it. In contrast, men were only allowed to kick the ball. However, a man could pick up a woman who was holding the ball and run to the goal with her.

== Population ==
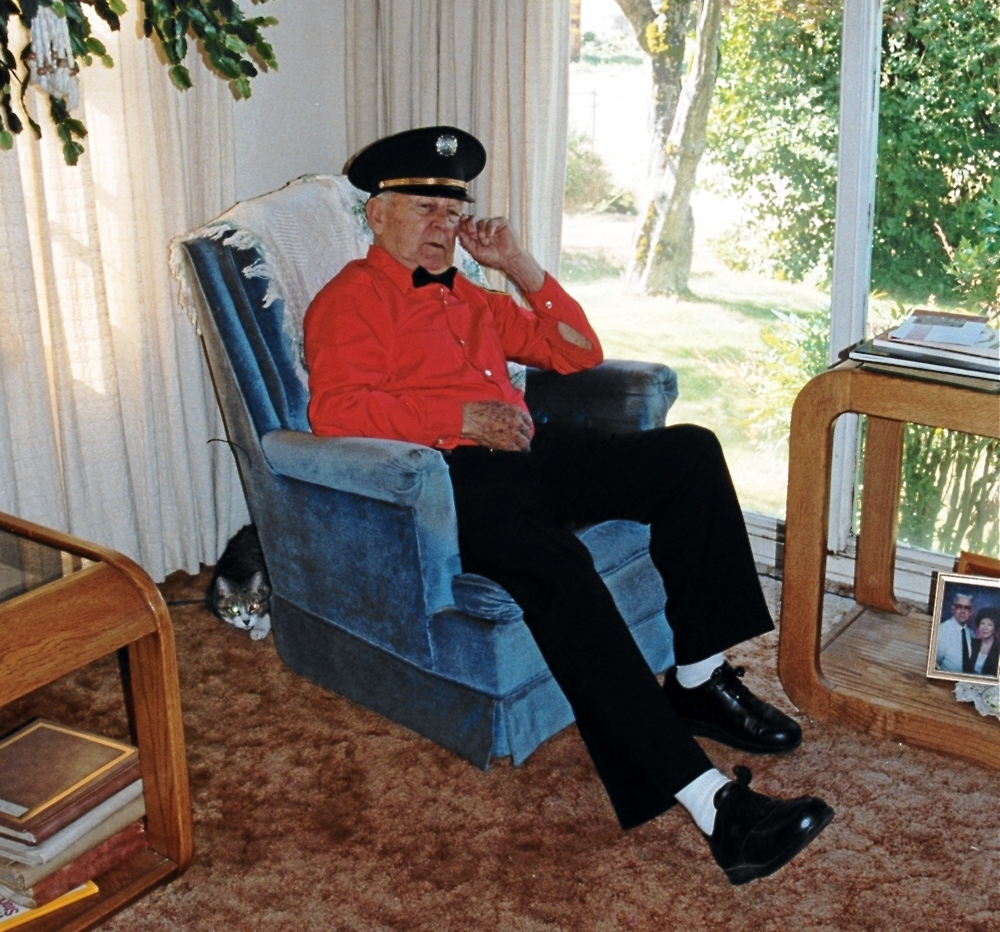
Benjamin Barry (Miwok), World War II veteran and fire chief, in parade dress

In 1770, there were an estimated 500 Lake Miwok, 1,500 Coast Miwok, and 9,000 Plains and Sierra Miwok, totaling about 11,000 people, according to historian Alfred L. Kroeber, although this may be an undercount; for example, he did not identify the Bay Miwok.

California historians estimate the Miwok population was at least 25,000 in 1769.

The 1910 Census reported a total of 671 Miwok, while the 1930 Census noted 491. See history of each Miwok group for more information. By the 2000 Census, the total number of Miwok had risen to approximately 3,500.

== Influences on popular culture ==
The Star Wars films feature a fictional species of forest-dwelling creatures known as Ewoks, who are ostensibly named after the Miwok.

The Miwok people are encountered in Kim Stanley Robinson's book The Years of Rice and Salt. In an alternate history scenario depicted in the book, they are the first group of Native Americans encountered by the first Chinese to discover the continent.

== See also ==
- Kule Loklo
- Saklan
- Lucy Shepard Freeland
- Lucy Telles
- Utian languages
