= California Rancheria Termination Acts =

The California Rancheria Termination Acts refer to three acts of Congress and an amendment passed in the 1950s and 1960s as part of the US Indian termination policy. The three Acts, passed in 1956, 1957, and 1958 targeted 41 rancherías for termination. An additional seven were added via an amendment in 1964. Including three previous terminations, 46 of the 51 targeted rancherias were successfully terminated. Through litigation and legislation, over 30 rancherias have been restored and at least five are still working to be.

== Terminations prior to 1958 ==
The first termination occurred on 29 March 1956 for the Koi Nation of the Lower Lake Rancheria in two laws, Public Law 443 [H. R. 585] 70 Stat. 58 and Public Law 751 [H. R. 11163] 70 Stat. 595 which amended the description of the property. Lake County purchased the Lower Lake Rancheria property to build an airport and the tribal position was that though they were landless, they had not been officially terminated. Indian Health program records, however, show that the tribe was officially terminated as of 29 March 1956 and no tribal members were eligible for services. After years of attempting to have their status reaffirmed, the Bureau of Indian Affairs "citing oversights in official records", recognized the tribe on 29 December 2000.

The second termination occurred on 10 July 1957 when the Coyote Valley Band of Pomo Indians was displaced with passage of Public Law 85-91 71 Stat. 283 authorizing the sale of the Coyote Valley Rancheria by the Secretary of the Interior to the Secretary of the Army for the Russian River Basin project to build the Coyote Valley Dam. Though this band was relocated a few miles away to the Coyote Valley Reservation, records of the Indian Health program show that it was terminated and all tribal members were ineligible for further services as of 10 July 1957. Like the Koi Nation, this may have been a recording error, as the tribe is a federally recognized entity.

One final rancheria appears to have been terminated prior to the 1958 Act. According to the Indian Health program records, Laguna Rancheria was terminated effective 4 February 1958.

== California Rancheria Termination Act of 1958 ==
On 18 August 1958, Congress passed the California Rancheria Termination Act, Public Law 85-671 (72 Stat. 619). The act called for the distribution of all 41 rancheria communal lands and assets to individual tribe members. It called for a plan "for distributing to individual Indians the assets of the reservation or rancheria, including the assigned and the unassigned lands, or for selling such assets and distributing the proceeds of sale, or conveying such assets to a corporation or other legal entity organized or designed by the group, or for conveying such assets to the group, as tenants in common." Before the land could be distributed, the act called for a government survey of land on the rancheria. The government was required to improve or construct all roads serving the rancheria, to install or rehabilitate irrigation, sanitation, and domestic water systems, and to exchange land held in trust for the rancheria. All Indians who received a portion of the assets were ineligible to receive any more federal services rendered to them based on their status as Indians.

In 1957–58, a State Senate Interim Committee investigation revealed that little had been done to prepare Indian reserves for termination. In 1958, the Rancheria Termination Act was enacted. A memo from the Department of Interior shows the insufficiency of the notice given the California Indians, which was simply posted on the rancheria for 30 days. In many testimonies, like that of the Nisenan of the Nevada City Rancheria, plaintiffs alleged that BIA officials spoke only to whoever was occupying the homestead at the time, rather than consulting with Indians living in the surrounding area.

== 1964 Amendment ==
In 1964, an amendment to the California Rancheria Termination Act (78 Stat. 390) was enacted, terminating additional rancheria lands. Overall, then, there were 3 rancherias terminated prior to Public Law 85-671, 41 mentioned in Public Law 85-671, an additional 7 included in the amendment of 1964 and 5 that were never terminated but were listed, correcting the number of California Rancherias terminated from the oft-cited 41 to 46 total terminations. The Bureau of Indian Affairs states that while 41 Rancherias were slated for termination ultimately only 38 were terminated under the Rancheria Act, the source of this discrepancy is unknown.

== Restoration ==
Many tribes expressed dissatisfaction with termination immediately. Federal failures to live up to promised improvements and educational opportunities that were supposed to be part of an agreement to accept termination led eventually to lawsuits calling to reverse terminations.

The first successful challenge was for the Robinson Rancheria which was 22 March 1977 and it was followed by 5 others: the Hopland Rancheria was restored 29 March 1978; The Upper Lake Rancheria was restored 15 May 1979; the Table Bluff Rancheria was restored 21 September 1981; the Big Sandy Rancheria was restored 28 March 1983; and the Table Mountain Rancheria was restored in June, 1983. Each of these decisions only pertained to one reservation.

The success of these suits and frustration with unmet promises, caused Tillie Hardwick in 1979 to consult with California Indian Legal Services, who decided to make a class action case. On 19 July 1983 a U.S.District Court in Tillie Hardwick, et al. v. United States of America, et al. Case #C-79-1710-SW ordered federal recognition of 17 of California's Rancherias. The Hardwick decision restored more terminated tribes than any other single case in California and prompted the majority of the terminated rancherias to pursue federal restoration.

Of the 46 terminated rancherias 27 have been restored, one (Coyote Valley) didn't need restoration because it is currently recognized, and at least five rancherias are still trying to restore their federal status.

== Lists of California Rancherias ==
California Rancherias Terminated prior to 1958
| | Rancheria or Reservation | Tribal entity | Date of termination | Date of Reinstatement | Date of Land Restoration | Details |
|---|---|---|---|---|---|---|
| 1. | Lower Lake Rancheria | Koi Nation of Northern California | March 29, 1956 | December 29, 2000 | | Terminated by Public Law 443 [H. R. 585] 70 Stat. 58[2] and Public Law 751 [H. R. 11163] 70 Stat. 595. |
| 2. | Caoyote Valley Rancheria | Coyote Valley Band of Pomo Indians of California | July 10, 1957 | | | Terminated by Public Law 85-91 71 Stat. 283. |
| 3. | Laguna Rancheria | | February 4, 1958 | | 1977 | |

California Rancherias Terminated by Act of 1958
| | Rancheria or Reservation | Tribal entity | Date of termination | Date of Reinstatement | Date of Land Restoration | Details |
|---|---|---|---|---|---|---|
| 1. | Alexander Valley Rancheria | Mishewal Wappo Indians of Alexander Valley | August 1, 1961 | | | In 2009, the tribe filed for federal restoration. On 25 July 2013 a hearing was held in San Jose, California in the federal court of U.S. District Court Judge Edward Davila. The claim was denied citing that the statute of limitations was exceeded. |
| 2. | Auburn Rancheria | United Auburn Indian Community | August 18, 1967 | October 31, 1994 | October 31, 1994 | By federal statute. Public Law No. 103-434, 108 Stat. 4533 With the passage of their restoration law, 49.21 acres (19.91 ha) were restored to the tribal trust. |
| 3. | Big Sandy Rancheria | Big Sandy Rancheria of Mono Indians | August 18, 1958 | March 28, 1983 | March 28, 1983 | By US Federal Court decision San Joaquin or Big Sandy Band of Indians, et al. v. James Watt, et al. Civil Case #C-80-3787-MHP |
| 4. | Big Valley Rancheria | Big Valley Band of Pomo Indians | November 11, 1965 | December 22, 1983 | December 22, 1983 | By US Federal Court decision Tillie Hardwick, et al. v. United States of America, et al. Case #C-79-1710-SW At the time of the Hardwick I decision 99.52 acres (40.27 ha) of land were restored to the tribal trust. |
| 5. | Blue Lake Rancheria | Blue Lake Rancheria of the Wiyot, Yurok, and Hupa Indians | September 22, 1966 | December 22, 1983 | December 22, 1983 | By US Federal Court decision Tillie Hardwick, et al. v. United States of America, et al. Case #C-79-1710-SW At the time of the Hardwick I decision 19.40 acres (7.85 ha) were restored to the tribal trust. |
| 6. | Buena Vista Rancheria | Buena Vista Rancheria of Me-Wuk Indians of California | April 11, 1961 | December 22, 1983 | | By US Federal Court decision Tillie Hardwick, et al. v. United States of America, et al. Case #C-79-1710-SW |
| 7. | Cache Creek Rancheria | Unknown | April 11, 1961 | | | Remains terminated as of 1997 Note: The Cache Creek Casino Resort is run by the Yocha Dehe Wintun Nation. |
| 8. | Chicken Ranch Rancheria | Chicken Ranch Rancheria of Me-Wuk Indians of California | August 1, 1961 | December 22, 1983 | December 22, 1983 | By US Federal Court decision Tillie Hardwick, et al. v. United States of America, et al. Case #C-79-1710-SW At the time of the Hardwick I decision 50.58 acres (20.47 ha) were restored to the tribal trust. |
| 9. | Chico Rancheria | Mechoopda Indian Tribe of Chico Rancheria, California | June 2, 1967 | May 4, 1992 | January 24, 2014 | Federal decree: 57 Fed. Reg. 19,133 (May 4, 1992). Partial restoration of lands was granted in the final settlement of a US Federal Court decision Scotts Valley v. United States (Final Judgment), No. C-86-3660-VRW (N.D. Cal. April 17, 1992), but they were unable to reestablish the former rancheria boundaries. The tribe's former reservation is within the City of Chico and zoned for residential and commercial use, with a part of it being California State University property. On 20 March 20, 2000, the formally requested the State of California to negotiate with the tribe for class III gaming facilities. The stated declined as the tribe has no lands. In 2003 the tribe filed suit in Mechoopda Indian Tribe of Chico Rancheria, California v. Arnold Schwarzenegger and the State of California, Civ. S-03-2327WBS/GGH, but the case was dismissed on 12 March 2004. A decade later, the federal government authorized the tribe to restore their lands under the "restored lands exception" of the Indian Reorganization Act. |
| 10. | Cloverdale Rancheria | Cloverdale Rancheria of Pomo Indians of California | December 30, 1965 | December 22, 1983 | December 22, 1983 | By US Federal Court decision Tillie Hardwick, et al. v. United States of America, et al. Case #C-79-1710-SW At the time of the Hardwick I decision 12.56 acres (5.08 ha) were restored to the tribal trust. |
| 11. | Cold Springs Rancheria | Cold Springs Rancheria of Mono Indians of California | —N/a | —N/a | —N/a | The ACCIP Termination Report: The Continuing Destructive Effects of the Termination Policy on California Indians, prepared by the Advisory Council on California Indian Policy in September, 1997 states that the Cold Springs Rancheria was never terminated |
| 12. | Elk Valley Rancheria | Elk Valley Rancheria, California | July 16, 1966 | December 22, 1983 | December 22, 1983 | By US Federal Court decision Tillie Hardwick, et al. v. United States of America, et al. Case #C-79-1710-SW At the time of the Hardwick I decision 215.44 acres (87.19 ha) were restored to the tribal trust. |
| 13. | Graton Rancheria | Federated Indians of Graton Rancheria, California | February 18, 1966 | 1992 | December 27, 2000 | On 2 March 1999 legislation was introduced to restore the tribal lands of the tribe. The legislation was passed the US Congress and signed by President Clinton on December 27, 2000. |
| 14. | Greenville Rancheria | Greenville Rancheria of Maidu Indians | December 8, 1966 | December 22, 1983 | December 22, 1983 | By US Federal Court decision Tillie Hardwick, et al. v. United States of America, et al. Case #C-79-1710-SW At the time of the Hardwick I decision 1.8 acres (0.73 ha) of land were restored to the tribal trust. |
| 15. | Guidiville Rancheria | Guidiville Rancheria of California | September 3, 1965 | 1986 | March 15, 1991 | By US Federal Court decision Scotts Valley Band of Pomo Indians of the Sugar Bowl Rancheria, et al. v. United States of America, et al., No. C-86-3660-WWS Shortly after the Scotts Valley decision 46.88 acres (18.97 ha) were restored to the tribal trust. |
| 16. | Hopland Rancheria | Hopland Band of Pomo Indians, California | June 18, 1961 | March 29, 1978 | March 29, 1978 | By US Federal Court decision Roger Smith, as Administrator of the Estate of Ellerick Smith, et al. v. United States of America, et al. Case #C-74-1016- WTS |
| 17. | Indian Ranch Rancheria | Unknown | September 22, 1964 | | | Remains terminated as of 1997 |
| 18. | Lytton Rancheria | Lytton Band of Pomo Indians | August 1, 1961 | September 6, 1991 | 2000 | In 2000 federal legislation was passed granting the tribe a card room in San Pablo as a reservation. In 2002, a lawsuit was filed claiming the group was never a sovereign group and a second challenge was filed in 2003. The tribe defeated both and in 2004 Governor Arnold Schwarzenegger agreed to back the plan of an urban tribal casino. The casino began operations on 1 August 2005. |
| 19. | Mark West Rancheria | Unknown | August 1, 1961 | | | Remains terminated as of 1997 |
| 20. | Middletown Rancheria | Middletown Rancheria of Pomo Indians of California | —N/a | —N/a | —N/a | The ACCIP Termination Report: The Continuing Destructive Effects of the Termination Policy on California Indians, prepared by the Advisory Council on California Indian Policy in September, 1997 states that the Middletown Rancheria was never terminated. |
| 21. | Montgomery Creek Rancheria | Pit River Tribe, California | —N/a | —N/a | —N/a | The ACCIP Termination Report: The Continuing Destructive Effects of the Termination Policy on California Indians, prepared by the Advisory Council on California Indian Policy in September, 1997 states that the Montgomery Creek Rancheria was one of the land bases of the Pit River Tribe and was never terminated. |
| 22. | Mooretown Rancheria | Mooretown Rancheria of Maidu Indians | August 1, 1961 | December 22, 1983 | December 22, 1983 | By US Federal Court decision Tillie Hardwick, et al. v. United States of America, et al. Case #C-79-1710-SW At the time of the Hardwick I decision 445.31 acres (180.21 ha) were restored to the tribal trust. |
| 23. | Nevada City Rancheria | Nevada City Rancheria of Nisenan of Northern California | September 22, 1964 | | | On 2 December 2010, the Nevada County Historical Society board of directors unanimously rescinded their 2000 endorsement of the Plumas County Tsi Akim Maidu and acknowledged the Nevada City Rancheria tribe's claim of being the historical indigenous people of Nevada County. On 20 January 2010, the tribe filed a case in the US District Court of Northern California (C-10-00270-HRL) for wrongful termination, restoration and federal recognition of their tribe. |
| 24. | North Fork Rancheria | North Fork Rancheria of Mono Indians | February 18, 1966 | December 22, 1983 | December 22, 1983 | By US Federal Court decision Tillie Hardwick, et al. v. United States of America, et al. Case #C-79-1710-SW At the time of the Hardwick I decision 141.52 acres (57.27 ha) were restored to the tribal trust. |
| 25. | Paskenta Rancheria | Paskenta Band of Nomlaki Indians of California | April 11, 1961 | November 2, 1994 | November 2, 1994 | By federal statute. Public Law No. 103-454, 108 Stat. 4793 With the passage of their restoration law, 1,869.16 acres of land were restored to the tribal trust. |
| 26. | Picayune Rancheria | Picayune Rancheria of Chukchansi Indians of California | February 18, 1966 | December 22, 1983 | December 22, 1983 | By US Federal Court decision Tillie Hardwick, et al. v. United States of America, et al. Case #C-79-1710-SW At the time of the Hardwick I decision 28.76 acres of land were restored to the tribal trust. |
| 27. | Pinoleville Rancheria | Pinoleville Pomo Nation | February 18, 1966 | December 22, 1983 | December 22, 1983 | By US Federal Court decision Tillie Hardwick, et al. v. United States of America, et al. Case #C-79-1710-SW At the time of the Hardwick I decision 26.37 acres of land were restored to the tribal trust. |
| 28. | Potter Valley Rancheria | Potter Valley Tribe, California | August 1, 1961 | December 22, 1983 | | By US Federal Court decision Tillie Hardwick, et al. v. United States of America, et al. Case #C-79-1710-SW |
| 29. | Quartz Valley Rancheria | Quartz Valley Indian Community of the Quartz Valley Reservation of California | January 20, 1967 | December 22, 1983 | December 22, 1983 | By US Federal Court decision Tillie Hardwick, et al. v. United States of America, et al. Case #C-79-1710-SW At the time of the Hardwick I decision 129.64 acres of land were restored to the tribal trust. |
| 30. | Redding Rancheria | Redding Rancheria, California | June 20, 1962 | December 22, 1983 | December 22, 1983 | By US Federal Court decision Tillie Hardwick, et al. v. United States of America, et al. Case #C-79-1710-SW At the time of the Hardwick I decision 50.33 acres of land were restored to the tribal trust. |
| 31. | Redwood Valley Rancheria | Redwood Valley or Little River Band of Pomo Indians of the Redwood Valley Rancheria California | August 1, 1961 | December 22, 1983 | December 22, 1983 | By US Federal Court decision Tillie Hardwick, et al. v. United States of America, et al. Case #C-79-1710-SW At the time of the Hardwick I decision 176.52 acres of land were restored to the tribal trust. |
| 32. | Robinson Rancheria | Robinson Rancheria Band of Pomo Indians | September 3, 1965 | March 22, 1977 | June 29, 1977 | By US Federal Court decision Mabel Duncan, et al. v. Cecil D. Andrus, et al. Case Nos. C-71-1572-WWS, C-71-1713-WWS The 1977 ruling found that the tribal status must be "unterminated" and its tribal members were to regain federal benefits lost through their unlawful termination. Subsequently, two additional actions were filed. Mabel Duncan et al. v. the United States 597 F.2d 1337 found 18 April 1979 that the US government was liable for tribal damages. On 2 December 1981 the judge confirmed federal liability for damages in Mabel Duncan et al. v. the United States 667 F.2d 36. After the 1977 ruling, 153.22 acres of land were restored to the tribal trust. |
| 33. | Rohnerville Rancheria | Bear River Band of the Rohnerville Rancheria | July 16, 1966 | December 22, 1983 | December 22, 1983 | By US Federal Court decision Tillie Hardwick, et al. v. United States of America, et al. Case #C-79-1710-SW At the time of the Hardwick I decision 62.16 acres of land were restored to the tribal trust. |
| 34. | Ruffeys Rancheria | Unknown | April 11, 1962 | | | Remains terminated as of 1997 In 2017, Doug LaMalfa introduced the Ruffey Rancheria Restoration Act. |
| 35. | Scotts Valley Rancheria | Scotts Valley Band of Pomo Indians | September 3, 1965 | March 15, 1991 | March 15, 1991 | By US Federal Court decision Scotts Valley Band of Pomo Indians of the Sugar Bowl Rancheria, et al. v. United States of America, et al., No. C-86-3660-WWS Shortly after the Scotts Valley decision 0.79 acres of land were restored to the tribal trust. |
| 36. | Smith River Rancheria | Tolowa Dee-niʼ Nation | July 29, 1967 | December 22, 1983 | December 22, 1983 | By US Federal Court decision Tillie Hardwick, et al. v. United States of America, et al. Case #C-79-1710-SW At the time of the Hardwick I decision 89.49 acres of land were restored to the tribal trust. |
| 37. | Strawberry Valley Rancheria | Strawberry Valley Band of Pakan'yani Maidu | April 11, 1961 | | | In July, 2013 they met with Yuba County supervisors, in an attempt to win county endorsement of their efforts for federal recognition and tribal restoration. |
| 38. | Table Bluff Rancheria | The Wiyot Tribe, California | April 11, 1961 | September 21, 1981 | September 21, 1981 | By US Federal Court decision Table Bluff Band of Indians, et al. v. Cecil Andrus, et al. Case #C-75-2525-WTS At the time of the Table Bluff decision 87.99 acres of land were restored to the tribal trust. |
| 39. | Table Mountain Rancheria | Table Mountain Rancheria of California | 1959 | June 1983 | | By US Federal Court decision Table Mountain Rancheria Association v. James Watt, Secretary of the Interior, No. C-80-4595-MHP |
| 40. | Upper Lake Rancheria | Habematolel Pomo of Upper Lake, California | 1959 | May 15, 1979 | 2008 | By US Federal Court decision Upper Lake Pomo Association, et al. v. Cecil Andrus, et al. No. C-75-0181-SW (The reference to the tribes' restoration date in 1979 was found within other litigation concerning native gaming.) The tribe achieved renewed recognition of their tribal status at that time, but was unable restore their tribal land trust until 2008. |
| 41. | Wilton Rancheria | Me-Wuk Indian Community of the Wilton Rancheria | September 27, 1964 | 2009 | | The tribe regained their federal tribal recognition in 2009. In 2014, they were still attempting to have their tribal lands restored. |

The ACCIP Termination Report: The Continuing Destructive Effects of the Termination Policy on California Indians, (ACCIP Termination Report) prepared by the Advisory Council on California Indian Policy in September, 1997 lists 7 additional reservations which were terminated as a result of the 1964 Amendments to the Rancheria Act, which did not list them by name.

California Rancherias Terminated by 1964 Amendment
| | Rancheria or Reservation | Tribal entity | Date of termination | Date of Reinstatement | Date of Land Restoration | Details |
|---|---|---|---|---|---|---|
| 1. | El Dorado Rancheria | Miwok Tribe of the El Dorado Rancheria | July 16, 1966 | | | As of 2014 the Miwok Tribe of the El Dorado Rancheria has not sought to restore its federally-recognized sovereign status. |
| 2. | Mission Creek Reservation | Mission Creek Reservation | 1970 | | | The Serrano, Cahuilla and Cupeño and other peoples who formerly inhabited the Mission Creek Reservation filed a letter of intent to reinstate their tribal status with the Bureau of Indian Affairs on 19 July 2012. |
| 3. | Colfax Rancheria | Colfax Todds Valley Consolidated Tribe | 1965 | | | The Miwok and Maidu Indians of the Colfax Todds Valley Consolidated Tribe discovered in the 1970s that their reservation at the Colfax Rancheria was sold in 1965 by the Bureau of Indian Affairs. The local Nisenan attempted to get the land turned over for their use, but were unsuccessful in regaining the land. In 2000, the tribe reorganized in an attempt to be restored as a federally recognized Indian tribe. |
| 4. | Likely Rancheria | Pit River Tribe, California | —N/a | —N/a | —N/a | The ACCIP Termination Report indicates that this rancheria was sold; however, according to the April, 2014 List of Federally Recognized Tribes the Pit River Tribe includes the former rancherias of: XL Ranch, Big Bend, Likely, Lookout, Montgomery Creek and Roaring Creek Rancherias. |
| 5. | Lookout Rancheria | Pit River Tribe, California | —N/a | —N/a | —N/a | The ACCIP Termination Report indicates that this rancheria was sold; however, according to the April, 2014 List of Federally Recognized Tribes the Pit River Tribe includes the former rancherias of: XL Ranch, Big Bend, Likely, Lookout, Montgomery Creek and Roaring Creek Rancherias. |
| 6. | Strathmore Rancheria | Mono Indians of the Strathmore Rancheria | | | | The ACCIP Termination Report indicates that this rancheria was sold and specifically states, "These sales did not affect the status of any tribe;" however, in the 10 December 1965 issue of the Fresno Bee is a report that the Mono Indians of the Strathmore Rancheria were questioning the BIA decision to sell their reservation lands. |
| 7. | Taylorsville Rancheria | Tsi Akim Maidu of the Taylorsville Rancheria | | | | The Tsi Akim Maidu of the Taylorsville Rancheria are seeking federal recognition. In 2013, they were able to resecure a portion of their ancestral lands in Plumas County, California, but without federal recognition they are unable to have it restored as a reservation. |

== See also ==
- Aboriginal title in California
- California Indian Reservations and Cessions
- Western Oregon Indian Termination Act
- Bibliography of California history
