= Tillie Hardwick =

American activist (1924–1999)

Tillie Hardwick (née Myers; 1 August 1924 – 15 July 1999) was a Pomo Indian woman who was instrumental in reversing the California Indian Rancheria termination policy of the U.S. government.

== Early life ==
Tillie Myers was born 1 August 1924 to Joe Myers and Elisabeth Posh and grew up in Mendocino County, California on the Pinoleville Indian Rancheria, just north of Ukiah, California. Hardwick's family had lived in the Clear Lake drainage basin for many generations and she remembered stories told by her mother and aunt about her grandparents involvement in the Bloody Island Massacre of 1850.

When Congress passed a law in 1958 to terminate her tribe's reservation lands, under the Indian termination policy, tribal members agreed in exchange for private land ownership and improvements including sewers, running water, streets and fire hydrants. The government also promised to provide a special program of education and training designed to help the Indians to earn a livelihood. Hardwick and other tribal members were led to believe that termination was mandatory and they were unprepared for state and county taxation requirements of privately held lands. The government failed to provide plumbing for Hardwick's home and when she attempted to secure a loan to make repairs, she was unable to do so. No title company would issue a policy stating that she had marketable title.

When Hardwick's son, Joe, was denied educational benefits, she decided to take action for the failure of the government to live up to its promises to the tribe.

== California Rancheria termination litigation ==
In 1979, on the basis that termination was illegal since the improvements had not been done, Hardwick filed suit with the assistance of California Indian Legal Services, who decided to make the case a class action. In a decision dated 19 July 1983 a US District Court restored the status of 17 California rancherias:

- Big Valley Rancheria
- Blue Lake Rancheria
- Buena Vista Rancheria
- Chicken Ranch Rancheria
- Cloverdale Rancheria
- Elk Valley Rancheria
- Greenville Rancheria
- Mooretown Rancheria
- North Fork Rancheria
- Picayune Rancheria
- Pinoleville Rancheria
- Potter Valley Rancheria
- Quartz Valley Rancheria
- Redding Rancheria
- Redwood Valley Rancheria
- Rohnerville Rancheria
- Smith River Rancheria

The United States agreed to restore the status of the individual members of the Rancherias as Indians and acknowledged that the federal government would recognize as Indian entities the "Indian Tribes, Bands, Communities or groups" of these 17 Rancherias with the same status as they possessed prior to termination. The United States also agreed that tribal members could elect to restore their fee simple lands which had been former trust allotments to trust status, to be held by the United States for their benefit. The first Hardwick decision (Tillie Hardwick, et al. v. United States of America, et al. Case #C-79-1710-SW) did not determine whether or to what extent the boundaries of the 17 Rancherias were restored, but it did establish the basis on which the Bureau of Indian Affairs (BIA) was to ensure that those who formed the initial tribal governments and re-organized them were the individuals who properly had the right to do so.

On 31 January 1986 the Hardwick plaintiffs amended their complaint (often cited as Hardwick II) and added a number of tribes that had reconstituted their former federally recognized governments to be able to intervene in the litigation and dropped as defendants those counties that had voluntarily resolved their issues with tribes in their jurisdictions. The decisions issued throughout 1986 and 1987 established the boundaries of various Rancherias and settled taxation disputes with some of the California counties involved.

== Family and personal life ==
Hardwick was the mother of four children. Three sons: Robert Hopper, who predeceased Hardwick; Joseph A. Myers attorney and founder of the National Indian Justice Center; and Larry Myers (youngest son) of Sacramento who served as Executive Secretary of the California Native American Heritage Commission from 1987 to 2011; and one daughter, Joyce A. Britton, of Willits, California.

== Legacy ==
On the basis of her suit's success, other tribes throughout California began fighting for recognition and restoration by the federal government. There had been 6 termination reversals prior to Tillie Hardwick v. United States. The Robinson Rancheria was restored 22 March 1977; the Hopland Rancheria was restored 29 March 1978; the Upper Lake Rancheria was restored 15 May 1979; the Table Bluff Rancheria was restored 21 September 1981; the Big Sandy Rancheria was restored 28 March 1983; and the Table Mountain Rancheria was restored in June, 1983. Each of these decisions only pertained to one reservation. The Hardwick decision restored more terminated tribes than any other single case in California.

The impact of the Hardwick decisions is immeasurable. The native peoples whose tribes were restored through the class-action lawsuit she instituted continue to be referred to as "Hardwick Indians." The decision has been cited as jurisprudence for countless state and federal tribal litigation cases since it was originally rendered. The policy that the Bureau of Indian Affairs established to confirm that the initial members reinstating a tribe are the historical tribal members has been used in litigation in many states outside of California. The boundaries established in the 1987 Hardwick II decision have been reviewed as the basis for California gambling establishments on tribal lands since the inception of the Indian Gaming Regulatory Act (IGRA).
