= Luwana Quitiquit =

Native American administrator, activist and basket weaver

- Quitiquit, 1979
- Born: Luwana Fay Quitiquit; November 13, 1941; Isleton, Sacramento County, California
- Died: December 23, 2011 (aged 70); Nice, Lake County, California
- Citizenship: American
- Education: University of California, Berkeley
- Occupations: Administrator, artist, and activist
- Years active: 1961–2011
- Spouse: Ed Castillo
- Children: 1

Luwana Quitiquit (Pomo, November 13, 1941 – December 23, 2011) was a Native American administrator, activist, and basket weaver. During the Occupation of Alcatraz she worked as one of the cooks who provided food to those living on the island. Her career was as an administrator for various California Indian organizations. Subsequently, she became a well-known doll maker, basketweaver, jeweler, and teacher of Pomo handicrafts. In 2008, she and her family were disenrolled from the Robinson Rancheria of Pomo Indians of California. She fought the action claiming it was politically motivated until her death. Posthumously, in 2017, her membership, as well as for her other family members, was reinstated in the first known case where a tribe reversed its decision on membership termination without a court ruling.

== Early life ==
Luwana Kay Quitiquit was born on November 13, 1941, in Isleton, Sacramento County, California to Marie (née Boggs) and Claro A. Quitiquit. Her mother was an Eastern Pomo and a member of the Robinson Rancheria of Pomo Indians of California. Her father was from Caoayan, in the Ilocos Sur province of the Philippines. Her entire family worked in agriculture as farm laborers in the Sacramento–San Joaquin River Delta. She attended the David Bixler Elementary School in Tracy, California and graduated from Tracy Joint Union High School.

== Career ==
After her graduation, Quitiquit began working as a secretary at the University of California, Berkeley. In November 1969, she took her children, Alan and Christina Harrison, and Tyrone A. Douglas (1966–2004), sailing from Sausalito, California to Alcatraz Island. They participated in the Occupation of Alcatraz and along with Linda Aranaydo (Muscogee Creek), Quitiquit provided food for the people living on the island. While on Alcatraz, she met Edward D. Castillo (Luiseño-Cahuilla), an activist and member of the initial board of directors for the Indians of All Tribes, with whom she would later marry and have a daughter, Suelumatra. Quitiquit and her children stayed on the island until the occupation ended in 1971.

After attending courses at the University of California, Riverside, Quitiquit completed her bachelor's degree from University of California, Berkeley in 1977. During her schooling, she began taking basket weaving lessons from Mabel McKay, last surviving tribe member of the Cache Creek Pomo nation and a world-renowned Pomo basket maker. To reach McKay's home in Nice, California, Quitiquit had to travel over 80 miles. After completing her studies, Quitiquit moved to San Bernardino, California and became the executive director of the San Bernardino Indian Center and in 1979 worked in the Office of Criminal Justice Planning in Sacramento.

By the early 1980s, Quitiquit was directing the Economic Advancement for Rural Tribal Habitats (EARTH) organization in Ukiah, which focused on economic development for American Indians living in Lake County, California, and in areas around Mendocino and Sonoma. She worked to obtain state and federal grants to assist in community infrastructure projects for the Coyote Valley Reservation and Hopland, Laytonville, Manchester-Point Arena, Robinson, and Upper Lake Rancherias. From 1986 through 2009 she represented the Robinson Rancheria on the InterTribal Sinkyone Wilderness Council. The council was designed to conserve and protect 7,100 acres of land recovered from Georgia Pacific Corporation and which was eventually split by giving 3,300 acres to the Sinkyone Wilderness State Park and the remaining 3,800 acres to the consortium of 10 federally recognized tribal groups. Because of the need for native plants to make traditional baskets, she worked to establish gardens and pass on her knowledge of native plants to younger tribe members.

Simultaneously with her work on the council, Quitiquit worked in Redwood Valley, California as deputy director of the Consolidated Tribal Health Project and participated in educational seminars. Her vision of wellness for Native people included not only physical and mental health, but ties to artistic and cultural traditions. When she retired, Quitiquit began working on and exhibiting her handicrafts more regularly. Though mostly known for her basketwork and cradle weavings, she also produced dolls made of acorns and jewelry made from traditional abalone, beads, nuts and shells. Quitiquit organized a system to train Pomo weavers and preserve the traditional craft. Using her skills as a grant writer, she was able to find funding to establish training courses in both weaving and gathering traditional materials needed to carry on the craft. She taught one member from each of the seven Lake County Pomo tribes, who in turn trained others. She also operated the Pomo Fine Art Gallery in Lucerne to give native artists a venue to market their works.

== Disenrollment ==
In 2008, Quitiquit and her entire family were terminated from tribal membership in the Robinson Rancheria. The disenrollment occurred in a dispute which the Tribal Chair Tracey Avila characterized as removing improperly enrolled members. Avila stated that while the ousted members were definitely American Indian, she believed that they were enrolled in the wrong tribe. Quitiquit maintained that the issue had to do with a disputed election, in which her family had supported Eddie "EJ" Crandall, who won the election but whose victory was set aside by the claim by Avila that he should be terminated from membership and was disqualified from running in the election.

As a result of the disenrollments, Quitiquit and her family lost their tribal housing benefits, health care, jobs, education benefits and cultural ties, as well as retirement benefits and elder meal services. She worked to raise funds to mount a legal battle against the termination of membership. In 2010, the Bureau of Indian Affairs refused to intervene, stating that the issue of tribal membership was an internal governance decision. After the ruling, the Tribal Council convened a Tribal Court in 2011 to evaluate eviction orders for the family members. During the trials, Quitiquit died and her family vowed to continue the quest for reinstatement to their tribe.

== Death and legacy ==
Quitiquit died on December 23, 2011, at her home in Nice, Lake County, California. In 2012, the Tribal Court issued eviction notices for her family and posthumously for Quitiquit. In 2015, Crandall was elected Tribal Chair and led a campaign to readmit disenrolled tribal members. Two years later, under his leadership, the Tribal Council voted to reinstate all members of the Quitiquit family and others who had been terminated from tribal membership in 2008. The reinstatement was the first known case in the country where a tribe reversed its decision on membership termination without a court ruling.
