= InterTribal Sinkyone Wilderness Council =

Consortium of Northern California tribal nations

- Formation: 1986; 40 years ago
- Type: Nonprofit
- Headquarters: PO Box 1523
- Location: Ukiah, CA 95482, United States
- Methods: Environmental and cultural preservation
- Website: sinkyone.org

The InterTribal Sinkyone Wilderness Council is a consortium of Northern California tribal nations focused on environmental and cultural preservation. The council, which includes members of 10 federally recognized tribes in Mendocino and Lake counties, has worked to protect lands of cultural importance along the North Coast within the traditional Sinkyone tribal territory since it was established in 1986. Nonprofit and governmental organizations have cooperated with the council in the restoration of property to descendants of its original inhabitants which is part of an effort to return Indigenous lands and autonomy to Indigenous communities. After the invasion of the traditional Sinkyone tribal territory by multitudes of Euro-American settlers in the mid-1850s, Sinkyone people eventually became enrolled members at several tribes located throughout the region. The council is made up of the Cahto Indian Tribe of the Laytonville Rancheria, Coyote Valley Band of Pomo Indians, Hopland Band of Pomo Indians, Pinoleville Pomo Nation, Potter Valley Tribe, Redwood Valley Rancheria of Pomo Indians, Robinson Rancheria of Pomo Indians, Round Valley Indian Tribes, Scotts Valley Band of Pomo Indians and Sherwood Valley Rancheria of Pomo Indians.

Intertribal Sinkyone Wilderness on the Lost Coast of Mendocino County is considered the nation's first intertribal wilderness. The 3,845-acre site (1,556 ha) was acquired by the council in 1997 following a campaign led by The Trust for Public Land. Four Corners was donated to the council in 2012 by the Save the Redwoods League which is an organization focused on the protection and restoration of coast redwood and giant sequoia forests and connecting people to them. As part of their effort to return lands and autonomy to Indigenous communities, the league donated and transferred the forest land to the tribal council while retaining a conservation easement.

The council designated Tc'ih-Léh-Dûñ, (pronounced "tsih-ih-LEY-duhn"), as a tribal protected area which recognizes that it is within the Sinkyone traditional territory and that it holds great cultural significance for the council and its member tribes as it was the hunting, fishing and ceremonial grounds of generations of Indigenous peoples. Tc'ih-Léh-Dûñ, which means "fish run place" in the Sinkyone language, was acquired from the Save the Redwoods League in 2022. Located west of the Sinkyone Wilderness State Park and north of the Intertribal Sinkyone Wilderness, the remote 523-acre area (212 ha) (formerly known as Andersonia West) had been purchased by the league in July 2020. As part of their effort to return lands and autonomy to Indigenous communities, the league again donated and transferred the forest land to the tribal council while retaining a conservation easement.
