= Ed Castillo =

Native American rights activist from California

Edward D. Castillo
- Born: January 1, 1948 (age 78); San Jacinto, California, U.S.
- Other name: Ed Castillo
- Citizenship: American
- Education: University of California, Riverside; UCLA
- Occupations: Activist, historian, professor
- Employer: Sonoma State University (former)
- Known for: Participation in the Occupation of Alcatraz, Native American scholarship
- Children: 3

Edward D. Castillo is an American activist of Luiseño and Cahuilla ancestry. He participated in the American Indian occupation of Alcatraz in 1969. Former professor and director of Native American Studies at the Sonoma State University in California, he wrote several chapters in the Smithsonian Institution's Handbook of North American Indians and Mission Indian Federation: Protecting Tribal Sovereignty 1919-1967, published in the Encyclopedia of Native Americans in the 20th century. He is the editor of Native American Perspectives on the Hispanic Colonization of Alta California and The Pomo, A Tribal History. Castillo was a regular contributor of book reviews to historical journals such as Indian Historian, Journal of California Anthropology, Western Historical Quarterly, American Indian Quarterly, and California History.

== Early life ==
Castillo was born in 1948 in California to Edward and Betty Castillo and has two brothers Billy and Randy. He was raised on a rancheria outside San Jacinto. After high school, he enrolled in the University of California, Riverside with a major in American frontier history and a minor in Latin American studies. After graduating in 1969, Castillo took a minority counseling position at the University of California, Berkeley, instructing a seminar style class that often confronted and attempted to correct the innate social misguided behavior of the dominant white classes. In that same year, he was hired as a graduate student instructor in UC Berkeley’s newly established Native American Studies program. Ed is the recognized father of Suelumatra with Luwana Quitiquit, and Cassandra and Andrew Castillo (second marriage), although he may have other children.

== Participation at Alcatraz ==
Castillo first got involved with the American Indian occupation of Alcatraz when Richard Oakes, the foremost organizer of the demonstration, gave a speech at UCLA attempting to get more support for the protest in mid-November 1969. Oakes had been giving similarly effective speeches at San Francisco State University, University of California, Berkeley, and University of California, Riverside. Castillo, along with about two-thirds of the Native American studies class he was teaching, agreed to take leave from his position at UCLA and join the occupation. He was 21 years old at the time.

When he arrived at Alcatraz, Castillo was one of the original members of the island council, along with Richard Oakes and a number of other college students. The island council oversaw everything that occurred on the island. Castillo also worked in the makeshift mail room of the island.

Early on during the occupation, Castillo was voted as security chief of the island, but soon resigned from the difficult position after numerous threats from much larger young Indian males.

When Richard Oakes left the island due to the death of his daughter, Castillo began to notice the burgeoning of inner conflicts within the island's population. He believed the original idealism of the island was faltering, and many of the island's leaders were focused more on the political and financial benefits of the protest. After nearly three months of participating in the occupation, Castillo decided to return to UCLA to fulfill his teaching duties.

== Later life ==
Castillo was the director of the Native American studies program at Sonoma State University. He has worked on numerous books, usually dealing with the history of California Native American tribes. The majority of his scholarly works focus on the impact of Spanish colonization on Native Americans in the 17th and 18th centuries. He shocked the mission studies world by publishing an oral history by Lorenzo Asisara given in 1878 which explained how the Indians at Santa Cruz murdered the missionary Andres Quintana in retaliation for whippings the friar had given with a barb-tipped whip, and then set the girls free for a night of sex. He coauthored Indians, Franciscans, and Spanish Colonization: The Impact of the Mission System on California Indians with Robert H. Jackson.
