= Buena Vista Rancheria of Me-Wuk Indians of California =

Indian tribe in California, United States

Regions with significant populations
- United States (California)

Languages
- English, historically Northern Sierra Miwok language, Central Sierra Miwok language, and Southern Sierra Miwok language

Related ethnic groups
- other Miwok tribes

The Buena Vista Rancheria of Me-Wuk Indians of California is a federally recognized tribe of Miwok in Amador County, California. The Buena Vista Miwok are Sierra Miwok, an indigenous people of California.

== Government ==
The tribe conducts business from Sacramento, California. The tribe is led by an elected council. The current tribal chairperson is Rhonda Morningstar Pope.

Tribal enrollment is based in lineal descent from original tribal members; that is, the tribe has no minimum blood quantum requirements.

In 2013, the federal acknowledgment of "Buena Vista Rancheria of Me-Wuk Indians," was being challenged by a lawsuit that was awaiting scheduling in the Ninth Circuit Court of appeals in San Francisco in "Friends of Amador County, et al. versus Ken Salazar, et al."

== Reservation ==
The Buena Vista Rancheria (Northern Sierra Miwok: әpәsani) is a census-designated place is 67 acres (0.27 km^{2}) parcel of land, located just outside the census-designated place of Buena Vista. The land once belonged to the Oliver family and was purchased by the federal government to establish an Indian rancheria in 1927.

== Casino ==
Harrah's Northern California is a tribal casino owned by the tribe and located on its reservation. Caesars Entertainment manages the casino and licenses the Harrah's name to the tribe. The casino has 71,000 square feet (6,600 m^{2}) of gaming space with 20 table games and about 1,000 slot machines.

The tribe won its legal fight against Amador County to allow the development of the casino in 2016. In 2018, the tribe sold $205 million of high-interest junk bonds to finance the project, and struck its development agreement with Caesars. The casino opened on 29 April 2019.

== History ==
The rancheria was unilaterally terminated by Congress, along with 42 other rancherias, under the California Rancheria Act of 1958. The tribe has been federally recognized since 1985. In 1970, President Richard Nixon declared the Rancheria Act a failure. The Buena Vista Rancheria tribe joined 16 other native California tribes in a class action lawsuit, Tillie Hardwick v. United States to restore their sovereignty, and in 1987, the tribes won their lawsuit. On 22 December 1983 the Buena Vista Rancheria tribe ratified its constitution.

== See also ==
- Plains and Sierra Miwok
- California Rancheria Termination Acts

== Notes ==
=== References ===
- Pritzker, Barry M. A Native American Encyclopedia: History, Culture, and Peoples. Oxford: Oxford University Press, 2000. ISBN 978-0-19-513877-1
