= Graton Rancheria =

Former native Indian settlements in Northern California

Coordinates: 38°24′59.32″N 122°52′58.89″W

- Indian reservation
- Interactive map of Graton Rancheria

The Graton Rancheria was a 15.45-acre (62,500 m^{2}) property in the coastal hills of northern California, about two miles (3 km) northwest of Sebastopol. The site is about 1.5 miles (2.4 km) southwest of the hamlet of Graton, population 1,815 in 2000. The area is a few miles west of Santa Rosa, the largest of Sonoma County's nine cities and the County seat, population 178,127 in 2020. It was a former rancheria for Central Coast and Central valley tribes, including the Southern Pomo, a Hokan-speaking tribe, and Coast Miwok.

== History ==
Due to the influx of non-Native settlers in California beginning in the mid-19th century, many California Indians were displaced from their traditional homelands. Several California tribes signed treaties with the United States in 1851 which promised lands to the tribes; however these treaties were never ratified and many California tribes were left completely landless. In 1901, the United States Congress passed several laws, known as the Homeless Indian Acts. These paved the way for the establishment of Indian colonies and rancherías in California, which were purchased lands for area Indians. A ranchería, the Spanish term for Indian village, is a small plot of land reserved for area Native Americans, usually only large enough for residences and gardens.

Bureau of Indian Affairs inspector John J. Terrell tried to secure coastal lands for the Coast Miwok but found the costs prohibitively expensive. He then purchased lands inland for the "homeless and landless Indians of the Marshall, Bodega, Tomales, and Sebastopol areas."

75 Native Americans tried to move onto the lands in 1920; however, they discovered only three acres of the rancheria were habitable.

Prior to 1921, the hilly and heavily timbered 15.45-acre (62,500 m^{2}) property, consisting of 3 small tracts, was the private property of Joseph and Louisa Corda. This land was put into federal trust; however, it proved inadequate for settlement, due to an inadequate water supply and steep terrain that afforded little space for building houses. The rancheria was located far from available jobs.

=== Termination ===
By 1954, the Eisenhower administration identified forty-four California Indian tribes or rancherias for termination, that is, unilaterally ended federal trust relationship with the Native groups in order to facilitate assimilation into mainstream society. The Graton Ranchería was terminated by the US in 1958.

After termination, Frank Truvido retrained an acre of the former ranchería. He had to sell other land to pay taxes. After Truvido's death, his land and house went to his daughter.

Greg Sarris, chairman of the modern Federated Indians of Graton Rancheria, speaking to Congress on May 16, 2000, said:

"In 1958 when they came by and did a census at the height of the harvest season, when no one was around, they found three families and with the Rancheria Termination Act, offered those three families or three designees, the right to buy the land, and, in essence, terminate the rancheria as trust land… (and) without the vote or the consensus of the rest of the members."

The Point Reyes Light quoted Sarris, saying "Congress…dissolved federal recognition of the tribe in 1958 after deciding wrongly that all the Rancheria’s members were dead."

== The Federated Indians of Graton Rancheria ==
The Federated Indians of Graton Rancheria, formerly the Federated Coast Miwok, takes its name from the Graton Rancheria. The federally recognized tribe of Coast Miwok and Southern Pomo Indians re-established its status in 2000.

FIGR Chairman Greg Sarris testified before the House Resource Committee that "15.45 acres were purchased in Graton for our members. Seventy-five members moved on in 1920."

On April 18, 2008, the tribe was able to acquire 254 acres (1.03 km^{2}) of land.

== Casino ==
Graton Rancheria is the site of the Graton Resort & Casino, which opened in November 2013. The casino is actually near Rohnert Park.

== Bibliography ==
- Eargle, Jr., Dolan H. (1992). California Indian Country: The Land & the People. San Francisco: Tree Company Press. ISBN 978-0-93740-120-0.
- Eargle, Jr., Dolan H. (2000). Native California Guide: Weaving the Past & Present. San Francisco: Tree Company Press. ISBN 978-0-93740-110-1.
