= Nevada City Rancheria =

Historical land of the Nisenan people in California, USA

The Nevada City Rancheria was the federally recognized land and name of the Nisenan Native American people in Northern California. The Rancheria land was obtained in 1887 by Tribal Chief Charley Cully. When he died in 1911, the land allotment was converted by an executive order of President Woodrow Wilson into the Nevada City Rancheria.

== Termination ==
As part of Indian termination policy in California, the California Rancheria Termination Acts in the 1950s and 1960s terminated dozens of Rancherias. Many have since regained their federal recognition. In 1983, 17 northern California tribes were restored through a class action settlement in the case Hardwick v United States but the Rancheria was not included in the paperwork.

== Recognition ==
The Nevada City Rancheria was located on Cement Hill in Nevada City, California. In 2010, the Greater Cement Hill Neighborhood Association, a Homeowners Association, “welcomed home” the Nisenan of the Nevada City Rancheria at their 20-year anniversary picnic.

== See also ==
- Indian termination policy
- Ranchería
