= The Corners, California =

The Corners, California may refer to:

- The Corners, former name of Buena Vista, Amador County, California
- The Corners, former name of Boonville, California
