= Ackerman Creek =

Stream in California, USA

Ackerman Creek Tributary to Russian River
- Location of Ackerman Creek mouth Ackerman Creek (the United States)

Location
- Country: United States
- State: California
- County: Mendocino

Physical characteristics
- Source: South Fork Big River divide
  - location: about 2 miles northwest of Mann Ranch, California
  - coordinates: 39°13′18″N 123°20′23″W
  - elevation: 2,100 ft (640 m)
- Mouth: Russian River
  - location: about 1 mile north of Ukiah, California
  - coordinates: 39°10′43″N 123°11′57″W
  - elevation: 604 ft (184 m)
- Length: 11.50 mi (18.51 km)
- Basin size: 19.78 square miles (51.2 km^{2})
- Discharge
  - location: Russian River
  - average: 30.27 cu ft/s (0.857 m^{3}/s) at mouth with Russian River

Basin features
- Progression: Russian River → Pacific Ocean
- River system: Russian River
- Tributaries
  - left: unnamed tributaries
  - right: unnamed tributaries
- Bridges: Masonite Road (x4), Orr Springs Road, US 101, N State Street

Ackerman Creek is a stream located in the U.S. state of California. It is located in Mendocino County.

Ackerman Creek (Ya-mo bida - wind hole creek) runs through the Pinoleville Reservation in Mendocino County, and is of biocultural significance to the Pomo tribe of Native Americans. Ackerman Creek is central to Pinoleville Pomo cultural subsistence practices, as it is a source of water for the nation's sweat lodge, supports a salmon population, and its native vegetation is used in a variety of cultural practices including basketry.

The Pinoleville Pomo Nation currently has restoration efforts underway to remove invasive species, propagate native species including steelhead, and conduct ongoing monitoring of ground water, surface water, vegetation, macroinvertebrates, fish, and birds.

== Course ==
Ackerman Creek rises about 2 miles northwest of Mann Ranch, California, in Mendocino County and then flows generally east to join the Russian River about 1 mile north of Ukiah.

== Watershed ==
Ackerman Creek drains 19.78 square miles (51.2 km^{2}) of area, receives about 49.4 in/year of precipitation, has a wetness index of 268.37, and is about 49% forested.
