= Elk Valley Rancheria =

Tribe of Tolowa and Yurok people

Coordinates: 41°45′37″N 124°09′12″W

Location of Elk Valley Rancheria

The Elk Valley Rancheria (Tolowa: T’uu-nes) is a ranchería and federally recognized tribe of Tolowa and Yurok people. It is located in the census-designated place of Bertsch-Oceanview, Del Norte County, California, just east of Crescent City. As of the 2010 Census, the population was 99.

== Education ==
The ranchería is served by the Del Norte County Unified School District.

== History ==
Elk Valley Rancheria was originally founded in the early twentieth century with the intent to provide for displaced Native Americans. The ranchería was held in trust by the United States until the California Rancheria Termination Acts in 1958. In 1983, Hardwick v. United States created the "1983 Stipulation", allowing the Elk Valley Rancheria to reform their lands into a United States-held trust and be federally recognized as a tribe.

Modern map of Elk Valley Rancheria and nearby reservations (In red.)

== See also ==
- List of Indian reservations in the United States
