= Kotasi, California =

Kotasi is a former Maidu village in Plumas County, California, United States. Kotasi was located 3 miles (4.8 km) east of Greenville, but its precise location is unknown.

== See also ==
- Greenville Rancheria of Maidu Indians
