= Rancherie =

A rancherie is a First Nations residential area of an Indian reserve in colloquial English throughout the Canadian province of British Columbia. Originating in an adaptation of ranchería, a Californian term for the residential area of a rancho, where most farm hands were aboriginal, the term later came to be used throughout British Columbia.

In modern usage, it is often a new residential area, but traditionally it is the oldest group of residences, typically log cabins or similar, generally clustered around a church. In some reserves where there is more than one residential area, "the rancherie" would mean a specific one of the group, typically the oldest. Rancherie does not refer to the whole of a reserve, or of a group of reserves run by a band government, but only to the community area so designated. The term is also in wide use outside of First Nations peoples, and is generally part of the vernacular in most small British Columbia towns with adjacent or contiguous Indian Reserves, with little or no derogatory overtones.

== The Kanaka Rancherie ==
Historically the term could also be used for certain non-aboriginal (but also non-white, mostly) communities, most notably the Kanaka Rancherie on Vancouver's Lost Lagoon, which was the core of the local Hawaiian community since the earliest days of Gastown, its remnants – also known as the Cherry Orchard (source?) – lasting well into the 1920s.

== See also ==
- Ranchería
- First Nations in British Columbia
- Indian reserve
