= Linda Aranaydo =

Native American educator, physician, and activist

- Born: 1948 (age 77–78)
- Education: University of California, Berkeley (B.A.); University of California, San Francisco (M.D.)
- Occupations: Educator, physician

Linda Susan Aranaydo (born 1948) is a Native American educator, physician, and activist. A participant in the 1969–1971 occupation of Alcatraz, she worked as a teacher on Alcatraz Island before working for the Indian Health Service. Among other honors, Aranaydo is the recipient of the 1995 David Vanderryn Award for Outstanding Community Service as a Family Physician.

== Education ==
Linda Aranaydo earned a B.A. in social sciences at the University of California, Berkeley. At the age of 37, Aranaydo began medical school and earned an M.D. at the University of California, San Francisco in 1992.

== Career ==
Aranaydo started her career as a preschool teacher at Hintil Native American Children's Center in Oakland, California. She continued teaching for 11 years before deciding to go to medical school. After attending medical school, and earning her postgraduate medical degree, she started her new career in the medical field. After earning her M.D., she worked in a variety of professional settings, from being a medical provider to providing technical assistance and individual teaching services to Indian clinics. Aranaydo was a primary care provider based in Northern California for five years.

Aranaydo has also served on several councils and boards. In 1977, she served on the Governor's Task Force on Early Childhood Education. From 1978 to 1980 she was a part of the California State American Indian Education Council. Currently, Aranaydo is the director of medical services for the California Rural Indian Health Board. Aranaydo described how her career goals related to her life experience in an interview for Changing the Face of Medicine:

"Since a young age I had seen the tragic effects of untreated chronic illness in family, friends and elders who were reluctant to seek or unable to obtain health care. I have lost dear family members in California and Oklahoma to the complications of diabetes. My goal was to become a primary care provider and to help provide easily accessible, culturally appropriate quality health care to American Indians and other underserved people."

== Activism ==
Aranaydo was one of 14 people who first attempted to occupy Alcatraz Island on November 9, 1969. On November 20, the group returned to the island and initiated the occupation of Alcatraz. During the occupation, Aranaydo taught in the school and worked with Luwana Quitiquit (Pomo) to run the kitchen for the occupants. She attended the protest while pursuing her education at UC Berkeley. This protest ultimately had a major impact on federal Indian policy.

== Awards and honors ==
Aranaydo obtained several awards and honors throughout her academic and professional career. In 1970, while pursuing her Bachelor's degree at the University of California, Berkeley, she won an award of distinction in general scholarship for her academic achievements. While studying at the University of California, San Francisco, she was the recipient of the Robert Crede Award for Excellence in Primary Care Medicine for her outstanding academic work. Aranaydo's work to help her Native American community avoid preventable diseases earned her the David Vanderryn Award for Outstanding Community Service as a Family Physician in 1995.

== Selected works ==
- Mankiller, Wilma (2011). Every Day Is a Good Day: Reflections by Contemporary Indigenous Women. Contribution by Linda Aranaydo. Fulcrum Publishing. ISBN 9781555916916.
