= Federated Indians of Graton Rancheria =

Total population
- 1,080

Regions with significant populations
- United States (California)

Languages
- English, Pomo, Miwok language

Religion
- Roundhouse religion, Christianity, Kuksu

Related ethnic groups
- Miwok and Pomo people

The Federated Indians of Graton Rancheria, formerly known as the Federated Coast Miwok, is a federally recognized American Indian tribe of Coast Miwok and Southern Pomo Indians. The tribe was officially restored to federal recognition in 2000 by the U.S. government pursuant to the Graton Rancheria Restoration Act.

== Early history ==
Prior to European contact, the residents of Marin and Sonoma Counties were bands of Native Californians belonging to two linguistic and cultural groups: the Coast Miwok and Southern Pomo, living in close proximity to each other and indigenous to Marin and southern Sonoma Counties in Northern California. Occupied at various times during more than thirty centuries, over 600 village sites have been identified in the Coast Miwok territory, stretching from Bodega Bay to the north, eastward beyond the towns of Cotati and Sonoma, and along the Point Reyes National Seashore and the shores of Tomales Bay.

The year 1579 was the earliest recorded account made by the Europeans of the Coast Miwok people on the coast of Marin in the Point Reyes area, as documented in a diary by Chaplain Fletcher who was aboard Sir Francis Drake's ship. In 1595, The Coast Miwok came into contact with the crew of the San Agustin, a Manila Galleon, captained by Sebastião Rodrigues Soromenho and crewed by Filipino mariners. During the Mission Period of 1779–1823, Mission San Francisco de Asís (also called "Mission Dolores"), Mission San Rafael Arcángel and Mission San Francisco Solano used Indians, including the Coast Miwok and Southern Pomo people, as a key source of labor.

As early as 1830, a Filipino named Domingo Felix married a Coast Miwok woman named Euphrasia Valencia, and they started a family who later settled in Lairds Landing in 1861. The family who descended from this multiracial couple remained there until 1955. Some of the Coast Miwok trace their lineage to this couple.

The territorial lands of the Southern Pomo are in Sonoma County, south of the Russian River to the southern Santa Rosa area. The Southern Pomo were the first inhabitants of what is now the town of Sebastopol, with several smaller traditional Southern Pomo villages located southeast of Sebastopol along the Laguna de Santa Rosa. California anthropologist Alfred L. Kroeber stated:

Batiklechawi, at Sebastapol at the head of the slough known as Laguna de Santa Rosa, was an important town, and therefore presumably the headquarters of a division [of the Southern Pomo]. Another group tentatively may be inferred as having occupied the bulk of the shores of the laguna.

== Recent history ==
Most of the Coast Miwok continued to live in their traditional lands through the 20th century. They worked in sawmills, as agricultural laborers, and fished to supplement their incomes.

The Graton Rancheria was a 15-acre (61,000 m^{2}) Indian rancheria near Sebastopol in Sonoma County. The rancheria was established for Coast Miwok, Southern Pomo, and other Indians living in the region. In 1920, when Indians began to settle the land, they discovered that all but three acres (12,000 m^{2}) were inhospitable.

The US government terminated the trust agreement (federal recognition) of the Graton Rancheria in 1958. Gloria Armstrong (Miwok) privately owned a 1-acre (4,000 m^{2}) lot of the previous rancheria. In 1992, the tribe initiated the procedure to regain federal recognition. Recognition was achieved on December 27, 2000 through the Graton Rancheria Restoration Act passed by the U.S. Congress. On April 18, 2008, the tribe acquired 254 acres (1.03 km^{2}) of land.

Since 2007, the Federated Indians of Graton Rancheria has collaborated with Occidental Arts and Ecology in Occidental, California to create workshops called Tradition Environmental Knowledge on organic farming, herbology, native plant restoration, and ethnobotany.

== Government ==
The tribe has approximately 1,438 members (1,438 as of October 1, 2019). The tribe's government offices are located in Rohnert Park, California. Tribal governmental programs and services include sacred sites preservation and protection, Indian housing, Indian education, membership, cultural arts, social services, and tribal health.

The Federated Indians of Graton Rancheria are governed by a seven-member Tribal Council who are elected to two-year terms by the adult tribal membership. The current administration includes:

- Tribal Chairman: Greg Sarris
- Vice-Chair: Patricia Miraz
- Treasurer: Joan Harper
- Secretary: Melissa Elgin
- Councilmember: Robert Stafford
- Councilmember: Lawrence Stafford
- Councilmember: Matthew Johnson.

== Notable tribal members ==
- Julia F. Parker, b. 1928, master basket weaver
- Greg Sarris, b. 1952, professor and author

== See also ==
- Advisory Council on California Indian Policy

== Bibliography ==
- Kroeber, Alfred L. Handbook of the Indians of California, Volume 1. Whitefish, MT: Kessinger Publishing, 2006 (Reprint). ISBN 978-1-4286-4492-2.
- Pritzker, Barry M. A Native American Encyclopedia: History, Culture, and Peoples. Oxford: Oxford University Press, 2000. ISBN 978-0-19-513877-1.
