= Big Sandy Rancheria =

Indian tribe in California, United States

Coordinates: 37.082491°N 119.463997°W

Big Sandy Rancheria of Mono Indians
Total population
- 96 enrolled members

Regions with significant populations
- United States ( California)

Languages
- English, Western Mono

Religion
- Traditional tribal religion, Christian, formerly Ghost Dance

Related ethnic groups
- Other Mono tribes

The Big Sandy Rancheria of Mono Indians of California is a ranchería and federally recognized tribe of Western Mono Indians (Monache) located in Fresno County, California, United States. As of the 2010 Census the population was 118. In 1909, the Bureau of Indian Affairs (BIA) bought 280 acres (110 ha) of land for the Big Sandy Band of Western Mono Indians.

== Reservation ==
Location of Big Sandy Rancheria

The Big Sandy Rancheria, located just outside the community of Auberry, in Fresno County, is 228 acres (0.92 km^{2}) large. In 1990, 38 tribal members lived on the reservation. In 2009, approximately 158 out of 495 enrolled tribal members lived on the reservation. The reservation is very secluded, and the tribal headquarters is situated within a ring of houses.

== History ==
In 1909, the BIA purchased 280 acres (110 ha) of land for the Big Sandy Band of Western Mono Indians. It was bought in order to provide the tribe with a secure home where they could grow their food, have cattle, and be free from attacks by non-Indians.

In 1958, Congress enacted the California Rancheria Termination Act which affected 41 California rancherias, which also included Big Sandy Rancheria. It terminated the trust status of the lands and Indian status. In 1966, Big Sandy Rancheria organized the BSR Association because of this act. The BSR Association was formed so they could receive common property and be able to approve the distribution plan made by the BIA for the termination of the rancheria. The plan said that a portion of the rancheria would be given to the American Baptist Home Mission Society as part of the land exchange done by the society and BIA. The distribution plan did not make any plans for improving the rancheria housing, water, sanitation, or irrigation.

The tribe approved the BIA's distribution plan without knowing their rights and obligations, advantages and disadvantages of agreeing with the termination, or other options they could have taken. After the approval of the distribution plan by Big Sandy members, the BIA revoked their status with the federal government. The BIA never fulfilled the rest of the agreements of the Rancheria Act other than preparing the distribution plan itself. The rancheria was terminated and its members were ineligible for federal services provided by the BIA. The termination of the rancheria was damaging and had a big impact on the social and economic development of the tribe. During their termination the federal government was providing programs to directly assist the Indian tribes. During this time housing conditions, low income, high unemployment, alcohol and drug abuse, and low education attainment worsened. These problems are still seen today.

In 1983, the United States District Court Action officially restored the BSR as an Indian Country and the people of the tribe were once again federally recognized Indians. Members holding land in accordance with the BIA distribution plan were able to return their land to trust status whenever they wanted and also the Association's properties.

== Government and administration ==
Big Sandy Rancheria's tribal headquarters is located in Auberry, California. They are governed by a democratically elected, five-person tribal council. General Council meetings are the last Sunday of each quarter and Tribal Council meetings are held on the last Wednesday of each month.

As of 1958, the Auberry Band of the Mono people was called unahpaahtyh (who/that which is on the other side [of the San Joaquin River]) in the Mono language.

The tribal administration has three departments: Family Activities, Head Start, and Finance.

== Education ==
The ranchería is served by the Sierra Unified School District.

== Economic development and enterprises ==
The tribe owns and operates the Mono Wind Casino and Broken Arrow Restaurant in Auberry.

They operate BSR Fuel Distribution in Auberry. They sell diesel and gasoline products.

BSR fuel distribution practices nation-to-nation trade and thus strengthens tribal relationships. It allows tribes and rancherias to buy fuel products and transact directly with one sovereign Native American government to another

Trading with other tribes helps Big Sandy Rancheria keep their tax revenue funds for their own reservation and people. The funds are used to help the community with programs such as healthcare/medical, elder care, native education programs, hardship funds, housing, and the tribal's infrastructure. The programs and services that Big Sandy Rancheria offers their tribal members are to help them grow and achieve self-sufficiency.

== See also ==
- Mono traditional narratives
- Mono language (Native American)
- Population of Native California
