= Advisory Council on California Indian Policy =

The Advisory Council on California Indian Policy (ACCIP) was created by an act of the United States Congress and signed by President George H. W. Bush on October 14, 1992. It provided for the creation of a special advisory council made up of eighteen members with the purpose of studying the unique problems that California Native Americans face in receiving federal acknowledgment. Additionally, they were given the task of studying the social and economic conditions of California natives, “characterized by, among other things, alcohol and substance abuse, critical health problems, family violence and child abuse, lack of educational and employment opportunities, and significant barriers to tribal economic development.” Under the provisions for the act, the Advisory Council was to make recommendations regarding California Indian policy to the Congress and the Departments of the Interior and of Health and Human Services.

== Federal Acknowledgment Process ==
The ACCIP was especially important as an advocate for California's terminated and unacknowledged tribes in receiving federal acknowledgment. In 1978, the Secretary of the Interior established the Federal Acknowledgment Process (FAP) to consider the extension of federal recognition to previously unrecognized Indian groups. Among other things, the Federal Acknowledgment regulations required that the group petitioning for a federally recognized tribal status live in a distinct community, be identified as an Indian entity on a continuous basis, and prove its political influence over its members through its history and into the present day. The UCLA American Indian Studies Center compiled a report for the ACCIP in 1996 which argued that the historical conditions of California Indians rendered the FAP regulations inapplicable to them. The Federated Indians of Graton Rancheria made the same argument:

This standard may reflect the historical realities of many tribes outside of California such as the Navajo or Sioux Nations and is therefore arguably a reasonable benchmark to apply to currently unrecognized Indian tribes seeking recognition ... Such a requirement is not, however, a realistic standard for California tribes because of California’s unique and tragic history toward its Native population. As California tribes were split apart, survival, not governance, became the primary goal of the Coast Miwok, the Southern Pomo, and others ...

The UCLA American Indian Studies Center explains that before the United States acquired California in aftermath of the Mexican–American War, "the mission system significantly disrupted tribal living patterns and populations in California." After California became a state, the United States concluded a total of eighteen treaties with the tribal groups of California in which a total of 8,500,000 acres (34,000 km^{2}) of land was to be set aside for them. The treaties were never ratified, however, and many Indians were resettled onto small reservations or rancherias, while others continued to live on their ancestral homelands without federal protection.

As the American Indian Studies Center Report points out, the United States had, in making treaties with the California Indian tribes, federally recognized them. They should not, therefore, have been subject to the Federal Acknowledgment Process. Furthermore, the missionary past of these Indians and the reservation system of the United States caused tribal groups to become broken up and isolated from one another. These cumulative experiences made federal acknowledgment under the FAP regulations especially difficult for California's tribal groups. The ACCIP was created for precisely this reason. However, as Francis Paul Prucha has pointed out, "President Bush signed the bill ... 'on the understanding that the Council will serve only in an advisory capacity.'" The powers of the ACCIP were extended in the Advisory Council on California Indian Policy Act of 1998 "to allow the Advisory Council to advise Congress on the implementation of the proposals and recommendations of the Advisory Council," but its influence on California Indian Policy was still limited. The council has, therefore, had mixed success in helping California Indian tribes achieve federal recognition.

== Efforts of the ACCIP ==
The Muwekma Ohlone Tribe of the San Francisco Bay Area is one of the tribes that was unable to achieve federal recognition, despite the assistance they received from the ACCIP and their own rigorous efforts. On September 9, 2002, the Bureau of Indian Affairs issued its Final Determination declining to acknowledge the Muwekma Ohlone Tribe on the grounds that it failed to meet three of the seven criteria laid out in the FAP regulations. One of the criterion that the BIA determined the Muwekma Ohlone failed to meet was the requirement that,

the petitioner to have maintained political authority or influence on a substantially continuous basis from historical times until the present. The Assistant Secretary determined that the petitioner did not meet the requirements of Section 83.8(d)(3) and that it did not demonstrate that it has maintained "political influence or authority" over its members since 1927, and thus does not meet the requirements of criterion 83.7(c).

The arguments BIA made against recognizing the Muwekma Ohlone have been contested by the tribe, but even without the evidence that the tribe has put forth contradicting BIA's claims, the Final Determination completely fails to acknowledge the unique historical circumstances that prevented the Indians of California like the Muwekma Ohlone from conforming to the rigid criteria of the FAP.

The ACCIP has had some success in assisting California Indian Tribes achieve federal recognition. On December 27, 2000, President Clinton signed legislation restoring federal recognition to the Federated Indians of Graton Rancheria on the recommendation of the ACCIP. The Graton Rancheria Tribe was one of many that was terminated by Congress in 1958. The “Termination Era” lasted from the late 1940s to the early 1960s and ended during the Nixon administration, largely the result of Indian activism and widespread opposition to the policy. In 1970, Nixon condemned the policy of termination and advocated the new policy of “Self-Determination” in a special message to Congress on Indian Affairs. Many of the terminated tribes managed to be restored through various channels, but California Indians faced special difficulties. With its access to Congress, the ACCIP made the recommendation that helped the Graton Rancheria gain recognition.

== Importance of recognition ==
Federal acknowledgment of the tribes is of critical importance because it is directly related to the other problems that the ACCIP was tasked with addressing, namely the “continuing social and economic crisis” of California Indians. As the report by the UCLA American Indian Studies Center to the ACCIP explains, “In most cases, unrecognized tribes receive no funding at all from the federal government.” Lack of recognition prevents tribes from getting access to the funding needed for programs to lower poverty levels by improving education and employment opportunities. It also places obstacles in the way of improving health care. Finally, tribes without recognition are restricted in their ability to preserve their cultural heritage in such matters as the protection of sacred sites. The Advisory Council on California Indian Policy Extension Act of 1998 extended the life of the council to March 31, 2000, but for many tribes the struggle for recognition continues.
