= Susan Billy =

Native American Pomo basket weaver

Susan Billy (born April 27, 1951) is a Native American Pomo basket weaver from the Hopland Band Pomo Indians of Northern California.

== Life ==
Billy was born in Hot Springs, South Dakota in 1951. She owns and operates Bead Fever, a bead store in Ukiah, CA. She is the granddaughter of Pomo basket weaver Susan Santiago Billy. She grew up outside of Washington D.C. in Virginia, where her father worked for the Veterans Administration. In 1973, Billy moved to California and soon after located to Ukiah, California, where she studied Pomo basket weaving under her great-aunt Elsie Allen for 15 years. In that time, Billy became familiar with the dozen shapes and almost 300 patterns traditionally used in Pomo basketry.

Allen had hoped to pass on her basket-weaving knowledge but had thought no young people were interested until Billy arrived. She had grown up with several baskets by her grandmother Susan Santiago Billy which occupied a place of reverence during her childhood but she never thought at the time she would be a weaver. By the time she showed interest in basket weaving, her grandmother had died. Billy received her grandmother's basket-making tools from Allen.

In 1990 Billy began her research for a 1994 exhibition, “Remember your Relations: The Elsie Allen Baskets and Family” which showed at the Grace Hudson Museum in Ukiah, California, and at the Oakland Museum of California, where she was a guest curator for the show and a coauthor of the book by the same name. Billy has curated collections at a number of museums, including the American Museum of Natural History, the Brooklyn Museum, the De Young Museum, the Mendocino County Museum, the National Museum of the American Indian, and the National Museum of Natural History.

== Exhibits ==
- Hearts of Our People: Native Women Artists, (2019), Minneapolis Institute of Art, Minneapolis, Minnesota, United States.
