= Wilton Rancheria =

Native American tribe

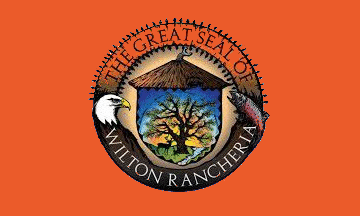

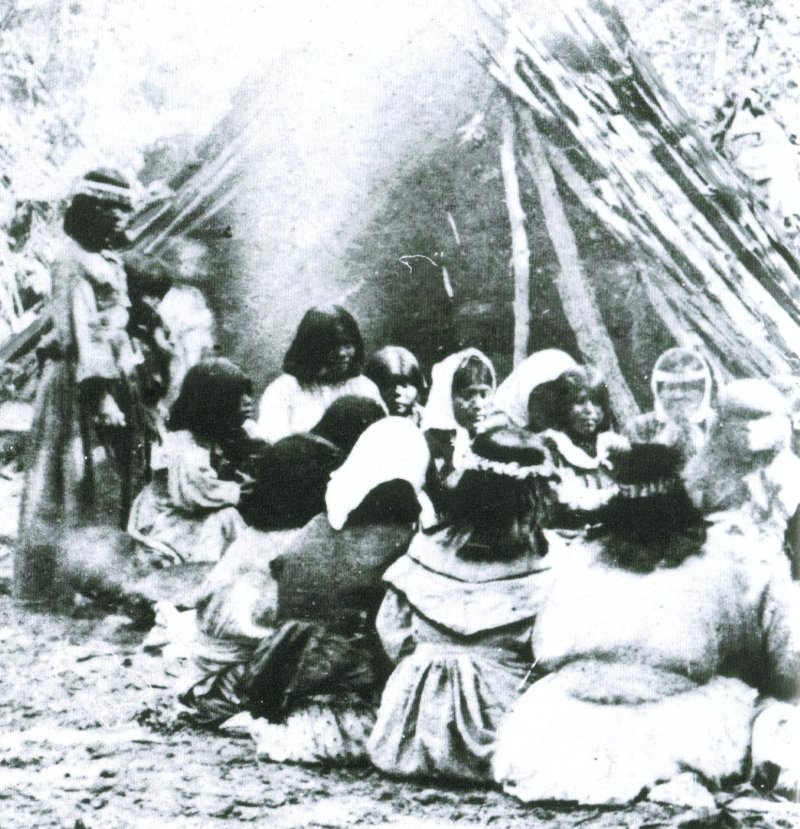
- Miwok-Paiute ceremony in 1872 at current site of Yosemite Lodge

Total population
- 700+ (enrolled members)

Regions with significant populations
- United States (California)

Languages
- English, historically Central Sierra Miwok language

Related ethnic groups
- other Miwok tribes

Wilton Rancheria is a federally recognized Native American tribe of Miwok people based in northern California. They were formed from Wilton Rancheria Miwok and the Me-Wuk Indian Community of the Wilton Rancheria. It regained recognition in 2009.

The Wilton Rancheria has more than 900 enrolled members; 62% of the enrolled population resides in Southern Sacramento County. The rancheria (or reservation) consists of 38.5 acres (156,000 m^{2}) of land located in the Sacramento Valley, near the city of Elk Grove in the community of Wilton. It was put in trust for the tribe by the Department of Interior, Bureau of Indian Affairs, as at the time the tribe was landless.

== Government ==
The tribe is headquartered in Elk Grove, California. The tribe has nine elected tribal officials.

Under its constitution, it has four branches of government, the Executive Branch, Legislative Branch, and Judicial Branch, and the General Council. Each play an important role in how the Tribe is run and the governing laws and rules are decided. The general council consists of all eligible voters of the Wilton Rancheria Tribe. Meetings of the general council are usually held annually or whenever one is needed.

The current elected officials are as follows:

- Chair: Jesus Tarango
- Vice Chair: Raquel Williams
- Tribal Council Spokesperson: Kevin Singh
- Tribal Council Vice Spokesperson: Spencer Hodson
- Tribal Council Members: Antonio Ruiz, Annette Williams, Jay Williams, Leia Ahuactzin, Marea Flores (These comprise the legislative branch.)

=== Branches of government ===
The Wilton Rancheria Tribe has four branches of government, which are the: Executive Branch, Legislative Branch, Judicial Branch, and the General Council. Each of which are responsible for different aspects of the tribe.

The Executive Branch is responsible for proposing legislation and annual tribal budget to the Legislative Branch and negotiating and entering into treaties. This branch is headed by the chairperson and the vice-chairperson.

The Legislative Branch is responsible for making laws and regulations, authorizing expenditures, and promoting social advancement of the tribe as a whole. The members of the tribal council serve in staggered four-year terms.

The Judicial Branch acts as the tribe's Tribal Court, which is responsible for jurisdiction over all criminal and civil cases. The Chief Judge of the Wilton Rancheria Tribal Court is yet to be TBD.

The General Council consists of all the eligible voters of Wilton Rancheria. The General Council is able to propose amendments to the Constitution, approve them, and remove tribal officials.

== History ==
For many years, ancestors of the Wilton Rancheria Miwok lived along the Cosumnes River until 1958. The tribal members are descendants of the Plains and Sierra Miwok, who lived and prospered in the Sacramento Valley long before encountering European explorers and colonists. In their own language, mi-wuk means "people".

Between March 1851 and January 1852, three commissioners negotiated eighteen treaties with representatives of some of the indigenous population in California. These were never ratified by the Senate, as required to have the force of law, nor were they even discussed in Congress, according to available records. The documentation was hidden for more than 50 years.

The tribe's status was terminated in 1958 under the California Rancheria Act, at a time when the federal government believed that assimilation of Native American tribes was the best policy. It passed legislation to terminate the federal status under its Indian termination policy of several tribes within the boundaries of the United States.

After termination in 1958, the Wilton Rancheria Tribe suffered long-term adverse effects, such as a: 62% unemployment rate, median annual income of $20,000, 38% without health insurance, and a college graduation rate of 14%.

In the 1970s, the policy of termination was reconsidered by President Richard M. Nixon and Congress, which began to favor Indian self-determination. In part this was due to widespread Native American activism stressing their assertion of sovereignty and seeking more control over their affairs.

In the 1990s the Wilton Rancheris reorganized their government and officially requested the US to formally restore their federal recognition. They sued in court, receiving a ruling in 2009 from the US District Court Judge. Based on the documentation of evidence of longstanding federal recognition, due to multiple treaties negotiated with its representatives in the 19th century, the tribe had its federal recognition restored on June 13, 2009.

The tribe developed and passed a constitution in 2011, to create the basis for an elected government with four branches. They set up the framework for a structural government. The Federal Register, Vol. 78, No. 176, Notices 55731, states that the Tribe had designated boundaries of the Service Delivery Area (SDA) of Sacramento County, California.

The Tribe has enrolled numerous members, and a 36-acre portion of land for its reservation was taken into trust by the federal government, to restore some portion of its previous land. It planned to develop the Wilton Rancheria Elk Grove Resort and Casino on this land, to generate revenue for tribal welfare and education, and won a ruling in its favor by the courts to enable it to do so. It also seeks to attract customers and visitors.

The Sky River Casino opened in 2022, with a 110,200 square-foot gaming floor, and is expected to generate more than $100 million for the community in the subsequent 20 years. As of 2025, the Sky River Casino employed 1,600 people, making it one of the largest employers in the City of Elk Grove.

In November 2024, the Tribe purchased a majority ownership stake of Sacramento Republic FC, becoming the first Native American Nation to hold majority ownership of a men's professional sports team.

== See also ==
- Yosemite National Park
