= Mono Wind Casino =

Casino in Auberry, California

Coordinates: 37°5′5.51″N 119°27′52.57″W

- Interactive map of Mono Wind Casino
- Location: 37302 Rancheria Lane Auberry, California 93602-1060
- Gaming space: 10,000 sq ft (930 m^{2})
- Notable restaurants: The Broken Arrow
- Owner: Big Sandy Rancheria of Mono Indians
- Website: http://www.monowind.com/

The Mono Wind Casino is a small casino located near Auberry, California.

The casino is owned operated by the Big Sandy Rancheria Band of Western Mono Indians. Mono Wind features slot machines and the Broken Arrow Restaurant. The casino is open 24 hours a day.

== History ==
The tribe entered into a compact with the State of California in 1998 which allowed them to operate a gambling facility. The Mono Wind Casino was built shortly after.

Mono Wind was shut down in 2005 by Fresno County Sheriff Deputies in order to collect $700,000 from a court judgment. The casino re-opened after an agreement was reached.

The tribe has developed plans for opening a second casino site, but the project has not moved beyond the proposal stage.

During the outbreak of COVID-19, Mono Wind suspended casino operations on March 24, 2020, days after other Central Valley area casinos also closed. The facility remained open for gas and to-go food orders. The gambling floor re-opened on June 2, 2020, with safety modifications.

The casino was put under an evacuation warning due to the Creek Fire (2020).

== See also ==
- List of casinos in California
