= South Park, Santa Rosa, California =

Coordinates: 38.4284°N 122.7080°W

South Park is residential neighborhood in the city of Santa Rosa, California. It is located in south Santa Rosa, east of U.S. Highway 101, south of Bennett Valley Road, west of the Sonoma County Fairgrounds, and encompasses 60 blocks. The community is known for its old houses and artistic murals in the area, and notorious for its history of an above average crime rate and gang activity. South Park was also once a settlement for African Americans during the mid-1900s and was a center of Santa Rosa's Black community. Today, the neighborhood is mainly Latino. It has around 1,500 residents.

== History ==
Originally an Italian and German community, South Park became a popular settlement for African Americans relocating from the South after World War II in the late 1940s, and was considered by some locals to be the "black neighborhood" of Santa Rosa. A chapter of NAACP was founded and a black church was established during this time in the area, known as the Community Baptist Church. It was damaged in a suspected arson in the 1980s, and it was later moved to Sonoma Avenue.

In 1990, 17% percent of South Park's residents were Black, and 51% of them White, and 21% of them Hispanic. In the 2000s, South Park became increasingly and predominately Hispanic. Refugees from African countries, mainly Ethiopia and Eritrea also settled in the neighborhood during the 1980s and 1990s, as well as with northwest Santa Rosa.

== Crime ==
The South Park neighborhood, along with West Ninth, Roseland and Apple Valley West Steele Lane Area in the northwest and southwest Santa Rosa, has dealt with a higher-than-average rate of crime in comparison to other neighborhoods in Santa Rosa. South Park's gangs were generally of Mexican American ethnicity, namely Nortenos and Surenos. Drive-by shootings have been a common form of violence in the neighborhood, especially when conflicts between rival gangs intensify.

== Features ==
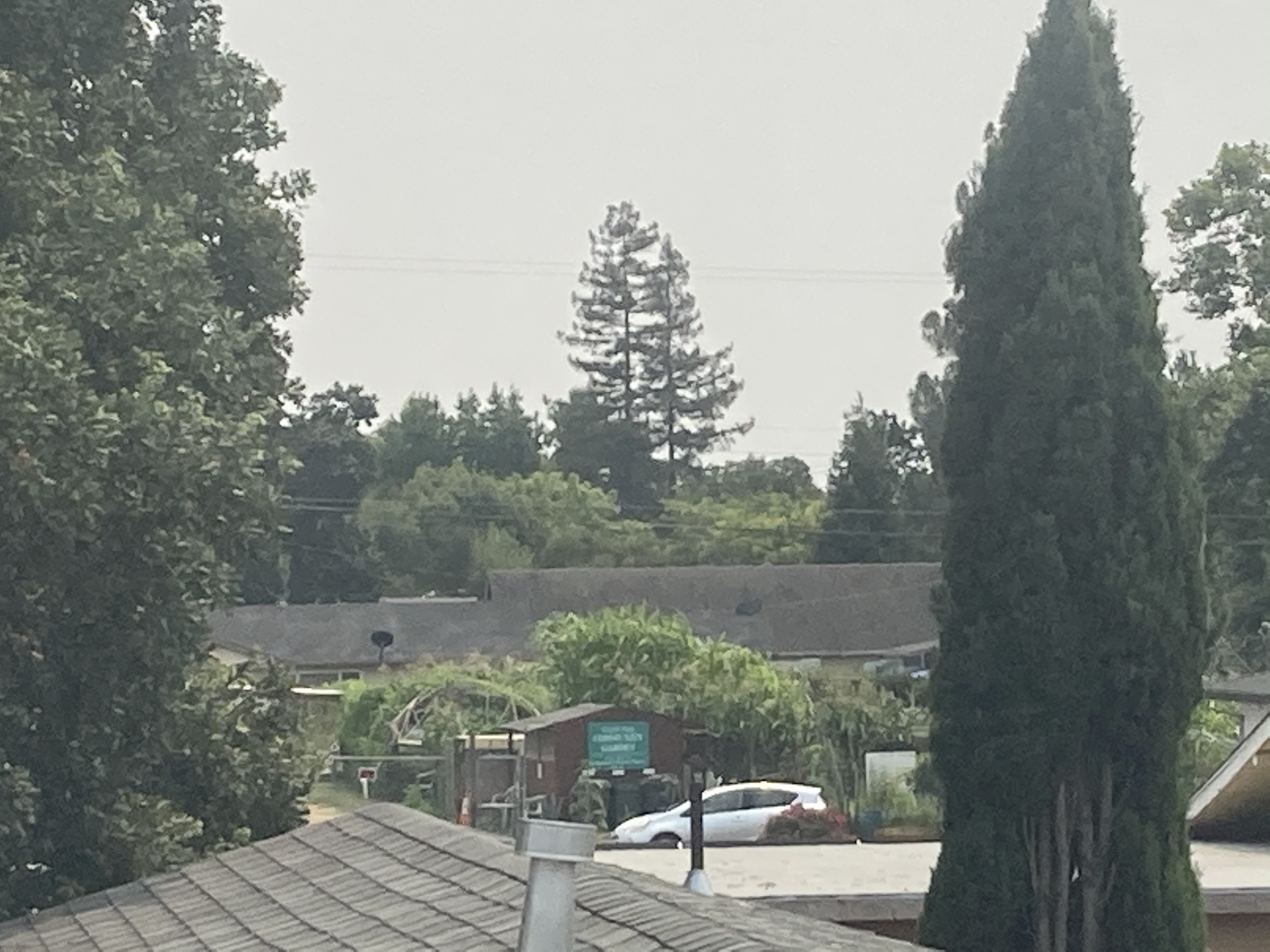
South Park Community Garden, from an apartment deck view

South Park along with West Ninth Street was home to American rapper Ray Luv. South Park also contains a Boys & Girls Clubs of America, Martin Luther King, Jr. Park, and two churches. It is situated southwest of the Sonoma County Fairgrounds. There is a community garden in the center of the park.

The edges of South Park contain stores like an Asian market, another nearby, Mexican market, and close to a Mexican supermarket, Lola's. There are a few restaurants in the area. A tire and hat shop are in Petaluma Hill Road in the neighborhood, as well as a cannabis store and art/dance studio. The Sonoma County Chapter of the Hells Angels clubhouse is located just beyond Petaluma Hill Rd on Frazier Ave.

Most homes are houses, some in Victorian or old British styled homes. There are apartment complexes and duplexes. Most are older, built before 1960, but there are some new developments especially on the outer edges of the neighborhood by Temple Avenue.

== Films ==
A movie about a Native American family moving from a reservation, Grand Avenue, is based on the Grand Avenue in South Park. It is however mostly shot in other areas of Santa Rosa even if it is in a scene set in the exact neighborhood. It was written and produced by Santa Rosan Greg Sarris.
