= Buena Vista, Amador County, California =

Buena Vista әpәsani (Northern Sierra Miwok)
- census-designated place
- Location in California
- Coordinates: 38°17′40″N 120°54′48″W
- Country: United States
- State: California
- County: Amador

Area
  - Total: 1.69 sq mi (4.37 km^{2})
  - Land: 1.69 sq mi (4.37 km^{2})
  - Water: 0 sq mi (0.00 km^{2}) 0%
- Elevation: 300 ft (90 m)

Population (2020)
  - Total: 542
  - Density: 320/sq mi (124/km^{2})
- FIPS code: 06-08828
- GNIS feature IDs: 252642, 2582953

Buena Vista (Spanish for "Good View"; Northern Sierra Miwok: әpәsani) is a census-designated place in Amador County, California, United States. It lies at an elevation of 295 feet (90 m). It is located 4 miles (6.4 km) south-southeast of Ione, at 38°17′40″N 120°54′48″W. The community is served by ZIP code 95640 and area code 209. The population was 542 at the 2020 census.

== History ==
A post office operated at Buena Vista from 1866 to 1878. It was briefly known as The Corners.

== Current situation ==
Buena Vista is located near 67-acre Miwok Indian rancheria called the Buena Vista Rancheria. The rancheria is administered by the Buena Vista Rancheria of Me-Wuk Indians, a federally recognized tribe, whose tribal chairperson is Pope Rhonda Morningstar.

== Demographics ==
Historical population
Census	Pop.	Note	%±
2010	429		—
2020	542		26.3%
U.S. Decennial Census; 1860–1870 1880-1890; 1900 1910 1920; 1930 1940 1950; 1960 1970 1980; 1990 2000 2010; 2020

Buena Vista first appeared as a census designated place in the 2010 U.S. census.

The 2020 United States census reported that Buena Vista had a population of 542. The population density was 321.1 inhabitants per square mile (124.0/km^{2}). The racial makeup of Buena Vista was 71.8% White, 0.7% African American, 4.2% Native American, 0.6% Asian, 0.2% Pacific Islander, 7.9% from other races, and 14.6% from two or more races. Hispanic or Latino of any race were 18.3% of the population.

There were 212 households, out of which 23.6% included children under the age of 18, 43.4% were married-couple households, 11.8% were cohabiting couple households, 25.0% had a female householder with no partner present, and 19.8% had a male householder with no partner present. 26.9% of households were one person, and 13.2% were one person aged 65 or older. The average household size was 2.56. There were 139 families (65.6% of all households).

The age distribution was 23.4% under the age of 18, 8.3% aged 18 to 24, 20.7% aged 25 to 44, 28.8% aged 45 to 64, and 18.8% who were 65 years of age or older. The median age was 41.3 years. For every 100 females, there were 110.1 males.

There were 233 housing units at an average density of 138.0 units per square mile (53.3 units/km^{2}), of which 212 (91.0%) were occupied. Of these, 83.0% were owner-occupied, and 17.0% were occupied by renters.

== Politics ==
In the state legislature, Buena Vista is in the 4th senatorial district, represented by Republican Marie Alvarado-Gil, and the 1st Assembly district, represented by Republican Heather Hadwick. Federally, Buena Vista is in California's 5th congressional district, represented by Republican Tom McClintock.
