= Greenville Rancheria of Maidu Indians =

Coordinates: 40°08′56″N 120°53′36″W

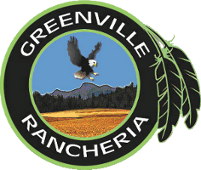

Total population
- 144 enrolled members, 22 rancheria population (2011)

Regions with significant populations
- United States (California)

Languages
- English, Maidu

Related ethnic groups
- other Maidu people

The Greenville Rancheria of Maidu Indians of California (Northeast Maidu: Kotassi) is a federally recognized tribe of Maidu people in Plumas and Tehama Counties, California.

== Reservation ==
Location of the Greenville Rancheria

The Greenville Rancheria is a federally recognized ranchería with an area of 51 acres (21 ha). It is located in Plumas County, just east of Greenville.

== History ==
The Greenville Rancheria was initially donated as a "safe-zone" for Indian people from Euro-American settlers in the late 1800s. This land contained a boarding school for Maidu and other Californian tribes from 1890 until 1920 when it was burned down. This land eventually adopted rancheria status and was held in trust by the federal government for the Maidu tribe.

In 1958 the tribe lost federal recognition and the land lost rancheria status due to the California Rancheria Act. Due to the removal act, many individuals lost their land and the Maidu Indian community of Greenville Rancheria was almost completely destroyed.

In the late 1970s, Greenville Rancheria and 16 other Indian tribes sued the federal government for illegally terminating the tribes and removing their land from trust status. The tribes' perseverance paid off when in 1983 the Tillie-Hardwick ruling was established. Because of this act, the tribes regained federal recognition and the original boundaries of Greenville Rancheria were restored. These boundaries were also labeled as "Indian Country".

More than half of the tribe moved to the City of Red Bluff in Tehama county so no lands are held in trust for the tribe. Because the tribe is spread out in two counties they struggled to establish a government after regaining federal recognition. In 1988 the tribe formally elected its first Tribal Council since regaining federal recognition. The tribe operates medical clinics providing healthcare to tribal members and low-income residents around the area.

== Government ==
Greenville Rancheria is headquartered in Greenville, California. The tribe is governed by a democratically elected, five-person tribal council. The current tribal administration is as follows.

- Chairperson: Kyle Self
- Vice chairwoman: Crystal Rios
- Secretary/Treasurer: Crystal Hank
- Tribal representative: Aaliyah Rios
- Tribal representative: Debra Self

The Tribal Council meets every other Wednesday in Red Bluff. In order to conduct elections the tribe has adopted an election ordinance that is consistent with the constitution.

== Cultural preservation ==
The Greenville Rancheria Cultural Department serves to protect sacred sites, tribal cultures, languages, customs, and beliefs. They conduct agricultural surveys with the Environmental Protection Agency Program to review culturally sensitive areas on development to the land. The department is also starting a native plant garden to provide food and medicine to Tribal members.

There is a long history of inappropriate treatment of Native American human remains and cultural objects. In order to protect from continued negligence the Native American Graves Protection and Repatriation Act (NAGPRA) was created. The Sierra Nevada NAGPRA Coalition (SNNC) recognizes that is solely the tribe's decision what do with human remains and cultural objects. In 2006 Greenville Rancheria was awarded a grant to facilitate training in the fundamentals of NAGPRA and organize a regional strategy in handling ancestral remains.

== Environmental protection ==
Greenville Rancheria has a Tribal Environmental Protection Agency which aims to protect all natural resources while allowing the environment to rebuild itself without man made hazards.

The environmental staff is also a part of the "Region 9 EPA Air Work Group" which works to maintain correct air quality in Greenville Rancheria. They work with the Plumas County Public Health Department to make sure that air quality is within acceptable ranges during projects that involve construction and ground disturbance.

Water quality tests are regularly made to maintain proper drinking water quality. The environmental staff attends trainings to stay updated on procedures for keeping the region's drinking water, surface water, and ground water safe.

In order to assure that Native American cultural and spiritual sites are protected, timber harvesting plans are reviewed by the environmental staff. Plans are also reviewed to make sure they won't affect water quality.

Map plotting and GIS data keeping is essential for the environmental staff to know where cultural sites, sensitive habitat areas and watercourses are located when reviewing project plans.

The tribe has been working for years on securing land for housing and membership. The current status of the land the tribe holds is 1 acre in Redding, 10 acres in Greenville, 15.5 acres in Red Bluff under fee status and 1.5 acres in Greenville under fee status for the medical and dental facilities.

== See also ==
- Indigenous peoples of California
