= Grand Avenue (film) =

- Based on: Grand Avenue by Greg Sarris
- Screenplay by: Greg Sarris
- Directed by: Daniel Sackheim
- Starring: Irene Bedard; Tantoo Cardinal; Eloy Casados; Deena-Marie Consiglio; Alexis Cruz; Diane Debassige; Jenny Gago; Cody Lightning; A Martinez; Simi Mehta; August Schellenberg; Sheila Tousey; Sam Vlahos
- Composer: Peter Rodgers Melnick
- Country of origin: United States
- Original language: English

Production
- Producer: Tony To
- Cinematography: James L. Carter
- Editor: Laurie Grotstein
- Running time: 207 minutes
- Production companies: HBO Pictures; Elsboy Entertainment; Wildwood Enterprises, Inc

Original release
- Network: HBO
- Release: June 30, 1996

Grand Avenue is a 1996 American drama film directed by Daniel Sackheim and written by Greg Sarris. It is based on the 1994 novel Grand Avenue by Greg Sarris. The film stars Irene Bedard, Tantoo Cardinal, Eloy Casados, Deena-Marie Consiglio, Alexis Cruz, Diane Debassige, Jenny Gago, Cody Lightning, A Martinez, Simi Mehta, August Schellenberg, Sheila Tousey and Sam Vlahos. The film premiered on HBO on June 30, 1996. The film is one of the only American films to feature an indigenous Native American lead role for an actress, played by Menominee actress Tousey.

== Plot ==
The film follows the members of a family who at the opening are kicked out of their stepfather's tribal reservation in California after he dies. They return to Grand Avenue in the South Park neighborhood of Santa Rosa, California, where many of their extended relatives and tribal members live. Once they have a house for rent, Mollie, the mother of the family struggles with finding and keeping a job and alcoholism. Daughters Justine and Alice try to keep the family together and take care of the youngest, their brother Sheldon. However, Justine begins to seek out company with local gang members, some of whom then turn on her for acting out sexually with their friends. Alice is the lone dependable member of the family and gravitates to her elder relatives for advice and support.

Nellie is an old cousin who begins to teach Alice about traditional basket weaving and healing, giving her a boost of confidence. Nellie is also an advocate for the tribe's only land holding, a cemetery in danger of being developed. Her nephew Steven is married to Reyna and they live a nice suburban life with his son Raymond, who upon meeting her in school, is attracted to Justine. Steven slowly begins to realize that Mollie may have kept a secret from him when they dated as teenagers and after she moved away, as Raymond begins to bring Justine around.

Meanwhile, Justine also befriends and becomes close to her cousin Jeanne, who is struggling with cancer and taken care of by her loving mother Anna. After being confronted by her kids, Mollie begins to work on her sobriety and eventually meets and begins a positive relationship with a fellow recovering alcoholic named Sherman. Nellie and Steven are able to gain support from tribal members to save the cemetery. Although Jeanne warns Justine about running around, she eventually meets a bad fate, but the family has worked to build up their support and the community as a whole is able to deal with the grief and accept the beauty of living in Grand Avenue.

== Cast ==
- Irene Bedard as Reyna
- Tantoo Cardinal as Nellie
- Eloy Casados as Albert
- Deena-Marie Consiglio as Justine
- Alexis Cruz as Raymond
- Diane Debassige as Alice
- Jenny Gago as Anna
- Cody Lightning as Sheldon
- A Martinez as Steven
- Simi Mehta as Jeanne
- August Schellenberg as Sherman
- Sheila Tousey as Mollie
- Sam Vlahos as Henry
- Carmen Ahern as Evangeline
- Delmar Billy as Delmar
- Rita Carillo as Mona Bill
- Patricia Garcia as Maria
- Susan Harloe as Chair
- Shar Jackson as Carlene
- Laurel Keith as Mrs. Anders
- Ron Kenoly as Dennis
- Jack Kohler as Rick
- Zahn McClarnon as Eric
- Miguel Nájera as Clifford
- Bruce Roberts as Dr. Parker
- Anita Silva as Lena Bill
- Norris Young as Kolvey
- Daniel Zacapa as Carlos

== Awards ==
Earned the Best Picture at the 1996 American Indian Film Festival.
