= Susan Santiago Billy =

Native American Pomo basket weaver

Susan Santiago Billy (born Andrea Susan Santiago; October 5, 1884 – November 20, 1968) was a Native American Pomo basket weaver from the Hopland Band Pomo Indians of California in Northern California. Her parents were Silva Santiago and Tudy Marie Arnold.

In 1900, she married Cruz Billy, a leader at the Hopland Rancheria. Her granddaughter is artist Susan Billy who was inspired by her grandmother to learn the art of Pomo basketry and later studied under her great-aunt Elsie Allen for 15 years until her aunt's death in 1990. She was an curator, speaker and demonstrator at many cultural events of her home community.
