= Greg Sarris =

American novelist

Gregory Sarris
- Sarris in a meeting with Barbara Boxer.

Chairman of the Federated Indians of Graton Rancheria
- Incumbent
- Assumed office 1992

Personal details
- Born: February 12, 1952 (age 74) Santa Rosa, California, U.S.
- Education: University of California, Los Angeles (BA); Stanford University (MA, PhD)

Gregory Michael Sarris (born February 12, 1952) is the Chairman of the Federated Indians of Graton Rancheria (since 1992) and the recent chair of the Board of Trustees of the Smithsonian's National Museum of the American Indian. Until 2022, Sarris was the Graton Rancheria Endowed Chair in Creative Writing and Native American Studies at Sonoma State University, where he taught classes in Native American Literature, American Literature, and Creative Writing. He is also President of the Graton Economic Development Authority. Sarris is currently the Distinguished Chair Emeritus at Sonoma State University. He was appointed as a UC Regent by Governor Gavin Newsom in 2023.

A notable scholar and activist, Sarris was elected to the American Academy of Arts and Sciences in 2020. Sarris has authored six books, including Grand Avenue, a collection of autobiographical short stories about contemporary Native American life. Named after a real place in Santa Rosa's South Park district, Sarris was a co-executive producer, along with Robert Redford, of a two-part 1996 HBO miniseries adaptation, shot entirely on location. He currently serves on the Board of Trustees of the Sundance Institute.

== Childhood ==
Greg Sarris was born in Santa Rosa, California. He was adopted shortly after his birth by a middle-class white couple, George and Mary Sarris, who believed they could not have children. Shortly after, they conceived the first of three biological children, which complicated life at home with his alcoholic father. Sarris was frequently the target of his father's abuse. In an effort to keep him out of harm's way, he was sent to live with various white and American Indian foster families. At the age of 12, Sarris met Pomo basket weaver Mabel McKay, who taught him about American Indian customs and tradition. According to Sarris, McKay's guidance provided him with a sense of purpose.

== Education ==
After graduating from Santa Rosa High School in 1970, Sarris attended Santa Rosa Junior College. In 1977 he graduated summa cum laude with a BA in English from UCLA. He went on to complete his graduate studies at Stanford University, earning a master's degree in creative writing in 1981 and a Ph.D. in Modern Thought and Literature in 1989. Sarris received an honorary Doctor of Humane Letters (LHD) degree from Sonoma State University in June 2024.

== Ancestry ==
According to his website, Greg Sarris' mother, seventeen year old Mary Bernadette "Bunny" Hartman, of German, Jewish and Irish descent, came from a wealthy family. She was sent to Santa Rosa to deliver her child, which was not uncommon for unwed mothers at the time. She was inadvertently given the wrong blood type in a transfusion after giving birth, and died shortly thereafter. Sarris’ father was not named on the birth certificate. It wasn't until the early 1980s as a graduate student at Stanford that Sarris said he learned that Emilio Arthur Hilario, of Filipino, Miwok and Pomo descent, was his biological father. According to Sarris, he learned the identity of his great-great-grandparents from his grandfather, Emiliano Hilario. Hilario's grandmother, Reinette Smith Sarragossa, was the daughter of Emily Stewart, a woman of mixed blood ancestry, and Tom Smith, a well-known healer of Pomo and Coastal Miwok blood.

=== Dispute of ancestry ===
In 2010, an anti-casino group sent a letter to the U.S. Bureau of Indian Affairs stating Sarris had no Native American ancestry. The letter references genealogical and census records they say demonstrate he is only of white, Mexican, Filipino, and Black ancestry. Anti-casino activist Marilee Montgomery said Greg's mother said his father had been Mexican. She said it was not possible for him to be Native American through his father, Emilio Hilario, as he claimed.

Multiple outlets have alleged Sarris does not possess Native American ancestry. The Muwekma Ohlone tribe's newspaper states he has been accused of Indigenous identity fraud. In 2023, the Capitol Weekly wrote there was no proof Hilario was his father. They also quoted one of Hilario's relatives, who said she did not get any Native American ancestry on her DNA test. In the book Wampum, Donald Craig Mitchell, the former VP of the Alaska Federation of Natives, says that Sarris is not Native American. Mitchell writes that one of Reinette Sarragossa's descendants had her DNA tested, and the results indicated she had been of African ancestry alone, rather than Native American.

== Activism ==
In the early 1990s, Sarris worked to have the Coast Miwok and Pomo Native Americans gain recognition as a tribe. He co-authored the Graton Rancheria Restoration Act, 25 U.S.C. §1300n (Act) with California Indian Legal Services. President Clinton signed the Act into law on December 27, 2000, officially granting the tribe status as a federally recognized tribe. The Act mandated that the Secretary of the Interior take land in the tribe's aboriginal territory of Marin or Sonoma Counties into trust as the Tribe's reservation.

== Career ==
- 1989-2001 English professor, UCLA.
- Writer in residence, PEN Program
- Scholar in residence, Santa Rosa Junior College, 1996
- Writer in residence, Dallas College, 1997
- Adlai Stevenson Scholar in Residence. Stevenson College. UC Santa Cruz. 1997
- Writer in Residence. Humboldt State University. 1997
- 2001-2005 Fletcher Jones Professor of Creative Writing and Literature at Loyola Marymount University.
- Writer in Residence. Stanford University. January 2003.
- Writer in Residence. Syracuse University. October 2002.
- Endowed Chair in Native American Studies, Sonoma State University, 2005.
- Consultant for Turner Broadcasting System on California Indians.
- Tribal Chairman of the Federated Indians of Graton Rancheria. 1992–Present. He is in his seventeenth elected term as Chairman of the Tribe.
- Board Chair of the Smithsonian National Museum of the American Indian 2024
- Member of the UC Board of Regents
- Appointed to Sundance Institute's Board of Trustees in June 2025
- Reappointed to UC Board of Regents March 2026

== Published works ==
Novels

- Watermelon Nights: A Novel, Hyperion (New York, NY), 1998; reissued 2021, University of Oklahoma Press.

Short story collections

- The Last Human Bear, Heyday (Berkeley, CA), releases June 2026.
- How A Mountain Was Made, Heyday (Berkeley, CA), 2017.
- Grand Avenue, Hyperion (New York, NY), 1994.
- (Editor and contributor) The Sound of Rattles and Clappers: A Collection of New California Indian Writing, University of Arizona Press (Tucson, AZ), 1994.
- Becoming Story, Heyday Books (Berkeley, CA) 2022
- The Forgetters: Stories, Heyday Books (Berkeley, CA), 2024

Nonfiction

- Keeping Slug Woman Alive: A Holistic Approach to American Indian Texts, University of California Press (Berkeley, CA), 1993.
- Mabel McKay: Weaving the Dream, University of California Press (Berkeley, CA), 1994.
- (Editor, with Connie A. Jacobs and James R. Giles) Approaches to Teaching the Works of Louise Erdrich, Modern Language Association of America (New York, NY), 2004.

Film and Theater

- Grand Avenue (television miniseries; based on his short story collection), Home Box Office, 1996.
- Best Picture. Grand Avenue. London Native American Film Festival. July 1998
- Best Screenplay nomination, Grand Avenue, London Native American Film Festival.
- Best Screenplay. Outstanding Achievement in Writing. Grand Avenue. First Americans in the Arts.
- Best Picture. Grand Avenue. First Americans in the Arts. 1997.
- Cable-Ace Nomination. Grand Avenue. Best Editing. 1997.
- Producer's Award. Grand Avenue. First Americans in the Arts. 1997.
- Emmy Nomination. Grand Avenue. Best Casting. 1997.
- Best Story. Grand Avenue. American Indian Film Festival. 1996.
- Best Picture. Grand Avenue. American Indian Film Festival. 1996.
- Best Screenplay. Grand Avenue. Native American Film Exposition. 1996.
- Best Picture (tie). Grand Avenue. Native American Film Exposition. 1996.
- Wrote script for Mission Indians , a play directed by Nancy Benjamin and Margo Hall, 2001.
- Co-produced, advised, and was featured in a sixteen part series on American literature for public television called American Passages.
- Word for Word produced the play Citizen, based on Sarris' story in 2023. It was praised by the San Francisco Chronicle as "as lush and as penetrating as a Sonoma County grapevine."
- Word for Word's production of Citizen was nominated for two San Francisco Bay Area Theater Critics Circle awards.

== Awards and achievements ==
- Fred W. Schuster and Margaret C. Schuster Distinguished Visiting Lectureship in Literature — Carleton College, April 2026
- AFP National Philanthropy Day Outstanding Grantmaker Award, November 2024
- Asian American Pacific Islander Legislative Caucus Heritage Month Honoree, May 2024
- EqualityCA Community Leadership Award 2024
- Induction to the American Academy of Arts and Sciences
- Los Angeles Equality Awards, Community Leadership Award, Los Angeles, October 2024.
- Arts & Humanities Dean's Teaching Award, Sonoma State University
- Sonoma County Democratic Party Trowbridge Lifetime Achievement Award, February 2024
- University of Utah Award in the Environmental Humanities, September 2023
- San Francisco Gay Men's Chorus Visionary Award. April 2023
- Sonoma State University Distinguished Chair Emeritus Award. August 2022.
- North Bay Business Journal's Pride Business Leadership Award. May 2021.
- Heyday Lifetime Achievement Award. October 2020.
- Santa Fe Film Festival Award, best screenplay, and American Indian Film Festival Award, 1996, for Grand Avenue;
- Hugo Award for Best Documentary. American Passages. 2003.
- Best Reads Award, California Indian Booksellers, 1996;
- California Indian Writer of the Year from the 15th Annual California Indian Conference. October 2000.
- Certificate of Recognition for 2018 Sonoma County Conservation Action Dick Day Community Activist Award. June 2018.
- California Independent Booksellers Award. Best Read. Fiction. Grand Avenue. 1997.
- Western Business Alliance LGBT Economic Summit, Honoring 2017 Fire Relief Efforts, San Francisco, California. March 2018.
- Bay Area Theater Critics Award, best play, 2002, for Mission Indians.
- Walter J. Gores Award for Excellence in Teaching, 1988–1989
- Distinguished Alumnus Award. Santa Rosa Junior College.
- Greg Sarris Scholarship Fund (for Native American Students). Santa Rosa Junior College
- University of California President's Postdoctoral Fellowship 1989–1991
- Independent Publisher Book Bronze Award for How a Mountain Was Made. April 2019.
- North Bay Business Journal 2018 Community Philanthropy Awards. Santa Rosa, California. March 2018.
- Associate Director of the UCLA American Indian Studies Center, 1991–1992.
- Appointed to the MLA Committee on the Literatures and Languages of America, 1992.
- Award for Outstanding Service from California Indian Legal Services. September 25, 1998.
- Humanitarian Award. Santa Rosa Chamber of Commerce 1996.
- “I Made a Difference Award”, Sunday Best, Gray Foundation. Santa Rosa, California. September 2013.
- “Working Class Hero Award”, North Bay Labor Council, AFL-CIO. December 2012.
- Sarris was awarded an honorary Doctor of Humane Letters degree from Sonoma State University in June 2024.
- Awarded Equity CA's Community Leadership Award in October 2024.

== See also ==
- List of writers from peoples indigenous to the Americas

== Bibliography ==
- Lincoln, Kenneth. "Greg Sarris." Native American Writers of the United States. Ed. Kenneth M. Roemer. Detroit: Gale, 1997. Dictionary of Literary Biography Vol. 175. Literature Resource Center. Web. 21 May 2016.
- "Greg Sarris." Contemporary Authors Online. Detroit: Gale, 2007. Literature Resource Center. Web. 28 May 2016.
- Wasp, Jean. World Class Author, Screenwriter Greg Sarris Named to Native American Endowed Chair at SSU. Sonoma State University News Center. April 8, 2005. Web. 28 May 2016.
- "Tribal Government" Graton Rancheria.n.p.n.d.Web.28 May 2016.
- greg-sarris.com. n.p. n.d. Web. 28 May 2016.
- Mason, Clark. Casino critic challenges tribal leader's Indian heritage . The Press Democrat. February 17, 2010. Web. 28 May 2016.
- Title XIV Graton Rancheria Restoration. uscode.house.gov. n.p. 27 Dec 2000. Web 28 May 2016.
- Federal Register Notice at 74 FR 40219. August 11, 2009. Web. 28 May 2016.
- Sarris, Greg. Mabel McKay: Weaving the Dream Berkeley: University of California Press, 1994. ISN 0-520-20968-0.
- Mitchell, Donald Craig (2016). Wampum: How Indian Tribes, the Mafia, and an Inattentive Congress Invented Indian Gaming and Created a $28 Billion Gambling Empire. New York, NY: The Overlook Press, Peter Mayer Publishers, Inc. ISBN 978-1-4683-0993-5.
