= Redwood Valley, California =

Census-designated place in the United States

Redwood Valley kat'il (Northern Pomo)
- Census-designated place
- Looking southwest into Redwood Valley

- Location within California Location within the United States
- Coordinates: 39°15′56″N 123°12′16″W
- Country: United States
- State: California
- County: Mendocino

Area
  - Total: 2.758 sq mi (7.14 km^{2})
  - Land: 2.746 sq mi (7.11 km^{2})
  - Water: 0.012 sq mi (0.031 km^{2}) 0.44%
- Elevation: 720 ft (220 m)

Population (2020)
  - Total: 1,843
  - Density: 1,738/sq mi (671.2/km^{2})
- Time zone: UTC-8 (PST)
  - Summer (DST): UTC-7 (PDT)
- ZIP code: 95470
- Area code: 707
- GNIS feature ID: 231454; 2628782

Redwood Valley (formerly Basil, Northern Pomo: kat'il) is a census-designated place (CDP) in Mendocino County, California, United States. It is located 9 miles (14 km) north of Ukiah, the county seat, at an elevation of 722 feet (220 m), and comprises the northern portion of the Ukiah Valley. It is about 15 miles (24 km) southeast of Willits. Potter Valley is to the east and Calpella to the south. The ZIP Code is 95470, and the community is in area code 707. The population of the CDP was 1,843 at the 2020 census.

== History ==
Redwood Valley was one of the areas where Black Bart operated. The place was called "Basil" by the railroad when it reached there; when the post office opened in 1920, the place was called "Redwood Valley".

Jim Jones' Peoples Temple was located in Redwood Valley for a short time. The site was chosen because Jones believed that it was one of the few places in the world likely to survive a nuclear holocaust.

The Redwood Valley Rancheria of Pomo Indians of California is located within the community.

== Geography ==
Redwood Valley is in eastern Mendocino County, at the headwaters of the West Fork of the Russian River. According to the United States Census Bureau, the CDP covers an area of 2.7 square miles (7.0 km^{2}), of which 99.56% is land and 0.44% is water.

== Demographics ==
Historical population
Census	Pop.	Note	%±
2010	1,729		—
2020	1,843		6.6%
U.S. Decennial Census; 1850–1870 1880-1890; 1900 1910 1920; 1930 1940 1950; 1960 1970 1980; 1990 2000 2010

Redwood Valley first appeared as a census designated place in the 2010 U.S. census.

=== 2020 census ===
As of the 2020 census, Redwood Valley had a population of 1,843. The population density was 671.2 inhabitants per square mile (259.2/km^{2}). 92.6% of residents lived in urban areas, while 7.4% lived in rural areas.

The racial makeup of Redwood Valley was 1,159 (62.9%) White, 7 (0.4%) African American, 95 (5.2%) Native American, 15 (0.8%) Asian, 0 (0.0%) Pacific Islander, 304 (16.5%) from other races, and 263 (14.3%) from two or more races. Hispanic or Latino of any race were 488 persons (26.5%).

The whole population lived in households. There were 659 households, out of which 204 (31.0%) had children under the age of 18 living in them, 338 (51.3%) were married-couple households, 54 (8.2%) were cohabiting couple households, 144 (21.9%) had a female householder with no partner present, and 123 (18.7%) had a male householder with no partner present. 158 households (24.0%) were one person, and 81 (12.3%) were one person aged 65 or older. The average household size was 2.8. There were 466 families (70.7% of all households).

The age distribution was 424 people (23.0%) under the age of 18, 91 people (4.9%) aged 18 to 24, 479 people (26.0%) aged 25 to 44, 474 people (25.7%) aged 45 to 64, and 375 people (20.3%) who were 65 years of age or older. The median age was 42.1 years. For every 100 females, there were 98.2 males, and for every 100 females age 18 and over there were 103.6 males age 18 and over.

There were 697 housing units at an average density of 253.8 units per square mile (98.0 units/km^{2}), of which 659 (94.5%) were occupied. Of these, 556 (84.4%) were owner-occupied, and 103 (15.6%) were occupied by renters. 5.5% of housing units were vacant. The homeowner vacancy rate was 1.2% and the rental vacancy rate was 6.4%.

=== Income and poverty ===
In 2023, the US Census Bureau estimated that the median household income was $53,163, and the per capita income was $24,334. About 27.7% of families and 26.1% of the population were below the poverty line.

=== 2010 census ===
The 2010 United States census reported that Redwood Valley had a population of 1,729. The population density was 629.1 inhabitants per square mile (242.9/km^{2}). The racial makeup of Redwood Valley was 1,432 (82.8%) White, 7 (0.4%) African American, 63 (3.6%) Native American, 10 (0.6%) Asian, 1 (0.1%) Pacific Islander, 155 (9.0%) from other races, and 61 (3.5%) from two or more races. Hispanic or Latino of any race were 305 persons (17.6%).

The Census reported that 1,723 people (99.7% of the population) lived in households, 6 (0.3%) lived in non-institutionalized group quarters, and 0 (0%) were institutionalized.

There were 640 households, out of which 217 (33.9%) had children under the age of 18 living in them, 354 (55.3%) were opposite-sex married couples living together, 76 (11.9%) had a female householder with no husband present, 34 (5.3%) had a male householder with no wife present. There were 45 (7.0%) unmarried opposite-sex partnerships, and 8 (1.3%) same-sex married couples or partnerships. 133 households (20.8%) were made up of individuals, and 42 (6.6%) had someone living alone who was 65 years of age or older. The average household size was 2.69. There were 464 families (72.5% of all households); the average family size was 3.06.

The population age distribution is 411 people (23.8%) under the age of 18, 144 people (8.3%) aged 18–24, 390 people (22.6%) aged 25–44, 562 people (32.5%) aged 45–64, and 222 people (12.8%) who were 65 years of age or older. The median age was 41.2 years. For every 100 females, there were 96.3 males. For every 100 females aged 18 and over, there were 93.3 males.

There were 676 housing units at an average density of 246.0 per square mile (95.0/km^{2}), of which 475 (74.2%) were owner-occupied, and 165 (25.8%) were occupied by renters. The homeowner vacancy rate was 1.2%; the rental vacancy rate was 3.5%. 1,276 people (73.8% of the population) lived in owner-occupied housing units and 447 people (25.9%) lived in rental housing units.

== Politics ==
In the state legislature, Redwood Valley is in the 2nd senatorial district, represented by Democrat Mike McGuire, and the 2nd Assembly district, represented by Democrat Chris Rogers.

Federally, Redwood Valley is in California's 2nd congressional district, represented by Democrat Jared Huffman.

Redwood Valley is in Mendocino County's 1st Supervisors district; it is represented by Madeline Cline, a resident of the 1st district.

== Industry ==
Redwood Valley is primarily residential and agricultural. The primary crop by far is winegrapes, with many estate and independent vineyards. There are over a dozen wineries in the area, which participate in an annual wine-tasting event each Father's Day called A Taste of Redwood Valley.

== Schools ==
Redwood Valley is part of the Ukiah Unified School District. Due to a budget shortfall, Redwood Valley Elementary School was closed in June 2010. Its fourth grade and younger students were dispersed to Calpella Elementary in Calpella and its fifth and sixth grade students were absorbed into Eagle Peak Middle School. UUSD students from the area attend Ukiah High School in Ukiah for grades 9–12.

Redwood Valley is also home of the Redwood Valley Outdoor Education Project, an organization which works with elementary schools in the district to provide hands-on science education.

In addition, Redwood Valley is the home of Deep Valley Christian School (Preschool to High School) which is accredited by the Western Association of Schools and Colleges.

Eagle peak Middle School a stem school is also located in Redwood Valley, California.

== Other places of interest ==
Redwood Valley is home to the Redwood Valley Rancheria and the Coyote Valley Reservation of the native Pomo people.

Abhayagiri Monastery and Holy Transfiguration Monastery are located at the north end of Redwood Valley.

== See also ==
- Northwestern Pacific Railroad
