= Blue Lake Rancheria =

Indian reservation in California, United States

Coordinates: 40°53′01″N 124°00′00″W

Location of Blue Lake Rancheria

The Blue Lake Rancheria is a federally recognized tribe of Wiyot, Yurok, and Hupa Indians located northwest of the city of Blue Lake in Humboldt County, California, on approximately 76 acres (0.31 km^{2}). As of 2007, there were 53 enrolled citizens. As of the 2010 Census the population of Blue Lake Rancheria was 58.

== History ==
An approximately 26 acres (0.11 km^{2}) area, named the Blue Lake Rancheria was set up by Executive Order on December 24, 1908, to provide a refuge for otherwise homeless native people, but the Rancheria was terminated in 1954 by the federal government.

In 1966, the United States government returned the Blue Lake Rancheria to the tribe and removed all Native rights from the tribe's citizens.

A class action lawsuit, Tillie Hardwick v. United States of America, was won in 1983 by 17 rancherias, including Blue Lake Rancheria; the federal government was ordered to reinstate federal recognition for all the plaintiffs. These rights were returned in 1989 and the tribe now operates under their own constitution.

In January 2008, the Blue Lake Rancheria Tribal Court was established to adjudicate both civil and criminal matters inside the reservation.

The area has a 55,000-square-foot casino and 102 hotel rooms. After the 2011 Tōhoku earthquake and tsunami caused local panic and confusion among travellers (but little damage), the complex installed 420 kW solar panels, grid batteries and backup generators to retain electricity after expected storms, wildfires and earthquakes, and supply the grid during peak demand.

== Education ==
The rancheria is served by the Blue Lake Union Elementary School District and Northern Humboldt Union High School District.

== Enrollment ==
The requirement to enroll into the Blue Lake Rancheria is lineal descent, which means that there is no restriction on blood quantum.

== See also ==
- List of Indian reservations in the United States
