= Coyote Valley Reservation =

Indian reservation in California, United States

Coyote Valley Reservation sho:wdaxa:y (Northern Pomo)
- Indian Reservation
- Location in California
- Coordinates: 39°15′15″N 123°12′32″W
- Country: United States
- State: California
- County: Mendocino County
- Elevation: 692 ft (211 m)

The 70-acre (280,000 m^{2}) Coyote Valley Reservation (Northern Pomo: sho:wdaxa:y, originally shamxa:wi) in Redwood Valley, California is home to about 170 members of the Coyote Valley tribe of the Native American Pomo people, who descend from the Shodakai Pomo. They are a federally recognized tribe, who were formerly known as the Coyote Valley Band of Pomo Indians of California.

It is also the location of the Coyote Valley Shodakai Casino.

The Coyote Valley tribe were formerly located a few miles to the southeast, at the Coyote Valley Rancheria. The Rancheria site was flooded by the construction of the Coyote Dam, creating Lake Mendocino, and the tribe relocated to the current reservation.

They are a member of the InterTribal Sinkyone Wilderness Council which is a consortium of Northern California tribal nations focused on environmental and cultural preservation. The council, which includes members of 10 federally recognized tribes in Mendocino and Lake counties, has worked to protect lands of cultural importance along the North Coast within the traditional Sinkyone tribal territory since it was established in 1986. The California Natural Resources Agency has discussed co-management of Jackson Demonstration State Forest with the tribe which is within their ancestral lands.

== See also ==
Other current Pomo communities in Mendocino County:

- Redwood Valley Rancheria
- Round Valley Indian Tribes of the Round Valley Reservation
