= Redwood Valley Rancheria =

Federally recognized Native American tribe in the United States

Coordinates: 39°17′25″N 123°10′47″W

Location of Redwood Valley Rancheria

The Redwood Valley Rancheria (Northern Pomo: kat'il); officially known as Redwood Valley Little River Band of Pomo Indians) is a federally recognized Indian tribe located in Redwood Valley, Mendocino County, California. The tribe is primarily composed of Pomo Indians. Redwood Valley Rancheria is a sovereign Indian tribe with the powers of self-governance.

== Location and land status ==
The Rancheria is located approximately 1.25 miles northeast of the community of Redwood Valley in Mendocino County, California and consists of 160 acres of land held in trust to the Tribe by the United States as well as additional land held in trust to individuals.

The property consists of 10 acres of rolling hills where the Tribal Office, Learning Center and 33-home Tribal community is located, and 150 acres of steep grassland, oak woodland and chaparral to the east. It is an irregular parcel on the east side of the valley and faces generally west. It extends from the top of the ridge that separates Redwood and Potter Valleys to the edge of the valley floor. The elevation ranges from 900 feet on the western border to 2300 feet on the eastern ridgetops. The area is in a mild and transitional climate between coastal and interior valleys. Rainfall averages 35 inches (890 mm) per year.

== Culture and History ==
The Redwood Valley Little River Band of Pomo Indians (Redwood Valley Rancheria) is a federally recognized Indian tribe located in Redwood Valley, Mendocino County, California. For several thousand years the Tribe’s ancestors lived along the West Fork of the Russian River, located north of Calpella, CA. The Tribe interacted with other Pomo tribes located within the Russian River watershed, the Eel River watershed, and with tribes found along the coasts of the Clearlake and the Pacific Ocean. They were hunters, gatherers, basket-weavers, singers and dancers. Their lives were rich with language, art, ceremony, and community. Sadly, much was lost with the advancement of European settlers before and after the California Goldrush. State and federal policies were implemented that dislodged the Pomo from their traditional lands and undermined their relationship to their land, language and culture. Only now is it being recognized that this was state sponsored genocide of a people and culture.

In 1909 Redwood Valley Rancheria was established as a home for "Homeless Indians," as a result of the Indian Appropriation Act of 1908. However, In 1958 the United States Congress terminated Redwood Valley Rancheria and many other tribes by enacting the California Rancheria Termination Act. In 1983, as a result of court judgement in Tillie Hardwick, et al. v. United States of America, et al., this termination was declared illegal. Redwood Valley Rancheria and many other rancherias had their tribal status restored. Since then the tribe has formed a tribal government, acquired a land-base, began an economic-development program, and established numerous social, educational, and environmental programs.

== Government ==
On June 20, 1987, The Redwood Valley Band of Pomo Indians was formed with a constitution and bylaws, according to the Indian Reorganization Act of 1934. This tribe now governs the Redwood Valley Rancheria by a General Council, who elects a seven-member Tribal Council. The tribe is federally recognized by the Bureau of Indian Affairs.

== See also ==
Other current Pomo communities in Mendocino County:

- Coyote Valley Band of Pomo Indians of California, of the Coyote Valley Reservation
- Round Valley Indian Tribes of the Round Valley Reservation (part Pomo)
