= Hopland Band of Pomo Indians of the Hopland Rancheria =

Coordinates: 38°58′53″N 123°03′35″W

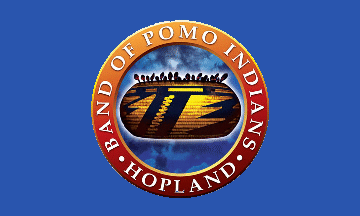

Total population
- 700

Regions with significant populations
- United States (California)

Languages
- English, Pomoan languages

Religion
- Roundhouse religion, Christianity, Kuksu

Related ethnic groups
- Pomo tribes

The Hopland Band of Pomo Indians of the Hopland Rancheria is a federally recognized tribe of Pomo people in Mendocino County, California, south of Ukiah. The Hopland Band Pomos traditionally lived in the Sanel Valley.

== Reservation ==
Location of the Hopland Rancheria

The Hopland Pomo's reservation is the Hopland Rancheria. Approximately 700 tribal members live in the area and 50 on the ranchería. The Rancheria was established in 1907 and is 40 acres (160,000 m^{2}) large. It is located about three miles (5 km) east of Hopland, California.

== Government ==
The Hopland Pomo ratified their constitution on August 20, 1981, which established a governing 7-person council.

The tribe conducts business from Hopland, California.

== Services and programs ==
The Hopland Band of Pomo Indians has a tribal education program, EPA office, health department, utility department, police department, court system, and economic development corporation.

== Disenrollment ==
In 2016, the Hopland Band disenrolled 74 members of the tribe, ostensibly to remedy mistakes stemming from faulty processing of applications.

== Notable members ==
- Susan Billy, basket maker
- Susan Santiago Billy (1884–1968), basket maker

== See also ==
- Pomo people
