= Pinoleville Pomo Nation =

Coordinates: 39°10′49″N 123°13′04″W

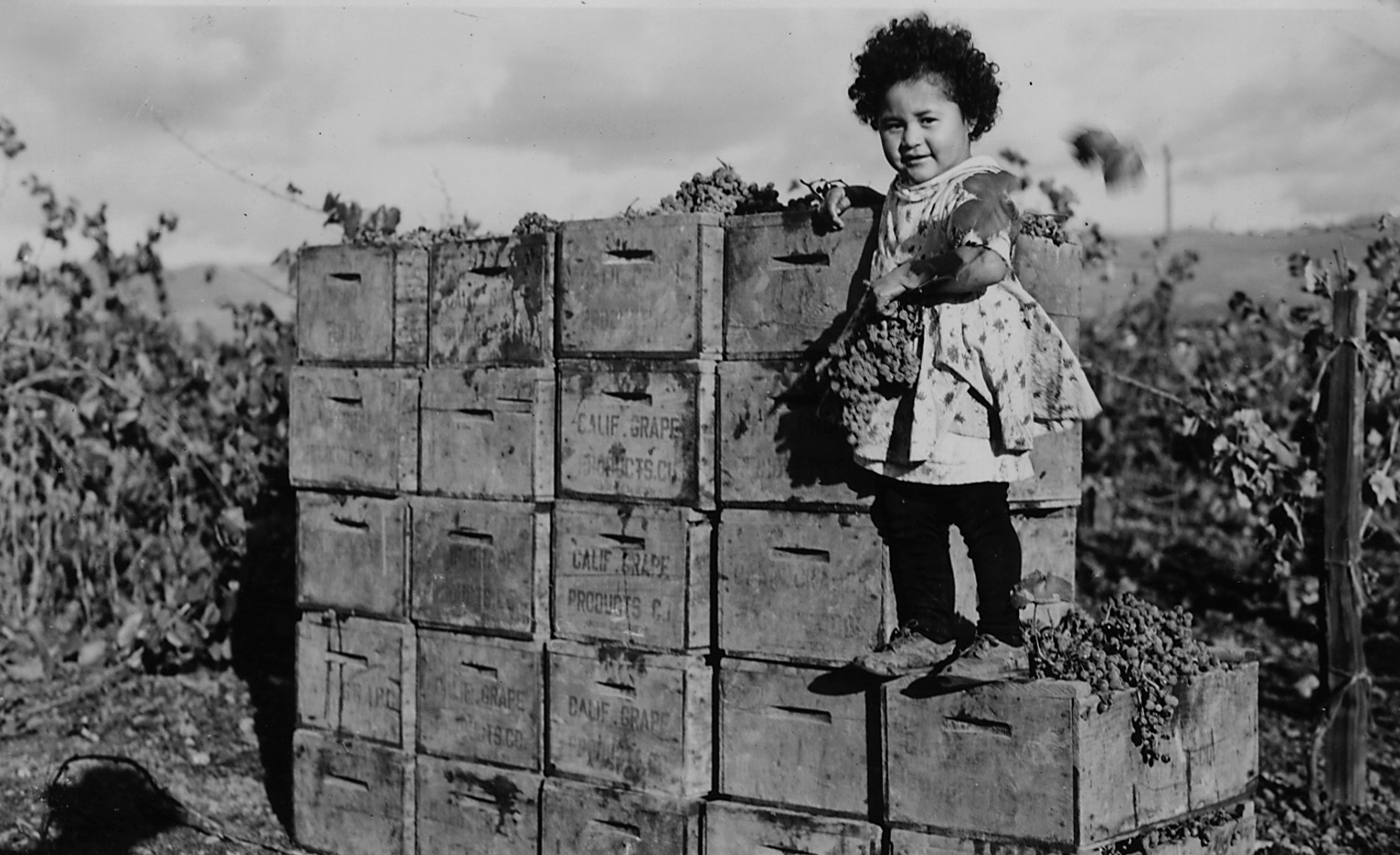
- Pat, a young Pomo girl at the grape harvest at Pinoleville Rancheria, 1938

Total population
- 280

Regions with significant populations
- United States (California)

Languages
- English, Pomoan languages

Religion
- Roundhouse religion, Christianity, Kuksu

Related ethnic groups
- Pomo tribes

The Pinoleville Pomo Nation is a federally recognized tribe of Pomo people in Mendocino County, California. Leona Williams serves as Tribal Chairperson.

== History ==
The Pinoleville Pomo Nation is a small band of the greater Pomo Tribe of Northern California. The Pinoleville Pomo Nation is originally from Potter Valley, California, located eighteen miles (29 km) north-northeast of Ukiah, California where the Pinoleville Pomo Nation currently resides.

Prior to the arrival of the European colonizers, there were three main villages in Potter Valley called Pomo, Sedam (or Tse tum) and Canel (or Shanel, Sanel), and several smaller villages and camps. These villages remained connected and cooperative with each other through marriage, and ceremonies. They were governed by councilmen called tca ka-li in Northern Pomo, also sometimes known as captains.

The arrival of the Spanish, Russians, and fur traders in the early 1800s was devastating for Native Californians and their way of life. In the first half of the century, the Pomos suffered from forced removal, disease and servitude from the settlers.

This domination continued into the second half of the 17th century with the discovery of gold in California. By 1850 thousands of Europeans had arrived in northern California hoping to strike rich. Treaties were proposed to guarantee land for most California Natives, including the Pomos, but the treaties never reached ratification. Thus the California government declared that all land that was not claimed was public land, meaning the land the Pomos and many of Native Californians lived on was allowed to be settled on by non-Native peoples.

The Pomos were forced off their land as the new settlers began using the land for ranching. The Pomos were left to settle on non-fertile lands in the periphery of the land they once lived on and struggled to find enough food to survive.

=== Bloody Run – 1871 ===
The majority of the remaining Pomos living in Potter Valley were brutally forced by the militia to leave Potter Valley and walk to Round Valley Reservation, 65 miles north of Ukiah. This event is called “Ba-lay-Ba-lin” or “Bloody Run” because the Eel River ran red with the blood of the deceased for three days. This history is not widely cited, but has been recounted by Pinoleville Pomo Nation members whose ancestors experienced this atrocity. One member recounted the Bloody Run, stating, “the white men herded all the Indians like cattle, and if you were too slow you were shot from behind and thrown in the river.” There were many young and elderly people who were unable to keep up and thus killed. Those who were not murdered were forced to walk to Round Valley Reservation.

=== Purchasing of Pinoleville – 1878–1893 ===
In 1878, a large group of Potter Valley Pomos left the Round Valley Reservation and purchased 51 acres of land on the north side of Ukiah. This land was known as ke-buk ke-bul, but soon was known as Pinoleville.

In 1893 the Pinoleville captains joined with other Northern Pomo captains and traded their land at $10 for 100 acres between Ackerman Creek (ya-mo-bida – wind hole creek), and Orr springs Road. This is where the Pinoleville Pomo people settled. The captains allowed displaced families and tribelets to live in Pinoleville.

=== Pinoleville Rancheria – 1905–1966 ===
In 1905, a Bureau of Indian Affairs survey stated the land was overcrowded, and through the Homeless, Landless Indian Act, a Rancheria was purchased next to the original piece of land in 1911. This land came to be called the Pinoleville Rancheria.

The status of the Pinoleville Rancheria changed in 1958 when the US government began to implement integration policies throughout the United States. In 1966 the Pinoleville Rancheria was terminated.

=== Tillie Hardwick v. US – 1983 ===
Despite this, in 1983 Pinoleville became a part of Tillie Hardwick v. US, a class action suit against the federal government for the termination of Indian Rancherias. Tillie Hardwick was successful and seventeen tribes which were formally terminated won formal recognition from the US government.

=== Federal recognition of Pinoleville Pomo Nation – 2005–2006 ===
On June 26, 2005, Pinoleville Pomo Nation adopted their own constitution and elected seven officials to serve as the tribal council with four year terms. In 2006, Pinoleville Pomo Nation signed a Title IV compact with the US government and was recognized as a Self-Governance Tribe.

== Culture ==
=== Housing ===
Winter shelters (tca) were hemispherical, with floors sunken a foot or so into the ground and walls woven of willow, thatched with thick grass, tules, or willow. These might house anywhere from one to five families. They also built small sweat houses (tca-ne), which also served as meeting places or warm winter quarters for men. The main villages had large meeting houses, or roundhouses, some of which could hold several hundred people for ceremonies and dances. In the summer camps, a brush shelter sufficed.

=== Nomadic Food Collection ===
Rather than an agricultural tribe, the Pomo were nomadic people who moved throughout Northern California depending on the season. They moved with the seasons, gathering what they needed where it was abundant. In spring, they walked to the coast to collect seaweed, abalone and shellfish. These were dried and brought back to be stored for winter. Hunting of small game, using ingenious traps, spears, or arrows, was done throughout the year.

The most important staple food of the Pomo people was acorns, gathered in the fall and carefully stored for winter. Fish, deer and elk meat were also dried for winter stores.

=== Baskets ===
The Pomo people excelled in making baskets. Learn more about the Pomo's baskets on the main Pomo Wikipedia page.

=== Tribal services and projects ===
Pinoleville Pomo Nation currently operates a housing program to support low income residents, and encourage the construction of sustainable housing through a partnership with the housing committee and environmental department. Thus far, two houses constructed by the Pinoleville Pomo Nation with guidance by architects and engineers from UC Berkeley have been completed.

Through their environmental department the Pinoleville Pomo Nation has created a horticultural program, which focuses on tribal youth — educating them about plants, to improve self-esteem and provide skills. These skills and knowledge is also aimed to improve diets and the local environment. In addition to this, Pinole Nation Gardens include a greenhouse, orchards, two gardens, and native plant restoration areas which are located in Ukiah.

== See also ==
- Pomo people
