= Ranchería =

Small, rural settlement

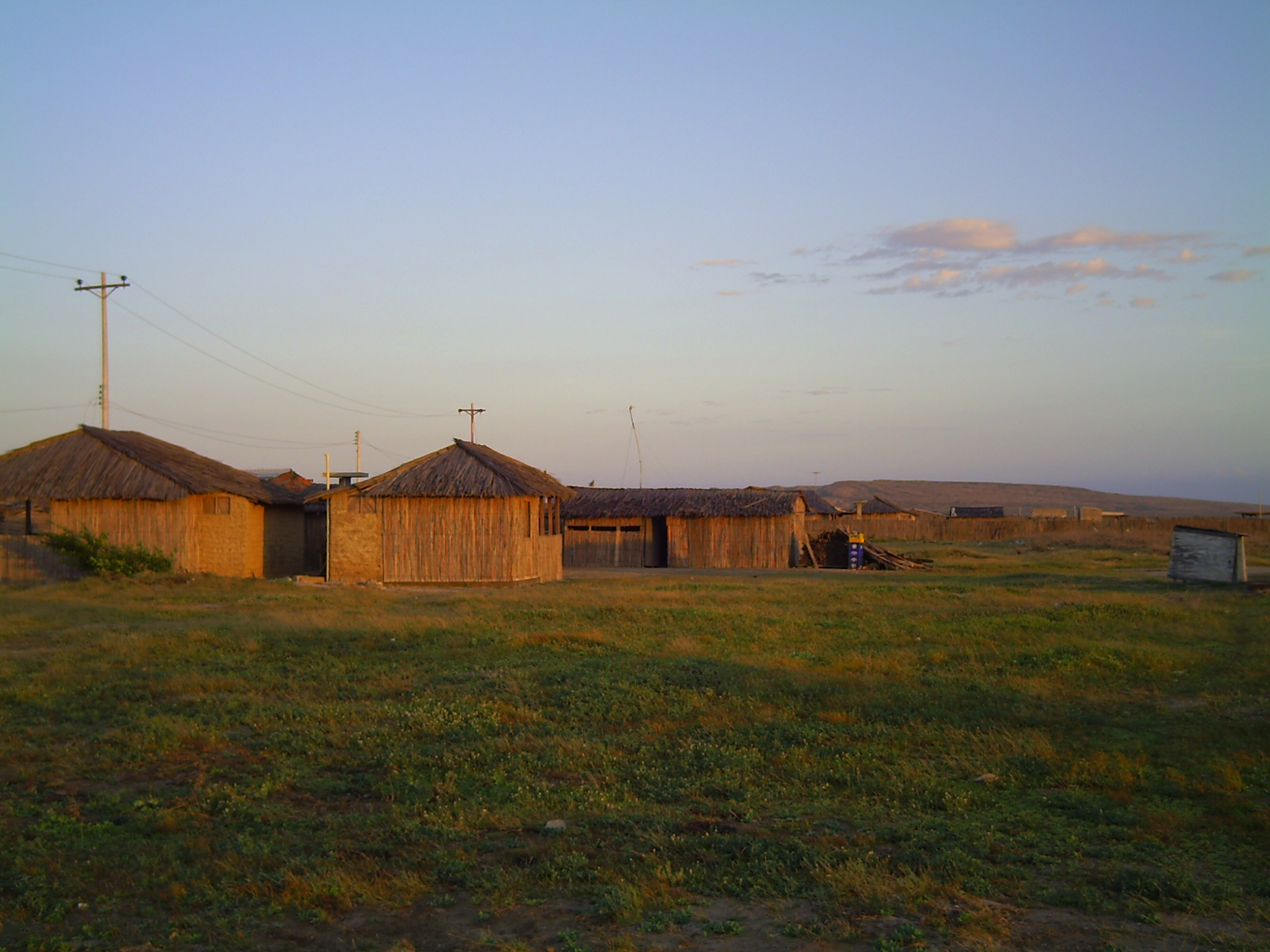
A Wayuu rancheria, located in the Guajira Peninsula, Colombia

The Spanish word ranchería, or rancherío, refers to a small, rural settlement. In the Americas the term was applied to native villages or bunkhouses. Anglo-Americans adopted the term with both these meanings, usually to designate the residential area of a rancho in the American Southwest, housing aboriginal ranch hands and their families. The term is still used in other parts of Spanish America; for example, the Wayuu tribes in northern Colombia call their villages rancherías.

The Columbia Encyclopedia describes it as:

a type of communal settlement formerly characteristic of the Yaqui Indians of Sonora, Tepehuanes of Durango, Mexico, and of various small Native American groups of the Southwestern U.S., especially in California. These clusters of dwellings were less permanent than the pueblos (see Pueblo) but more so than the camps of the migratory Native Americans.

The term could be applied to the settlements of the California Mission Indians beyond the Spanish missions, such as Maugna of the Tongva people.

== History ==
The term 'Ranchería' was used in colonial Spain to refer to the semi-rural settlements favored by many of the Native Indian settlements in the northern frontiers of New Spain. It was typically a farming community developed around established fields of corn, squash, and beans, with the Native families that supported the farms established in simple homes dispersed widely around the community farms. The Native families did not necessarily reside year-round in any particular ranchería; they could migrate between other rancherías or even wilderness encampments, in response to seasonal conditions or threats from outside groups. Spanish elites and religious missions often secured property and 'protectorate' rights over these Indian rancherías with the Spanish government if they claimed to serve as 'protectors' of the indigenous groups on the land.

In California, the term refers to a total of 59 Indian settlements established by the U.S. government, 54 of them between 1906 and 1934, for the survivors of the aboriginal population. San Diego State University maintains a reference titled California Indians and Their Reservations: An Online Dictionary. It says:

The Spanish term for small Indian settlements. Rancherías are a particular California institution. A small area of land was set aside around an Indian settlement to create a ranchería. Some rancherías developed from small communities of Indians formed on the outskirts of American settlements who were fleeing Americans or avoiding removal to the reservations. […] With the passage of Public Law 83-280 in the mid-1950s, terminating federal supervision and control over California tribes, some 40 rancherías lost the right to certain federal programs, and their lands no longer had the protection of federal status. In 1983, a lawsuit resulted in restoring federal recognition to 17 rancherías, with others still waiting for the reversal of their termination.

The word migrated north with the 49ers to the Fraser Canyon Gold Rush in an adapted form, "rancherie". It survives in British Columbia as a somewhat archaic but still commonly used word, in rural areas and small towns, as well as in general First Nations English usage, meaning the residential area of an Indian reserve. It especially means the historical residential area, as opposed to newer subdivisions. It was further extended to refer to other non-white residential communities, such as the Kanaka Rancherie in early Vancouver, British Columbia, which came to house the city's Kanaka (Hawaiian) residents. In an even more truncated form, the Ranche was used to refer to the Tlingit portion of Sitka, Alaska.

== See also ==
- Indian colony
- Indian reserve, Canada
- Indian reservation
- Rancherie, Canada
- Ranchos of California
