= William Mayfield =

William Mayfield (1810–1862) was an American pioneer in Illinois, Texas, and California; a soldier, farmer, miner, and a cattleman. He led Tulare County militia to aid settlers in the early part of the Owens Valley Indian War and was killed in the Battle of Mayfield Canyon.

== Early life in Tennessee & Illinois ==
William Mayfield, was born in Tennessee, in 1810, son of Elijah and Elizabeth Mayfield. His first marriage was on October 6, 1828 to Terissa Faller, also called "Tussa", from Hardeman County, Tennessee. They had 2 children born in Illinois, John Mayfield in 1829 and Benjamin Mayfield in 1831. In 1832, William Mayfield served in the Black Hawk War, as a private in the Company of Captain Levi D. Boone, Brigade of Mounted Volunteers. His unit was mustered into service on April 26, 1832 at Beardstown, Illinois, after being enrolled by the Captain at Montgomery, Illinois on April 20 for 60 days. Mayfield was mustered out of service, along with his unit at the mouth of the Fox River on the Illinois River, on May 28, 1832, while it was attached to the 2nd Regiment under Col. Jacob Fry.

== Texas ==
William Mayfield moved to Texas in spring 1837 and received a provisional 1280 acre land grant in Washington County which forbade him to sell the land and required him to be a responsible citizen for 3 years before his grant became unconditional and he received his patent. In 1838, Mayfield added by purchase to his grant, 300 acres of land fronting on the Navasota River.

William Mayfield served as a Second Corporal in the Texas Rangers, in Captain Henry Smith's Volunteer Rangers, from March 1 - September 1, 1839 during the Texian - Cherokee War. His unit was one of those that fought in the July 15–16, 1839 Battle of the Neches. After he received his patent in 1840 he bought other lands and sold part of them for money. In 1843, Williams third son, Thomas Jefferson Mayfield was born.

Mayfield's son Thomas Jefferson claimed his father fought against the Mexicans with Sam Houston and became a captain. In the Mexican American War he claimed he was in the force of Alexander W. Doniphan and that Doniphan "wrote a letter to Uncle Sam and Uncle Sam made my daddy a colonel." However, there is no record of such an officer with Doniphan's 1st Regiment of Missouri Mounted Volunteers, nor in any of the Texas State units in that war. After William's first wife Terissa or Tussa, died sometime before 1848, he married Mary Ann Curd on March 16, 1848, in Brazos County, Texas.

== California ==
In 1849, William and his family were headed to California with a U. S. Army wagon train but were sent back to avoid the danger to civilians from the Lipan Apache on the trail and they then took a six-month trip by ship from Galveston around Cape Horn to reach California. After they landed at San Francisco, William took his family to the southern end of the San Joaquin Valley, then Mariposa County, now Tulare County to a place at the confluence of Sycamore Creek with the Kings River, (about 1.5 miles above modern Trimmer, California). There he and his sons built a cabin, put in crops and began mining. Thomas Jefferson does not mention a sister but a Miran (Mary Ann) Mayfield, age 3 born in Texas, appears on the California 1850 mortality schedule which means she died between June 1849 and June 1850 and in the 1850 census in Mariposa County there are no other Mayfields there.

The Nov. 13, 1850 census, shows Mayfield 40 with $10,000 in property and his son John 20 as miners. His son Ben 16 is listed separately with Mary 20 and her child S [or T] Willson Mayfield 7, presumably at the cabin. Mayfield and his son John may have taken livestock to Stockton, California at the end of the year because they are also listed as farmers in the 1850 census in San Joaquin County on Nov. 24, 1850.

The whole family (William, Mary, John, Benjamin, and Thomas Wm.) appears once again in the 1850 census in San Joaquin County, on Dec. 3, 1850. Mary died in 1850, apparently in December after that census record was made. In 1851, William left Thomas [8] to be raised by the Choinumni, the friendly Yokuts tribe living across the river from his cabin, while he and his two older sons left to engage in mining and raising cattle for the next 10 years. While his son Thomas Jefferson was living among the Choinumni, William Mayfield helped do the first survey of Tulare County, placed the first hogs around Tulare Lake. With his older sons he ran cattle and horses through most of the San Joaquin Valley, captured wild horses on the west side of that valley and fought Monache on the east side becoming well known throughout the valley.

== Owens Valley Indian War ==
In 1861, cattle were being driven over the Sierras to feed the mining boon town of Aurora. Some cattlemen had begun ranching nearby in the Owens Valley. The consequences of the disastrous winter caused by the Great Flood of 1862 and the encroachment of the cattle on the food supply of the Paiute led to the threat of starvation for the Owens Valley Paiute who were forced to take cattle to feed themselves. This led to a conflict with these ranchers that broke into open warfare, known as the Owens Valley Indian War. The settlers sent word to the county seat at Visalia for help and William Mayfield led a band of Tulare County militiamen to the aid of the settlers there.

After joining forces with a detachment of militia from Aurora, he marched north with his command of 60 men and engaged the Paiute in the Battle of Bishop Creek where his force was driven back and had to hold out in a ditch until nightfall when they were able to withdraw and turned back down the valley. The next day they encountered the California Volunteer force under George S. Evans and Mayfield and 40 of his men, joined him. As Evans' and Mayfield's force marched north, Evans' scouts reported that Lieutenant Noble with fifty men of Company A, 2nd Cavalry, from Fort Churchill on their way south to Putnam's Store were nearby. Colonel Evans halted until Lieutenant Noble's command could come up with them and then proceeded to the north. Scouts were sent out and one scout returned reporting a large force of Indians 12 miles (19 km) away near Bishop Creek. Evans moved up in a snow storm, but the Indians had left at the approach of the main body of cavalry. Campfires were observed in a canyon to the north. April 9, 1862, the following day Evans advanced to the canyon now known as Mayfield Canyon and engaged the Paiute who were above them in the canyon. Mayfield and four of his men advanced with the Volunteers and he was wounded in the firefight. While being carried back under fire he was killed. Mayfield Canyon was later named in his honor.

== Legacy ==
Of William Mayfield's sons after his death, none were married or had children. John herded cattle until poisoned by a cook after a quarrel about 1870. Benjamin became a miner but was tried twice for murder after he killed the outlaw John Mason in 1866. Exonerated in 1869, he died an embittered man in the 1870s. Thomas Jefferson Mayfield became known after his death in 1928 for the tale of his days as a boy among the Choinumni. The site of the Mayfield cabin and the Choinumni village across the Kings River are now under Pine Flat Lake.
