= Tisechu, California =

Choinimni settlement in California, USA

Coordinates: 36.8237°N 119.3473°W

Tisechu (also, Tis-e-chu and Tishech) is a former Choinimni settlement in Fresno County, California, United States.

It was located at the confluence of Kings River and Mill Creek.

The Choinimni were a branch of the Yokuts people.
