= Pine Flat =

Pine Flat may refer to:

- Pine Flat, California, in Tulare County
- Pine Flat Dam
- Pine Flat Lake
