= Marion Peak =

Mountain in California, United States

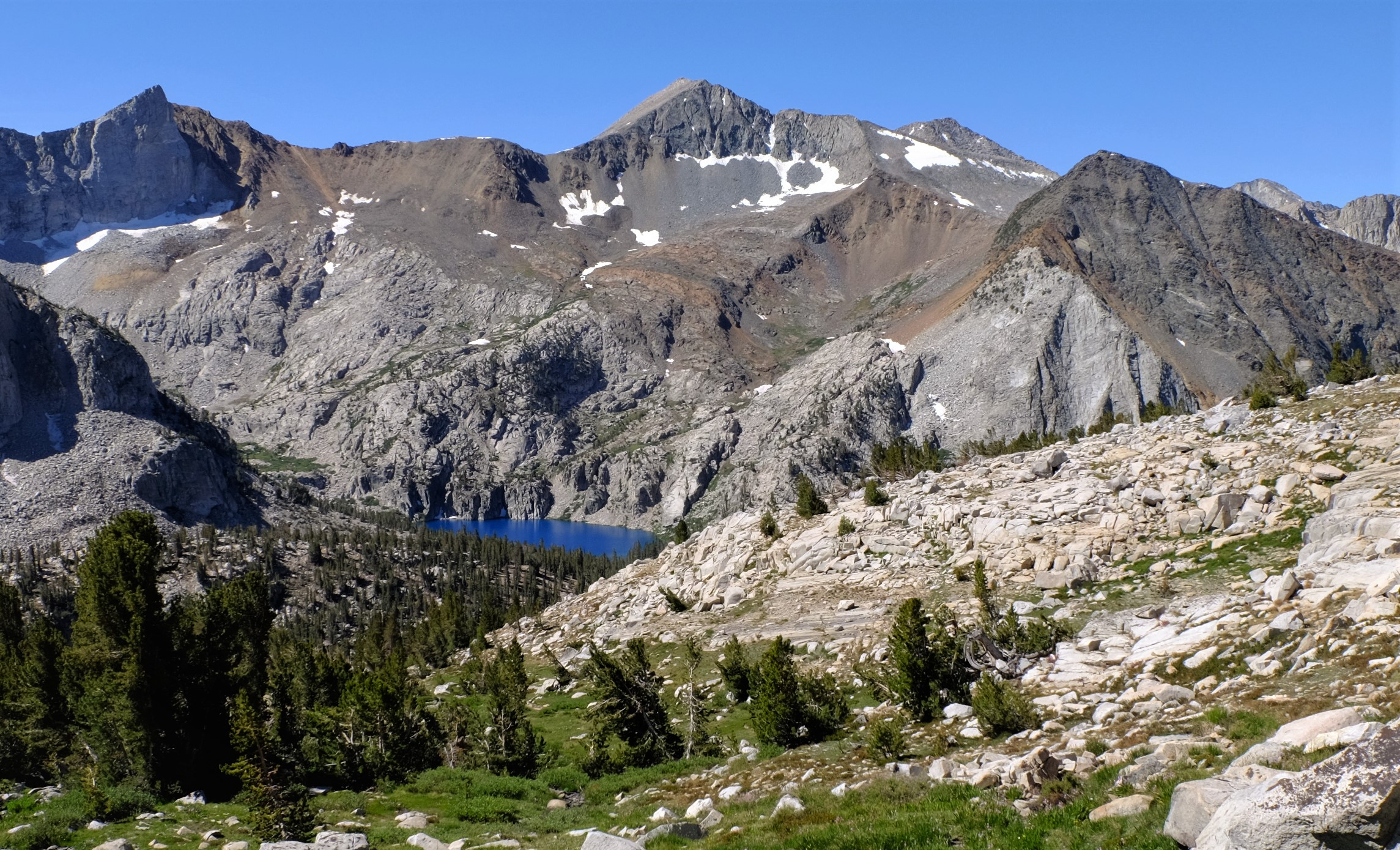
- North aspect centered, with Marion Lake

Highest point
- Elevation: 12,719 ft (3,877 m)
- Prominence: 1,138 ft (347 m)
- Parent peak: Arrow Peak (12,962 ft)
- Isolation: 2.63 mi (4.23 km)
- Listing: Sierra Peaks Section
- Coordinates: 36°57′25″N 118°31′20″W

Geography
- Location within California Location within the United States
- Location: Kings Canyon National Park; Fresno County; California, U.S.
- Parent range: Sierra Nevada
- Topo map: USGS Marion Peak

Geology
- Rock type: granitic

Climbing
- First ascent: 1902
- Easiest route: class 2 East slope

Marion Peak is a remote 12,719-foot-elevation (3,877-meter) mountain summit located in Kings Canyon National Park, in Fresno County of northern California, United States. It is situated on Cirque Crest which is west of the crest of the Sierra Nevada mountain range, 2.13 miles (3.43 km) northeast of State Peak, and 2.6 miles (4.2 km) northwest of Arrow Peak, the nearest higher neighbor. Topographic relief is significant as the north aspect rises 2,400 feet (730 meters) above Marion Lake in one mile, and the southeast aspect rises 3,500 feet (1,100 meters) above South Fork Kings River in less than two miles.

== History ==
The first ascent of the summit was made July 22, 1902, by Joseph Nisbet LeConte and Curds Lindley via the east slope. They climbed it in order to scout a possible route to the northern Palisades. The class 3 Northwest Ridge was first climbed August 11, 1945, by Art Reyman.

Marion Peak is named in association with Marion Lake below is northern slopes. Marion Lake was named by Joseph N. LeConte for his wife, Helen Marion Gompertz LeConte (1865–1924), who accompanied him on this 1902 pioneering trip up Cartridge Creek. This mountain's name has been officially adopted by the United States Board on Geographic Names.

== Climate ==
According to the Köppen climate classification system, Marion Peak is located in an alpine climate zone. Most weather fronts originate in the Pacific Ocean, and travel east toward the Sierra Nevada mountains. As fronts approach, they are forced upward by the peaks, causing them to drop their moisture in the form of rain or snowfall onto the range (orographic lift). Precipitation runoff from this mountain drains into tributaries of the Kings River.

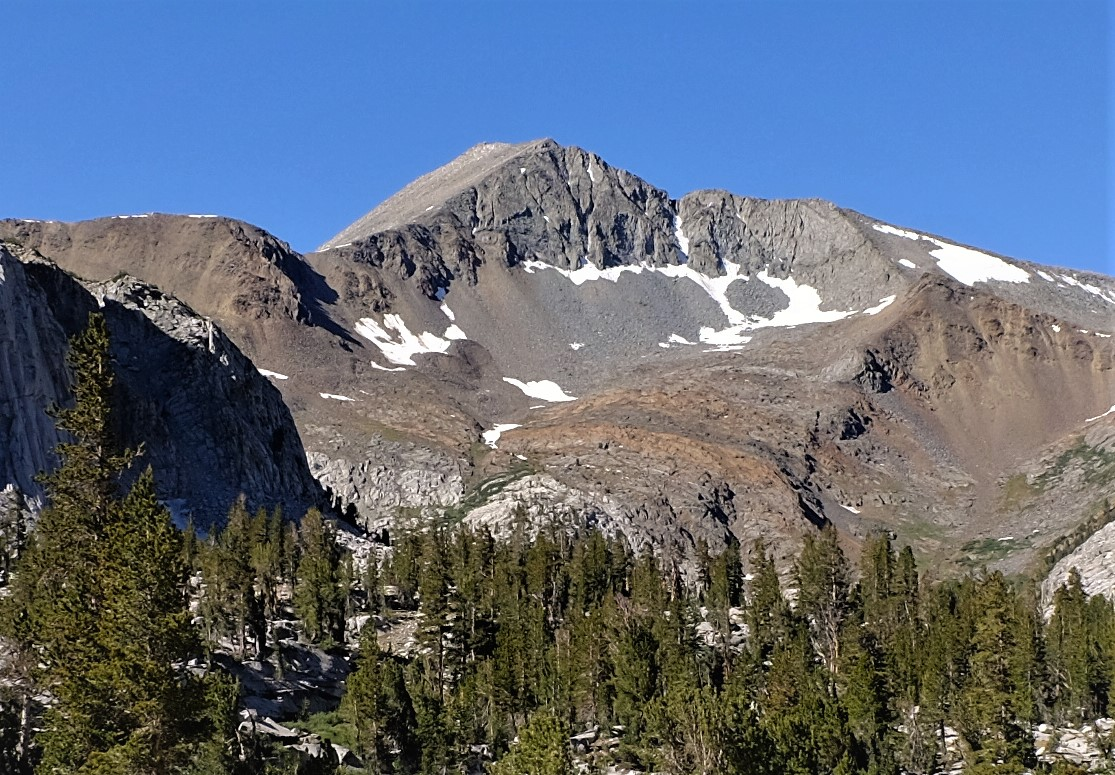
Marion Peak

== See also ==
- List of mountain peaks of California
