= Yawdanchi dialect =

Tule-Kaweah Yokuts dialect of California

Yawdanchi
- Native to: United States
- Region: Tule River, California
- Ethnicity: Yawdanchi Yokuts
- Extinct: c. 20th century
- Language family: Yok-Utian: Yokutsan; General Yokuts; Nim; Tule-Kaweah Yokuts; Yawdanchi

Language codes
- ISO 639-3: –
- Glottolog: yawd1234

Yawdanchi (also spelled Yaudanchi) was a variety of Tule–Kaweah Yokuts that was historically spoken by the Yawdanchi Yokuts people living along the Tule River in the Tulare Lake Basin of California. The Yawdanchi dialect is closely related to the Wiikchamni dialect. It is now extinct.

Yawdanchi was documented by A. L. Kroeber who published an article on the grammar and phonology of the dialect in 1907.
