= Kings River Yokuts =

Extinct Yokutsan language of California, US

- Native to: United States
- Region: San Joaquin Valley, California
- Ethnicity: Yokuts people
- Extinct: June 22, 2017, with the death of Hank Oliver
- Language family: Yok-Utian ?: Yokuts; General Yokuts; Nim; Northern Yokuts; Kings River Yokuts
- Dialects: Choynimni; Chukaymina; Michahay; Ayitcha

Language codes
- ISO 639-3: (included in Yokuts [yok])
- Glottolog: king1260 Kings River
- Historical distribution of Kings River Yokuts

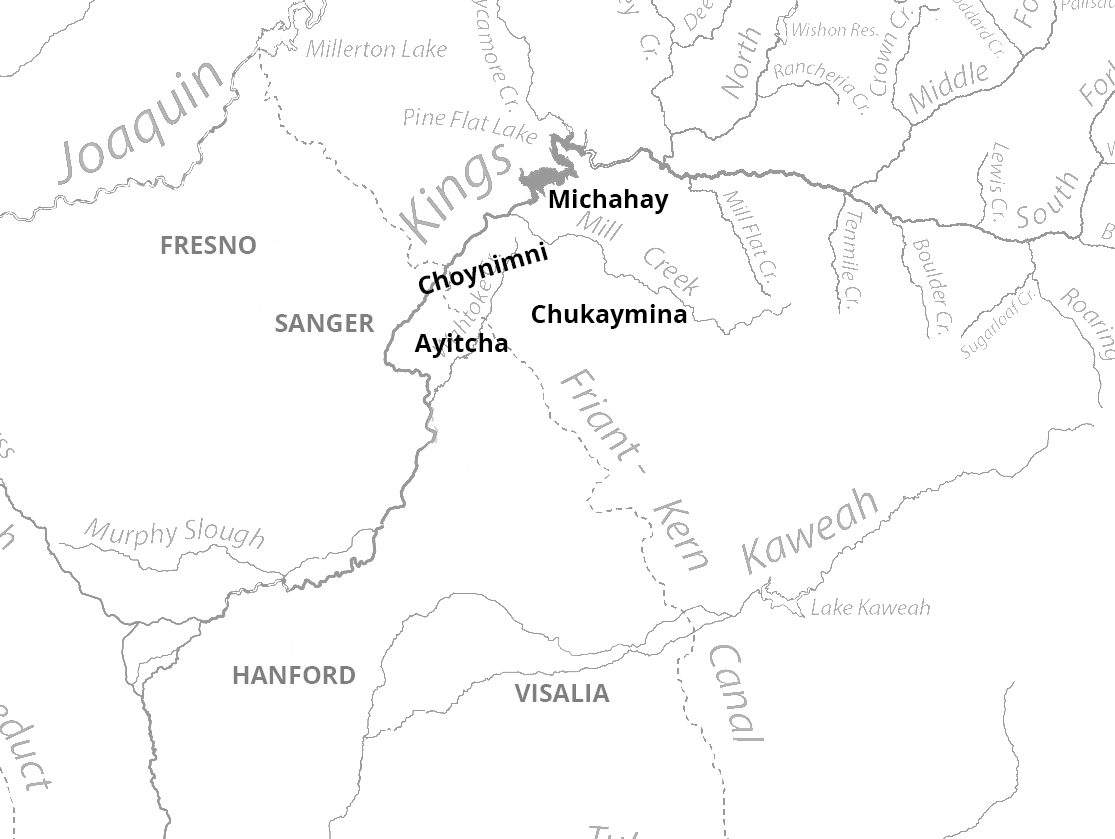
Historical distribution of Kings River Yokuts dialects

Kings River was a dialect of the Yokutsan language of California.

== Dialects ==
There were four dialects of Kings River, Chukaymina, Michahay, Ayitcha (a.k.a. Kocheyali), and Choynimni.
