= Tule–Kaweah Yokuts =

Extinct Yokuts dialect of California, US

- Native to: United States
- Region: San Joaquin Valley, California
- Ethnicity: Yokuts people
- Extinct: 25 September 2021, with the death of Marie Wilcox
- Language family: Yok-Utian ?: Yokuts; General Yokuts; Nim; Tule–Kaweah Yokuts
- Dialects: Wukchumni; Yawdanchi; Bokninuwad

Language codes
- ISO 639-3: (included in Yokuts [yok])
- Glottolog: tule1245
- Distribution of Tule–Kaweah Yokuts

Tule–Kaweah was a major variety of the Yokuts language of California, or possibly a distinct but closely related language.

Wukchumni, the last surviving dialect, had only one native or fluent speaker, Marie Wilcox (both native and fluent), who compiled a dictionary of the language. "Marie's dictionary", a short documentary by Emmanuel Vaughan-Lee, is about her dictionary. She also recorded an oral version of the dictionary. Together with her daughter Jennifer, Marie Wilcox taught weekly classes to interested members of their tribe. Marie Wilcox died on September 25, 2021, rendering Tule–Kaweah extinct.

== Dialects ==
There were three dialects of Tule–Kaweah, †Wukchumni (Wikchamni), †Yawdanchi (a.k.a. Nutaa), and †Bokninuwad.
