= Thomas Mayfield =

Thomas Mayfield may refer to:

- Thomas Edd Mayfield (1926–1958), bluegrass singer and guitarist
- Thomas Jefferson Mayfield (1843–1928), adopted member of the Choinumni branch of the Yokuts tribe
