= Palewyami Yokuts =

Yokutsan language of California

Palewyami
- Poso Creek, Altinin
- Native to: United States
- Region: San Joaquin Valley, California
- Ethnicity: Yokuts
- Extinct: 1930s
- Language family: Yok-Utian ?: Yokuts; Palewyami

Language codes
- ISO 639-3: (included in Yokuts [yok])
- Glottolog: pale1254

Palewyami, also known as Altinin and Poso Creek Yokuts, was a major dialect of the Yokuts language of California, or possibly a distinct but closely related language.

Palewyami was spoken in Kern County, along Poso Creek. The language has not been spoken since the 1930s.

== Sources ==
- Gamble, Geoffrey, Yokuts Imperative and Demonstrative Pronouns, American Indian Linguistics and Ethnography in Honor of Laurence C. Thompson (eds., Anthony Mattina and Timothy Montler), pp. 385-396, Missoula, University of Montana Occasional Papers in Linguistics, no. 10, 1993, ISBN 1-879763-10-9
