= State Peak =

Mountain in California, United States

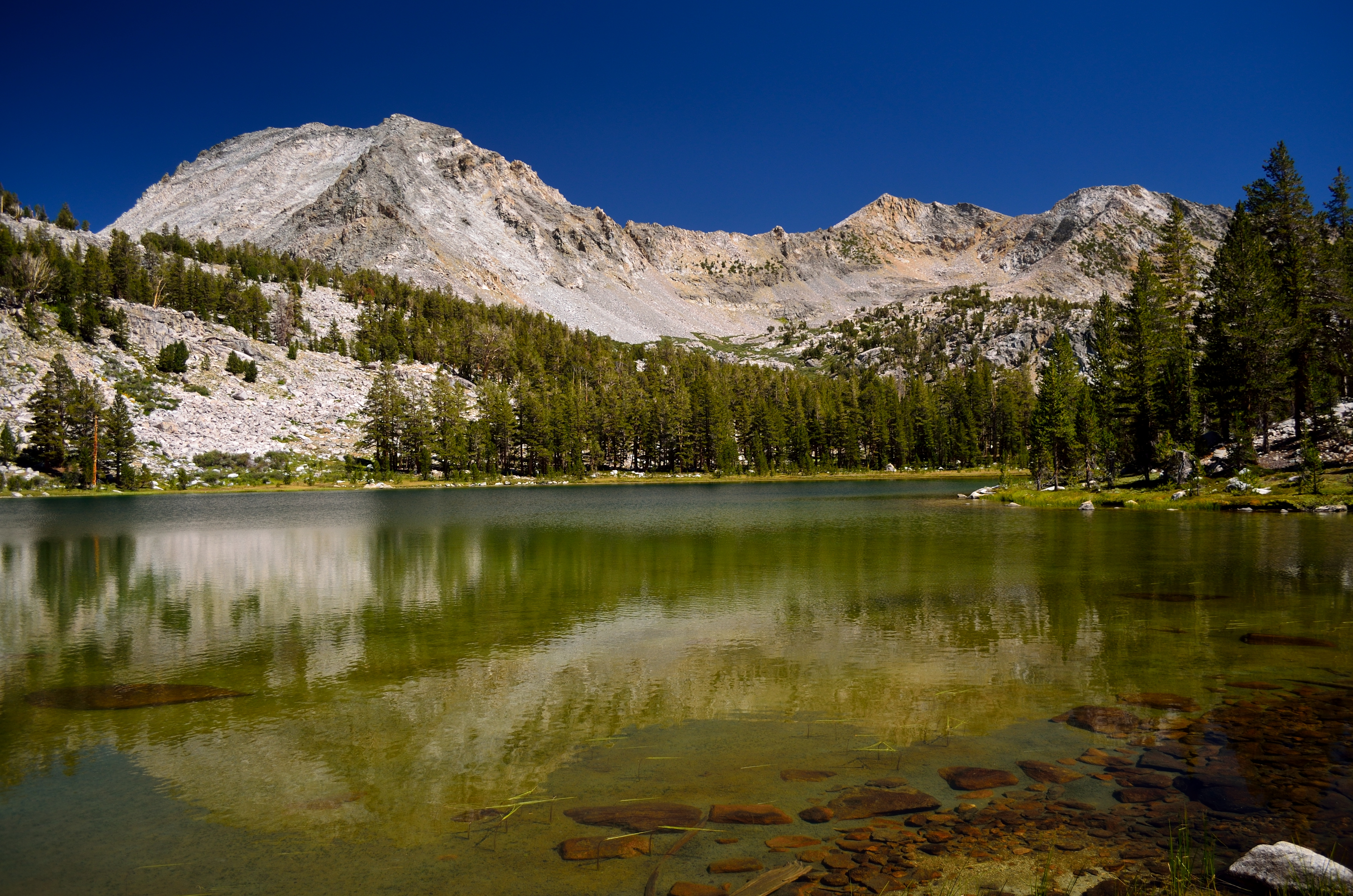
- West aspect (left) from State Lakes

Highest point
- Elevation: 12,620 ft (3,850 m)
- Prominence: 620 ft (190 m)
- Parent peak: Marion Peak (12,719 ft)
- Isolation: 2.14 mi (3.44 km)
- Listing: Sierra Peaks Section; Mountains of California
- Coordinates: 36°55′55″N 118°32′44″W

Geography
- Location within California Location within the United States
- Location: Kings Canyon National Park; Fresno County; California, U.S.
- Parent range: Sierra Nevada
- Topo map: USGS Marion Peak

Geology
- Rock type: granitic

Climbing
- First ascent: 1935
- Easiest route: class 2

State Peak is a remote 12,620-foot-elevation (3,850-meter) mountain summit located in Kings Canyon National Park, in Fresno County of northern California, United States. It is situated on Cirque Crest which is west of the crest of the Sierra Nevada mountain range, 3.03 miles (4.88 km) west of Arrow Peak, and 2.13 miles (3.43 km) southwest of Marion Peak, the nearest higher neighbor. Topographic relief is significant as the west aspect rises 2,100 feet (640 meters) above State Lakes in 1.5 mile, and the southeast aspect rises 4,000 feet (1,200 meters) above South Fork Kings River in 1.5 mile.

== History ==
The first ascent of the summit was likely made in 1935 by a Sierra Club party who "climbed peaks of Cirque Crest." This mountain was named by Robert B. Marshall, chief USGS geographer, and has been officially adopted by the United States Board on Geographic Names.

== Climate ==
According to the Köppen climate classification system, State Peak is located in an alpine climate zone. Most weather fronts originate in the Pacific Ocean, and travel east toward the Sierra Nevada mountains. As fronts approach, they are forced upward by the peaks, causing them to drop their moisture in the form of rain or snowfall onto the range (orographic lift). Precipitation runoff from this mountain drains into tributaries of the South Fork Kings River.
