= Rodgers Crossing Dam =

Proposed dam in California

Rodgers Crossing Dam was a major dam proposed for the Kings River in Central California. The dam would have been situated at the unincorporated community of Rodgers Crossing in Fresno County, in the foothills of the Sierra Nevada 30 miles (48 km) east of Fresno. The project was pushed during the 1960s and 1970s by the Kings River Conservation District (KRCD) to provide flood control and irrigation water supply. The estimated annual yield would be 100,000 acre-feet (0.12 km^{3}).

The purpose was to nearly double the storage capacity on the Kings River, as the existing Pine Flat Dam is unable to provide the high degree of flood protection for which it was originally built. The original plan called for a concrete gravity dam 640 feet (200 m) high, which would have formed a reservoir flooding 11 miles (18 km) of the Kings River, nearly up to the boundary of Kings Canyon National Park. The reservoir would have a capacity of 737,000 acre-feet (0.909 km^{3}), and the dam would have a hydroelectric generating capacity of 310 megawatts.

During the 1980s, the Rodgers Crossing dam was dropped due to poor economic justifications, and pushback from conservationists and the tourism sector who did not want to see the Kings River, a popular whitewater run, flooded by a reservoir. In 1987, a compromise was reached as the Kings River was incorporated into the National Wild and Scenic Rivers System, with the Rodgers Crossing dam site placed under "unified federal protection" that would require an act of Congress to overturn if the dam were to be built in the future.

== See also ==
- List of dams and reservoirs in California
