= Tulamni =

Buena Vista Yokuts language of California, USA

- Native to: United States
- Region: California
- Ethnicity: Tulamni Yokuts
- Extinct: by 1930s
- Language family: Yok-Utian: Yokutsan; General Yokuts; Buena Vista Yokuts; Tulamni

Language codes
- ISO 639-3: –
- Glottolog: tula1254

Tulamni was a dialect of the Buena Vista Yokuts language spoken by the Yokuts around Buena Vista Lake, California.
