= Wukchumni =

Tribe of Yokuts indigenous people of California

The Wukchumni (English: /wʌkˈtʃʌmni/) are a Yokuts tribe of California with about 200 members, residing on the Tule River Reservation. 3000 years ago, they broke off from the main Yokuts group and settled in the region of the east fork of the Kaweah River.

== History ==
Approximately 3000 years ago, the Wukchumni permanently settled in the East Fork Kaweah River. During the summer they occupied villages in the Atwell Mill area as well as the floor of Mineral King Valley. For food, they gathered bulbs, berries, and acorns and hunted bear, deer, and mountain sheep. They went to Hockett Meadow and White Chief Bowl in Sequoia National Park to hunt and trade with the neighboring Paiute people.

== Population ==
It was estimated before European contact the Yokut population reached 50,000, but today, there are less than 200 self-identified Wukchumni people alive. Some members of the Tule River Reservation are of Wukchumni heritage; however, the majority of Wukchumni descendants are not federally recognized. One of the most famous members of today's Wukchumni society was Marie Wilcox, the author of the Wukchumni dictionary, and the last native speaker of the language.

== Language ==
The Wukchumni spoke traditionally a dialect of the Tule-Kaweah Yokuts language, also called Wukchumni.

Marie Wilcox, born 1933, was the last native speaker of Wukchumni. In the early 2000s, she and her daughter Jennifer Malone aimed to create a Wukchumni dictionary. She also worked on an audio dictionary with the aid of her grandson. Wilcox said that her grandparents taught her the language, but when her grandmother died, she had temporarily abandoned the Wukchumni language. When she realized that young tribal members were taking an interest in learning, she worked to make a lexical dictionary. Wilcox and her daughter taught weekly classes around Tulare County. Wilcox was the only fluent speaker of Wukchumni in 2014. She died October 7, 2021.

Due to her efforts, at least three people are fluent in the language as of 2021, and her great-great-grandson is being raised to speak it from birth.
