= Buena Vista Yokuts =

Extinct Yokuts language of California, US

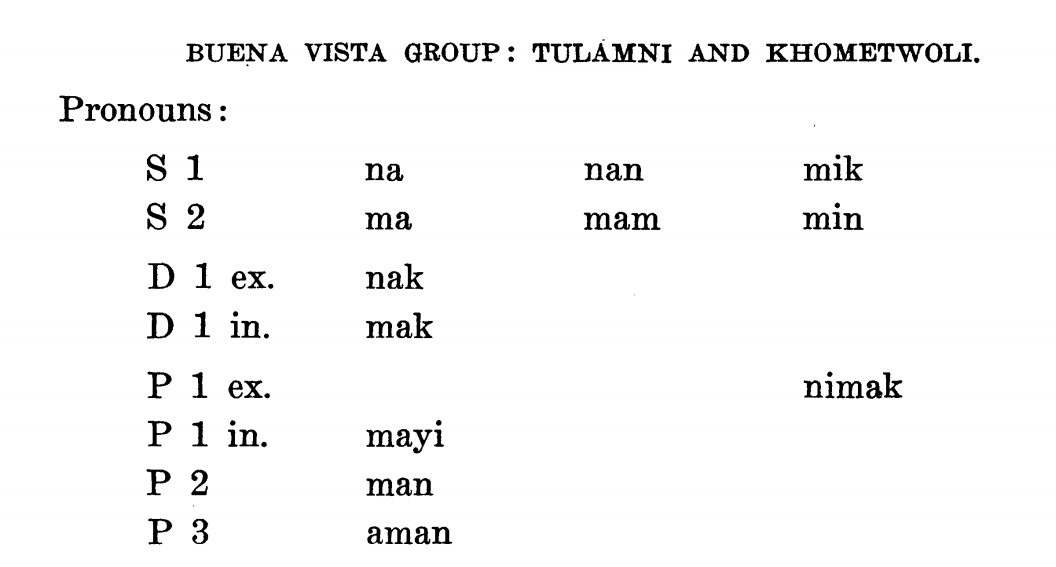
- Pronouns in Buena Vista Yokuts
- Native to: United States
- Region: San Joaquin Valley, California
- Ethnicity: Yokuts people
- Extinct: 1930s
- Language family: Yok-Utian ?: Yokuts; General Yokuts; Buena Vista Yokuts
- Dialects: Tulamni; Hometwoli

Language codes
- ISO 639-3: (included in Yokuts [yok])
- Glottolog: buen1244
- Distribution of Buena Vista Yokuts

Buena Vista was a major dialect of the Yokuts language of California, or possibly a distinct but closely related language. It was spoken in at least two local varieties around Buena Vista Lake in Kern County, California," in the villages of Hometwoli, Loasau, Tuhohi, and Tulamni.

== Dialects ==
Two documented dialects of Buena Vista were Tulamni and Hometwali. Tuhohi (also called Tohohai or Tuhohayi) was a similar dialect, spoken by a tribe who "lived among channels and sloughs of Kern River where they enter Tulare Lake."

A variety of the Barbareño language "was heavily influenced by Buena Vista Yokuts." This language was called Emigdiano, as it was "spoken at San Emigdio near Buena Vista Lake."
