= Gashowu Yokuts =

Extinct Yokutsan language of California

- Native to: California
- Region: San Joaquin Valley
- Ethnicity: Casson
- Era: attested 1931
- Language family: Yok-Utian?: Yokuts; General Yokuts; Nim; Northern Yokuts; Gashowu Yokuts

Language codes
- ISO 639-3: (included in Yokuts yok)
- Glottolog: gash1251 Gashowu
- Historical distribution of Gashowu

Gashowu was a variety of the Yokuts language of California, spoken by the Casson.

== Classification ==
Gashowu occupies a transitional position within the Yokuts languages between the valley and foothill languages.

== Sample text ==
ʔamaˑmaw šeleˑlaw šetʰna maˑxiˑni wilši halaˑxin wilši.
there {to the rock} {wild onion} get {she says} climb {she says}

== See also ==
- Yokutsan languages
