= Thomas Jefferson Mayfield =

Thomas Jefferson Mayfield (1843–1928) led a double life in the early decades of California statehood, living his boyhood as an adopted member of the Choinumni (Choinumne) branch of the Yokuts tribe in the San Joaquin Valley, then rejoining the dominant Anglo-American community throughout his long adulthood.

== Early life ==
Thomas Jefferson Mayfield was born in 1843, in Brazos County, Texas, the youngest of the three sons of William Mayfield and his first wife, Terissa Faller, of Hardeman County, Tennessee. By 1848, his mother had died and his father was remarried, to Maria or Mary Ann Curd. When he was six, his family came to California by voyage round Cape Horn because violence between Texas settlers and Apache made the San Antonio-El Paso Road land route too dangerous. From San Francisco, they made their way by horse and mule pack south through San Jose and over the Pacheco Pass into the Central Valley. Maria Curd Mayfield died shortly after December 1850. William Mayfield went to herd cattle with Jeff's two older brothers and left young Jeff, as he was known, with local Choinumni, Kings River Yokuts Indians who had befriended the family. For the following decade, Jeff, lived in a village across from his families home at the mouth of Sycamore Creek, on Kings River (now under Pine Flat Lake). He had almost no contact with whites and fully assimilated to their native language and culture. Around the age of eighteen, Mayfield rejoined his family and after 1862 surrendered any sustained ties to the Choinumni.

== Later life ==
For the remainder of his long adulthood, Mayfield lived as a sheepherder and prospector. In old age, he settled in the mining town of Tailholt, later White River, today a California ghost town in Tulare County.

Mayfield was known throughout the region as Uncle Jeff, a pioneer with a store of lore and thus brought to the attention of the visiting oral historian and ethnographer Frank F. Latta (1892–1981). Shortly before Mayfield's death, Latta persuaded him to dictate his recollections. Latta published them as a series of newspaper articles, and then, after Mayfield's death in 1928, as San Joaquin Primeval: Uncle Jeff's Story, a rather hastily put-together and somewhat shoddy edition that he tried for many years to improve upon. Although Latta gradually added additional details on Mayfield, as well as related material from his extensive regional research, it was not until 1976 that he was able to release Tailholt Tales as the "complete Mayfield" text. However, current editions rely upon the 1928 book as closer to Thomas Jefferson Mayfield's own understanding of his life as someone once fully native and thereafter part of a culture hostile to traditional ways of life. His oral memoir records a world that was already rapidly vanishing when he encountered it, for by his estimate the Choinumni numbered three hundred in 1850 but no more than forty after 1862.

South Coast Repertory commissioned a musical based on Mayfield's life in 2003 for its theatre for young audiences program, titled 'Indian Summer'; music and lyrics by Emmy-nominated composer Michael Silversher. The touring production was revived again in 2009.
