= Choynimni dialect =

Kings River Yokuts dialect of California

Choynimni
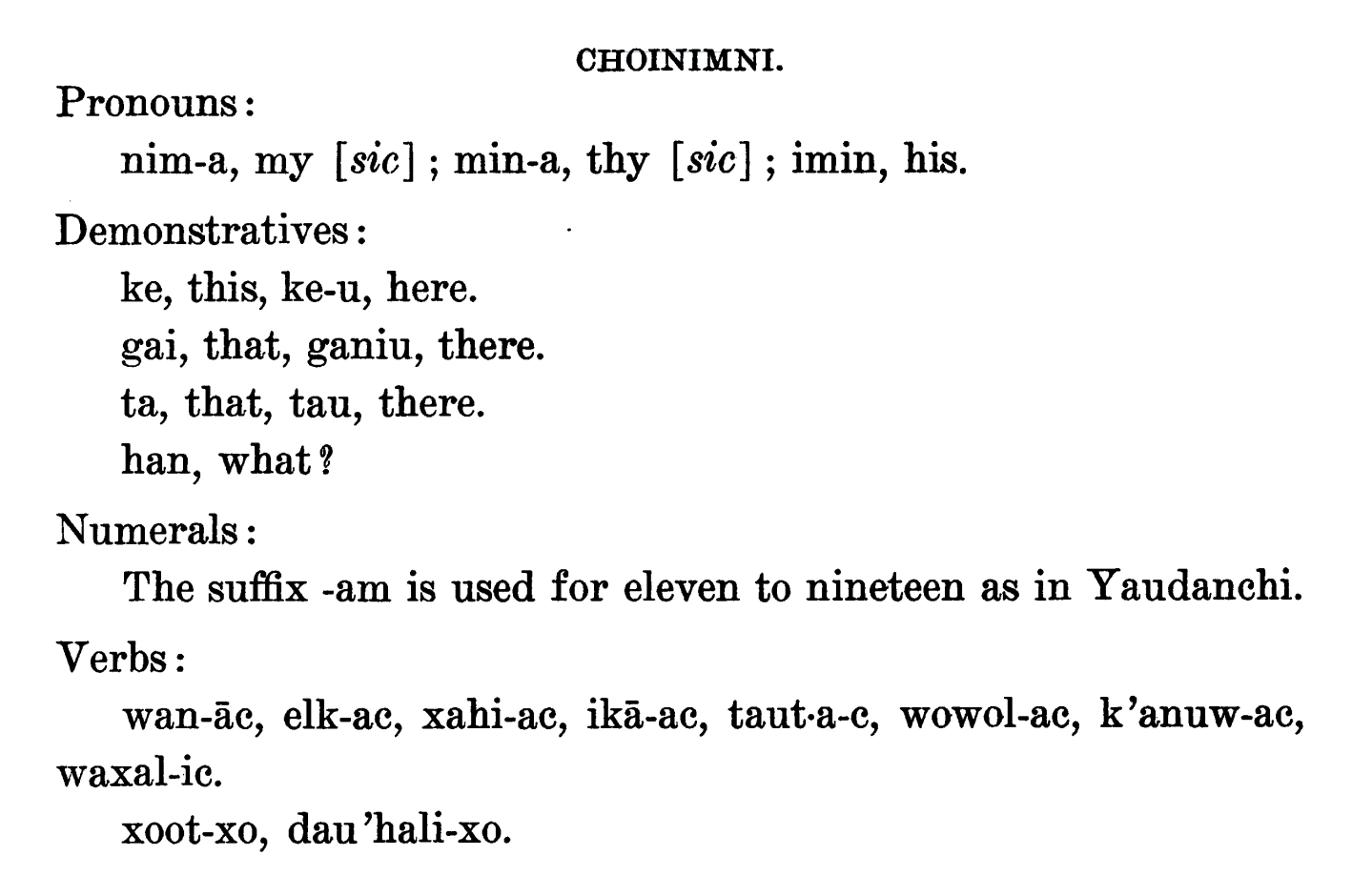
- Information on Choynimni collected by A. L. Kroeber
- Native to: United States
- Region: California
- Ethnicity: Choinumni
- Extinct: 2022 with the death of Jennie Irene Oliver; ~6 with some knowledge
- Language family: Yok-Utian: Yokuts; General Yokuts; Nim; Northern Yokuts; Kings River Yokuts; Choynimni

Language codes
- ISO 639-3: –
- Glottolog: None

Choynimni (also spelled Choinumne) is a dialect of Kings River Yokuts historically spoken along the Kings River between Sanger and Mill Creek (near Piedra). The language is the best documented dialect of Kings River Yokuts.

Information on the language was collected by Clinton Hart Merriam and Stanley Newman.

== Name ==
Linguistic works tend to name this dialect as "Choynimni", though Latta reports based on ethnographic work that this transcription is based on an erroneous pronunciation, and that the correct form is "Choinumne".

== Fluent speakers ==
Jennie Irene Oliver, one of the last fully fluent speakers of Choynimni, died in 2022 at the age of 83. Living members of the tribe retain knowledge of Choynimni including an estimated half dozen speakers.

== Revitalization effort ==
Efforts to revitalize the language have been organized through the California State University, Fresno Department of Linguistics.
