= Marie Wilcox =

Wukchumni speaker and teacher (1933–2021)

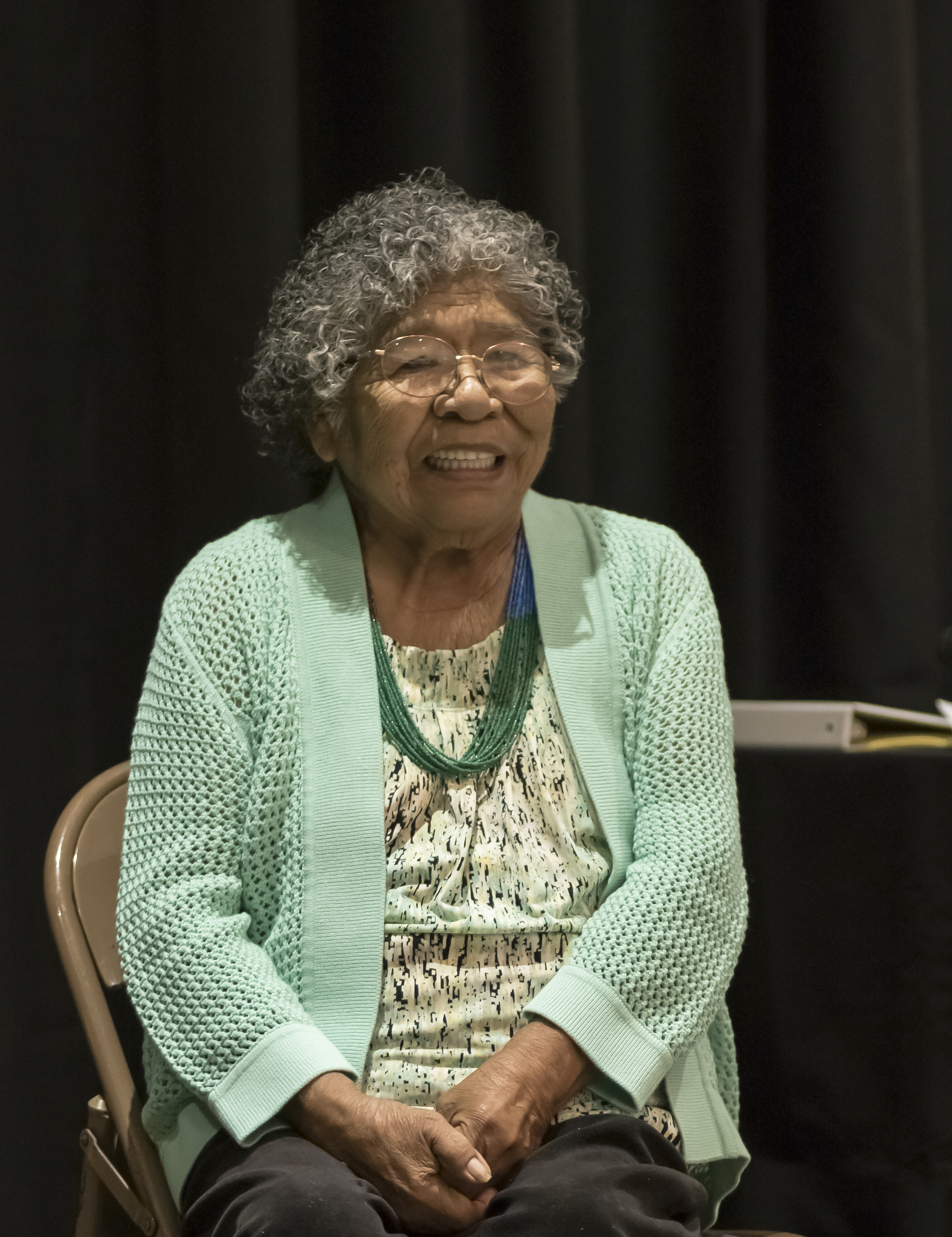
- Wilcox in 2016
- Born: November 24, 1933; Visalia, California
- Died: September 25, 2021 (aged 87); Visalia, California
- Known for: Being the last speaker of Wukchumni Yokuts

Marie Desma Wilcox (November 24, 1933 – September 25, 2021) was a Native American who was the last native speaker of Wukchumni, a dialect of Tule-Kaweah, which is a Yokutsan indigenous language spoken by the Tule-Kaweah Yokuts of California. She worked for more than 20 years on a dictionary of the language.

== Life ==
Wilcox was born on a ranch in Visalia, California, the youngest of seven children of Beatrice Arancis and Alex Wilcox, a farm hand. She was raised by her grandparents in a one-room house in the Venice Hills and after completing eighth grade, she also became a farm hand and a fruit packer. With Joe Garcia, she had four daughters and a son. She lived in Woodlake, California and died in a hospital in Visalia after her aorta ruptured when she was leaving a grandson's birthday party.

== Wukchumni language ==
Wilcox's grandmother spoke Wukchumni; after her death, Wilcox began working on a dictionary of the language as a tribute, with computer and other assistance from Nicholas Luna, an Apache. She included sound recordings of each word in the dictionary, and after the appearance in 2014 of a documentary on her work in the New York Times op-ed section, her family and other members of their tribe became interested in reviving the language. She and her daughter taught it; at the time of her death, Wilcox was teaching classes at the Owens Valley Career Development Center, which are to continue. The dictionary remains unpublished. As of 2014, it was estimated that the Wukchumni tribe had fewer than 200 members. In the early 2010s, when a relative died, Wilcox became the last remaining fluent speaker; at her death, there were at least three, including one of her daughters.
