= Hometwoli dialect =

Extinct Yokutsan language

Hometwoli
- Humetwadi, Khometwoli
- Native to: United States
- Region: California
- Era: attested 1917
- Language family: Yok-Utian: Yokutsan; General Yokuts; Buena Vista; Hometwoli

Language codes
- ISO 639-3: –
- Glottolog: home1246

Hometwoli (also known as Humetwadi) was a dialect of Buena Vista Yokuts spoken in the southern portion of the Tulare Basin of California near Kern Lake.

Out of the group of Yokuts dialects designated by Kroeber as "Foothill Yokuts," Hometwoli was reportedly the most divergent.

== Name ==
Hometwoli means "Southerners" and is a variant of the term Homtinin, used by multiple Yokuts peoples to refer to their southern neighbors.

== Phonology ==
Hometwoli is the only dialect of Buena Vista Yokuts with central vowel phonemes.

== Counting system ==
Hometwoli varies from other Yokutsan languages in its word for "six," which derives from the same word stem in all other dialects. The Hometwoli word for "six" shows similarities with the word for "nine" in other Yokutsan dialects and may suggest the presence of a base six system.
