= Choinumni =

Tribe of Yokuts indigenous people of California

The Choinumni are one of the many tribes of the Yokuts people that live in the San Joaquin Valley of California. The Choinumni live on the Kings River. Their culture is especially well known from the account of Thomas Jefferson Mayfield who was raised among them, at a village, opposite the mouth of Sycamore Creek, on the south bank of the Kings River, just above, what is now Trimmer, California in the 1850s until 1861. They spoke the Choynimni language. Currently a small living community exists interspersed around Fresno county and surrounding areas.
