= Cartridge Creek =

Coordinates: 36.99688°N 118.58871°W

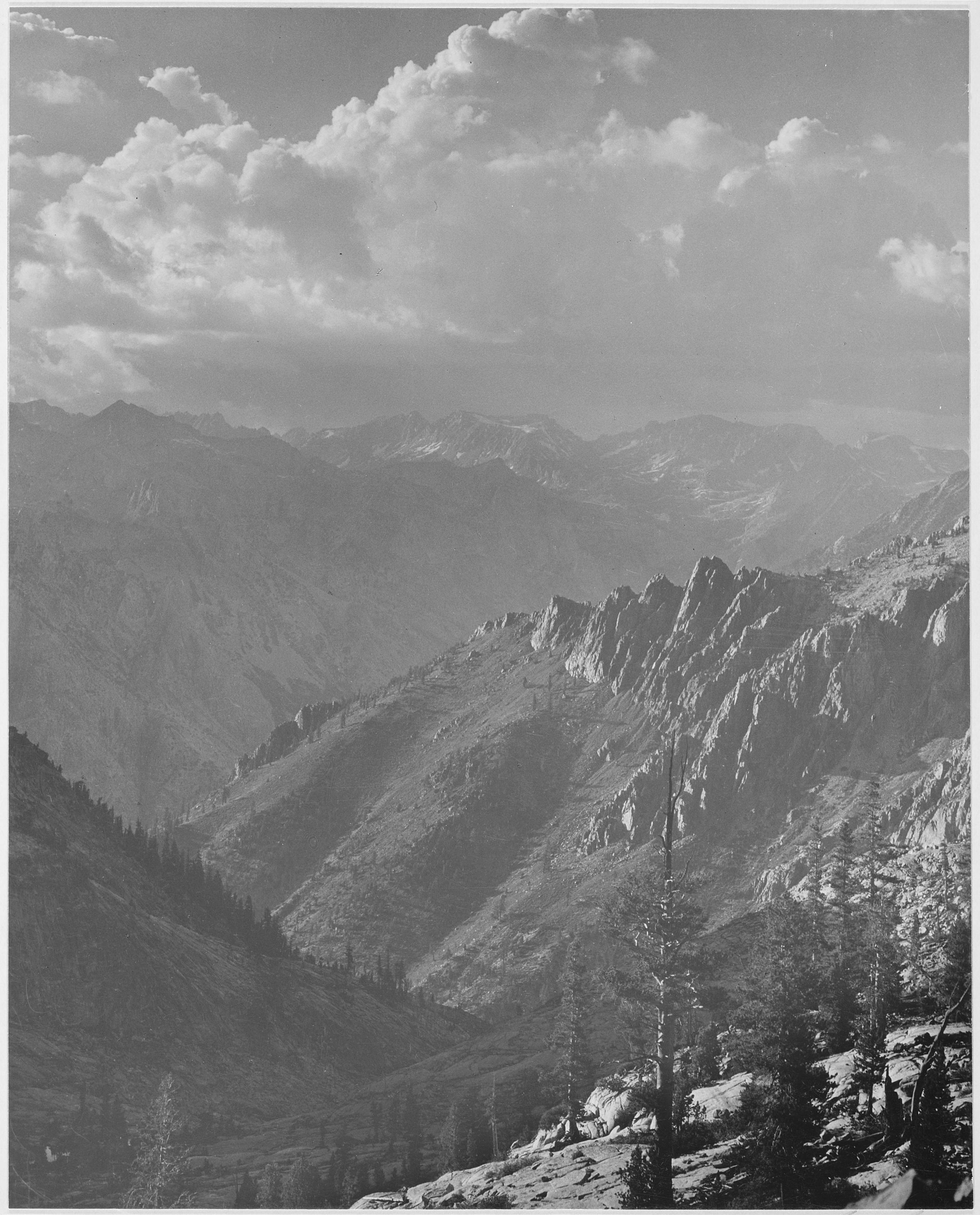
- A photograph taken by Ansel Adams of the Middle Fork Kings River from the south fork of Cartridge Creek
- Etymology: Frank Lewis named it in the 1870s after a bear hunt that used many gun cartridges.

Location
- Country: United States
- State: California

Physical characteristics
- Mouth: Middle Fork Kings River

Basin features
- Cities: Fresno, California, United States

Cartridge Creek is a creek near Fresno, California. It terminates in the Middle Fork Kings River. The creek is part of Kings Canyon National Park. A pass above the headwaters of the creek has an old sheep trail over it. The creek was named by Frank Lewis while on a hunting trip in the 1870s. The following quote records the event: "While hunting with a young friend, Harrison Hill, I wounded a bear and told him to finish it. He became excited and threw all the shells out of his Winchester without firing a shot."
