= Yokuts language =

Endangered language of California, US

Yokuts
- Mariposa
- Native to: United States
- Region: San Joaquin Valley, California
- Ethnicity: Yokuts
- Native speakers: 50 (including semispeakers) (2007)
- Language family: Yok-Utian?: Yokuts
- Dialects: Palewyami †; Buena Vista †; Tule–Kaweah †; Gashowu †; Kings River †; Valley

Language codes
- ISO 639-3: yok
- Glottolog: yoku1255
- ELP: Yokuts
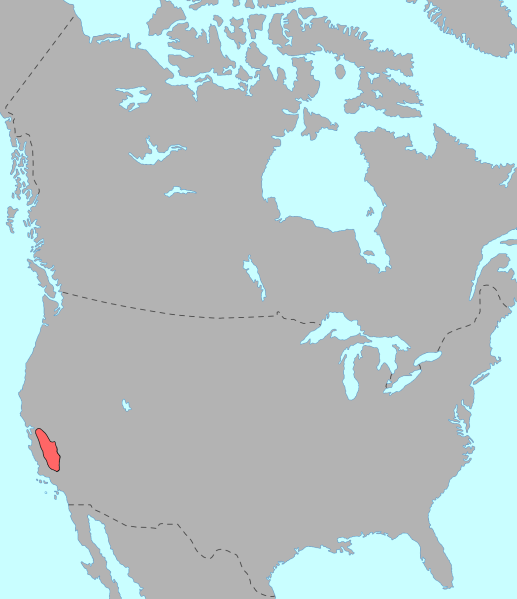
- Pre-contact distribution of the Yokuts language

Yokuts (/ˈjoʊkəts/), formerly known as Mariposa, is an endangered language spoken in the interior of Northern and Central California in and around the San Joaquin Valley by the Yokuts people. The speakers of Yokuts were severely affected by disease, missionaries, and the Gold Rush. While descendants of Yokuts speakers currently number in the thousands, all constituent dialects apart from Valley Yokuts are now extinct.

Map of Yokuts with dialects indicated

The Yawelmani dialect of Valley Yokuts, the only surviving branch, has been a focus of much linguistic research.

== Dialects ==
The Yokuts language consists of half a dozen primary dialects. An estimated forty linguistically distinct groups existed before Euro-American contact.

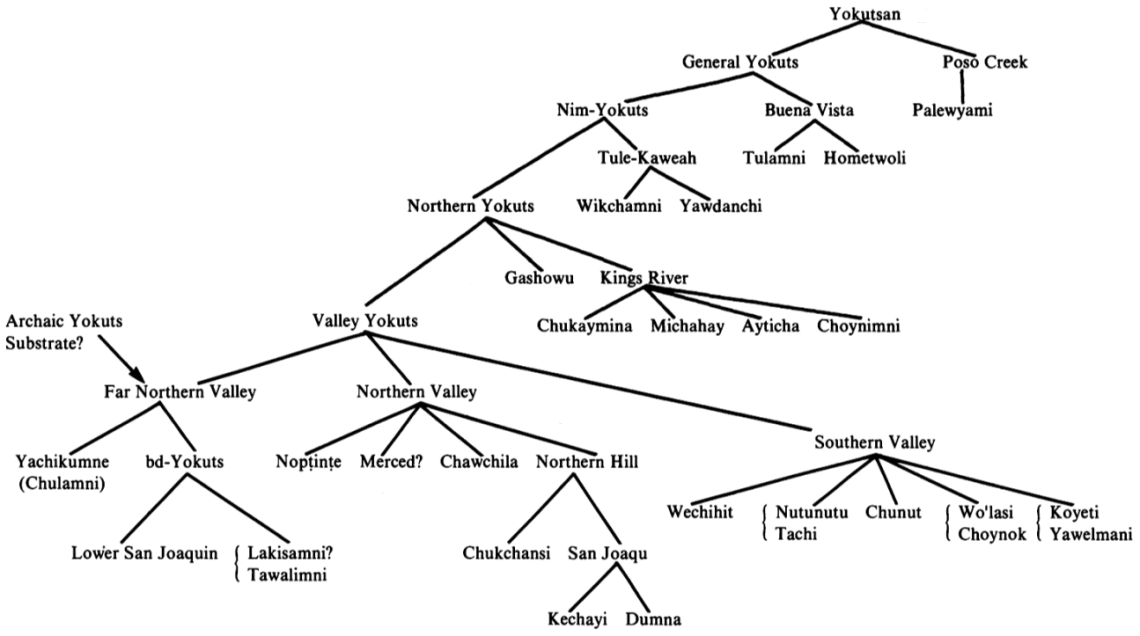
Yokutsan family tree

- Yokuts
  - † Poso Creek
    - † Palewyami Yokuts (a.k.a. Poso Creek, Altinin)
  - General Yokuts (all others)
    - † Buena Vista
      - † Tulamni
      - † Hometwali
    - Nim
      - † Tule–Kaweah
        - † Wukchumni
        - † Yawdanchi (a.k.a. Nutaa)
        - † Bokninuwad
      - Northern Yokuts
        - † Gashowu
        - † Kings River
          - † Chukaymina (also spelled Chukaimina)
          - † Michahay
          - † Ayitcha (a.k.a. Aiticha, Kocheyali)
          - † Choynimni (also spelled Choinimni)
        - Valley Yokuts (sole living dialect)

Glottolog concludes that these dialects fall into four distinct languages: Palewyami Yokuts, Buena Vista Yokuts, Northern Yokuts, Tule–Kaweah Yokuts.

== Speakers and language revitalization ==
Almost all Yokuts dialects are extinct, as noted above. Those that are still spoken are endangered.

Until recent years, Choinimni, Wikchamni, Chukchansi, Kechayi, Tachi and Yawelmani all had a few fluent speakers and a variable number of partial speakers. Choynimni went extinct in 2017. Wikchamni, Chukchansi, Tachi, and Yawelmani were being taught to at least a few children during the first decade of the 21st century.

Chukchansi is now a written language, with its own alphabet developed on a federal grant. Chukchansi also has a phrase book and dictionary that are partially completed. In May 2012, the Linguistics Department of Fresno State University received a $1 million grant to compile a Chukchansi dictionary and grammar texts, and to "provide support for scholarships, programs, and efforts to assemble native texts and create a curriculum for teaching the language so it can be brought back into social and ritual use."

== Genetic relations ==
Yokuts is a key member in the proposed Penutian language stock. Some linguists consider most relationships within Penutian to be undemonstrated (cf. Campbell 1997). Others consider a genetic relationship between Yokuts, Utian, Maiduan, Wintuan, and a number of Oregon languages to be definite (cf. DeLancey and Golla 1997). Regardless of higher-order disagreement, Callaghan (1997) provides strong evidence uniting Yokuts and the Utian languages as branches of a Yok-Utian language family.

The term "Delta Yokuts" has recently been introduced in lieu of the longer "Far Northern Valley Yokuts" for the dialect spoken by the people in the present Stockton and Modesto vicinities of San Joaquin and Stanislaus counties, California, prior to their removal to Mission San Jose between 1810 and 1827. Of interest, Delta Yokuts contains a large number of words with no cognates in any of the other dialects, or for that matter in the adjacent Utian languages, although its syntax is typically Northern Valley Yokuts. This anomaly has led Whistler (cited by Golla 2007) to suggest, "The vocabulary distinctive of some of the Delta Yokuts dialects may reflect substratal influence from pre-proto-Yokuts or from an extinct Yok-Utian language." Golla suggests that a "pre-proto-Yokuts" homeland was in the Great Basin, citing a rich plant and animal vocabulary for a dry environment and a close connection between Yokuts basketry styles and those of prehistoric central Nevada.

== Proto-language ==
Proto-Yokuts
- Reconstruction of: Yokuts languages

Proto-Yokuts reconstructions from Whistler and Golla (1986):

gloss	Proto-Yokuts
acorn	*pʰutʰuʂ
beaver	*t’ɨːpɨkʰ ~ *ʈ’ɨːpɨkʰ
blood	*hɨːpa-ʔ
bone	*c’iy
child	*witʰip
child (diminutive)	*wicʰip
coyote	*kʰay’iw
eight	*mun’us
eye	*sasa-ʔ
fingernail	*xiːsix
fire	*ʔoʂitʰ
fish	*lopʰiʈʰ
flea	*p’aːk’il
friend	*noːcʰi
head louse	*tʰihiʈʰ
heart	*ʔuʂik’
horn	*ɨʂɨl’
mountain	*lomitʰ
mouth	*sama-ʔ
north	*xosim
nose	*ʈʰɨŋɨk’
shaman	*ʔaŋʈʰiw
skunk	*cʰox
sky	*ʈʰipʰin
star	*c’ayatas
string	*c’ikiy
tears	*maŋal
three	*ʂoːpʰin
two	*poŋiy
water	*ʔilik’

== See also ==
- Yokuts people
