= Wukchumni dialect =

Yokuts language

Wukchumni
- Wikchamni
- Native to: United States
- Region: California
- Ethnicity: Wukchumni
- Extinct: September 25, 2021, with the death of Marie Wilcox
- Revival: L2: 3 fluent (2021)
- Language family: Yok-Utian: Yokutsan; General Yokuts; Nim; Tule-Kaweah Yokuts; Wukchumni
- Writing system: Latin

Language codes
- ISO 639-3: –
- Glottolog: wikc1234

Wukchumni or Wikchamni is a variety of Tule-Kaweah Yokuts that was historically spoken by the Wukchumni people of the east fork of the Kaweah River of California.

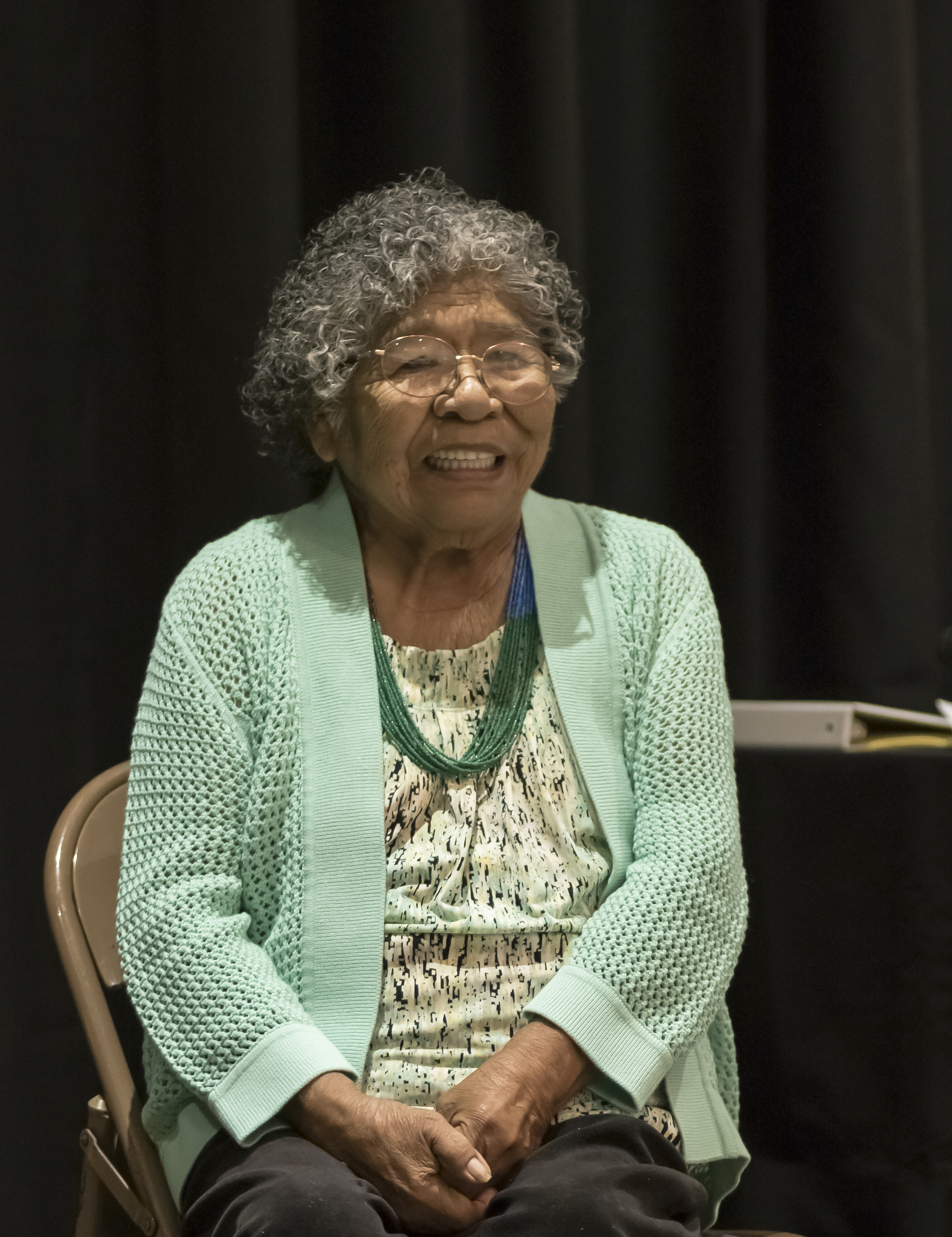
Marie Wilcox, the language’s last native speaker, in 2016

As of 2014, Marie Wilcox (1933–2021) was the last remaining native speaker of the language. There are efforts at revitalization, and Wilcox completed a comprehensive Wukchumni dictionary; at her death there were at least three fluent speakers.

== Status ==
In 2019, Wukchumni was categorized as 8a or "moribund", where few elderly speakers are present, on the Expanded Graded Intergenerational Disruption Scale. It became extinct upon the death of its last native speaker, Marie Wilcox, in 2021.

== Revitalization efforts ==
In the early 2000s, Marie Wilcox, aided by her daughter Jennifer Malone, began compiling a Wukchumni dictionary. The work was copyrighted in 2019, but has not been published. Wilcox and Malone held classes teaching beginner and intermediate Wukchumni to interested tribal members; Malone continues this teaching at Owens Valley Career Development Center.

Efforts to revive Wukchumni have additionally been organized through the Master-Apprentice Language Learning Program.

=== Possibility of more native speakers ===
Due to Wilcox's efforts, at least three people are fluent in the language. Destiny Treglown, Marie Wilcox's great-granddaughter, is raising her child, Oliver, as a Wukchumni speaker. If he reaches fluency, he will become the first native speaker of the language in four generations.

== Phonology ==
The following tables are based on Gamble (1978).

=== Consonants ===
		Bilabial	Dental/ Alveolar	Post- alveolar	Velar	Glottal
Plosive	voiceless	p	t̪	ʈ	k	ʔ
Plosive	aspirated	pʰ	t̪ʰ	ʈʰ	kʰ	
Plosive	ejective	pʼ	t̪ʼ	ʈʼ	kʼ	
Affricate	voiceless			t͡ʃ		
Affricate	aspirated			t͡ʃʰ		
Affricate	ejective			t͡ʃʼ		
Fricative			s	ʃ	x	h
Nasal	plain	m	n		ŋ	
Nasal	glottalized	mˀ	nˀ		ŋˀ	
Approximant	plain	w	l	j		
Approximant	glottalized	wˀ	lˀ	jˀ		

Allophones of /ʃ, x/ include [ʒ̊, xʷ].

=== Vowels ===
	Front	Central	Back
Close	i iː	ɨ̹ ɨ̹ː	u uː
Mid	e eː	ə̹ ə̹ː	o oː
Open		a aː	

A long vowel /eː/ can be lowered to [æː] when occurring before an /n/. The central vowels /ɨ/ and /ə/ are partially rounded.

All phonetic short vowel allophones include [ɪ], [ɛ], [ɨ̞], [ɜ], [ʌ], [o̞], [ʊ].
