= Trimmer, California =

Unincorporated community in California, United States

Trimmer
- Unincorporated community
- Location in California Trimmer (the United States)
- Coordinates: 36°54′18″N 119°17′46″W
- Country: United States
- State: California
- County: Fresno
- Elevation: 1,030 ft (314 m)

Trimmer is an unincorporated community in Fresno County, California, United States. It is located 8 miles (13 km) north-northeast of Piedra, at an elevation of 1030 feet (314 m).

Originally located on the Kings River, a post office operated at Trimmer from 1889 to 1890, from 1892 to 1919, moving in 1894 and 1895. The name honors Morris Trimmer, who opened a resort called Trimmer Springs before 1911. The site of the resort is now covered by the waters of Pine Flat Reservoir. but the new community is located along the lakeside above the old site.
