= Arrow Peak (California) =

Mountain in California, United States

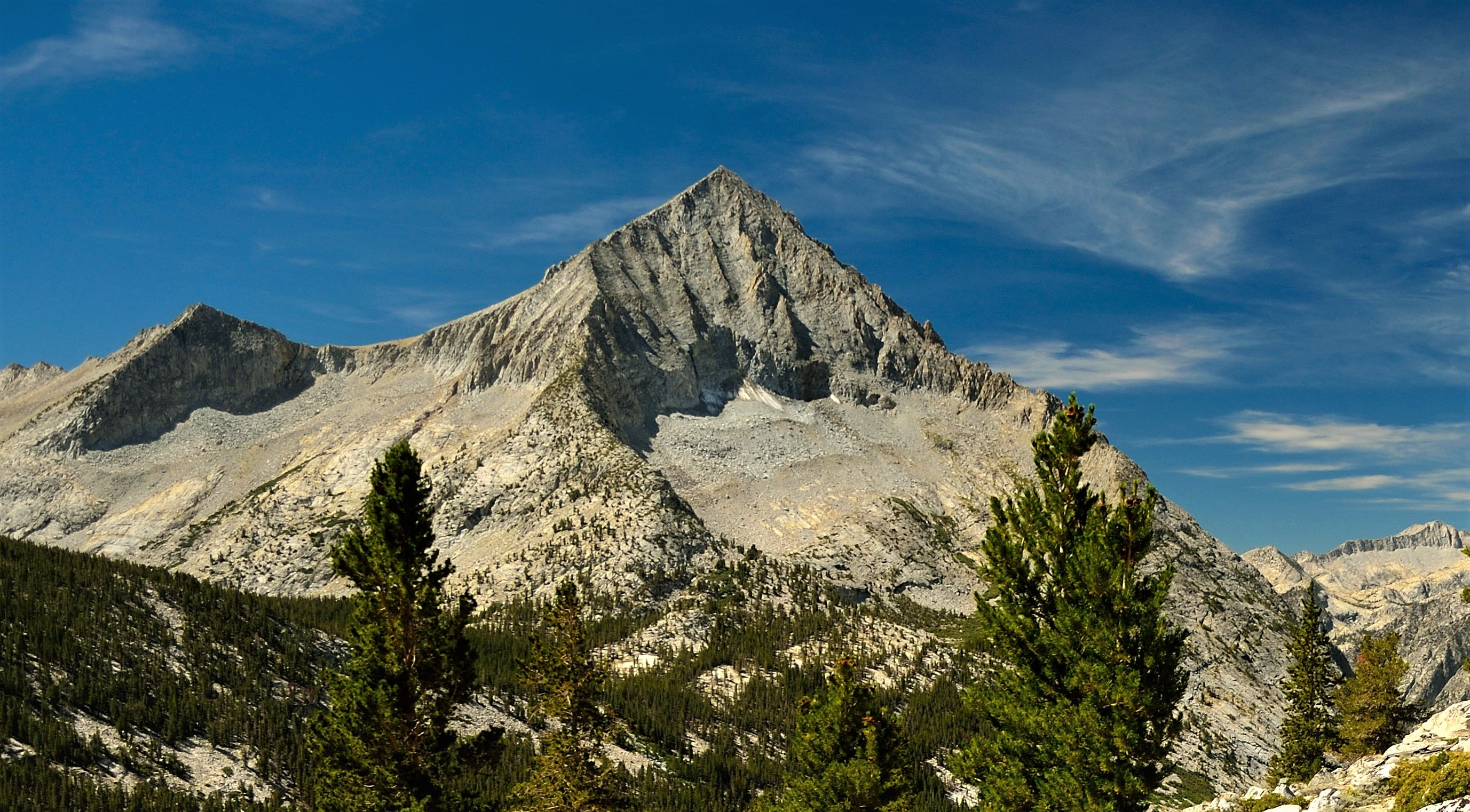

Highest point
- Elevation: 12,962 ft (3,951 m)
- Prominence: 1,313 ft (400 m)
- Parent peak: Mount Pinchot
- Isolation: 4.6 mi (7.4 km)
- Listing: SPS Mountaineers Peak
- Coordinates: 36°55′43″N 118°29′27″W

Geography
- Location within California
- Country: United States of America
- State: California
- County: Fresno
- Parent range: Sierra Nevada

Climbing
- First ascent: Bolton Brown (1895)

Arrow Peak is a 12,962-foot (3,951 m) summit of the Sierra Nevada in Fresno County, California, located within Kings Canyon National Park. Arrow Peak is situated at the north end of the Muro Blanco (also known as Arrow Ridge), a chain of high cliffs along the South Fork Kings River.

== See also ==
- List of mountain peaks of California
