= Pine Flat Dam =

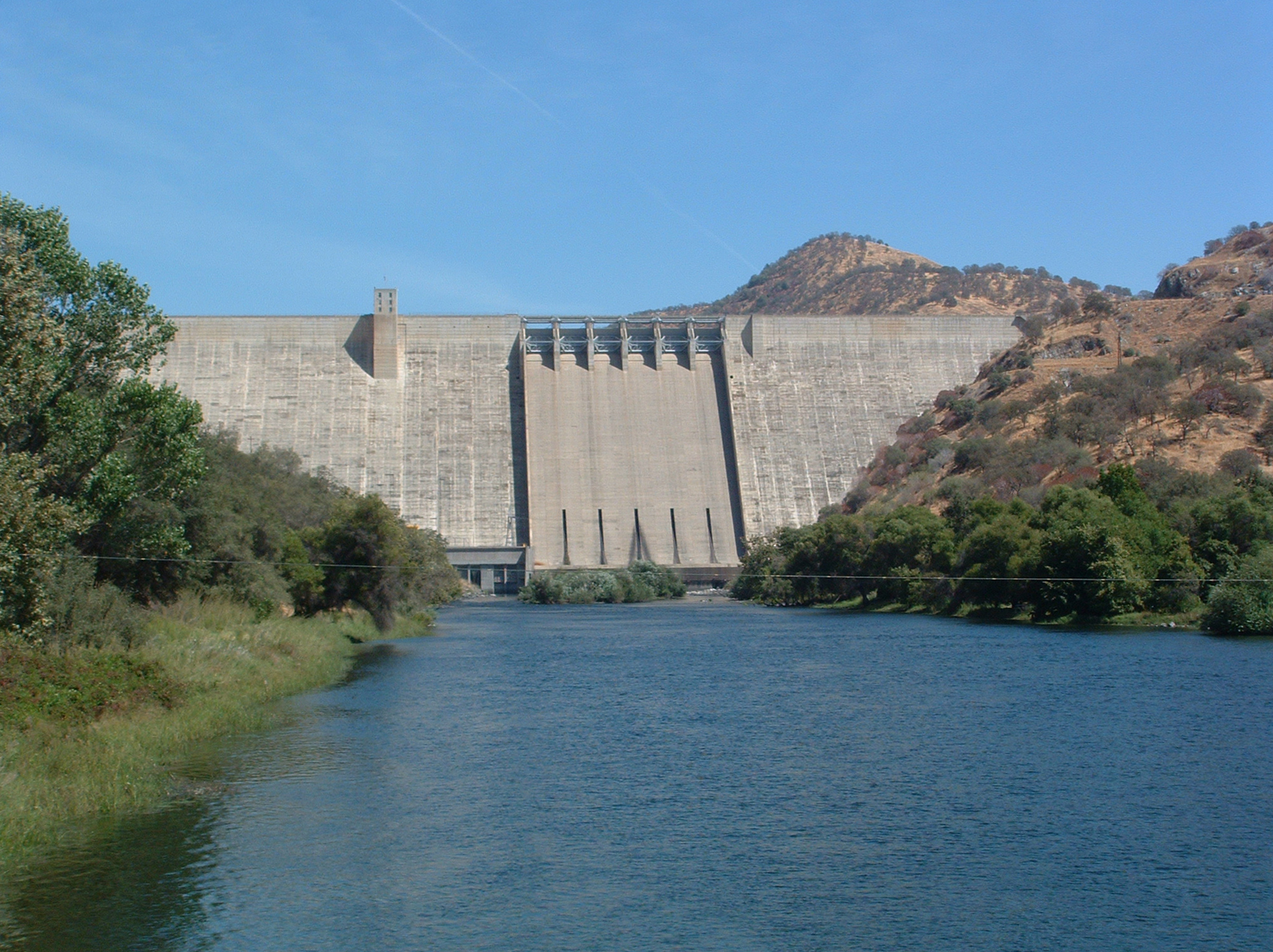
- Pine Flat Dam in Fresno County, California
- Interactive map of Pine Flat Dam
- Country: United States
- Location: Fresno County, California, U.S.
- Coordinates: 36°49′56″N 119°19′34″W
- Status: Operational
- Construction began: 1947; 79 years ago
- Opening date: 1954; 72 years ago
- Owners: U.S. Army Corps of Engineers, Sacramento District

Dam and spillways
- Type of dam: Concrete gravity
- Impounds: Kings River
- Height: 440 ft (130 m)
- Length: 1,840 ft (560 m)

Reservoir
- Creates: Pine Flat Lake
- Total capacity: 1,000,000 acre⋅ft (1.2 km^{3})
- Inactive capacity: 45,379 acre⋅ft (0.055974 km^{3})
- Catchment area: 1,545 mi^{2} (4,000 km^{2})
- Surface area: 5,970 acres (2,420 ha)
- Maximum water depth: 429 ft (131 m)
- Normal elevation: 955 ft (291 m) (max)

Power Station
- Operator: Kings River Conservation District
- Hydraulic head: 424 ft (129 m)
- Turbines: 3x 55MW Francis
- Installed capacity: 165 MW
- Annual generation: 387,256,000 kWh (2001–2012)
- Website; U.S. Army Corps of Engineers - Pine Flat Lake Project

Pine Flat Dam is a concrete gravity dam on the Kings River in the Central Valley of Fresno County, California United States. Situated about 28 miles (45 km) east of Fresno, the dam is 440 feet (130 m) high and impounds Pine Flat Lake, in the foothills of the Sierra Nevada just outside the boundary of Kings Canyon National Park. The dam's primary purpose is flood control, with irrigation, hydroelectric power generation and recreation secondary in importance.

The dam was built by the U.S. Army Corps of Engineers (USACE) after a six-year controversy between supporters of irrigation development and proponents of flood control. Construction began in 1947 and was completed in 1954. Since then, the dam has prevented millions of dollars in flood damages and fostered extensive development of agriculture on the fertile floodplain of the Kings River; after 1984 it has also generated hydroelectricity. The increased irrigation allowed by the dam has also led to the destruction of some of North America's most extensive wetland habitats.

== History ==
=== Background ===
The first serious proposal to dam the Kings River was made in the 1890s by engineer J.B. Lippincott, who surveyed and envisioned the development of a 185,000-acre-foot (0.228 km^{3}) reservoir on the river. By 1914 the proposed dam gained strong support from area farmers and water districts, who formed the Kings River Water Association (KRWA) in 1927 to allocate river water for the irrigation of 958,000 acres (388,000 ha) of the San Joaquin Valley on the alluvial plain of the Kings River. In 1937, the KRWA appealed to the federal government to provide financial aid and support the construction of a large dam at Pine Flat.

Starting in 1938, two government agencies – the USACE and the U.S. Bureau of Reclamation (USBR) – fought it out for the construction of Pine Flat Dam. With the support of President Franklin D. Roosevelt, the USBR wanted to incorporate the dam as part of its fledgling Central Valley Project (CVP), which intended to develop the rivers of the Central Valley for irrigation. The USACE objected to the bureau's plans, mainly because the primary purpose of the dam would be flood control. Some area farmers were also against the integration of Pine Flat Dam into the CVP, as under "reclamation law" individual farmers could not receive more water than was necessary for the irrigation of 160 acres (65 ha). All of the water in the Kings River was already appropriated to local irrigators, many of whom owned more land than the USBR limit.

=== Pre-construction controversies ===
By 1940 the water users of the Kings River were leaning towards letting the USACE build the dam, in light of the continual water-rights problems associated with the USBR's plans, in addition to full federal funding offered by the USACE. The Flood Control Act of 1944 cemented this decision, authorizing the construction of four dams in the Tulare Lake basin of the San Joaquin Valley – Pine Flat, Terminus, Success and Isabella – as a USACE undertaking. The president signed a bill appropriating preliminary funds for Pine Flat Dam on April 2, 1945, but only "reluctantly" and "[with the emphasis] that he'd try to avoid dispensing any more money to the army for the dam". Roosevelt planned to take the Pine Flat issue to Congress, but never got the chance – he died of a brain hemorrhage just ten days later at his home in Georgia.

Roosevelt's successor, Harry S. Truman, was also adamant that Pine Flat Dam be built for irrigation. Truman impounded the initial funds for the dam's construction and promised not to release it until the USACE and USBR could reach an agreement on the proportions of funding that would go to irrigation and flood control. To further complicate the situation, Truman insisted that the USBR negotiate the contracts for irrigation water from Pine Flat Dam with KRWA farmers. In a last-ditch effort to secure the Pine Flat project, the USBR revoked its acreage limit from the entirety of the Kings River service area and the Tulare Lake bed. After two years of legal battles, the share of project cost devoted to irrigation was settled at $14.25 million, less than half of the dam's $33.5 million price tag. On February 18, 1947, the president released the funds, finally allowing construction on Pine Flat Dam to begin.

=== Construction ===
On May 27, 1947, the USACE held the groundbreaking ceremony for Pine Flat Dam, which was attended by more than 2,000 people. Governor Earl Warren set off the first blast at the dam site with the turn of a switch, detonating forty charges of dynamite on the south side of the Kings River gorge. In order to bring construction materials to the site, a temporary railroad was constructed along the Kings River. Concrete was brought to the dam site by a pair of portable concrete mixers on a flatcar, and pumped into place via a 48-foot (15 m) long tunnel also mounted on a train car. In November 1950, floodwaters tore through the construction site, contributing to a serious late-season flood event that caused $20–25 million of damage in the San Joaquin Valley. This was the last major flood event on the Kings River before the completion of Pine Flat Dam, which would have "prevented much damage… had [it] been completed".

In 1951, a cofferdam was constructed to divert the Kings River along the north side of the canyon to allow the construction of the dam's foundations. In July, the river was blocked from this temporary channel and flowed through the dam's bottom sluice gates for the first time, permitting the northern section of the dam to be built in the former diversion channel. Pine Flat Dam's main structure was built in 37 vertical sections of large concrete forms or "monoliths" that were secured by temporary steel scaffolding that was removed after the concrete cured.

By 1953, the dam was high enough to begin impounding the river and flows through the sluice gates were cut, and the lake began to fill. The final cost of Pine Flat Dam was $42.3 million, exceeding the projected cost by more than 25 percent. On May 22, 1954, 3,000 people attended the dedication of Pine Flat Dam. This was far short of the predicted crowd of 15,000. Because of the conflict between local farmers, the USACE and the USBR, "perhaps more citizens would have been present if they had felt that it was really their dam, that they had more to celebrate."

== Post-construction events ==
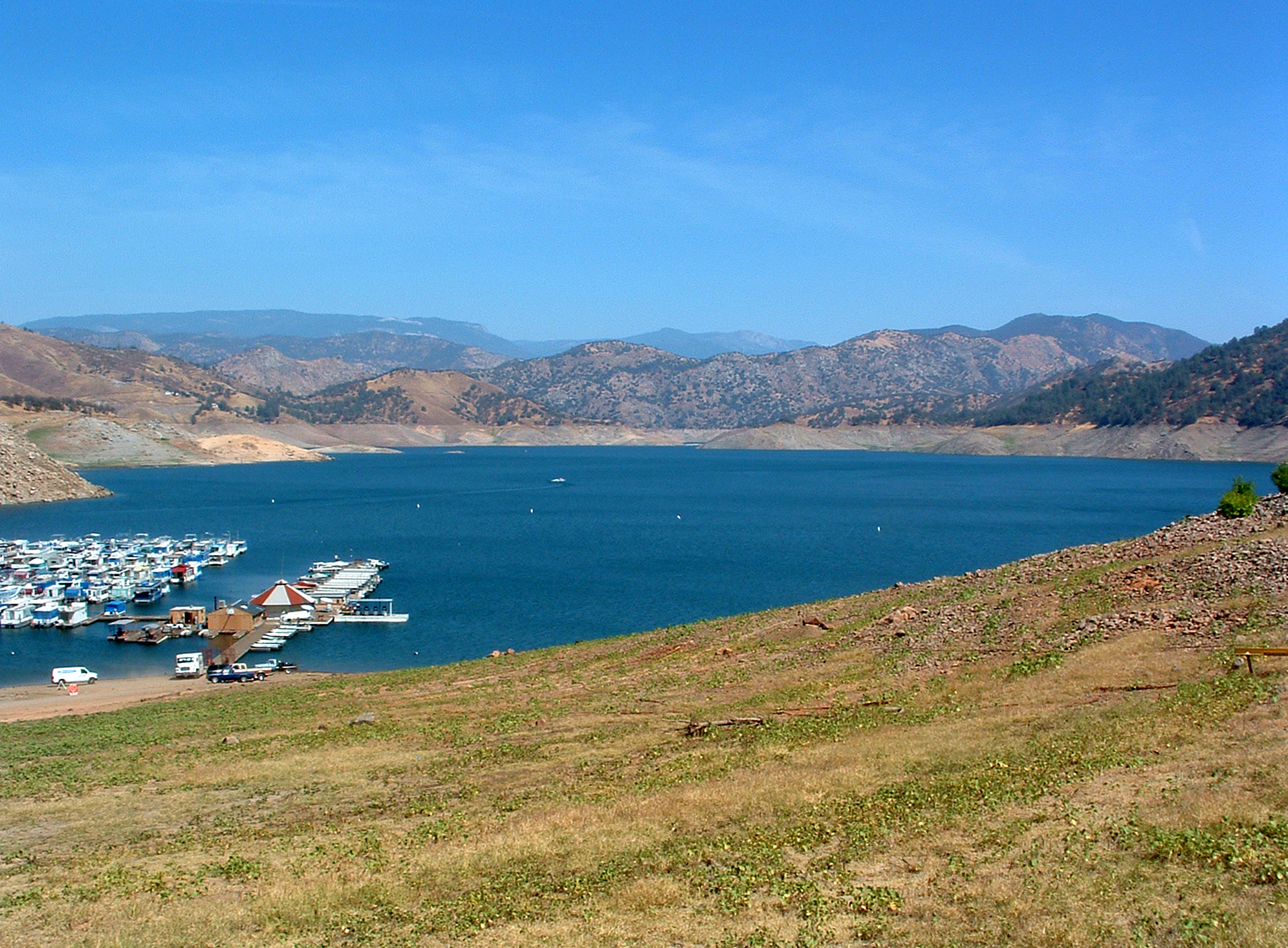
Pine Flat Lake

Less than two years after completion, Pine Flat Dam halted "what would have been at the time the greatest Kings River flood ever measured" in late November 1955, when the Kings River reached a peak inflow into the reservoir of 112,000 cu ft/s (3,200 m^{3}/s). In January 1969, the highest releases ever from Pine Flat Dam, 17,100 cu ft/s (480 m^{3}/s), occurred in the wake of a flood that reached a less impressive peak of 80,000 cu ft/s (2,300 m^{3}/s) but had a much greater volume than the 1955 rain flood. The dam's contribution to reducing the impact of floods has allowed greater diversion of Kings River flows for irrigation, and along with other smaller dams in the southern San Joaquin Valley, has contributed to the desiccation of the once-expansive wetlands of Tulare Lake. The lake, which once comprised nearly 500,000 acres (200,000 ha) of seasonal open water and wetlands, was reduced to less than 27,000 acres (11,000 ha) by 1960.

During the 1969 rains local residents clamored for floodwaters from Pine Flat Lake to be diverted to Tulare lakebed. Representation on the irrigation district board, however, was determined by the value of landowners’ land and J. G. Boswell Company owned the majority of land in the district. J. G. Boswell Co. voted to block the floodwater diversion so that its crops on the Buena Vista lakebed would not be destroyed.

Residents whose homes were destroyed by the flood sued. Limiting suffrage to landowners violated the one man, one vote guarantee in the U.S. Constitution, they alleged, because the irrigation district can levy taxes, exercise eminent domain, and decide whose land gets flooded. In 1973 a divided United States Supreme Court disagreed, finding that a private company can exercise control of the irrigation district because flood control is not an important government function.

In the early 1970s, the Kings River Conservation District (KRCD) proposed a system of new dams and power plants to further develop the water resources of the Kings River watershed. These included a new power station at Pine Flat Dam, a 600-foot (180 m) dam at Rodgers Crossing upstream of Pine Flat Lake and a reservoir at Piedra to regulate Pine Flat Dam releases. The only part of the project to be completed was the Jeff L. Taylor Pine Flat Power Plant at the base of Pine Flat Dam, which went into operation in 1984.

Following the September 11 attacks in New York City, Pine Flat Dam was closed to all public access because of its importance in protecting the region from floods and the damage that the impounded water would do if the dam was breached.

== Design and operations ==
Pine Flat Dam is a solid concrete gravity structure that stands 440 feet (130 m) high from foundations and 424 feet (129 m) high above the Kings River. At an elevation of 951.5 feet (290.0 m), the reservoir has a capacity of 1,000,000 acre-feet (1.2 km^{3}) and covers 5,970 acres (2,420 ha), stretching 21 miles (34 km) up the river with 67 miles (108 km) of shoreline. The spillway consists of six bays each controlled by a 36x42 foot (11x13 m) tainter gate, and has a capacity of 391,000 cubic feet per second (11,100 m^{3}/s) at full reservoir elevation. The dam's hydroelectric power station contains three 55 megawatt (MW) Francis turbines with a combined capacity of 165 MW. The plant produces about 420 million kilowatt hours (KWh) annually, enough to supply the needs of about 47,000 households.

The dam and reservoir serve the primary purpose of flood control, so its flood-control reservation is large at 475,000 acre-feet (0.586 km^{3}), nearly half of the reservoir's capacity. The dam provides flood protection to about 300 square miles (780 km^{2}) of land and is operated to maintain a maximum downstream discharge of 4,750 cubic feet per second (135 m^{3}/s) at Crescent Weir, a water diversion structure on the Kings River about 6 miles (9.7 km) northwest of Lemoore. Due to the limited capacity of the reservoir, dam operators are often forced to release flows that exceed this limit in high runoff years, including in 1969, 1978, and 1986. In the 1969 floods, 1,017,000 acre-feet (1.254 km^{3}) of water – greater than the entire capacity of Pine Flat Lake – poured over the dam's spillway. An average of 200,000 acre-feet (0.25 km^{3}) of water is spilled each year, reducing valuable irrigation water supplies and causing flooding, because Pine Flat Dam is unable to contain it. This has prompted plans to raise the dam, which would increase the storage capacity by up to 124,000 acre-feet (0.153 km^{3}), all of which would be added to the flood-control pool. Increasing the height of the dam would also allow for development of more water resources for irrigation and greater power generation.

The dam is also operated to maintain base flows in the Kings River during low water summers for wildlife conservation purposes. On September 11, 1964, the California Department of Fish and Game and the KRWA signed an agreement that established a minimum release of 50 to 100 cubic feet per second (1.4 to 2.8 m^{3}/s), which can be reduced to 25 cubic feet per second (0.71 m^{3}/s) if inflows from downstream tributaries exceed that amount.

== See also ==
- List of dams and reservoirs in California
- List of largest reservoirs of California
- List of power stations in California
- List of the tallest dams in the United States

== Works cited ==
- Arax, Mark; Wartzman, Rick (2005). The King of California: J.G. Boswell and the Making of A Secret American Empire. PublicAffairs. ISBN 1-58648-281-5.
- Billington, David P.; Jackson, Donald Conrad (2006). Big Dams of the New Deal Era: A Confluence of Engineering and Politics. University of Oklahoma Press. ISBN 0-80613-795-9.
- Garone, Philip (2011). The Fall and Rise of the Wetlands of California's Great Central Valley. University of California Press. ISBN 978-0-52026-663-6.
- Taylor, Paul S. (1955). North, Robert C.; Mirrielees, Edith R; et al. (eds.). Spectator Sampler: Selections from: The Pacific Spectator, Volumes I to X. Stanford University Press.
