= Piedra, California =

Unincorporated community in California, United States

Piedra
- Unincorporated community
- Location in California Piedra (the United States)
- Coordinates: 36°48′37″N 119°22′55″W
- Country: United States
- State: California
- County: Fresno
- Named for: Spanish for "stone"
- Elevation: 538 ft (164 m)
- ZIP code: 93649

Piedra (Spanish for "Stone") is an unincorporated community in Fresno County, California, United States. It is located on the south bank of the Kings River, 23 miles (37 km) east of Fresno, at an elevation of 538 feet (164 m).

== History ==
In 1911, the Atchison, Topeka and Santa Fe Railroad built a branch line to a nearby quarry and bestowed the name "Piedra", Spanish for "rock" or "stone".

In 1965 this line was abandoned and pulled up.

The town was variously known as "Del Piedra" and "Delpiedra" before the name was standardized to Piedra.

The Delpiedra post office operated from 1920 to 1943. The Piedra post office was established in 1949.

== Geography ==
Pine Flat Dam is located approximately 2.5 miles northeast of Piedra.

=== Climate ===
According to the Köppen Climate Classification system, Piedra has a warm-summer Mediterranean climate, abbreviated "Csa" on climate maps.
