= Pine Flat Lake =

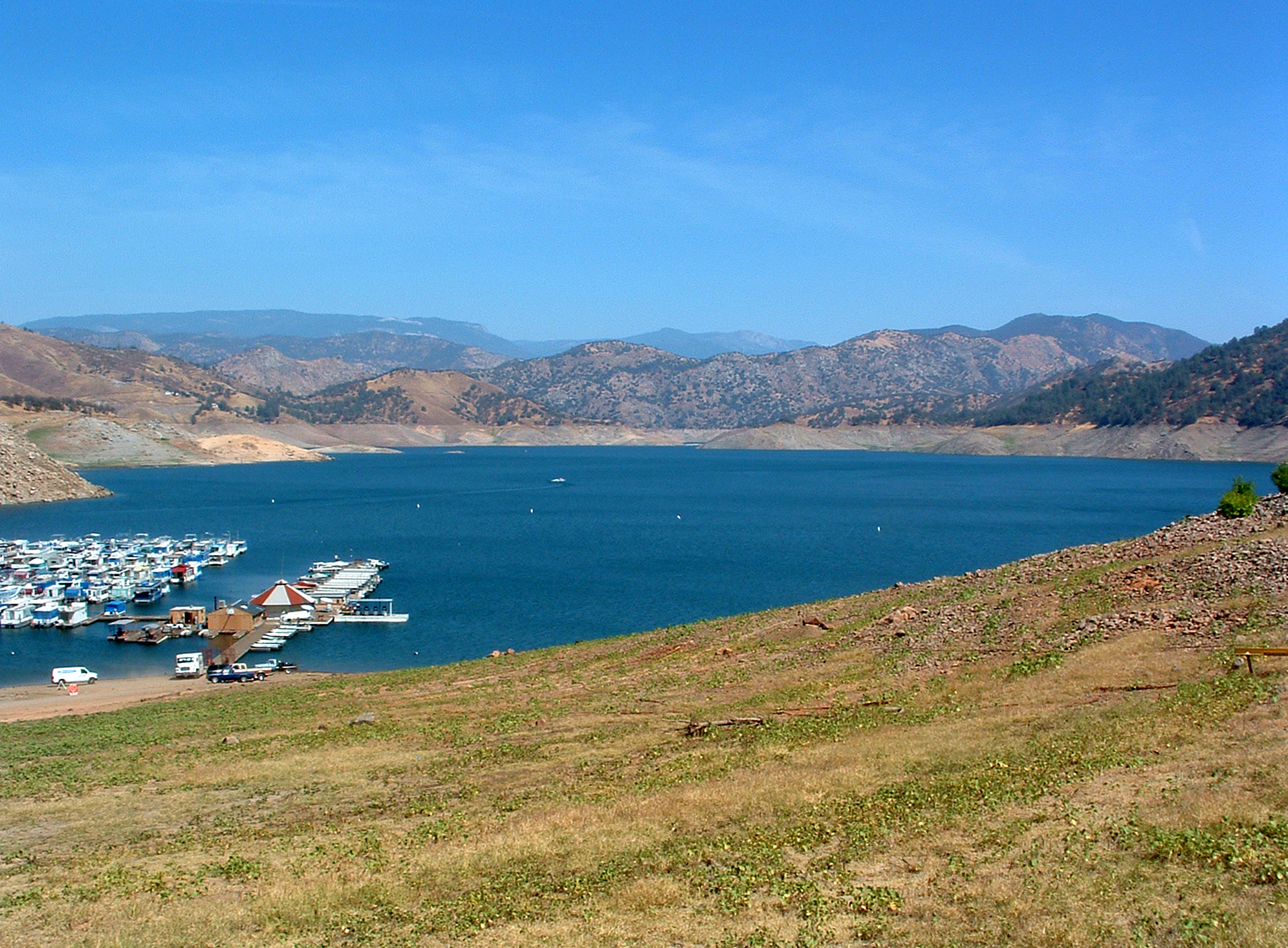
- Pine Flat Lake, located in the foothills of the Sierra Nevada Mountains.

- Location within California Location within the United States
- Location: Sierra National Forest; Sequoia National Forest; Fresno County, California, United States, near Piedra, California
- Coordinates: 36°49′57″N 119°19′33″W
- Type: Reservoir
- Primary inflows: Kings River
- Primary outflows: Kings River
- Catchment area: 1,545 sq mi (4,000 km^{2})
- Basin countries: United States
- Max. length: 29.6 km (18.4 mi)
- Surface area: 5,970 acres (24.2 km^{2})
- Max. depth: 429 feet (131 m)
- Water volume: 1,000,000 acre⋅ft (1.2 km^{3})
- Surface elevation: 261 m (856 ft)
- References: U.S. Geological Survey Geographic Names Information System: Pine Flat Lake

Pine Flat Lake is an artificial lake or reservoir in the Sierra Nevada foothills of eastern Fresno County, California on the western north–south border to the Sierra- and Sequoia National Forests, about 30 mi (48 km) east of Fresno. The lake is managed by the U.S. Army Corps of Engineers (USACE) and is open to boaters, campers & hikers.

The lake was formed by the construction of Pine Flat Dam on the Kings River in 1954 by the U.S. Army Corps of Engineers, and has a storage capacity of 1,000,000 acre⋅ft (1.2 km^{3}). Although it was primarily designed for flood control, the project also provides for irrigation and groundwater recharge, recreation, and with the completion in 1984 of the Jeff L. Taylor Pine Flat Power Plant, generation of 165 Megawatts hydroelectric power.

== Recreation and Wildlife ==
The lake is a popular regional tourist destination for water-based recreation. The U.S. Army Corps of Engineers, Sacramento District manages the land around the lake and offers several recreation areas and wildlife management areas. The following recreation and wildlife areas help lake visitors experience Pine Flat Lake:

- Deer Creek Recreation Area and Pine Flat Lake Marina (the marina is privately operated under an agreement with USACE).
- Island Park Recreation Area and Campground
- Lakeview Recreation Area
- Edison Point Wildlife Area (open to hunting and wildlife viewing)
- Trimmer Springs Recreation Area and Campground
- Sycamore Creek Wildlife Area (open to hunting and wildlife viewing)
- Kirch Flat Recreation Area and Campground (managed by Sierra National Forest)

The fisheries are managed and stocked by the California Department of Fish and Wildlife, common fish species include: large and smallmouth bass, spotted bass, rainbow trout, king (chinook) and kokanee salmon, catfish, crappie and bluegill. Anglers can fish for native rainbow trout in the upper Kings River, which is a special management area that encourages natural reproduction of wild trout without the planting of domestic stock. Anglers must have a valid state fishing license and comply with all California Department of Fish and Wildlife rules & regulations.

Hunting is permitted outside of developed recreation areas with bow and arrow or shotgun only.

Enforcement of rules and regulations are performed by USACE Park Rangers, Game Wardens with the California Department of Fish and Wildlife, and deputies of the Fresno County Sheriff's Department.

== See also ==
- U.S. Army Corps of Engineers
- Sierra National Forest
- Sequoia National Forest
- Kings Canyon National Park
- List of dams and reservoirs in California
- List of lakes in California
- List of largest reservoirs in the United States
- List of largest reservoirs of California
