= Yokuts =

Indigenous peoples of California, U.S.

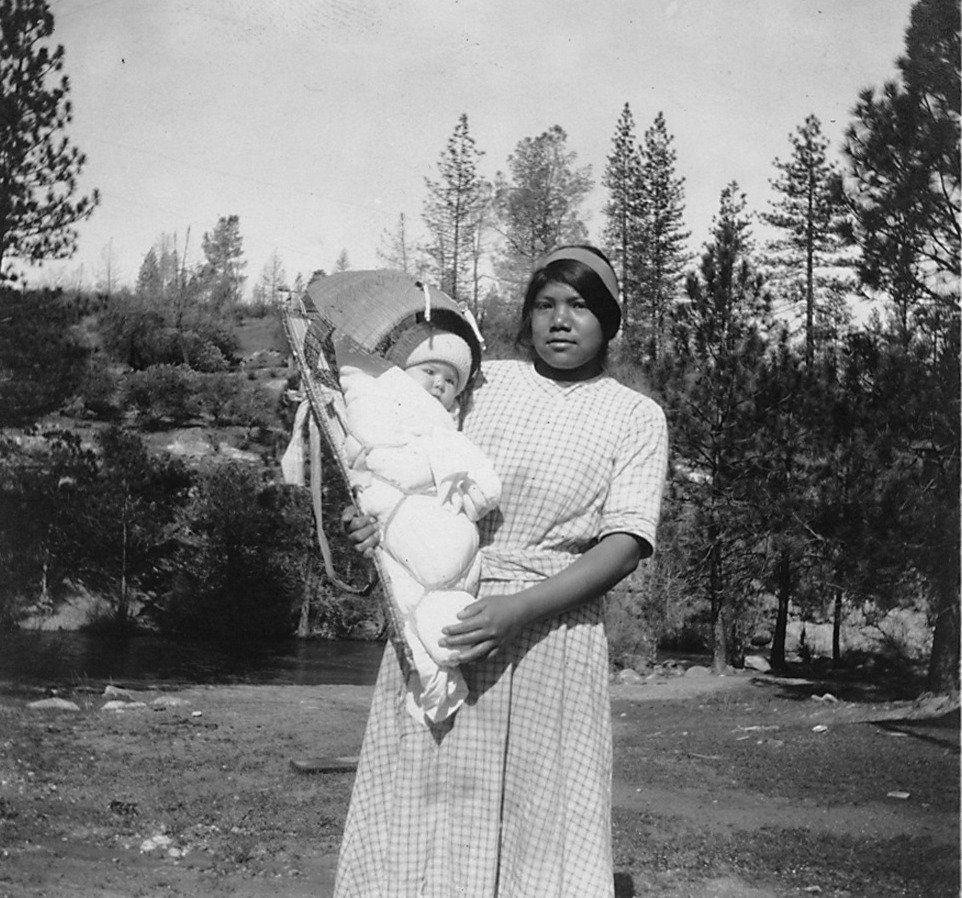
- A Chukchansi woman and child, California, ca. 1920

Total population
- 6,273 alone and in combination (2010)

Regions with significant populations
- United States ( California)

Languages
- English, Yokuts language

Religion
- Indigenous religion, Christianity, Kuksu religion, previously Ghost Dance

Related ethnic groups
- Maidu, Miwok, Ohlone, and Wintu peoples

The Yokuts are an Indigenous people of California who live in the Central Valley. They are often divided into Foothill Yokuts, Northern Valley Yokuts, and Southern Valley Yokuts.

Before European contact, the Yokuts consisted of up to 60 tribes speaking several related Yokuts languages, which may belong to the proposed Yok-Utian language family.

Today, many Yokuts are enrolled in the following federally recognized tribes:

- Picayune Rancheria of Chukchansi Indians of California
- Santa Rosa Indian Community of the Santa Rosa Rancheria (Tachi)
- Table Mountain Rancheria (Mono)
- Tejon Indian Tribe
- Tule River Indian Tribe of the Tule River Reservation
- Tuolumne Band of Me-Wuk Indians of the Tuolumne Rancheria of California

The contemporary Wukchumni and Choinumni communities are not federally recognized.

As of the 2010 census, a total of 6,273 people identify as Yokuts. Many of them live on reservations that have casinos. Gaming has been essential to providing Yokuts with jobs, funding, and healthcare.

== Name ==
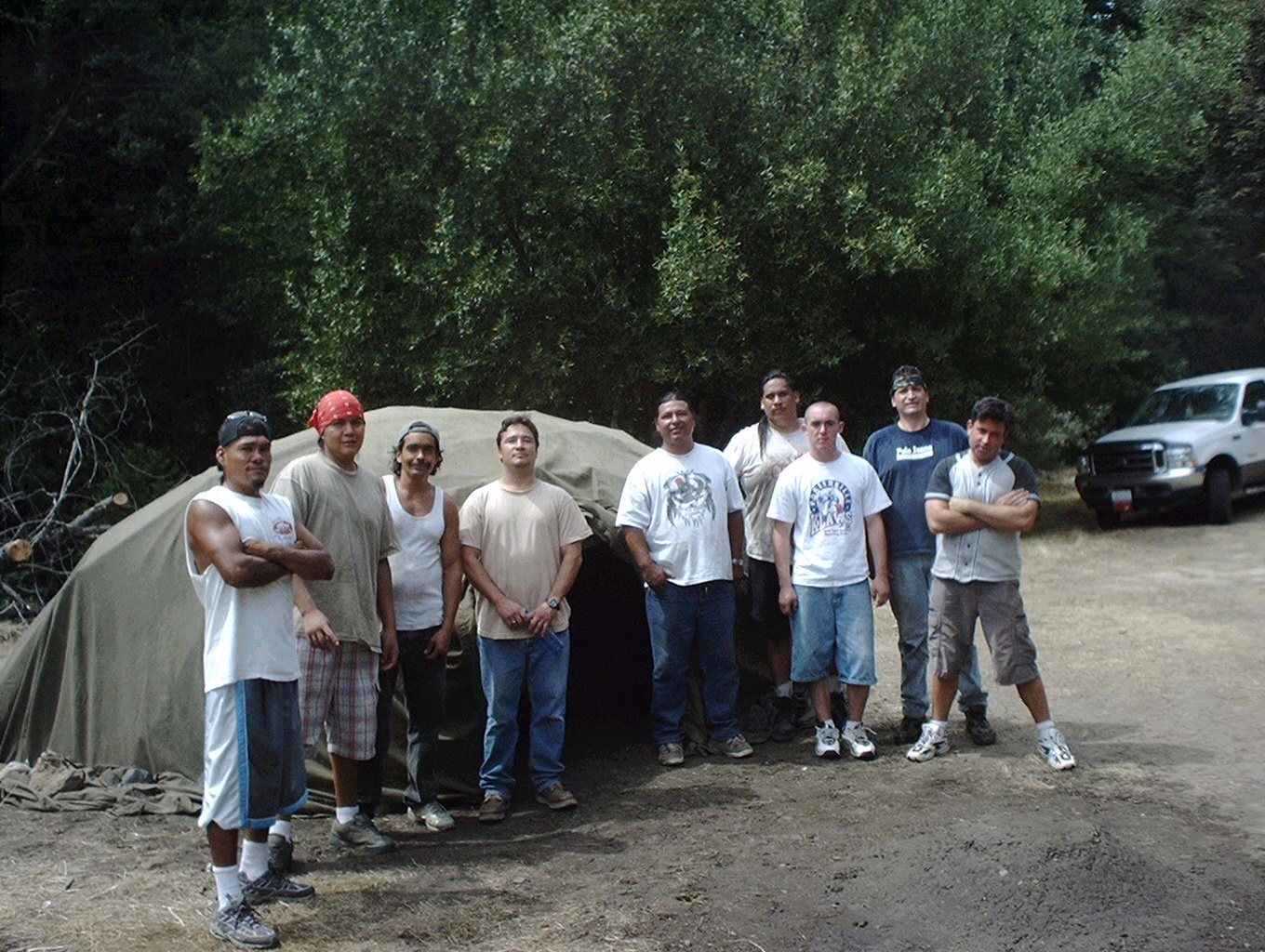
Yokuts and Miwok men outside of a sweat lodge, Tule River Reservation, 2007

Another name used to refer to the Yokuts was Mariposans. The endonym "Yokuts" itself means "people.")

Yokuts is both plural and singular; Yokut, while common, is erroneous. Yokut should only be used when referring specifically to the Tachi Yokut Tribe of Lemoore.

Some of Yokuts people refer to themselves by their respective tribal names; they reject the term Yokuts, saying that it is an exonym invented by English-speaking settlers and historians.

== History ==
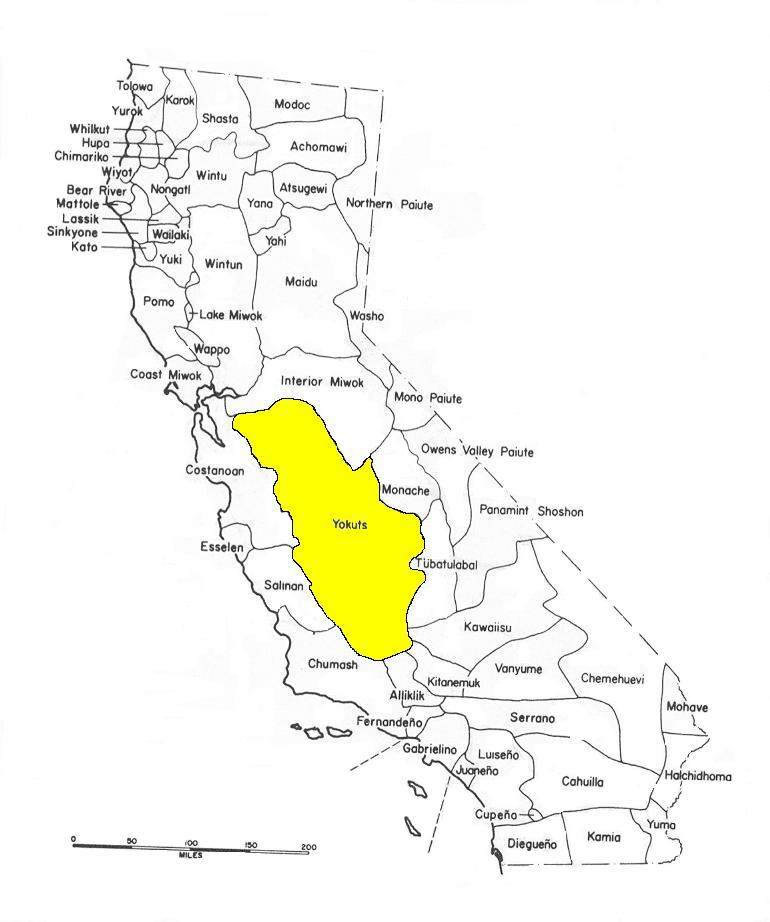
Map of historical Yokuts territory

Many stories are told, depending on the tribe, on how the Yokuts and their land came to be, but most follow a similar form.

Their creation story states that once the world was completely covered in water. Then came an eagle and a crow. As they were flying, they came upon a duck and asked the duck to bring up mud from the water so there might be land again. The duck did as he was asked, and this mud became the land of the Yokuts, more specifically the Sierra Nevada and the Coast Mountains. To this day, the crow and the eagle continue to be symbolic figures in Yokuts religious ceremonies.

=== Precontact ===
Yokuts life was rather peaceful. The more than 60 tribes had an estimated 400 to 600 or more people in each tribe at the time of contact with the Spaniards in 1770. In Yokuts culture, men and women had different responsibilities. Men usually did the hunting, fishing, and building, while the women gathered, maintained the home, and cared for the children. Divorce was not difficult to achieve and could be done for a number of reasons, including affairs, laziness, and infertility.

Artistic expression among the Yokuts included music, singing, and painting. Basketmaking was also a way for the Yokuts to show their artistic skills by weaving designs and images into the baskets. Other forms of expression were done on the bodies of the Yokuts, such as tattoos and piercings.

The Yokuts partook in two important religious ceremonies, the annual mourning rite and the first fruit rite. Shamans were important to the Yokuts as they were believed to have supernatural powers, helped conduct ceremonies, and were able to treat the sick. However, shamans were able to use their power for good or evil, and depending on how they used their power they could be executed.

=== During contact ===
The first time the Yokuts encountered Europeans was in 1772, when Spanish troops were in the area searching for soldiers. In the 19th century, missions were introduced by the Spaniards and as they expanded they forced the Yokuts to work the land for farming. The harsh working conditions along with disease and abuse led to the death of many Yokuts. With their work force dwindling the missions moved further inland forcing those they encountered to convert and work.

In 1833, malaria was brought by British fur traders, spreading through the native population through their use of the sweat houses. This decrease in population left the Yokuts weak in numbers when gold was discovered, bringing with it more foreigners.

Gold was discovered in California in 19th century. The 1850s were a devastating time for California's Native Americans due to the incursion of European settlers into their homelands, who enslaved or killed the natives in great number. The gold rush left the Yokuts with no land and a large decrease in their population. In 1853, malaria spread once again among the Yokuts, killing more natives. By 1854, what was left of the Yokuts tribes was forced to move to the Fort Tejon Reservation. The reservation briefly flourished, until a combination of mismanagement, droughts, and flooding caused its eventual failure and abandonment in 1864. Tule Reservation was established in 1873 and many Yokuts moved there. Disease, violence, and relocation severely diminished the Yokuts; today, they number only a fraction of their precontact population.

== Population ==
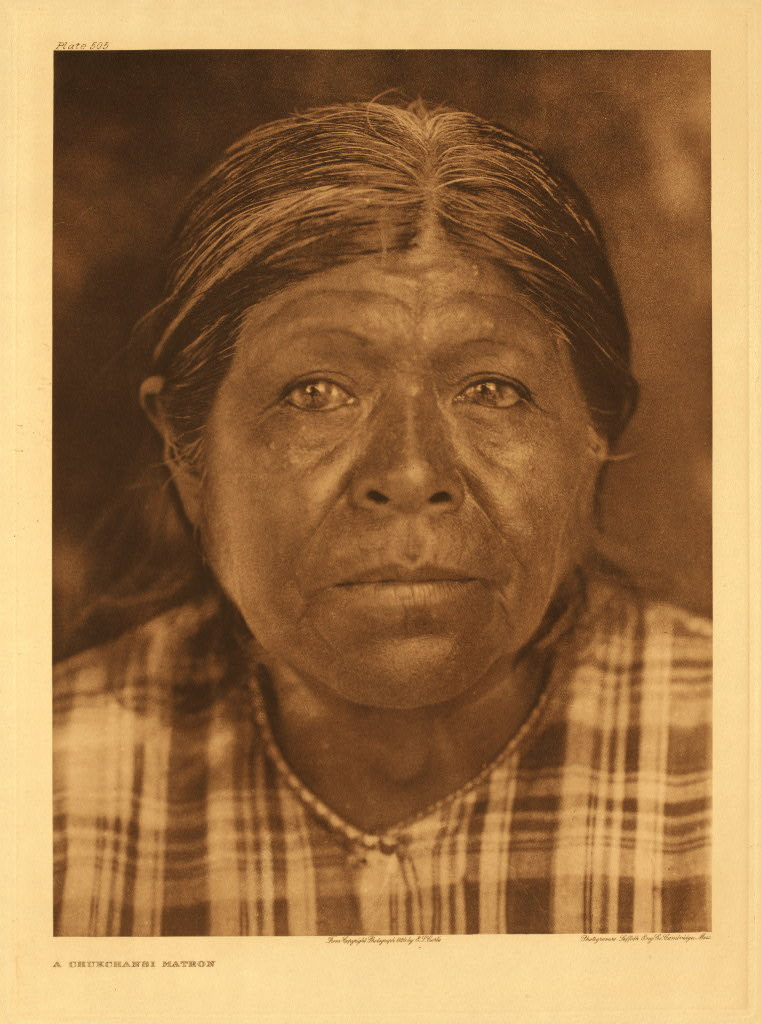
Chukchansi Yokuts woman, photo by Edward Curtis, 1924

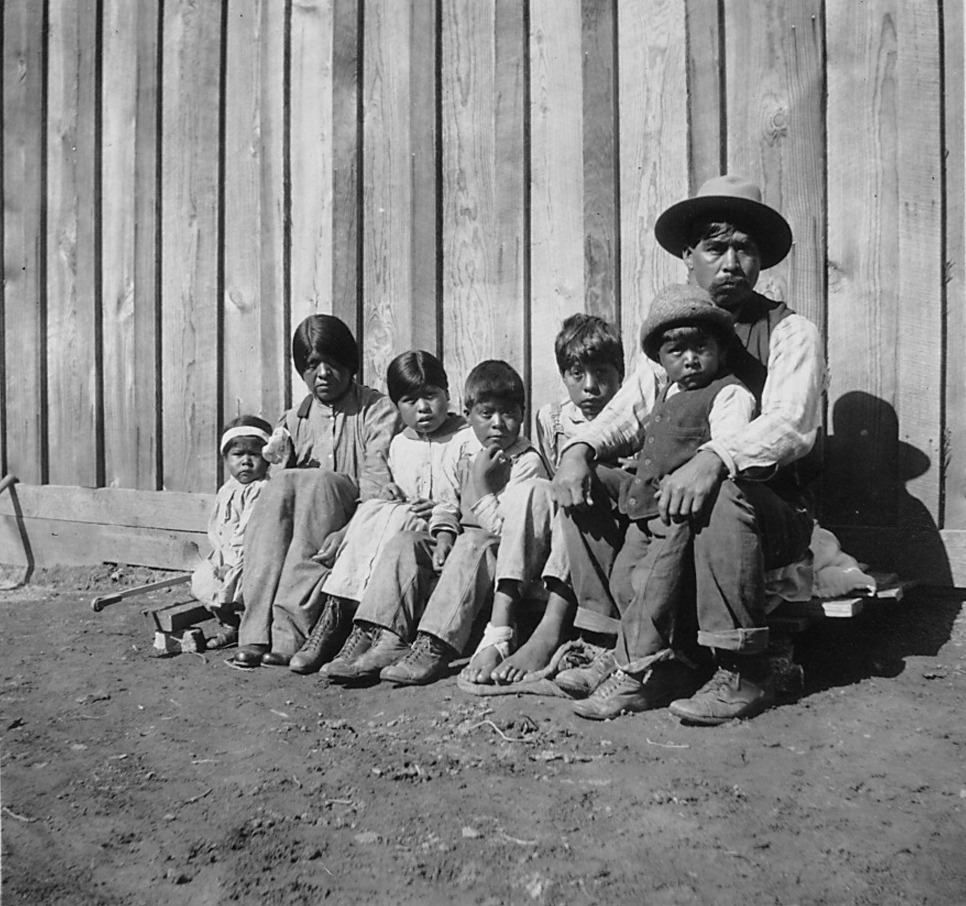
A Chukchansi family near Oakhurst, California, c. 1920

Estimates for the precontact populations of most native groups in California have varied substantially (See Population of Native California). Alfred L. Kroeber in 1925 put the 1770 population of the Yokuts at 18,000.

Several subsequent investigations suggested that the total should be substantially higher. Robert F. Heizer and Albert B. Elsasser 1980 suggested that the Yokuts had numbered about 70,000. They had one of the highest regional population densities in precontact North America.

The federal government, which had recently acquired California after defeating Mexico in the Mexican–American War, signed a treaty (one of 18 such treaties signed state-wide, setting aside seven and a half percent of California's land area) defining a proposed reservation and 200 head of cattle per year.

The US Senate failed to ratify any of the 18 treaties in a secret vote cast on July 8, 1852, with every member either abstaining or voting no. The result of the vote was not made public until 1905. The newly organized state government took a different approach. In 1851, California Governor Peter Burnett said that unless the Indians were moved east of the Sierras, "a war of extermination would continue to be waged until the Indian race should become extinct".

Over the course of the next 50 years, settlers and eventually the California State Militia would wage war on the Yokuts and other native tribes in what became known as the California genocide. The Yokuts were reduced by around 93% between 1850 and 1900, with many of the survivors being forced into indentured servitude sanctioned by the so-called "California State Act for the Government and Protection of Indians". A few Valley Yokuts remain, the most prominent tribe among them being the Tachi Yokut. Kroeber estimated the population of the Yokuts in 1910 as 600.

Historically, tribe has a head chief (winatun) and a village chief.

Today, about 2,000 Yokuts are enrolled in federally recognized tribes. An estimated 600 Yokuts are said to belong to unrecognized tribes.

== Territory ==
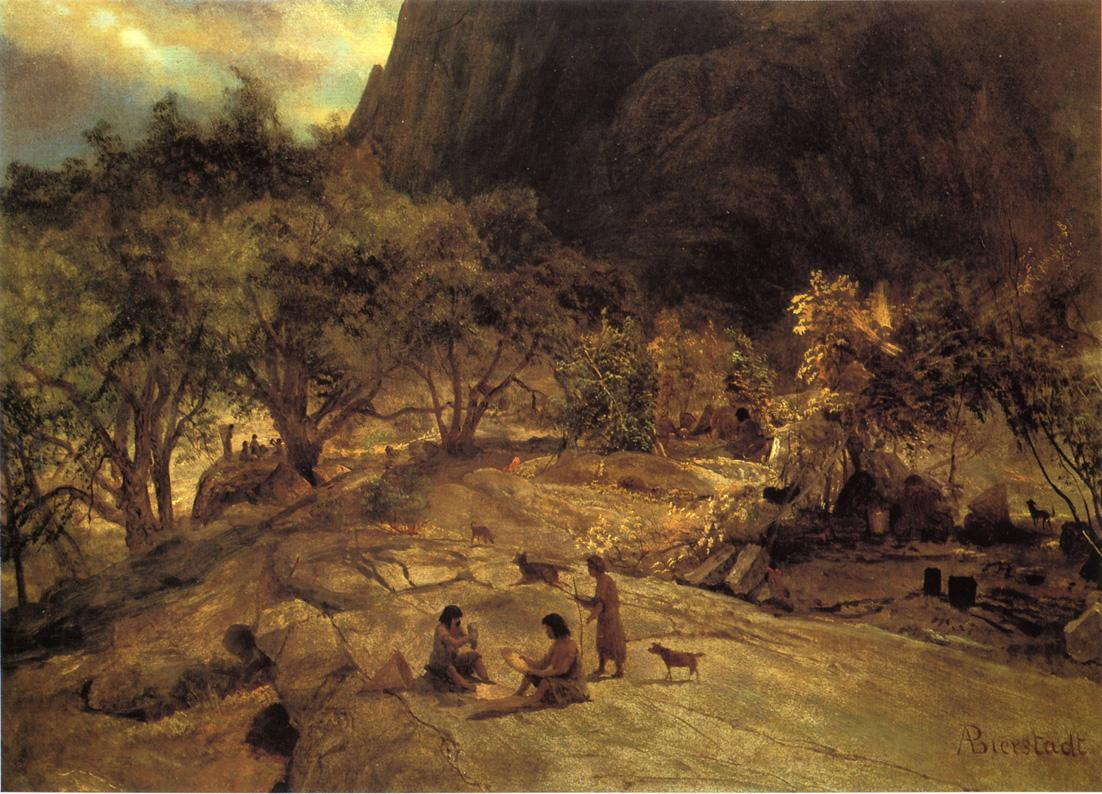
Mariposa Indian Encampment Yosemite Valley California, by Albert Bierstadt

Yokuts tribes lived in the San Joaquin Valley, from the Sacramento-San Joaquin River Delta ("the delta") south to Bakersfield and the adjacent foothills of the Sierra Nevada mountain range, which lies to the east. Tulare Lake was a population center for the Yokuts tribes until they were driven off by white settlers."..In 1858 or 1859, settlers began ethnically cleansing Tulare Lake, by killing or forcibly relocating the majority of the Yokuts population. Severe floods in 1861 and 1867 killed thousands of cattle and caused settlers to request further dams on the inflows to Tulare Lake. From 1875 to 1877, large numbers of hogs and cattle were carried to Skull Island from the mainland on the Mose Andross. Presumably the last autonomous Indigenous people lived at the Tulare Lake archipelago in the 1870s. Yoimut detailed white settlers introducing cattle to the island and subsequently forcing the indigenous people out:

While we were at Chawlowin some white men put cattle on the island. The water was low and they drove them across from the east. There were hogs there already, but they were wild. As soon as the white people found out we were there, we began to have trouble. The tules were getting dry and we were afraid the white people would burn us out. So, we all left. My mother and stepfather took us to Téjon Ranch. We went in his brother's little wagon.

In the northern half of the Yokuts region, some tribes inhabited the foothills of the Coast Range to the west. Some evidence shows Yokuts inhabiting the Carrizo Plain and creating rock art in the Painted Rock area.

== Language ==
San Diego State University states that the Yokutsan languages belong to the Penutian language family. The Yok-Utian language family has also been proposed.

== Foodways ==
Acorn mash was the Yokuts staple food, and they also made flour from tule roots and wild iris bulbs. They dined on game birds, waterfowl, rabbits, turtles, fish, mussels. They caught fish and game with spears, basket traps, and other tools. Big game was hunted less frequently, but included deer, elk, and pronghorn. They harvested wasp grubs, which were a seasonal delicacy and source of protein.

Yokuts harvested salt from salt grass and foraged manzanita berries, pine nuts, and other seeds. While they did garden, it was for tobacco not food.

== Communities ==
=== Historical Yokuts bands ===
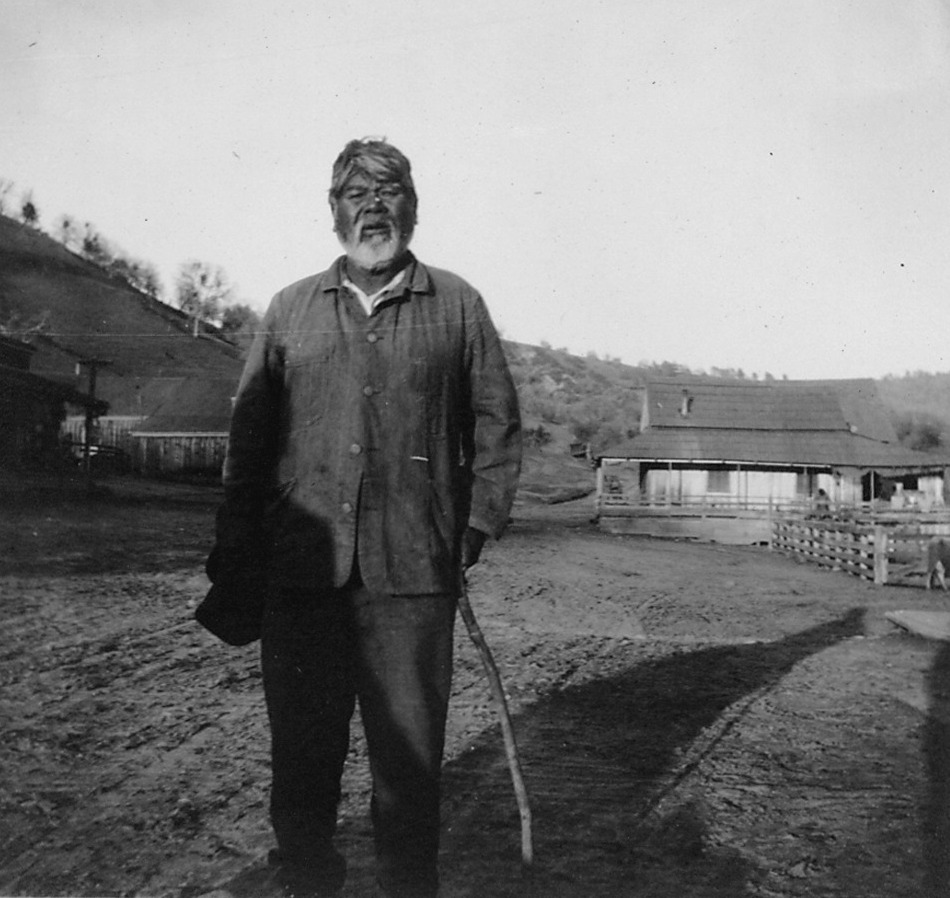
Dick Neal, a Chukchansi man, California, ca. 1920

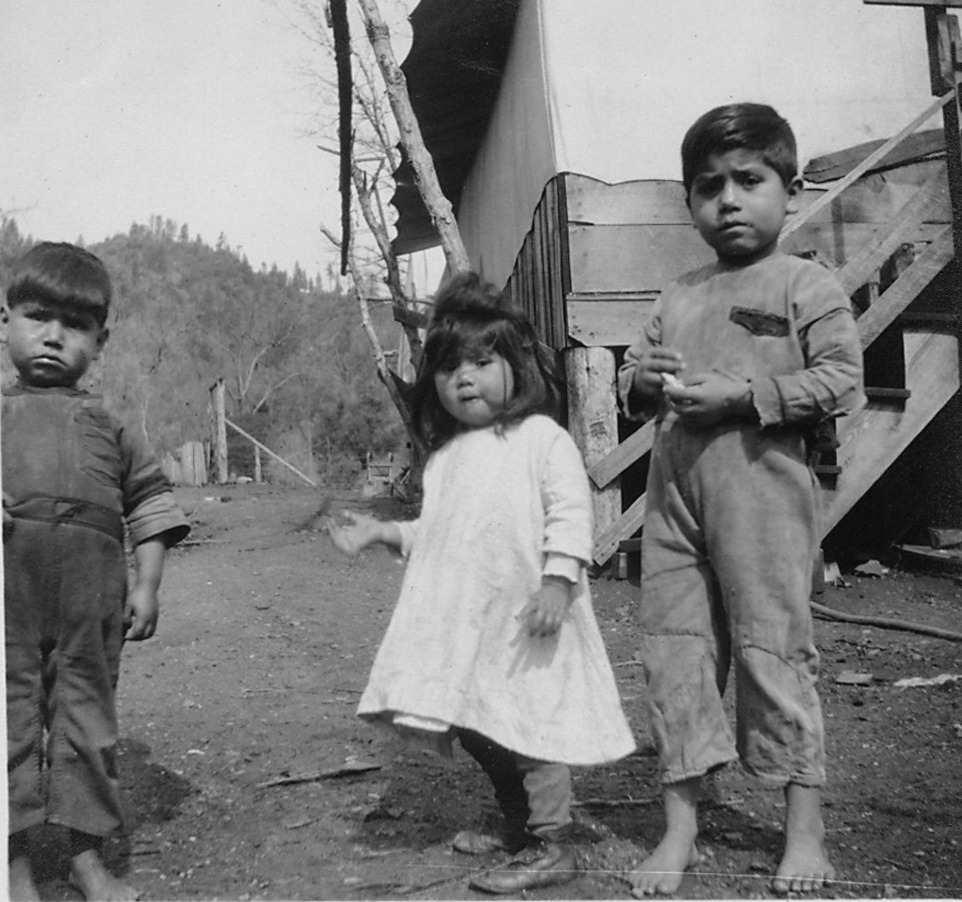
Chukchansi youths, California, ca. 1920

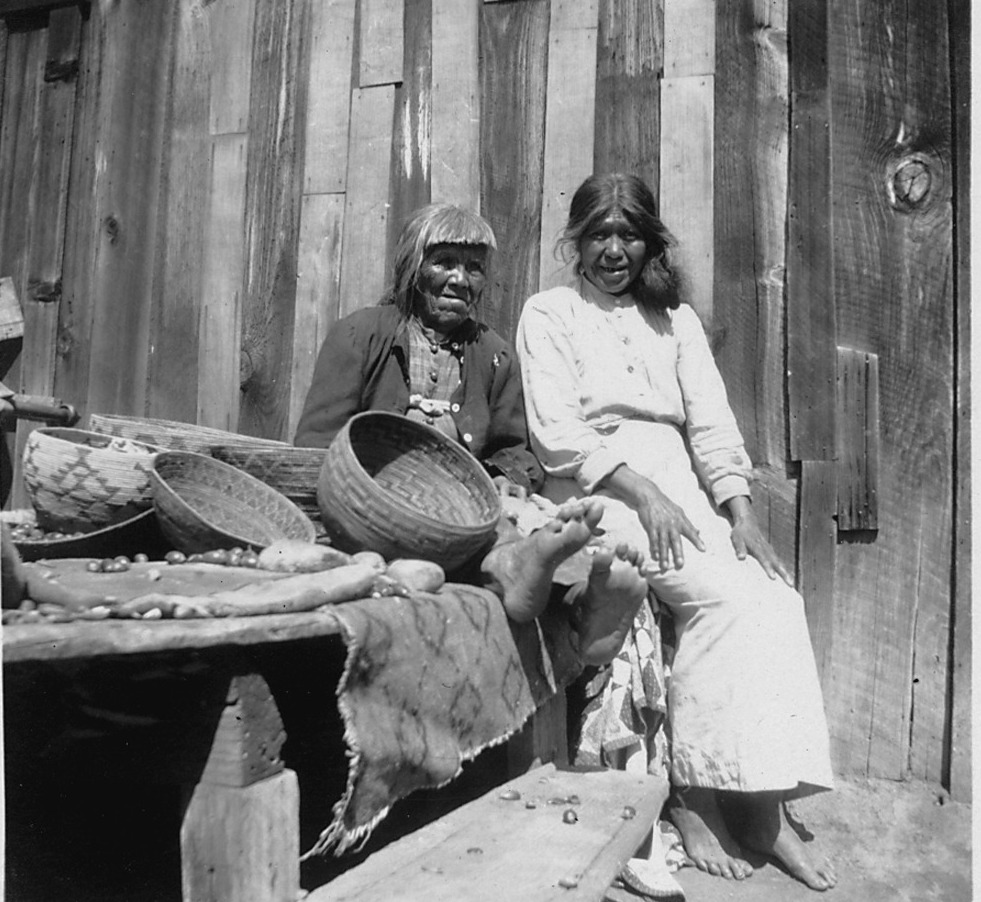
A Chukchansi woman preparing acorns for grinding, California, ca. 1920

Yokuts people historically lived in numerous regional bands.

==== Delta Yokuts ====
- Tarkumne - South bank of Carquinez Strait, from Rodeo to Martinez.
- Bolbumne - Antioch and Brentwood areas.
- Yachicumne - Stockton area and along the lower Calaveras River.
- Laquisumne - From the junction of the Mokelumne and Cosumnes Rivers south to Stockton.
- Apelumne - South and east of Stockton, including Escalon, Manteca, French Camp, and Lathrop.
- Yalesumne - From the Tuolumne River to north of the Stanislaus River, possibly as far north as the Cosumnes River.
- Hunezumne - Stockton area.
- Chelumne - Exact location in the delta is unknown.
- Chucumne - Between the San Joaquin River and Stockton.
- Cosumne - On the Cosumnes River from its junction with the Mokelumne to a point upstream ten miles above Sloughhouse.
- Mokelumne - On the Mokelumne River from its junction with the Cosumnes to the foothills.

==== Northern Valley Yokuts ====
- Hulpumne - Byron to Tassajara.
- Cholbumne - Byron to just south of Tracy, including Livermore Valley, Altamont, Patterson, and Corral Hollow passes.
- Hoyumne - West of San Joaquin River and south of Tracy. Exact location unknown.
- Miumne - Orestimba Creek Basin extending south to the Garzas Creek Basin and east to the San Joaquin River.
- Kahwatchwah - San Joaquin River around the Mendota, Firebaugh, and Los Banos areas.
- Honoumne - West of the San Joaquin River between the Kahwatchwah and the Miumne.
- Tucuyu - South of the Kahwatchwah on Fresno and Fish Sloughs.
- Walakumne - Between the Stanislaus and Tuolumne Rivers.
- Suenumne - Lower Stanislaus River.
- Tuolumne - Lower Stanislaus River.
- Ausumne - Lower Merced River.
- Chulumne - Sand plains southwest of Stockton and opposite the Yachicumne.
- Chauchela (Chowchilla) - Chowchilla River from the San Joaquin River to the Sierra Nevada foothills.
- Heuche - Fresno River, from its junction with the San Joaquin River to the foothills.
- Hoyumne - San Joaquin River from Herndon to Cottonwood Creek (Friant Dam). Shares name with Yokuts tribe south of Tracy.
- Pitkache (Pitkachi) - San Joaquin River from Mendota Pool to Herndon.

==== Southern Valley Yokuts ====
- Tache (Tachi) - North and west shores of Tulare Lake, including Kettleman Hills and Kettleman Plains.
- Apiche - North of Murphy Slough (lower Kings River drainage).
- Wimilche - Along the north bank of the Kings River near Laton downstream to Fresno Slough.
- Nutúnutu - Along the south bank of the Kings River near Laton downstream to Fresno Slough.
- Itecha (Aitecha) - South bank of Kings River near Sanger. Across river and upstream from the Wéchikit, downstream from the Choinumne.
- Wéchikit - North bank of Kings River east of Sanger downstream to the Reedley area, including parts of Wahtoke Creek.
- Chunut - Northeastern shore of Tulare Lake and along the lower channels of the southern branches of the Kaweah River.
- Talumne - Along Cross, Mill, and Packwood Creeks (lower Kaweah River delta), centered around Visalia.
- Gáwea - North bank of the Kaweah River from Terminus Dam to Venice Hills.
- Yokodo - South bank of the Kaweah River from Exeter to the foothills.
- Wólase - Area around Cameron Creek (lower Kaweah River delta) east of Visalia.
- Choinok - Junction of Outside and Deep Creeks (lower Kaweah River delta) south to Tulare.
- Wowol - Southeastern shore of Tulare Lake, including Atwell Island (Alpaugh).
- Koyete - Tule River from Highway 99 to Porterville.
- Yowlumne - Lower Kern River/Bakersfield area, Caliente Creek, between Kern Lake and the Tehachapi Mountains and as far south as El Paso Creek.
- Tuhoumne - Lower Kern River downstream from the Yowlumne. Also on Buena Vista Lake, Buena Vista Slough, and Goose Lake south of the Paleumne.
- Halaumne (Hometwole) - Northern and western shores of Kern Lake.
- Tulumne - The south, west, and north sides of Buena Vista Lake and as far west as the Taft and McKittrick areas.

==== Foothill Yokuts ====
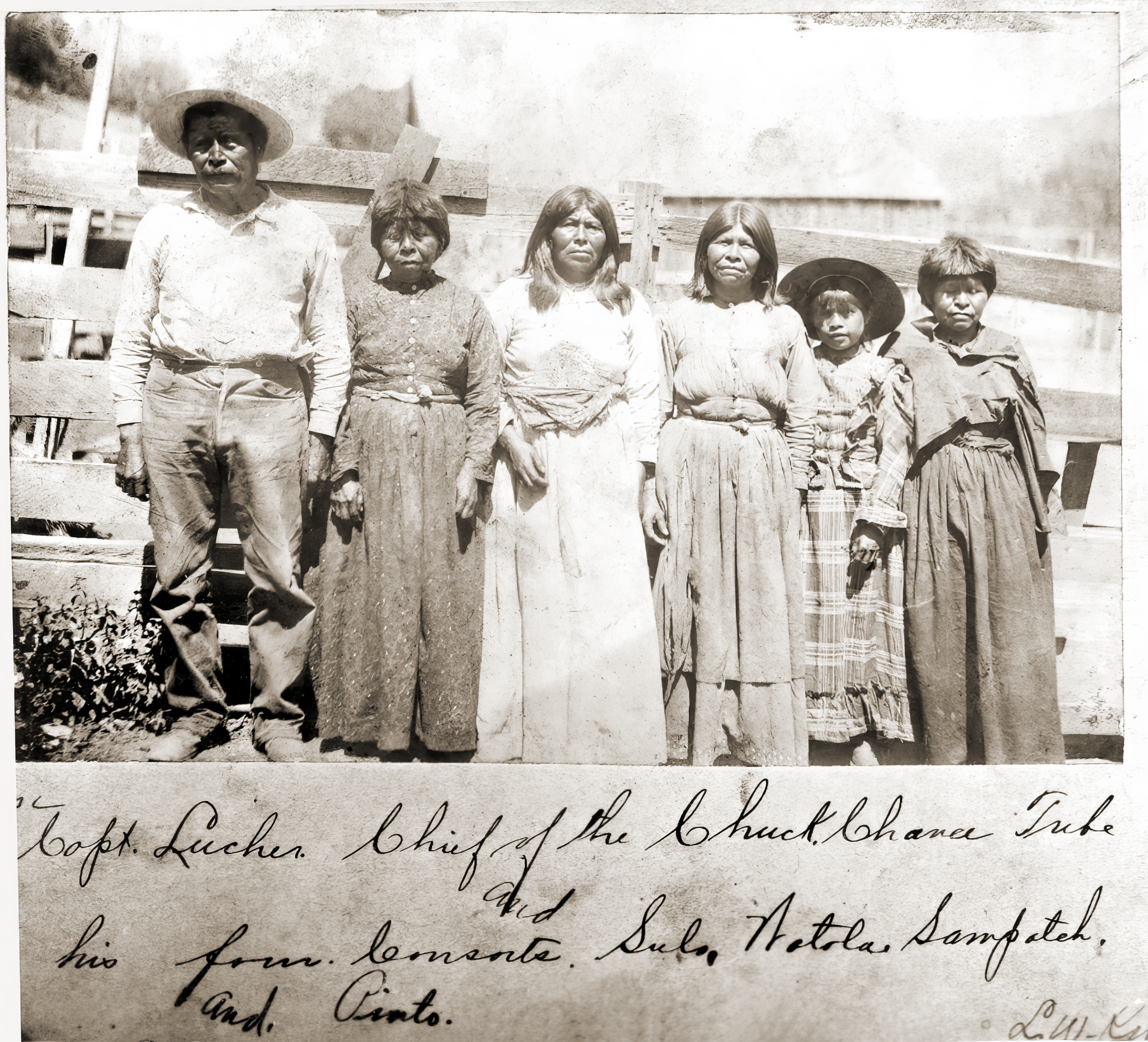
Chukchansi (then spelled "Chuck Chance") in Coarsegold, California. ca.1900

- Gashou - Foothills between the San Joaquin and Kings Rivers, including parts of the plains (Fresno/Clovis area). Centered around Dry Creek (Big Dry Creek).
- Chukchanse (Chuckchansi) (Mono language name: wowa) - Fresno River in the foothills above the Heuche, including Coarsegold, O'Neals, and Picayune Rancheria areas.
- Dalinche - Coarsegold and O'Neals area, including Fine Gold Creek .
- Kechaye - South side of the San Joaquin River upstream from the Dumna.
- Tolteche - On both sides of the San Joaquin River upstream from the Kechaye. Kerckhoff Dam area. The Monache (Western Mono) peoples bordered them to the east.
- Dumna - San Joaquin River from Millerton downstream to the mouth of Little Dry Creek.
- Éntimbits - Dunlap area, Wonder Valley
- Chukimena - Yokuts Valley
- Choinumne - Kings River around its junction with Mill Creek upstream to Sycamore Creek.
- Michahi - South of Choinumne on Mill Creek (tributary of Kings River).
- Páhdwishe (Balwishe) - On the Kaweah River centered around Camp Potwishe extending east to Sequoia National Park. Includes Three Rivers area.
- Wuksache - North of the Páhdwishe around Badger and upper Rattlesnake Creek. Includes Eshom Valley, Auckland, and Stokes Mountain area.
- Wukchumne - Kaweah River between Farmersville area to Terminus Dam, including Lemon Cove and Woodlake areas and lower Dry Creek (previously called Lime Kiln Creek).
- Bancalache - Deer Creek, Kernville, Lake Isabella.
- Yáudanche - North Fork Tule River.
- Hoeynche (Buknínuwad) - Upper Deer Creek, South Fork Tule River.
- Kumachese - White River area, Woody and Glennville areas.
- Paleumne - Poso Creek south to Kern River, territory extended to Kern River Falls at the mouth of Kern Canyon.

== Trade ==
Historically, Yokuts traded with other Indigenous California tribes, including coastal peoples such as the Chumash. They exported plant and animal products, salt, steatite, and obsidian. They used marine shells as a form of money showing they had a functional monetary system in place.

== Notable Yokuts ==
- Cucunuchi, also known as Estanislao (c. 1798–1838), was an Indigenous leader of the Lakisamni Yokuts and of Mission San José, who led a Native American revolt against the Mexican government and mission establishments

== See also ==
- Yokuts traditional narratives
- Thomas Jefferson Mayfield
