= San Joaquin Valley =

Area of the Central Valley in California

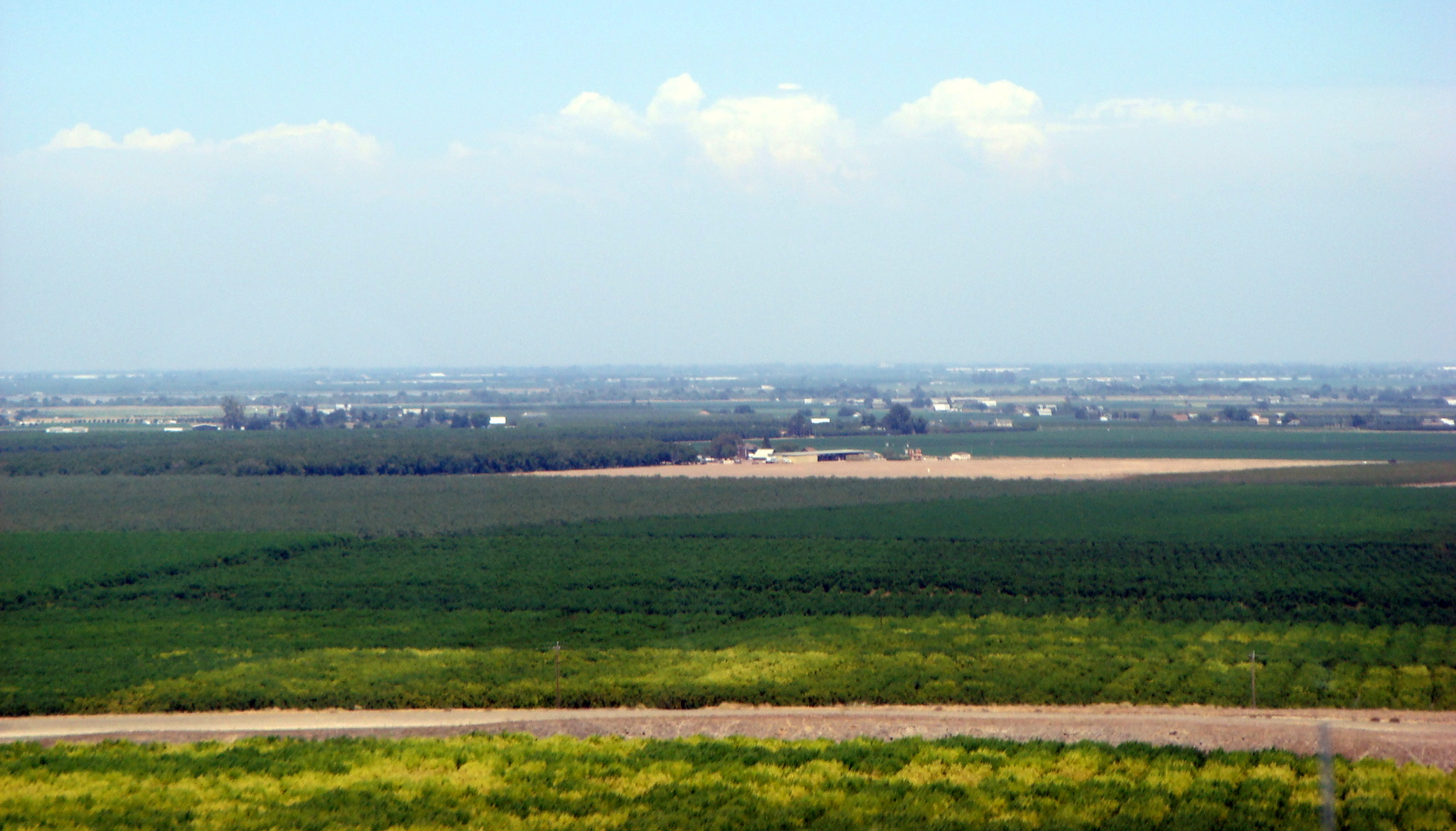
- San Joaquin Valley

- A map of the counties encompassing the San Joaquin Valley ecoregion

Geography
- Location: California, United States
- Population centers: Stockton, Mountain House, Tulare, Porterville, Modesto, Turlock, Merced, Fresno, Visalia, Bakersfield, Clovis, Hanford, Madera, Tracy, Lodi, Galt, Manteca and Ceres.
- Borders on: Sierra Nevada (east), Sacramento–San Joaquin River Delta (north), Coast Range, San Francisco Bay (west), Tehachapi Mountains (south)
- Coordinates: 36°37′44″N 120°11′06″W
- Traversed by: Interstate 5, State Route 99
- Rivers: San Joaquin River

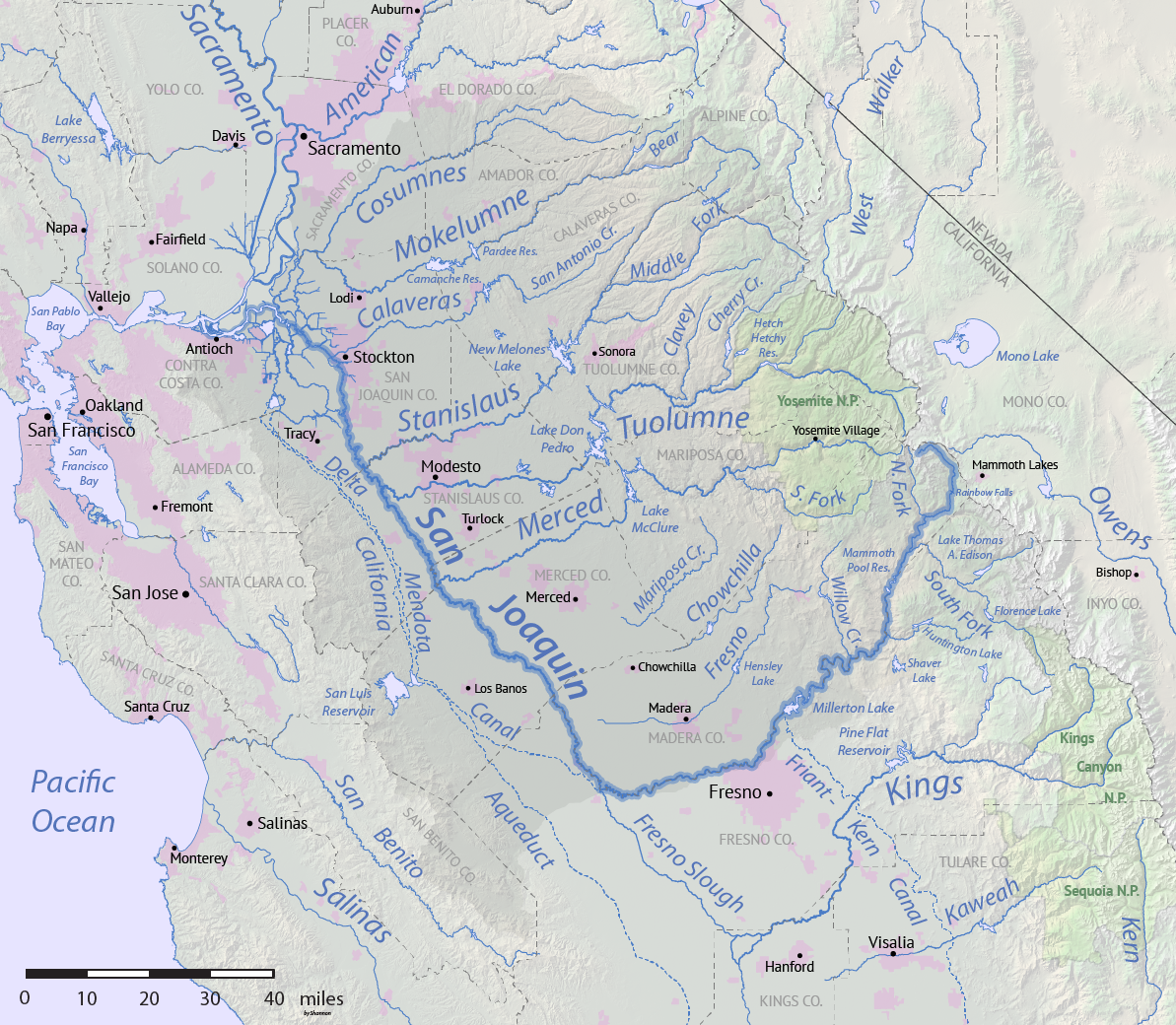
The San Joaquin River and its tributaries, showing the extent of the valley

The San Joaquin Valley (/ˌsæn hwɑːˈkiːn/ SAN whah-KEEN; Spanish: Valle de San Joaquín) is the southern half of California's Central Valley. Famed as a major breadbasket, the San Joaquin Valley is an important source of food, producing a significant part of California's agricultural output.

San Joaquin Valley draws from eight counties of Northern and Central California, including all of San Joaquin and Kings counties, most of Stanislaus, Merced, and Fresno counties, and parts of Madera and Tulare counties, along with a majority of Kern County. Although the valley is predominantly rural, it has four densely populated urban centers: Stockton/Modesto, Fresno, Porterville/Visalia, and Bakersfield.

== Geography ==
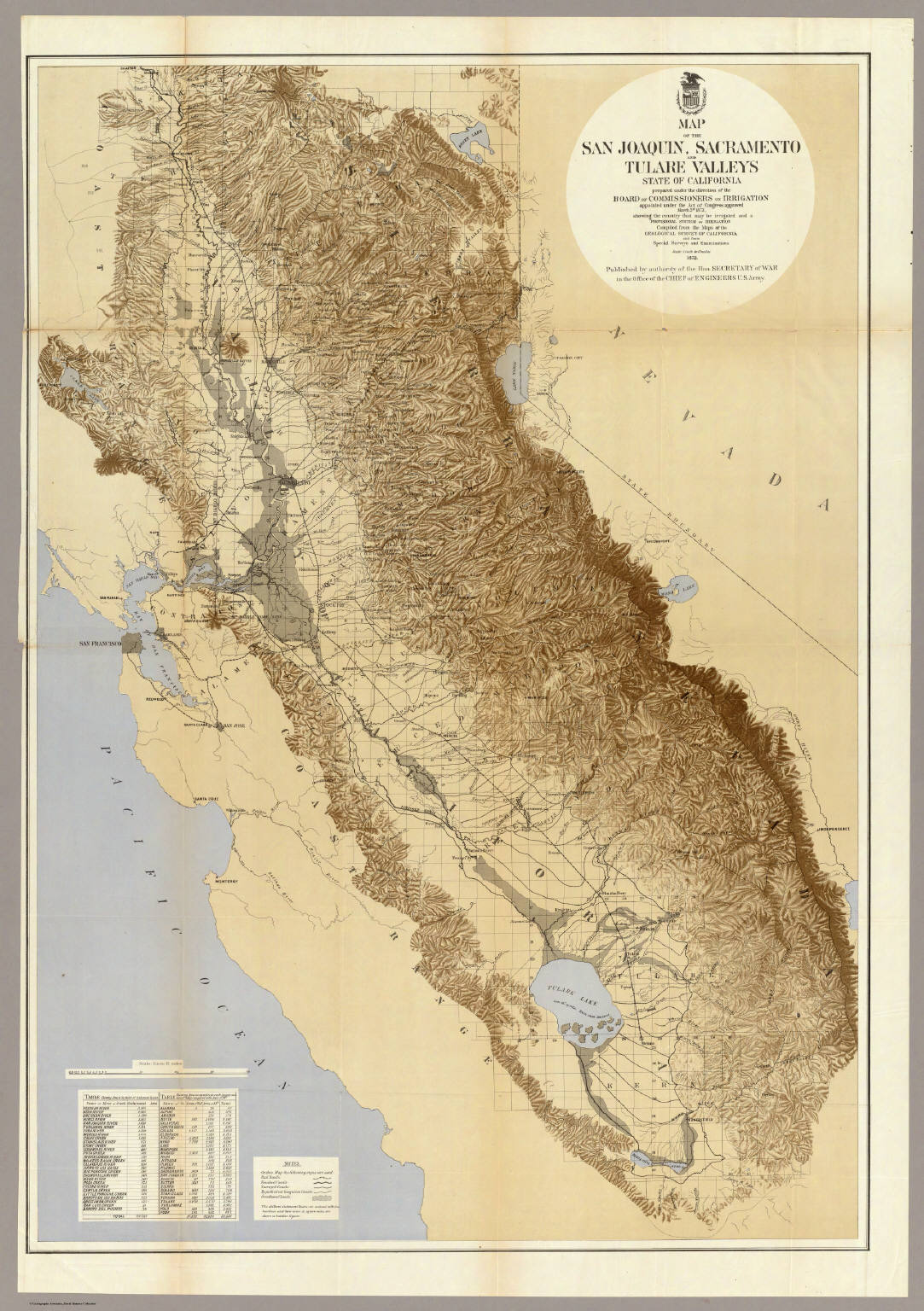
An 1873 map shows Tulare Lake prior to shrinkage from large-scale agriculture.

The San Joaquin Valley is the southern half of California's Central Valley. It extends from the Sacramento–San Joaquin River Delta in the north to the Tehachapi Mountains in the south, and from the California coastal ranges (Diablo and Temblor) in the west to the Sierra Nevada in the east.

The valley contains two large river systems, divided north and south. The northern portion of the San Joaquin Valley is called the San Joaquin Basin: the watershed of the San Joaquin River and its tributaries, including parts of the Kings River, all of which drain northwest into the Sacramento–San Joaquin River Delta and eventually out to the Pacific Ocean. The somewhat larger southern portion is the Tulare Basin, an endorheic basin centered on Tulare Lake. Historically, Tulare Lake was fed by the Tule River, the Kings River, the Kaweah River, the White River and the Kern River, but much of this water has been diverted for agricultural uses and the watershed is mostly dry in its lower reaches.

=== Geological history ===
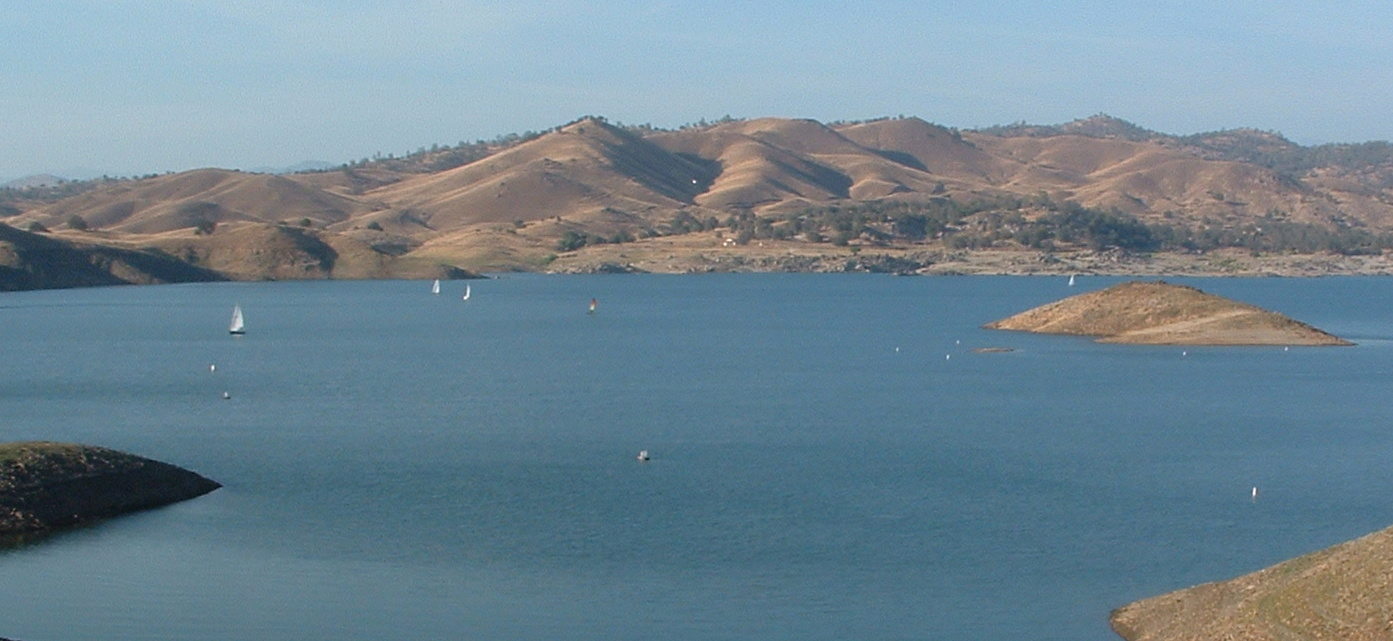
Millerton Lake, supplied by the Madera Canal and Friant-Kern Canal

The San Joaquin Valley began to form about 66 million years ago during the early Paleocene era. Broad fluctuations in the sea level caused various areas of the valley to be flooded with ocean water for the next 60 million years. About 5 million years ago, the marine outlets began to close due to uplift of the coastal ranges and the deposition of sediment in the valley. Starting 2 million years ago, a series of glacial episodes periodically caused much of the valley to become a fresh water lake. Lake Corcoran was the last widespread lake to fill the valley about 700,000 years ago. At the beginning of the Holocene there were three major lakes remaining in the southern part of the Valley, Tulare Lake, Buena Vista Lake and Kern Lake. In the late 19th and in the 20th century, agricultural diversion of the Kern River eventually dried out these lakes. Today, only a fragment of Buena Vista Lake remains as two small lakes Lake Webb and Lake Evans in a portion of the former Buena Vista Lakebed.

=== Climate ===
The San Joaquin Valley has extremely hot, dry summers and pleasantly mild winters characterized by dense tule fog. Its rainy season normally runs from November through April. The valley has experienced a severe and intensifying megadrought since the early 2010s. This drought is not only affecting humans, with farmland taking much of the impact, but also the wildlife as well.

In August 2015, the Director of the California Department of Water Resources stated, "Because of increased pumping, groundwater levels are reaching record lows—up to 100 feet lower than previous records." Research from NASA shows that parts of the San Joaquin Valley sank as much as 8 inches (0.20 m) in a four-month period, and land near Corcoran sank 13 inches (0.33 m) in 8 months. The sinking has destroyed thousands of groundwater well casings and has the potential to damage aqueducts, roads, bridges, and flood-control structures. In the long term, the subsidence caused by extracting groundwater could irreversibly reduce the underground aquifer's water storage capacity, although immediate and short-term needs are given higher priority and a sense of urgency than long-term sustainability.

The National Weather Service Forecast Office for the San Joaquin Valley is located in Hanford and includes a Doppler weather radar. Weather forecasts and climatological information for the San Joaquin Valley are available from its official website.

== Early human settlement ==
The San Joaquin Valley was originally inhabited by the Yokuts and Miwok peoples. The first European to enter the valley was Pedro Fages in 1772.

The Tejon Indian Tribe of California is a federally recognized tribe of Kitanemuk, Yokuts, and Chumash indigenous people of California. Their ancestral homeland is the southern San Joaquin Valley, the San Emigdio Mountains, and the Tehachapi Mountains. Today they live in Kern County, California, headquartered in Wasco and Bakersfield, California.

The Picayune Rancheria of Chukchansi Indians of California is a federally recognized tribe of indigenous people of California, Chukchansi or Foothills Yokuts, now located in Madera County in the San Joaquin Valley. The Santa Rosa Rancheria belongs to the federally recognized Tachi Yokuts tribe and is located 4.5 miles (7.24 km) southeast of Lemoore, California, in the San Joaquin Valley. Since 2010, statewide droughts in California have further strained both the San Joaquin Valley's and the Sacramento Valley's water security.

== Demographics ==
The total population of the eight counties comprising the San Joaquin Valley at the time of the 2011–2015 American Community Survey 5-year Estimates by United States Census Bureau reported a population of 4,080,509. The racial composition of San Joaquin Valley was 1,428,978 (35.0%) Non-Hispanic White, 2,048,280 (50.2%) Hispanic or Latino, 310,557 (7.6%) Asian, 193,694 (4.7%) Black or African American, 40,911 (1.0%) American Indian and Alaska Native, and 13,000 (0.32%) Native Hawaiian and other Pacific Islander.

The educational attainment of high school graduate or higher is 72.7%.

=== Poverty ===
According to the United States Census Bureau's American Community Survey, six San Joaquin Valley counties had the highest percentage of residents living below the federal poverty line in 2006 of any counties in California. The report also showed that the same six counties were among the 52 counties with the highest poverty rate in the United States. The median income for a household in the valley was $46,713. The poverty rate for individuals below the poverty level is 23.7%. In 2005 U.S. congressional researchers compared the economically distressed Valley to the traditionally impoverished Appalachia region, resulting in the appellation New Appalachia.

In 2011 Forbes, after taking the fluctuation of median home values, five of the top twenty "most miserable cities" were located in the San Joaquin Valley. Aside from the collapse of median home values, persistent crime, unemployment and poverty were common factors between Bakersfield, Fresno, Merced, Modesto and Stockton – every major city of the San Joaquin Valley.

==== Medical access ====
Insufficient access to medicine in the United States, in particular prenatal and preventive care, is typified by both rural and inner city communities. Early and adequate access to prenatal care is important to maternal and child health and is another comparative indicator of community health. According to the California Department of Health Services, 37% of births in Merced County occurred with no or late prenatal care and the San Joaquin Valley average was 19.5% of births with no or late prenatal care. By comparison, the California average was 13.6% of births and the national average was 10% of births

Likewise, the counties of the San Joaquin Valley have relatively high ratios of population to physicians, suggesting relatively low access, with the highest in Kings County at 1,027 patients per a physician, the San Joaquin Valley average at approximately 671 patients per a physician and the California average of 400 patients per a physician. Another measure of access is licensed acute care hospital beds per thousand population, where the Kings County average of 1.1 beds per a thousand and the San Joaquin Valley average of 1.8 beds per a thousand were again less than the state average of 2.1 bed per a thousand. Consequently, the age adjusted death rate is significantly higher than the rest of California.

In response the University of California with the University of California, Merced is exploring opening a research medical school specializing in rural care, in hopes that some graduates will settle in the San Joaquin Valley and provide better healthcare.

=== Ethnic and cultural groups ===
==== Latinos/Hispanics, Chicanos and Mexicans ====
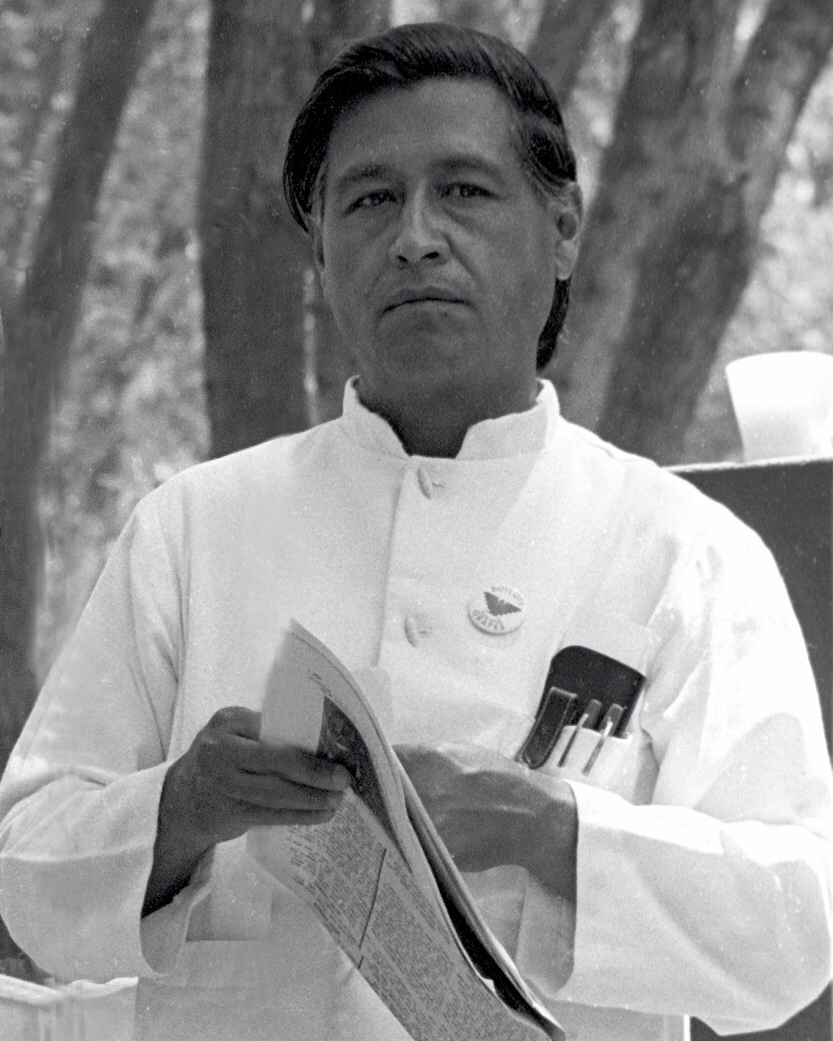
César Chávez at a United Farmworkers rally, 1974

Currently, the Latino and Mexican descendants are a large percentage of the demographics in the San Joaquin Valley. Since not long after the onset of the bracero program during World War II, all but a minor percentage of the farmworkers in the region have been of Mexican ancestry. Ethnic and economic friction between Mexican-Americans and the valley's predominantly white farming elite manifested itself most notably during the 1960s and 1970s, when the United Farm Workers, led by César Chávez, went on numerous strikes and called for boycotts of table grapes. The UFW generated enormous sympathy throughout the United States, even managing to terminate several agricultural mechanization projects at the United States Department of Agriculture. Consequently, from the 1970s onward, landlords and large corporations have hired undocumented immigrants. This has allowed them to increase their profits due to low overhead on wages.

==== European groups ====
The San Joaquin Valley has—by California standards—an unusually large number of European, Middle Eastern, and Asian ethnicities in the heritage of its citizens. These communities are often quite large and, relative to Americans immigration patterns, quite eclectic: for example, there are more Azorean Portuguese in the San Joaquin Valley than in the Azores (see Portuguese in California). Many groups are found in majorities in specific cities, and hardly anywhere else in the region. For example, Assyrians are concentrated in Turlock, Dutch in Ripon, and Croats in Delano. Kingsburg is famous for its distinctly Swedish air, having been founded by immigrants from that country. Ethnic groups found in a broader area are Portuguese, Germans, Armenians, Basques, and the "Okies" of primarily English and Scots-Irish descent who migrated to California from the Midwest and South. Molokan Russians settled in Fresno, Kerman, and Madera as well as other Russian settled in Fresno. Mennonite groups descended from Russian Germans settled in the areas of Reedley and Dinuba, as well as Lutheran and Catholic Volga Germans who settled in the broader Fresno area.

==== Asian Americans ====
The San Joaquin Valley has a diverse Asian American and Asian immigrant population including Filipinos, Hmong and other Southeast Asians, Chinese, and Indians including a large population of Punjabi Sikhs.

Punjabi Sikh Americans have immigrated to the San Joaquin Valley since the early twentieth century. The first permanent gurdwara, or Sikh house of worship, was founded in Stockton in 1915. Following abolition of immigration restrictions from Asia in the 1960s and 1970s, large numbers of Pakistanis and Indians from Punjab, Gujarat, and Southern India settled in San Joaquin communities including Modesto, Livingston, Fresno, Stockton, and Lodi.

In addition, the late 1970s and 1980s saw an influx of immigrants from Indochina following the War in Vietnam. These immigrants, the majority of whom are Hmong, Laotian, Cambodian, and Vietnamese, have largely settled in the communities of Fresno, Stockton, Modesto, and Merced. Hmong, Laotians, and Cambodians are the largest communities of Southeast Asians in the San Joaquin Valley, and the valley has some of the largest populations of these groups in the nation. Fresno has the second-largest Hmong population of any American metropolitan area after Minneapolis–Saint Paul, and Stockton has a large Cambodian American population. Fresno, Stockton, Modesto, and Merced have some of the largest populations of Laotian Americans in the United States.

The Filipino American population has a strong history in Stockton. Filipino organizations in Stockton are reflected in various commercial buildings identified as Filipino. Filipinos fought for the U.S. against Japan in WWII, in exchange for favorable immigration status. Stockton has been an adjunct to the San Francisco Bay Area, which was a major military production and transit area during WWII. Filipino emigration to Stockton followed.

==== African Americans ====
Colonel Allensworth State Historic Park marks the location of the only California town to be founded, financed and governed by African Americans. The small farming community was founded in 1908 by Lt. Colonel Allen Allensworth, Professor William Payne, William Peck, a minister, John W. Palmer, a miner, and Harry A. Mitchell, a real estate agent, dedicated to improving the economic and social status of African Americans. Uncontrollable circumstances, including a drop in the area's water table, resulted in the town's demise.

==== Okies and Arkies ====
The Depression-era migrants to the San Joaquin Valley from the South and Midwest are one of the more well-known groups in the Central Valley, in large part due to the popularity of John Steinbeck's novel The Grapes of Wrath and the Henry Fonda movie made from it. By 1910, agriculture in the southern Great Plains had become nearly unviable due to soil erosion and poor rainfall. Much of the rural population of states such as Kansas, Texas, Oklahoma, and Arkansas left at this time, selling their land and moving to Chicago, Kansas City, Detroit, Denver, Phoenix, Las Vegas and fast-growing Los Angeles. Those who remained experienced continuing deterioration of conditions, which reached their nadir during the drought that began in the late 1920s and created the infamous Dust Bowl. (Small cotton farmers, many of them Black, in states such as Mississippi and Alabama suffered similar problems from the first major infestation of the boll weevil.) When the onset of the Great Depression created a national banking crisis, family farmers—usually heavily in debt—often had their mortgages foreclosed by banks desperate to shore up their balance sheets. In response, many farmers loaded their families and portable possessions into their automobiles and drove west.

Many of the Okies and Arkies left the San Joaquin Valley during World War II, most of them going to Los Angeles, San Francisco and San Diego to work in war-related industries. Many of those who stayed ended up in Bakersfield and Oildale, as the southern San Joaquin Valley became an important area of oil production after major Southern California oil fields such as Signal Hill began to dry up. Country music legends Buck Owens (from Texas) and Merle Haggard came out of Bakersfield's honky-tonk scene and created a hard-driving sound that is still deeply associated with the city.

== Economy ==
=== Agriculture ===
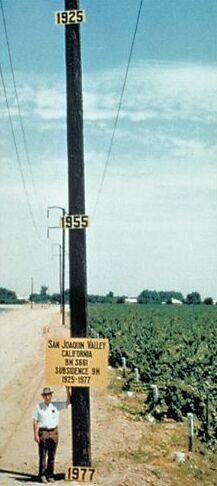
Signs on pole show approximate altitude of land surface in 1925, 1955, and 1977.

As of 2007, the San Joaquin Valley produces 12.8% of California's agricultural production (as measured by dollar value). Often called a breadbasket region, the valley farms emphasize fruits, vegetables and nuts more than grain for bread. Major crops include grapes (wine grapes, table grapes and raisins), cotton, almonds, pistachios, citrus, and vegetables. Walnuts, oranges, peaches, garlic, tangerines, tomatoes, kiwis, hay, alfalfa and numerous other crops have been harvested with great success. Certain places are identified quite strongly with a given crop: Stockton produces the majority of the domestic asparagus consumed in the United States, and Fresno County is the largest producer of raisins.

Cattle and sheep ranching are also vitally important to the valley's economy. During the late 19th century and early 20th century, the Miller & Lux corporation built an agricultural monopoly centered around cattle. The corporation can be characterized as a precursor to corporate farming transforming the yeoman farmer into wage workers. The success of the business can be attributed to founder Henry Miller's direct management style which is reflected in his detailed correspondences to his subordinates. During recent years, dairy farming has greatly expanded in importance. As areas such as Chino and Corona have become absorbed into the suburban sprawl of Los Angeles, many dairy farmers have cashed out and moved their herds to Kings, Tulare, and Kern counties.

Between 1990 and 2004, 70,231 acres (28,092 hectares) of agricultural land in the San Joaquin Valley was converted to urban development. As of 2022, more than 5 million acres of the valley are devoted to agriculture. By August 2014, a three-year drought was prompting changes to the agriculture industry in the valley. Farmers began using complex irrigation systems and using treated waste water to feed crops, while many were switching from farming cotton to other commodities, chief among them, almonds.

=== Petroleum ===
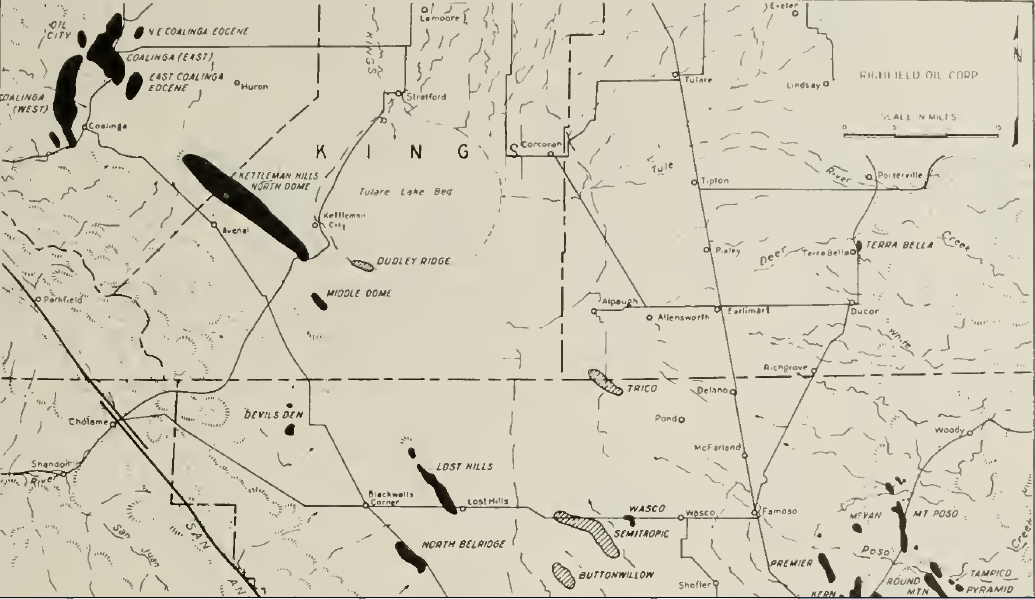
Map of Northern San Joaquin Valley Oil and Gas Fields

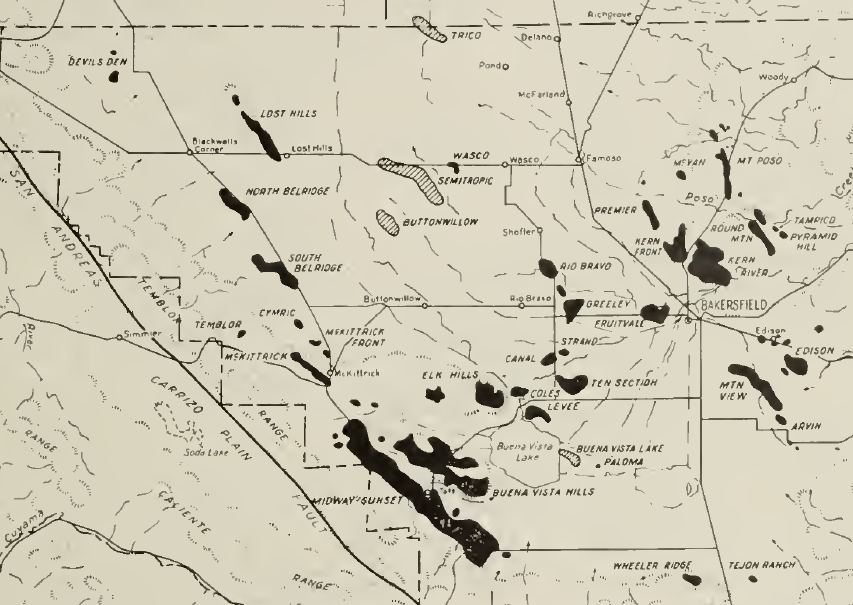
Map of Southern San Joaquin Valley Oil and Gas Fields

California is of the nation's highest oil-producing states, and the San Joaquin Valley has eclipsed the Los Angeles Basin as the state's primary oil production region. Scattered oil wells on small oil fields are found throughout the region, and several enormous extraction facilities – most notably near Lost Hills and Taft, including the Midway-Sunset Oil Field, the third-largest oil field in the United States – are veritable forests of pumps.

Shell operated a major refinery in Bakersfield; it was sold in 2005 to Flying J, a Salt Lake-based firm that operates truck stops and refineries. Flying J's bankruptcy in 2009 resulted in the refinery being shut down.

The oil and gas fields in Kern County are receiving increased attention since the July 2009 announcement by Occidental Petroleum of significant discovery of oil and gas reserves. Even prior to this discovery the region retains more oil reserves than any other part of California. Of California fields outside of the San Joaquin Valley, only the Wilmington Oil Field in Los Angeles County has untapped reserves greater than 100,000,000 barrels (16,000,000 m^{3}), while six fields in the San Joaquin Valley (Midway-Sunset, Kern River, South Belridge, Elk Hills, Cymric, and Lost Hills) each have reserves exceeding 100,000,000 barrels (16,000,000 m^{3}) of oil.

=== Other major industries and employers ===
The isolation and vastness of the San Joaquin Valley, as well as its poverty and need for jobs, have led the state to build numerous prisons in the area. The most notable of these is Corcoran, whose inmates have included Charles Manson and Juan Corona. Other correctional facilities in the valley are at Avenal, Chowchilla, Tracy, Delano, Coalinga, and Wasco.

The only significant military base in the region is Naval Air Station Lemoore, a vast air base located 25 kilometres (16 mi) WSW of Hanford. Unlike many of California's other military installations, NAS Lemoore's operational importance has increased in the 1990s and 2000s. The other, Castle Air Force Base, located near Atwater was closed during the Base Realignment and Closure of the 1990s. Although both are in Kern County, Edwards Air Force Base and China Lake Naval Air Weapons Station are located in the High Desert area of that county.

=== Recent changes ===
The California real estate boom that began in the late 1990s has significantly changed the San Joaquin Valley. Once distinctly and fiercely independent of Los Angeles and San Francisco, the area has seen increasing exurban development as the cost of living forces young families and small businesses further and further away from the coastal urban cores. Stockton, Modesto, Tracy (as well as the nearby city of Mountain House), Manteca, and Los Banos are increasingly dominated by commuters to San Francisco and Silicon Valley, and the small farming towns to the south are finding themselves in the Bay Area's orbit as well. Bakersfield, traditionally a boom-bust oil town once described by urban scholar Joel Kotkin as an "American Abu Dhabi", has seen a massive influx of former Los Angeles business owners and commuters, to the extent that gated communities containing million-dollar homes are going up on the city's outskirts. Wal-Mart, IKEA, Target, Amazon, CVS Pharmacy, Restoration Hardware, and other various large shipping firms have built huge distribution centers both in the southern end of the valley and northern part of the valley because of quick access to major interstates and low local wages. Further integration with the rest of the state is likely to continue for the foreseeable future.

== Infrastructure ==
=== Transportation ===
==== Roads ====
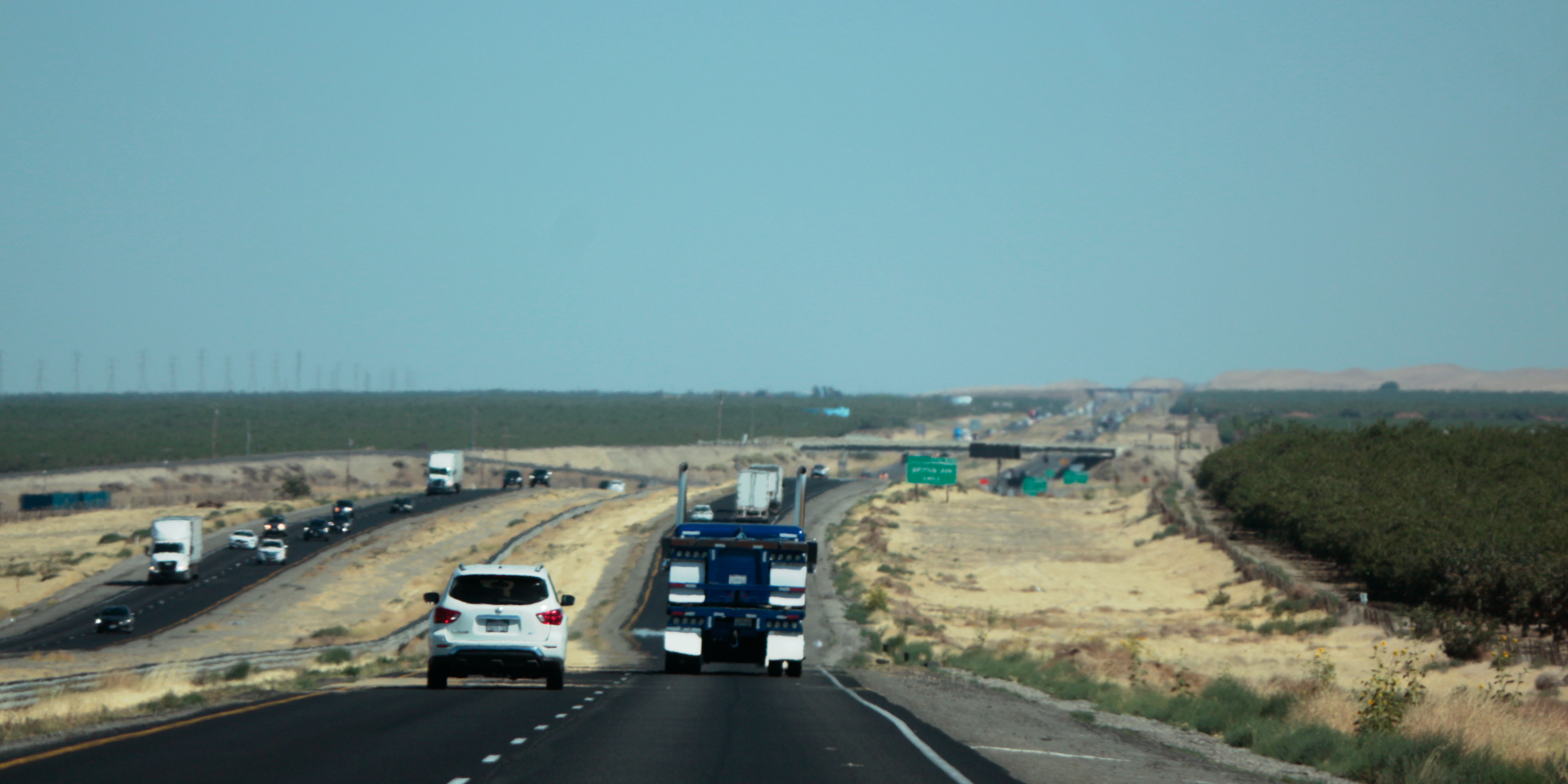
The valley as seen from Interstate 5, looking south near Derrick Avenue in Fresno County

Interstate 5 (I-5) and State Route 99 (SR 99) each run nearly the entire length of the San Joaquin Valley. I-5 runs in the western part of the valley, bypassing the major population centers (including Fresno, currently the largest U.S. city without an Interstate highway), while SR 99 runs through them. Both highways then merge at the southern end of valley en route to Los Angeles. When the Interstate Highway System was created in the 1950s, the decision was made to build I-5 as an entirely then-new freeway bypass instead of upgrading the then-existing U.S. 99. Since then, state and federal representatives have pushed to convert SR 99 to an Interstate, although this cannot occur until all of the portions of SR 99 between I-5 and the U.S. 50 junction in Sacramento are upgraded to Interstate standards.

State Route 58 (SR 58), which is a freeway in Bakersfield and along most of its route until its terminus in Barstow, is an extremely important and very heavily traveled route for truckers from the valley and the Bay Area who want to cross the Sierra Nevada and leave California (by way of Interstate 15 or Interstate 40) without having to climb Donner Pass or brave the traffic congestion of Los Angeles. Proposals have also been made to designate this highway as a western extension of I-40 once the entirety of the route between Mojave and Barstow has been upgraded to a freeway. This would provide an Interstate connection for Bakersfield, currently the second-largest U.S. city without an Interstate. The most recent additions to this system are State Routes 168 and 180. Route 168 begins in Fresno on Route 180 linking to Huntington Lake in the mountains through Clovis and many smaller communities. This route is part of the California Freeway and Expressway System and is eligible for the State Scenic Highway System. State Route 180 is a state highway which runs through the heart of the San Joaquin Valley from Mendota through Fresno to Kings Canyon National Park. A short piece near the eastern end, through the Grant Grove section of Kings Canyon National Park, is not state-maintained. The part east of unbuilt State Route 65 near Minkler is eligible for the State Scenic Highway System; the road east of Dunlap is the Kings Canyon Scenic Byway, a Forest Service Byway.

Other important highways in the valley include State Route 46 (SR 46) and State Route 41 (SR 41), which respectively link the California Central Coast with Bakersfield and Fresno; State Route 33 (SR 33), which runs south to north along the valley's western rim and provides a connection to Ventura and Santa Barbara over the Santa Ynez Mountains; and State Route 152 (SR 152), an important commuter route linking Silicon Valley with its fast-growing exurbs such as Los Banos.

==== Air ====
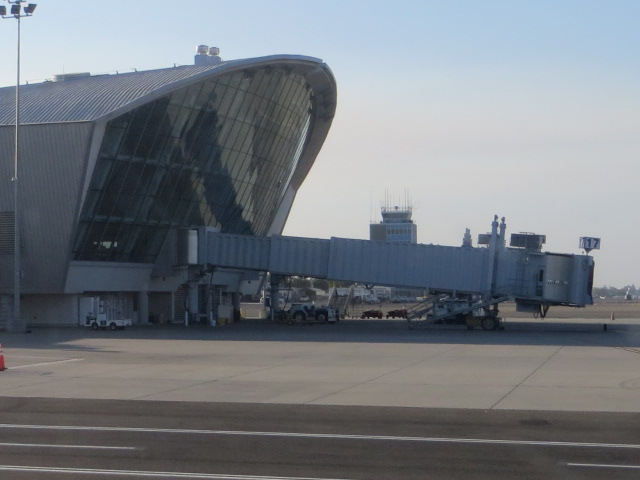
Fresno Yosemite International Airport terminal

The major airport in San Joaquin Valley is the Fresno Yosemite International Airport, which offers scheduled passenger flights to several major airline hubs in the United States and international service to Mexico. Additionally, there are three non primary airports in the region: Meadows Field Airport near Bakersfield, Stockton Metropolitan Airport and Merced Municipal Airport.

==== Rail ====
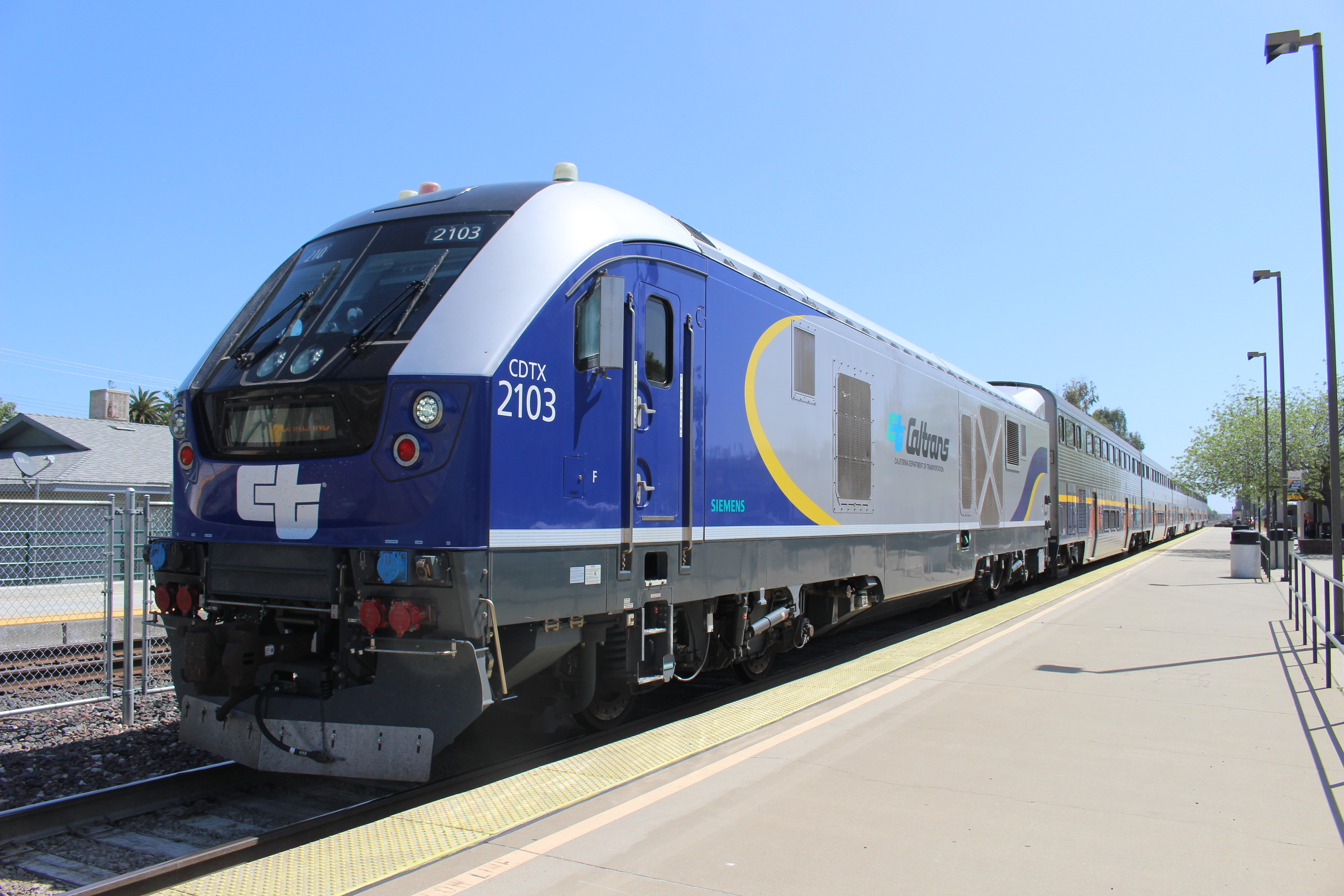
San Joaquins train at Merced station

The Gold Runner service handles passenger traffic between Bakersfield and Stockton with extensions to either Sacramento or Oakland. Amtrak rail service does not continue south of Bakersfield, as the Union Pacific Railroad does not currently allow the Gold Runner trains to run on the highly congested rail route over Tehachapi Pass, which is the only route between Bakersfield and Los Angeles. Passengers between these towns must travel on Amtrak Thruway buses. The San Joaquin Valley is also the location of the planned initial operating segment of the California High-Speed Rail (CAHSR) project, which will run 171 miles from Bakersfield in the south to Merced in the north.

Freight service is provided by BNSF Railway, Union Pacific Railroad and San Joaquin Valley Railroad.

=== Electricity ===
The valley is served by the Western Area Power Administration. Western owns and operates its own equipment here and so performs its own weed management. Rotating and mixing herbicide modes of action are employed to preserve efficacy.

== Public health ==
=== Air pollution ===
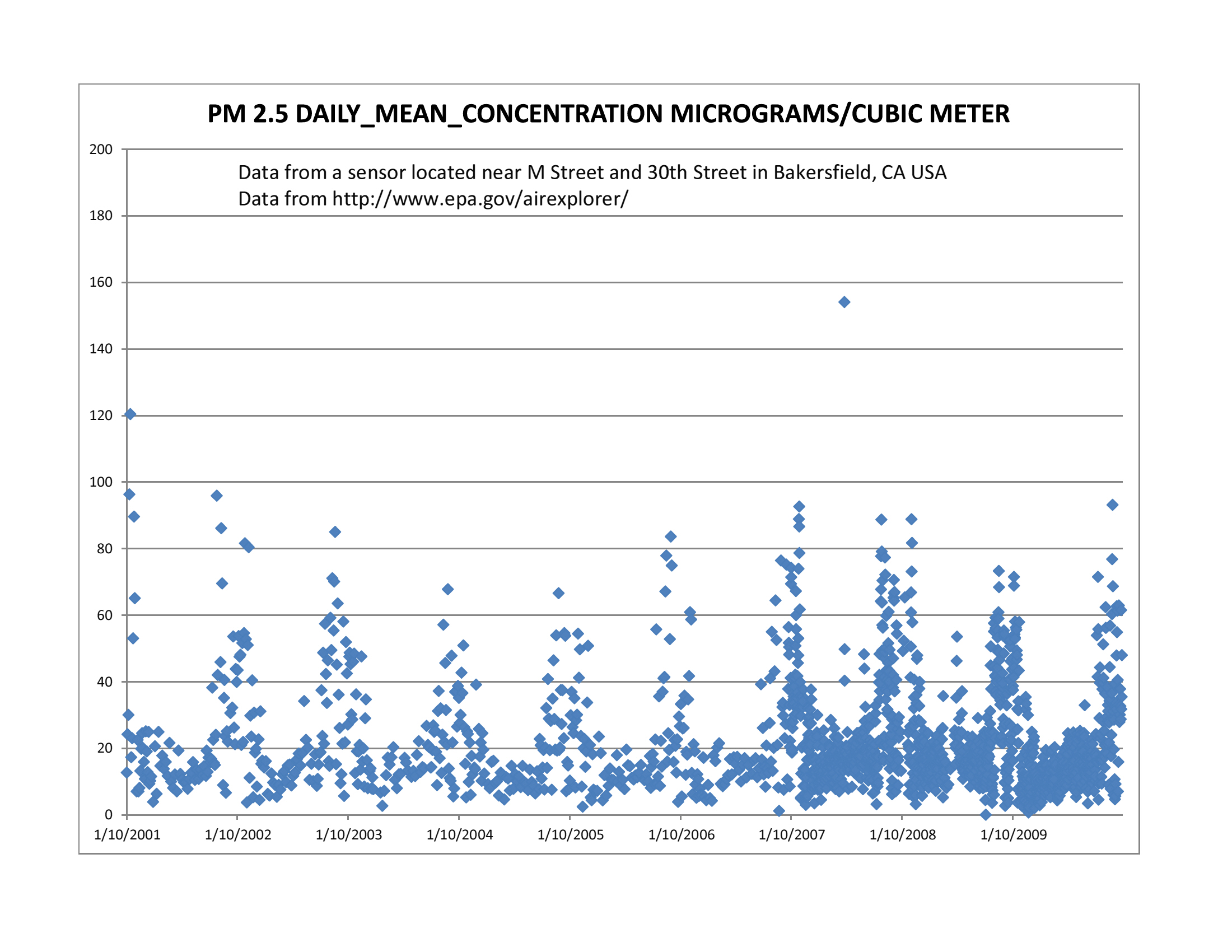
PM 2.5 pollution over time

Located between mountains, and rarely having strong winds to disperse smog, the San Joaquin Valley has some of the United States' worst air pollution, with a PM2.5 measure of 17 micrograms per cubic meter of air, compared to the California's Ambient Air Quality Standard of 12 micrograms per cubic meter, and the National Ambient Air Quality Standard of 9 micrograms per cubic meter. Some of the San Joaquin Valley's sources of air pollution are vehicle emissions, agricultural practices, and crop and wildfires. The use of diesel and gasoline fueled vehicles produces an excess of nitrogen oxides (NOx), eventually forming nitric acid that reacts with ammonia gas from cow manure and urine to create the ammonium nitrate that "accounts for more than half of the region's PM2.5 on the area's most polluted days." Exacerbated by stagnant weather and the temperature drop of the cooler seasons, much of the air pollution becomes trapped beneath a layer of warmer air, resulting in a phenomenon known as temperature inversion and condensing the accumulation of pollutants within the valley.

Population growth has caused the San Joaquin Valley to rank with Los Angeles and Houston in most measures of air pollution. Only the Inland Empire region east of Los Angeles has worse overall air quality, and the San Joaquin Valley led the nation in 2004 in the number of days with quantities of ozone considered unhealthy by the Environmental Protection Agency. The San Joaquin Valley has been deemed an "extreme non-attainment zone" by the Environmental Protection Agency, meaning residents are exposed to air quality that is confirmed to be hazardous to human health.

==== Crop loss ====
The region of the San Joaquin Valley has some of the richest soil that allows for the production of many crops. Crops in this region include: grapes, oranges, cotton, vegetables and nuts. The plethora of crop land allows for the valley to benefit from the income of crop sales. About sixty percent of California's crops come from the land in this area. However, the unhealthy air levels that arise from smog lead to the destruction of many crops. According to the California Air Resources Board the San Joaquin Valley loses about one billion dollars every year due to the pollution in the air destroying these crops. When crops die off, farmers sometimes burn the waste as a convenience and inexpensive way to clear land and dispose of waste. Crop burning worsens the air quality, and contribes roughly 4% of the San Joaquin Valley's fine particle pollution.

==== Negative effects on public health ====
The San Joaquin Valley suffers from extremely high ozone levels that tend to increase even more on hot days. Kids are more inclined to play outdoors during summer when the weather is warmer. According to the United States Environmental Protection Agency this could lead to health issues such as asthma because these children are not fully developed yet. According to the American Lung Association, roughly one in six children in this region suffer from asthma due to the poor air quality. The elderly population is also vulnerable to air pollution and could even suffer from heart attacks due to decreased lung functions. Reports state that the residents in this community suffer from high rates of asthma and experience many related symptoms. The American Lung Association attributes the noxious gas in the San Joaquin Valley to roughly 1,300 premature deaths every year, including public impacts such as lost days of school or work and emergency room visits. Due to the frequency of these extreme cases, the San Joaquin Valley has lost as much as $11 billion each year.

=== Nitrates in groundwater ===
San Joaquin Valley is a major agricultural center of California. The agricultural demand for water far outstrips the urban and industrial demand. Overuse of nitrogen fertilizers and irrigated agriculture is common, and according to Thomas Harter, the chair for Water Resources Management and Policy at UC Davis, "more than 80 pounds of nitrogen per acre per year may leach into groundwater beneath irrigated lands, usually as nitrates". Between the 1950s and 1980s, when nitrogen fertilizer use grew sixfold, nitrate concentrations in groundwater increased 2.5 times. Fertilizer runoffs contributes roughly 90% of all nitrate inputs to the alluvial groundwater system. Within agriculture, the two major factors are High-Intensity Crop Production and Large Dairy Herds. Because these communities are cut off from larger water distribution, they are dependent on wells, making groundwater a source of drinking water for 90% of San Joaquin Valley's residents.

Nitrates have found their way into the aquifers around the San Joaquin Valley, affecting over 250,000 people in communities that are poor and rural. In 2006, the State Water Resources Board took samples from domestic wells in Tulare County; they found that 40% of 181 domestic wells had nitrate levels above the 10 mg/L legal limit. Though locals have typically used filters for their water, the filters need to be installed correctly and replaced frequently, which may not be economically feasible for the residents in Orosi. Table 2 on page 20 from Pacific Institute's "The Human Costs of Nitrate-contaminated Drinking Water in the San Joaquin Valley" indicates the water systems that were contaminated with nitrates over the legal limit, the percentage of the population affected that are non-white and that are below or near poverty-level, and the year since the violations began.

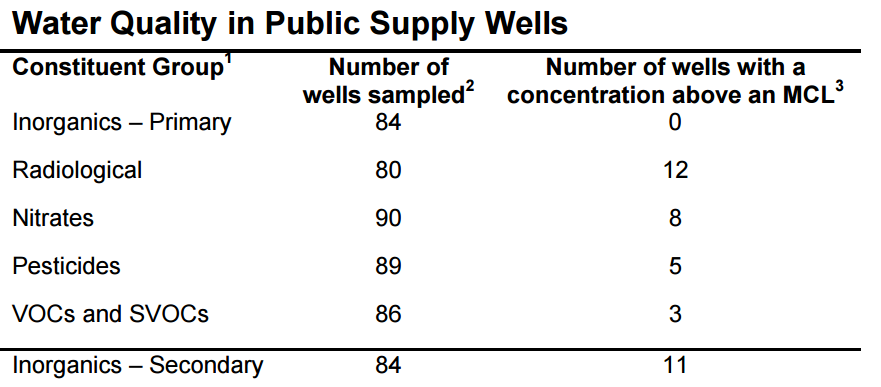
Water quality in public supply wells of Turlock in 2006

The Turlock Basin is a sub-basin of the San Joaquin Valley groundwater basin found within Stanislaus County and Merced County in the Central Valley. In California's Groundwater Bulletin 118, a chart, linked below, illustrates the number of non-compliant public supply wells with nitrates over the MCL. According to this chart, there were eight wells which had nitrate levels above the 10 mg/L MCL, out of 90 sampled for nitrates in 2006.

Nitrates are of concern because it interferes with the blood's ability to carry oxygen, and can have severe health effects on pregnant women, infants under 6 months, and children using tap water for their formula. Because nitrates interfere with blood's capacity to carry oxygen, infants are at high risk of death from blue-baby syndrome, which can occur when there are high nitrate levels in the blood that are untreated.

==== High-intensity crop production ====
Within the past century, farmers have been increasing their production to meet high demand. To increase output and efficiency, farmers have increased the amount of fertilizers used, including nitrates. Because only a fraction of the nitrogen in fertilizers is efficiently used to help produce crops, this has led to a greater concentration of nitrates and phosphates in the waters, causing eutrophication and contamination of possible drinking water.

==== Large dairy herds ====
Before the rapid rise in demand for meat products and dairy, roaming dairy herds had contributed an insignificant amount of nitrate pollution to the underlying groundwater systems. However, within the past few decades, the increasing amount of cattle has been one of the main contributors of nitrate contamination in the groundwater systems of California. Roughly around 1960, cattle were openly grazing pastures, and because of the large amount of lands which they roamed manure was not intensively managed. However, even though manure was not closely managed, "Nitrogen excretion and deposition in pastures likely did not exceed pasture buffering capacity and had no significant leaching to groundwater". Since the transition to dry-lot and free stall-based dairy farming in the mid-1970s, coupled with irrigated forage crops, dairy herds have contributed to nitrogen contamination.

==== Possible solutions and alternatives ====
The large dairy herds create manure, which is used to create the fertilizers that is applied to the crop fields. As demand for crops increases, farmers look to lower the costs of production. Using manure-based fertilizers is cost effective since manure is a by-product of large dairy farms and herds. The alternative to manure, which contains a high level of nitrates, is composting. Composting however is relatively expensive compared to using manure as fertilizer, since it is not as effective and is more timely/costly to make because of the large amount of aeration needed.

=== Non-fluoridation of tap water ===
Fluoridation is adding an element of fluoride to drinking water to reduce the occurrence of dental issues like tooth decay. Cal Water requires fluoride in water systems if public funding is available. In 2011, the Stockton city council asked its waterworks for grants and other sources of funding of $4.6 million to add fluoride to water that will serve approximately 280,000 people.

=== Valley Fever ===
Valley Fever, or coccidioidomycosis, is a fungal infection caused by Coccidioides immitis through the inhalation of airborne dust or dirt. The valley is just one of the areas in the southwestern United States where the illness is endemic due to C. immitis residing in the soil.

== Cities and counties ==
=== Cities with more than 500,000 inhabitants ===
- Fresno

=== Cities with 100,000 to 500,000 inhabitants ===
- Bakersfield
- Clovis
- Modesto
- Stockton
- Visalia

=== Cities with 20,000 to 100,000 inhabitants ===
- Atwater
- Ceres
- Corcoran
- Delano
- Dinuba
- Galt
- Hanford
- Lathrop
- Lemoore
- Lodi
- Los Banos
- Madera
- Manteca
- Merced
- Oakdale
- Patterson
- Porterville
- Reedley
- Riverbank
- Sanger
- Selma
- Shafter
- Tracy
- Tulare
- Turlock
- Wasco

=== Cities with fewer than 20,000 inhabitants ===
- Arvin
- Avenal
- Chowchilla
- Coalinga
- Dos Palos
- Escalon
- Exeter
- Farmersville
- Firebaugh
- Fowler
- Gustine
- Hughson
- Kerman
- Kettleman City
- Keyes
- Kingsburg
- Lindsay
- Livingston
- McFarland
- Mendota
- Newman
- Orange Cove
- Parlier
- Ripon
- San Joaquin
- Taft
- Waterford
- Woodlake

== Music and literature ==
The valley has been the home to many country, nu metal, and doo-wop musicians and singers, such as Buck Owens, Merle Haggard, Billy Mize, Korn, Red Simpson, Dennis Payne, Tommy Collins, the Maddox Brothers and Rose, The Paradons, The Colts, and the Sons of the San Joaquin. The San Joaquin Valley is also home to many indie hip hop labels, R&B singers, jazz and funk musicians, and hip hop artists such as: Kottonmouth Kings, Fashawn, Killa Tay, The Def Dames, Cali Agents and Planet Asia. The valley also has a strong literary tradition, heavy in poetry, producing many famous poets such as Sherley Anne Williams, and Gary Soto, former U.S. Poet Laureate Juan Felipe Herrera, and David St. John.

== See also ==
- Groundwater-related subsidence
- List of California rivers
- Sacramento Valley
- San Joaquin (soil)
- Water in California
