= Woogie Weekend =

- Festival goers during Woogie Weekend
- Genre: Electronic dance music
- Dates: July 17–19, 2015; July 8–10, 2016
- Location: Silverado, CA
- Years active: 2015–2019, 2021
- Founders: The Do LaB
- Website: http://woogiewknd.com

Woogie Weekend is a transformational festival in Silverado, California presented by The Do LaB, a Los Angeles based event production team. Originating as a stage at the Lightning in a Bottle music festival, Woogie Weekend became a separate event featuring electronic dance music, specifically house music, breakbeat, trance, and techno.

Woogie Weekend is a festival which mixes of music, dance, art, and culture. While music is the most prevalent aspect, there is also an emphasis on sustainability, environmentalism, yoga, healthy food, and Leave No Trace philosophy. Woogie Weekend also offers amenities for its attendees to enjoy such as camping, a giant Slip 'N Slide, and a playground.

The festival offers main stages known as The Hive and The Beat Nest as well as after-party venues called Dusk and Dawn located in the campgrounds.

Woogie Weekend originated from Lightning in a Bottle, a music festival created by The Do LaB in 2000. Lightning in a Bottle featured what was originally a minor stage known as The Woogaloogie, which was later renamed The Woogie. The stage was conceived and designed by The Do LaB co-founder Josh Flemming. As The Woogie grew in popularity, the decision was made to create a separate event based on the stage. The Woogie Weekend festival subsequently premiered on July 17, 2015, at Oak Canyon Park in Silverado, California, where the Lightning in a Bottle festival had been held from 2010 to 2013.

== See also ==
- Lightning in a Bottle
- Burning Man
- Lucidity (festival)
- Coachella Valley Music and Arts Festival
