= The Verigolds =

- Origin: San Diego / California
- Genres: Indie Rock
- Years active: 2014–present
- Members: Jenna Cotton - Vocals; Eliot Ross - Guitar/Vocals; Spence Noble - Drums; Ben Smedley - Keyboard
- Past members: Craig Schreiber - Drums
- Website: www.sandiegoreader.com/bands/verigolds/

The Verigolds are a San Diego–based indie band blending psychedelic, folk and pop music. They performed at music festivals KAABOO in 2016 and Lightning in a Bottle in 2018. Their music has been featured in The Huffington Post and National Geographic and their album "For Margaret" won Best Indie Album at the San Diego Music Awards in 2017. Also in 2017, The Verigolds released the single "Walk on Water" which was recorded and produced by Ed Stasium.
