= Polish Transhumanist Association =

Polish nonprofit organization

- Polskie Stowarzyszenie Transhumanistyczne
- Abbreviation: PSTH
- Formation: 2017
- Type: Nonprofit
- Headquarters: Warsaw, Poland
- Members: Open to Polish citizens
- President: Mateusz Łukasiak
- Board of directors: Rachel Palm; Michał Jaskulski; Maciej Zając; Tomasz Romanowski
- Audit Committee: Piotr Raczak; Michał Kasprzak; Dominik Ryniak
- Website: www.psth.pl

Polish Transhumanist Association (Polskie Stowarzyszenie Transhumanistyczne, PSTH) is a Warsaw-based nonprofit organization established in 2017 that promotes research and public discussion on human enhancement and the ethical, social, and technological implications of emerging technologies. Its activities include organizing interdisciplinary conferences, lectures, and workshops in collaboration with academic and cultural institutions across Poland.

== History ==
PSTH was founded in 2017 by a group of scientists, entrepreneurs, medical professionals, programmers, and technology enthusiasts. From its inception, the association has aimed to foster critical reflection on the future of humanity by convening experts from diverse fields to debate topics such as biohacking, artificial intelligence, and cybernetic augmentation.

== Activities ==
- Academic conferences: Academic conferences: Since 2017, PSTH has organized the annual national scientific conference "Transhumanizm: Idee, Strategie, Wątpliwości". The first edition took place on December 9, 2017, at the Institute of Philosophy, University of Warsaw, featuring 15 speakers across six thematic panels. The fourth edition was held in 2022 at the State Ethnographic Museum in Warsaw. In June 2019, PSTH also co-organized the conference "Ludzkie i nie-ludzkie oblicza transhumanizmu" (Human and Non-Human Faces of Transhumanism) at the Maria Curie-Skłodowska University in Lublin, alongside the Faculty of Philosophy and Sociology and the UMCS Cognition Circle.
- Interdisciplinary lectures: A PSTH member delivered the lecture "Starzenie, śmierć i długowieczność. Perspektywa biomedyczna, etyczna i systemowa" (Aging, Death and Longevity: Biomedical, Ethical, and Systemic Perspectives) in December 2019, as reported by the independent IVITER portal. On 16 May, PSTH organized a public meeting in Warsaw titled "Jeśli transhumanizm, to czemu nie GMO?" (If Transhumanism, Then Why Not GMO?), which provided a forum to examine how opposition to genetically modified organisms in Europe affects the development of biotechnology. Additionally, on May 23, 2024, in cooperation with the Polish-Japanese Academy of Information Technology, PSTH organized an open lecture by Dr. Łukasz Kucharczyk entitled "Granice człowieczeństwa. Wokół Dukaja i transhumanizmu" (The Limits of Humanity: Around Dukaj and Transhumanism).
- Cultural partnerships: PSTH is listed among the partners of the Copernicus Festival in Kraków, a major annual science and philosophy event organized by the Copernicus Center and Tygodnik Powszechny Foundation. In addition, in 2021, PSTH was named as one of the organizers and partners of the Futurological Congress, alongside the Polish Society for Futures Studies (PTSP) and other organizations.
