= Dream Rockwell =

British artist and event creator

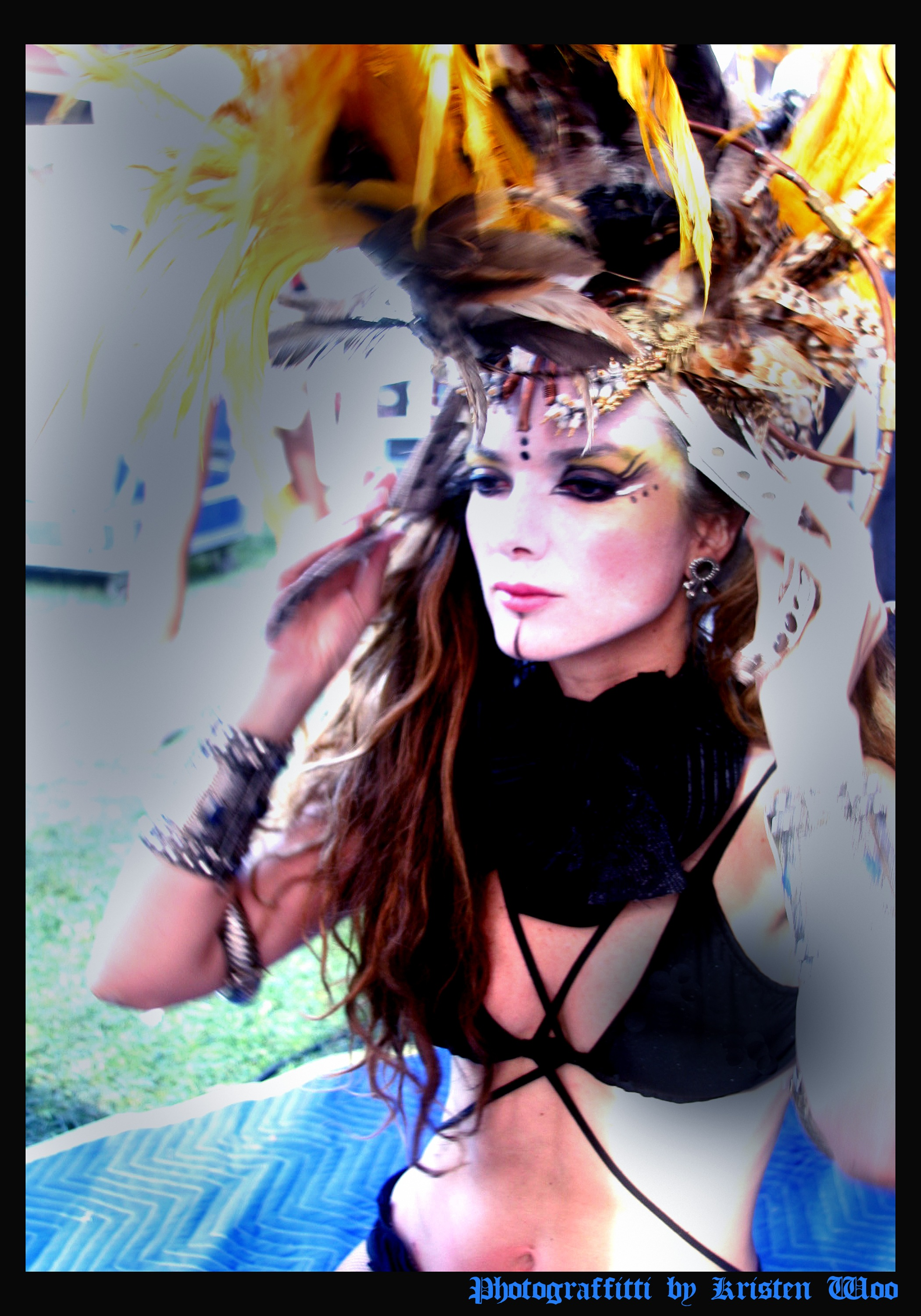
- Born: London
- Occupations: Artistic director, stage director, keynote speaker
- Known for: Lucent Dossier Experience, Lightning in a Bottle, The Do LaB

Dream Rockwell is an artist, director, keynote speaker, and multidisciplinary event creator with a focus on healing, longevity and biohacking. She has worked in festivals, cirque, rock music, electronic dance music shows, retreats and concert tours. She specializes in human transformation through the sharing of information, interactive theatre as well as immersive events and festival creation.

Past talks include TEDx Talks Vail, Leaders Causing Leaders, XLive, Burning Man, PPTOW, Worldz, Temple of Consciousness, One Love and many other conferences and festivals worldwide. Her subjects have included: Unleash Your Legend, YES AND...!, The Human Uplevel, Rise of the Feminine, Grace of Venus (her forthcoming book for young women) and Unraveling the Universe ~ Keys and Codes to the Matrix.

== Director, Producer and CCO ==
Rockwell directed the performance portions of Panic! at the Disco's VH1 award-winning video "I Write Sins not Tragedies". Their acceptance speech was infamously interrupted by Kanye West, something he also did to Taylor Swift, She went on to direct Panic! at the Disco's international sold out concert tour that followed the video's success. She directed The Duhks' video "Fast Paced World", and Mötley Crüe's last world tour with Aerosmith

Dream Rockwell is the founder and director of Lucent Dossier Experience, a "high-concept, steampunk-meets-neotribal", nouveau cirque circus troupe.

Dream Rockwell is a co-founder of DoLab originally The Do Lab, an event production company responsible for the music festival Lightning in a Bottle which Dream Rockwell co-founded and produced from its inception in 2004 – 2016. She invited artists and guests to their highly curated stages and custom designed immersive areas making LIB the first transformational festival to emerge out of the music festival scene.

In 2021, Rockwell became an adviser to the Crown Prince of Saudi Arabia for his city of the future, NEOM. She also co-founded a project in the deserts of Saudi Arabia called Karavan as the projects CCO.

== Early life and career ==
While studying in New York City, Rockwell founded and produced Lunatic Fringe, a monthly open mic poetry slam in the city.

She toured internationally with Madonna, contributing to the development of stage costumes and visual elements associated with the tour.

Prior to touring with Madonna she performed as a backup singer and dancer with Shania Twain.

Upon Moving to the US to study, Rockwell formed and performed in two 60's inspired electro-pop bands, VOXBOX and Willpilot.

== Philanthropy ==
Rockwell is the founder of Cuddle the World, an organization that takes teddy bears, cuddle blankets, inspirational toys and musical instruments to needy children around the world.

Rockwell enjoys a plant based diet and is interested in creating a cruelty-free world.

== Personal life ==
Rockwell is an adoptive parent and adopted a child in 2014.
