= Transformational festival =

Type of counterculture festival

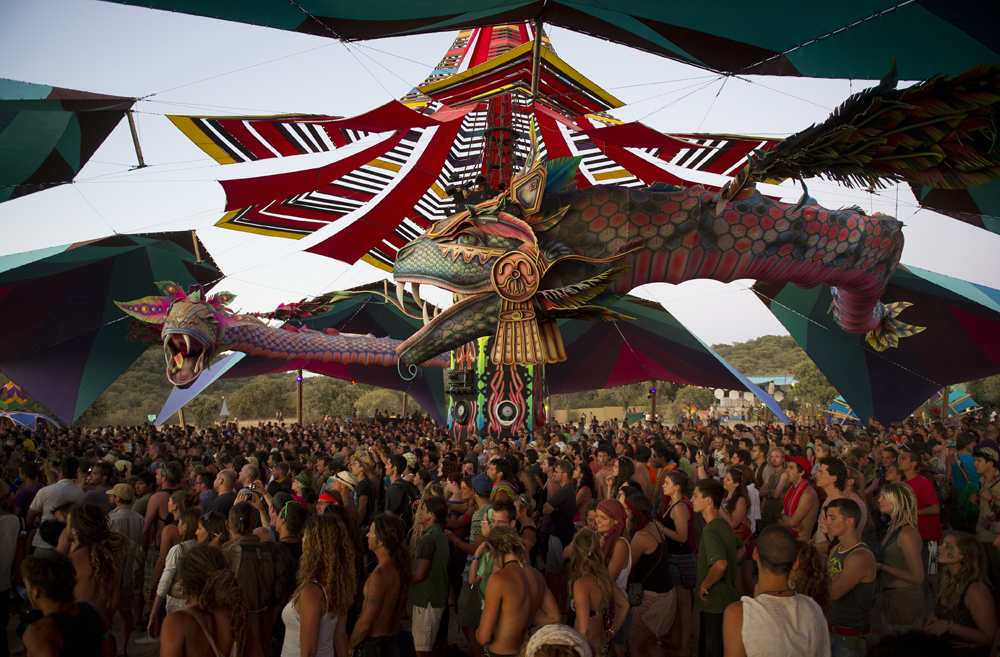
The Boom Festival is an International transformational Festival.

A transformational festival is a counterculture festival that espouses a community-building ethic, and a value system that celebrates life, personal growth, social responsibility, healthy living, and creative expression. Transformational alludes both to personal transformation (self-realization) and steering the transformation of culture toward sustainability. Some transformational festivals resemble music festivals, but are distinguished by such features as seminars, classes, drum circles, ceremonies, installation art (or other visual art), the availability of whole food and bodywork, and a Leave No Trace policy. Transformational festivals are held outdoors, often in remote locations, and are co-created by the participants.

Transformational festivals exhibit features commonly found in cults and new religious movements. The events are characterized by heightened transpersonalism, collective ecstasis, utopian narratives, and community allegiance. They attract the atypical attendance of a social class characterized by expendable amounts of financial and temporal wealth. Their charismatic deployment of spiritual and entheogenic information emboldened by on-site ecstatic experience closely parallels religious revivals. Attendees may disengage conservative social norms and identify as an "evolved culture"—a worldview influenced by millenarian archetypes of planetary transcendence, and the evolution of consciousness.

Some examples of transformational festivals are Yaga Gathering in Lithuania; Boom Festival in Portugal; Fusion Festival in Germany; Lightning in a Bottle, Symbiosis Gathering, and Lucidity in the United States. The prototypical transformational festival is Burning Man.

At TEDxVancouver 2010, filmmaker Jeet-Kei Leung presented a TED Talk about transformational festivals, and discussed their similarities to pagan festivals. Less than a year after a successful Kickstarter campaign, Jeet-Kei Leung and Akira Chan screened the first installment of their four-part documentary film series, The Bloom: A Journey Through Transformational Festivals (2013).

A.C. Johner's documentary Electronic Awakening (2012) investigates the emergence and origins of the festivals.

== See also ==
- Biocentrism (ethics)
- Deep ecology
- Free festival
- Intentional community
- Meditation music
- Rainbow Gathering
- Sacred dance
- Self care
- T.A.Z.: The Temporary Autonomous Zone, Ontological Anarchy, Poetic Terrorism (1991)
