= Electronic Awakening =

- Film poster
- Directed by: A.C. Johner
- Produced by: A.C. Johner
- Cinematography: A.C. Johner
- Edited by: Drew Martinez
- Production companies: Federation of Earth and Keyframe-Entertainment
- Release date: October 2, 2011
- Country: United States
- Language: English

Electronic Awakening is a 2011 American documentary film which investigates the spiritual history of electronic music culture. Told from an ethnographic perspective, the film explores the international Electronic Dance Music (EDM) phenomenon as the re-emergence of shamanic ritual. In addition to interviewing people whose lives were changed by the claimed transcendent experiences on the dancefloor, anthropologist and film's creator AC Johner ponders the cause of this mind-altering effect and suggests that the repetitive, mathematically perfect rhythms and oscillations of EDM have the power to create a communal hive mind.

The electronic beatscape propelled by the emergence in the late 1980s and early 1990s of something new and freshly synched. The primary emphasis of the documentary is the deeply spiritual basis of the cultures and practices that have developed around these parties, particularly trance music and the possibilities this spirituality might offer for ravers and the world in general. It is one of the first full-length documentaries to uncover the spiritual and transformational elements of EDM culture as a central theme.

== Production ==
Filming began in August 2006 in the form of university research, under a grant from Appalachian State University. The first footage collected were recorded interviews for director AC Johner's thesis work in anthropology. With growing popularity of EDM and the collected research, AC Johner continued filming over a period of 5 years featuring such Transformational festivals as Burning Man, Earthdance, Boom Festival, and Shambala Festival. In 2008, Johner licensed the project with his company, Federation of Earth Productions LLC. By the start of post-production over 200 hours of footage had been collected, 100 of which were formal interviews. In 2010, a successful Kickstarter campaign granted Johner finishing funds as well as a partnership with Keyframe-Entertainment to complete production.

== Post production ==
Post-production was carried out under AC Johner's Federation Of Earth Productions LLC. It also involved collaboration with Advanced Multimedia Operatives (AMMO), Julian Reyes of Keyframe-Entertainment joining as an executive producer, and Drew Martinez of Beechwood Cottage Films as editor. All editing, on-line, titles and effects were utilizing Final Cut Pro, Adobe After Effects, and Motion.

== Release ==
Electronic Awakening showed at Egyptian Theater in Hollywood, California, in March 2012. While never given an official theatrical release, it quickly gained popularity within the electronic music community, spawning independent screenings of the film at raves and music festivals all over the world. The film was released world-wide on Video-on-Demand through Gravitas Ventures on December 21, 2012. The DVD was released by North Atlantic Books and Random House.

== Cast ==
- Daniel Pinchbeck
- Alex Grey
- Ken Kesey
- Goa Gil
- Terence McKenna
- Erik Davis
- Starhawk
- Dr. Robin Sylvan

== Soundtrack ==
- Shpongle
- The Crystal Method
- Phutureprimitive
- Vibrasphere
- Solar Fields
- Random Rab
