= Erik Davis =

American writer (born 1967)

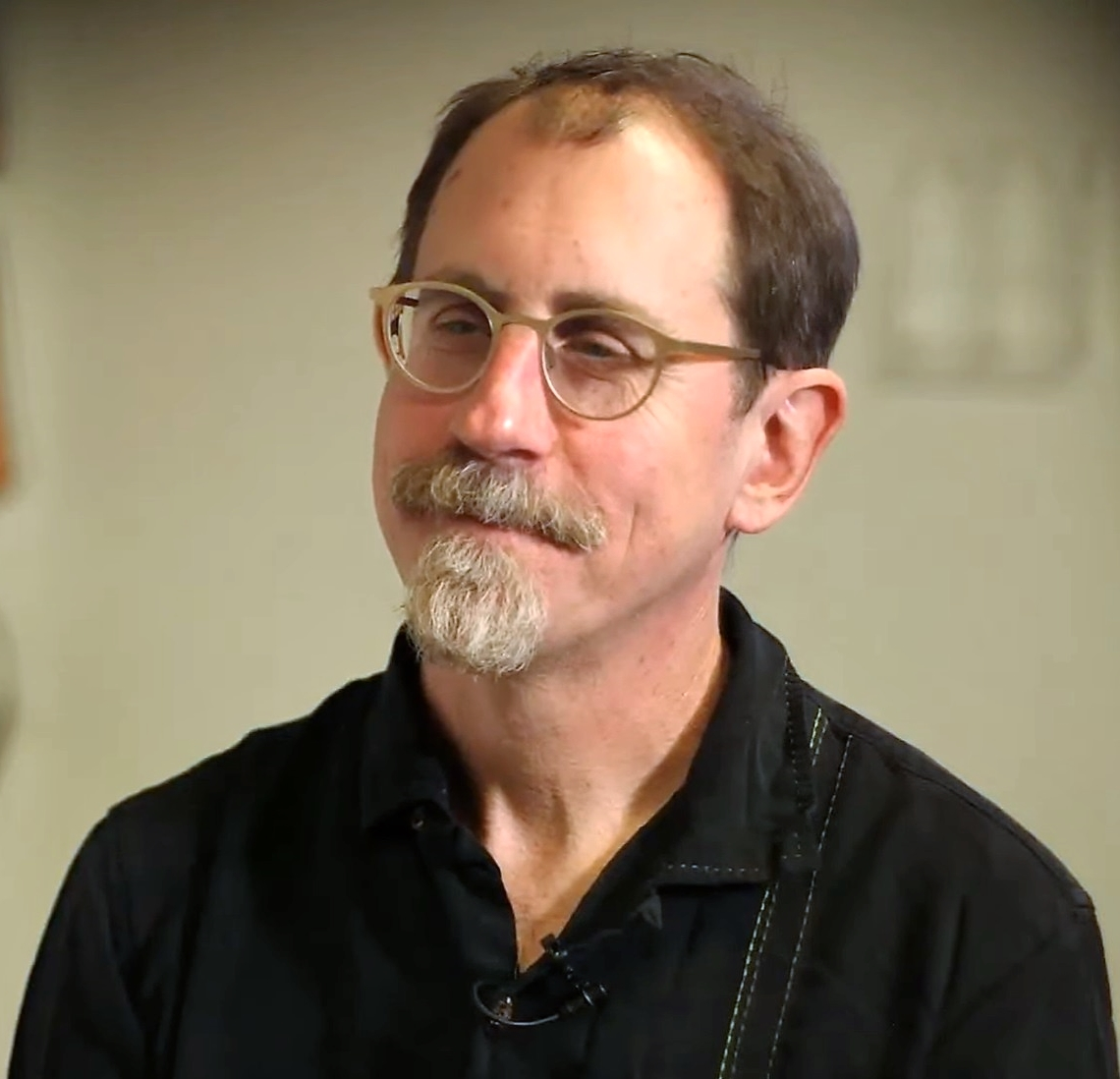
- Davis interviewed in 2019
- Born: June 12, 1967 (age 59); Redwood City, California, U.S.
- Education: Yale University; Rice University (PhD)
- Occupations: Author, cultural critic, freelance journalist, lecturer, radio talk show host
- Spouse: Jennifer Dumpert
- Website: techgnosis.com

Erik Davis (born June 12, 1967) is an American writer, scholar, journalist and public speaker whose writings have ranged from rock criticism to cultural analysis to creative explorations of esoteric mysticism. He is perhaps best known for his book Techgnosis: Myth, Magic and Mysticism in the Age of Information, as well as his work on California counterculture, including Burning Man, the human potential movement, and the writings of Philip K. Dick.

== Biography ==
=== Early years ===
Born in Redwood City, California, in 1967, Davis grew up in Del Mar before attending Yale University, where he graduated magna cum laude with a degree in English. He wrote a senior thesis on science fiction writer Philip K. Dick, and has since written a number of articles in the popular press about Dick and his unusual religious experiences. Davis would go on to co-edit The Exegesis of Philip K. Dick, which was published by Houghton Mifflin Harcourt in 2011.

While at Yale, Davis began writing for Nadine, an on-campus magazine that turned out a number of rock critics and pop culture writers in the 1980s and 1990s. Soon after graduation in 1988, Davis pitched his first story to the Village Voice, a review of the Swiss heavy metal band Celtic Frost.

=== 1990s ===
Writing for the Village Voice throughout the early 1990s, Davis also contributed to Spin, Details, Rolling Stone, and Wired magazines, writing about music, art, film, pop culture and technology.

In July 1995, Davis published a piece in Wired magazine called "Technopagans", which was one of the precursors for Techgnosis: Myth, Magic and Mysticism in the Age of Information, a dense cultural history of the mystical, magical, and apocalyptic dreams and fantasies that haunt modern technoculture. Published by Harmony Books, the book is a cult classic of media studies and was eventually translated into five languages. It was re-released in paperback by Serpent's Tail in 2004 with a new afterword.

Throughout the late 1990s and 2000s, Davis continued to write for both popular magazines and scholarly publications, and also expanded his speaking career, where his eclectic interests in subject ranging from music, art, popular culture and esoterica led to speaking engagements at such diverse venues as Stanford University, the British Museum, Burning Man, the Boom Festival, the Houston Jung Center, the Ojai Foundation, and Esalen.

=== 2000s ===
In 2000, Davis won a Maggie Award for his profile of UFO contactee and Silicon Valley mogul Joe Firmage.

In 2005, he released his second book, Led Zeppelin IV, a monograph on the signature album from one of rock’s most celebrated bands, published by 33 1/3. In 2006, Blender magazine included it in their list of the 40 Greatest Rock ‘N Roll Books.

In 2006, Davis released The Visionary State: A Journey Through California’s Spiritual Landscape, a coffee table book of pictures and rich essays about California’s alternative spiritual movements and architecture. With photographs by Michael Rauner, the book was published by Chronicle Books. A prolific blogger for his site Techgnosis.com, Davis also released a fourth book in 2010, a collection of essays and journalism entitled Nomad Codes: Adventures in Modern Esoterica, published by Yeti Publishing.

In early 2006, Davis started working with composer Mark Nichols on the libretto for a rock opera inspired by Burning Man. The resulting production debuted in October of 2009 and was entitled How to Survive the Apocalypse: A Burning Opera, in which Davis also performed as the bunny-suited, bullhorn-wielding narrator. Davis also wrote extensively about West Coast festival culture in photographer Kyer Wiltshire's 2009 book Tribal Revival.

=== 2010s and 2020s ===
In 2010, Davis began pursuing a PhD in Religious Studies at Rice University in their Gnosticism, Esotericism and Mysticism program. He has taught courses at UC Berkeley, UC Davis, Rice University, Pacifica, and CIIS.

Until 2019 he hosted the weekly podcast Expanding Mind along with Maja D’Aoust, devoted to the “cultures of consciousness” and part of the Progressive Radio Network.

Davis has appeared in a number of documentaries about technology and countercultural topics, including DMT: The Spirit Molecule, Electronic Awakening, The Source Family, A Glitch in the Matrix, and Hacking at Leaves.

In 2019 Davis published High Weirdness: Drugs, Esoterica, and Visionary Experience in the Seventies, an analysis of the thought of Philip K. Dick, Terence McKenna, and Robert Anton Wilson. The title is borrowed from Ivan Stang's 1988 book High Weirdness by Mail. In 2024 he published Blotter: The Untold Story of an Acid Medium, an examination of LSD blotter art.

== Books ==
- TechGnosis: Myth, Magic, and Mysticism in the Age of Information, Harmony Books, 1998; republished Serpents Tail, 2004.
- Led Zeppelin IV, Continuum Books, 2005.
- The Visionary State: A Journey through California’s Spiritual Landscape, with photographs by Michael Rauner, Chronicle Books, 2006.
- Nomad Codes: Adventures in Modern Esoterica, Yeti Books, 2010.
- High Weirdness: Drugs, Esoterica, and Visionary Experience in the Seventies, Strange Attractor/MIT Press, 2019.
- Blotter: The Untold Story of an Acid Medium, MIT Press, 2024.

== Selected articles ==
- "TechGnosis: Magic, Memory, and the Angels of Information," in Flame Wars: The Discourse of Cyberculture, ed. Mark Dery, Duke University Press, 1994.
- "Here is Postmodern Space," Burning Man, ed. Brad Wieners, Hardwired, 1997.
- “Technomancer: Philip K. Dick’s Signal Achievements,” War of the Words: The VLS Anthology on Contemporary Literature, ed. Joy Press, Three Rivers Press, 2001.
- “Synthetic Meditations: Descartes in the Matrix, ” in Prefiguring Cyberculture, eds. A. Cavallaro, A. Johnson, D. Tofts, MIT Press, 2002.
- “The Paisley Gate,” Zig Zag Zen, ed. Alan Hunt-Badiner, Chronicle Books, 2002.
- “Hedonic Tantra: Golden Goa’s Trance Transmission,” in Rave Ascension, ed. Graham St. John, Routledge, 2003.
- “” Book of Lies, ed. Richard Metzger, Disinformation, 2003.
- “Beyond Belief: The Cults of Burning Man,” in AfterBurn: Reflections on Burning Man, ed. Lee Gilmore and Mark Van Proyen, University of New Mexico Press, 2005.
- “Joanna Newsom: Always Coming Home,” Best Music Writing 2007, ed. Robert Christgau, Da Capo, 2007.
- Introduction, Mushroom Magick: A Visionary Field Guide, Arik Roper, Abrams, 2008.
- “Roots and Wires: Polyrhythmic Tricks and the Black Electronic,” in Sound Unbound: Writings on Contemporary Multimedia and Music Culture, ed. Paul Miller, MIT Press, 2008.
- Introduction,' Tribal Revival, with photographs by Kyer Wiltshire, 2009.
- “Kosmiche,” in Krautrock, ed. Nikolaos Kotsopoulos, Black Dog, 2009.
- "Babalon Launching: Jack Parsons, Rocketry, and the 'Method of Science' ", in Magic in the Modern World: Strategies of Repression and Legitimization, ed. Edward Bever and Randal Styers, Penn State University Press, 2017.
