= Yaga Gathering =

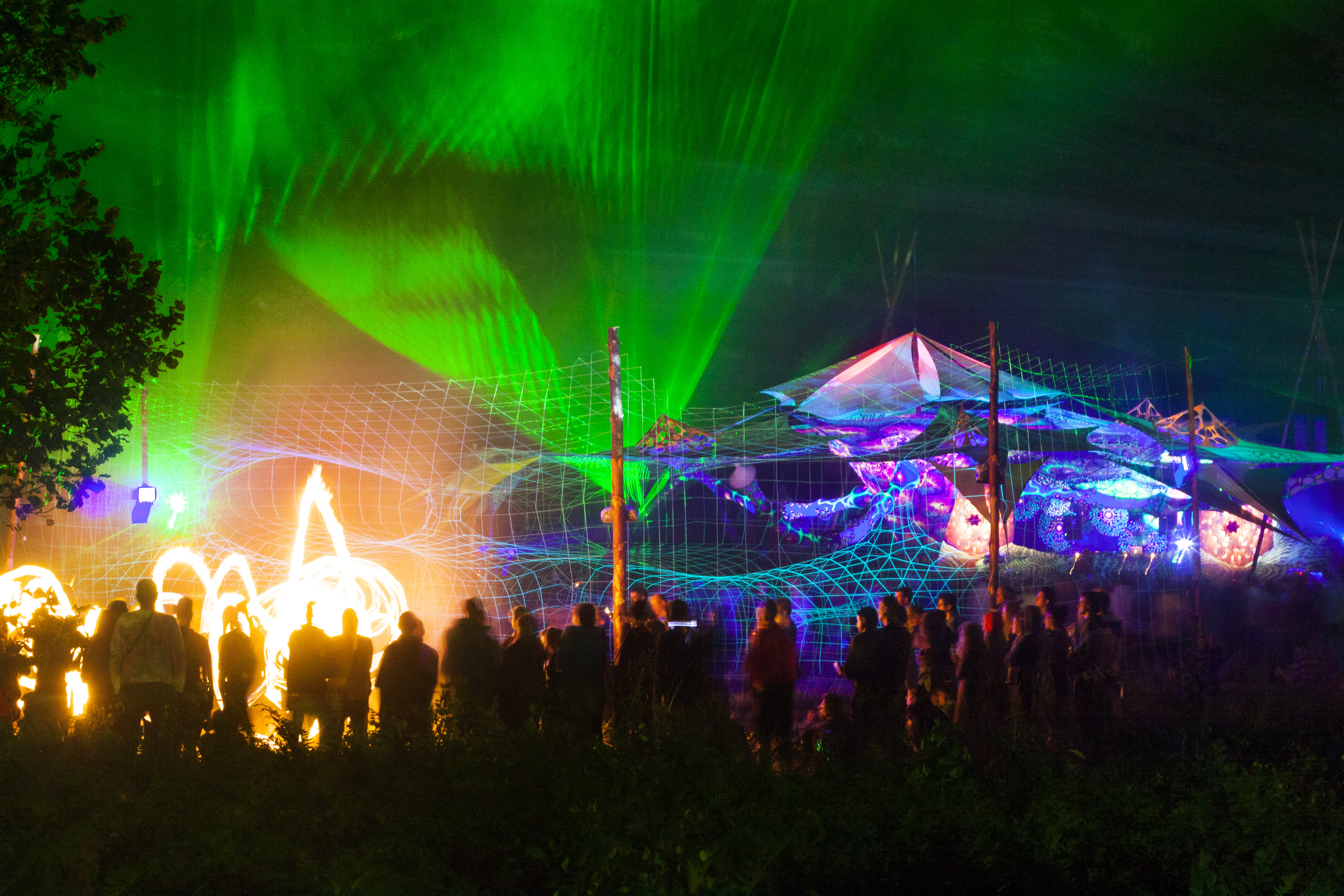
- Yaga Gathering 2013
- Genre: techno, electronic music, Experimental music, Psychedelic music, Psychedelic trance, chill-out music, ambient, dub techno
- Dates: July/August
- Locations: Spengla Lake, Varėna, Lithuania
- Coordinates: 54°20′14.80″N 24°46′31.60″E
- Years active: 2003–present
- Website: yaga.lt

Yaga Gathering is a participatory transformational festival hosted in a clearing in Ežeraitis Forest, at the edge of Spengla Lake in the Varėna District of southern Lithuania. The festival is known of having no corporate sponsors, while having more participatory and community-driven ethos. Yaga festival is part of European Festival Association Network.

== History ==
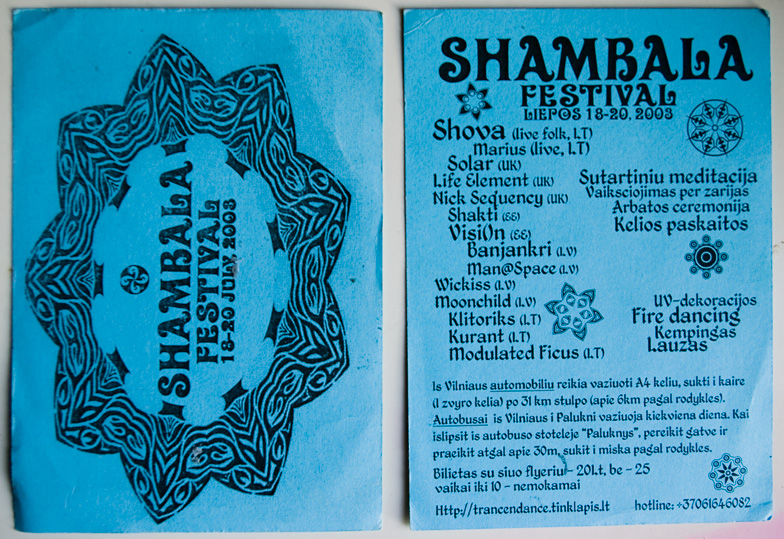
A flyer for Shambala Festival 2003

Initially, Yaga Gathering was called Shambala Festival—named for the mythical hidden kingdom of Shambhala. The first event took place from 18 to 20 July 2003; it was small (250 attendees). Organisers produced a second festival in 2005, and the third festival in 2006. In 2007 the festival was renamed as Yaga Gathering. Despite the growht to approach 5000 participants in 2024-2025 the site of the festival has remained in Ežeraitis Forest which in is about 60 kilometres (37 mi) south of Vilnius.

Most of the festival infrastructure is built using biodegradable materials. and it has been referred as one of the major experimental grounds for Liethuanian post-folklore electronic music.

== Contemporary (2020-) ==
Recent post-pandemic editions of Yaga Gathering (2024–2025) have attracted approximately 5,000 attendees. DJs and live bands from nearby countries perform across four music stages: the Valley Stage, the Pinegrove Stage, the Duskwood Stage, and the Outmost Stage. From its content, the festival has aimed to extend its outreach from psytrance to wider artistic approaches and feature participatory art installations, open-air cinema, the Discovery Stage for lectures and presentations, a healing area offering yoga and meditation sessions, a handicraft workshop area, and host a designated children’s area.

A feature in Wonderland Magazine describes Yaga Gathering as a countercultural festival held in the forests of Lithuania, combining trance music with spiritual and healing practices. The article notes that the event has grown from a small gathering into an international festival while maintaining its independence from corporate sponsorship and its emphasis on community and personal transformation.

== See also ==
- Counterculture
- Goa trance
