= Lucent Dossier Experience =

- Company type: Private company
- Industry: Entertainment
- Genre: Electro, Dubstep, Circus arts, Vaudeville, Cirque, Avant-garde, Steampunk, Performance art, Electronic rock, Breakbeat
- Founded: 2004
- Founder: Dream Rockwell
- Headquarters: Los Angeles, California, United States
- Area served: Worldwide
- Website: lucentdossier.com

Lucent Dossier Experience (whose name loosely translates to "a collection of glowing light") is a Los Angeles cirque style interactive, avant-garde circus, electronic rock band, performance troupe and entertainment company performing worldwide. The company's performances combine live original music and vocals with circus arts, dance, aerial arts and fire performance.

The troupe has been described as a "high-concept, steampunk-meets-neotribal performance ensemble" and its immersive spectacles as a "post-apocalyptic," "exotic wonderland". The company's headquarters are in the downtown fashion district of Los Angeles, California.

Performers in Lucent's theatrical spectacles include singers, musicians, acrobats, aerial artists, stilt walkers, fire dancers, tribal belly dancers, a wide variety of other dancers (hip hop, burlesque, and Tahitian), spoken word poets, clowns, contortionists, elves, a bearded lady, a snake charmer/dancer, jugglers, and a sword swallower.

Lucent Dossier's original music style creates a "surreal soundtrack" and has its base in electronica but uses live instruments to fill out the sound that include violins, sitars, guitars, drums, bass, hung, and more. Lucent Dossier Experience "is recognized for their interactive, surrealistic performance that breaks barriers between them and the audience". Over the years their original music has been produced by Dream Rockwell, Rick Alick and Super Tall Pall of Helios Jive, Chris Komashko, KRADDY, Atla Gadret, Metaphase, Nikita Sorkin, David Block, Stephan Jacobs, Maggie Lally, all under the collective Lucent Dossier Experience.

Lucent's aerial performers use both traditional aerial apparatus such as trapeze, aerial silk, aerial hoop, span sets, aerial rope or Spanish web, as well as custom-made aerial apparatus unique to the group, including a large aerial moon, mechanical Lotus flower, bird cage, Star tetrahedron, spider web, straps (similar in effect to a straitjacket), and aerial carousel.

Fire performers work with different styles of tools including fire staff, fire poi, fire fans, fire hoop, fire sword, fire knives, fire cups, fire rope, fire chains, aerial fire acts, and fire nunchaku.

The interactive portions of Lucent's performances include oracle or tarot readings, rose water foot baths, gypsies offering herbal elixirs, a tribal temporary tattoo parlor, a "Music Shack" where songs are custom-written, Post Portal Post Office where lost letters are delivered from other dimensions and performed on the spot for guests, and a "Transformation Station" where audience members can receive fantasy hair and makeup applications.

All the performers dress in fantastical costumes and makeup unique to Lucent Dossier. Their costuming often consists of recycled and found objects that might include the bones, wings, teeth and feathers of animals found dead either on the side of the road or in the forest. They are known for their custom body airbrush tattoo makeup, a look they originated in 2005. This tribal body art gives them their signature otherworldly, haute couture look.

== Company history ==
The pioneering immersive performance troupe was initially named Lucent Dossier Vaudevillians. Later it was renamed Lucent Dossier Vaudeville Cirque, and now Lucent Dossier Experience, though they are often referred to simply as Lucent Dossier.

The company is the brainchild of performer/artistic director Dream Rockwell. Lucent was a spinoff from The Do LaB, an art collective/event-creation company of which Dream Rockwell is a founder. Rockwell started Lucent after meeting and being inspired by Brent "Shrine" Spears (the Pasadena-based folk artist responsible for the design of the interior of the House of Blues chain and the 2008 Burning Man Temple), performer/choreographer Roger Fojas (formerly of the LA-based Dream Circus). Original company members include Jesselynn Desmond, Sarah Johnston, Brent Stevens and Orley Kulawy. They were later joined by Dayna Riesgo as Producer and production coordinator and Dana Guidry as manager and financial officer who spent 12 years with the company and was succeeded by Mike Kaminsky and later Andrew Cohen who also manages William Close and The Earth Harp. It is however Riesgo that would come to be the back bone of the company running all of its inside operations side by side with Rockwell.

Finding head aerialist Alicia Schultze in 2006 took the show off the ground and up into the air. The same year Rockwell found a young ballerina, Linda Borini who would bring an ethereal and strong dance presence to the company. In 2013 Borini became a producer for the company, taking on all NYC and World-Wide Lucent Productions. In the spring of 2010 Lucent released their first album, GATEWAY, with longtime Lucent violinist Nikita Sorkin and producer/drummer Metaphase. Other key performers include Sarah "Agent Red" Johnson who went on to create Crash Alchemy, Sarah Llewellyn, and Rajiv Jain who is head stage designer still today.

== Show history ==
The Awakening -included 21 performers and took place at the "Sea of Dreams" New Year's Eve party on December 31, 2004, in the historic Park Plaza Hotel in Los Angeles. Close to 4,000 people attended the event. The performers all dressed in white with tribal body paint, bones, feathers and Victorian lace.

EnchantSelf -A story about a village of elves living in life-size mushrooms.

"A Horse Named Tramp" -played only one night for Circo 6 at the historic Los Angeles Theater.

"The Forbidden Om" -designed and performed in a Buckminster Fuller geodesic dome. The show, an apocalyptic journey to another planet premiered at the Coachella Valley Music and Arts Festival 2006 before playing LIB, Electric Picnic Ireland, Serienetta Italy, Art Outside, Austin, Tx and several other dates around the world.

The F Show -first fire show

"Aquius" -(their first water show) at Coachella 2007, which subsequently toured to Lightning in a Bottle in Santa Barbara, California, Summer Sonic in Japan, and Electric Picnic in Ireland.

S. S. Lucent Dossier A larger scale water show, created for Coachella; the show later toured to Lightning in a Bottle, Alive! '08 in Portugal where the front cover of the Portugal Expresso declared "Bob Dylan left us disillusioned, but Lucent Dossier, with their acrobatic performances, more than made up for it. Lucent Dossier have caught fire more than any other band has been capable of doing in the long menu of performances offered by the organization. Not even Rage Against The Machine, that had put the arena for bullfighting on the main stage on thursday, could come close to the collective hypnosis obtained by the group", and Electric Picnic.

"Lucent Dossier at the Edison" In April 2008, the performers debuted a residence show that played to sold-out audiences for a year at The Edison in downtown Los Angeles. In 2009, they created their third and largest water show, which again debuted at Coachella and also toured to Ireland for Electric Picnic.

In the fall of 2009, they moved into a new residency at Hollywood club h.wood.

"Android Lover" In early 2010 they debuted "Android Lover" a collaboration with music producer KRADDY, founding member of The Glitch Mob, at Lucent L'Amore music festival in Los Angeles adding water and fire to reopen the show at Coachella Art and Music Festival. The show toured Europe in the summer of 2010.

"SHOWACIDE" In the spring of 2011 they returned to Coachella with their newest rock musical creation, SHOWACIDE. Inspired by a love letter they received from a fan who was contemplating suicide but came to a Lucent show as his last hope and was so inspired he changed his perspective and wrote to them telling them about his experience.

"When Lucent Met Herakut" Theatrical debut at Downtown Los Angeles' Palace Theater with German street artists Herakut.

"GATEWAY" Futuristic show using projection, fire, aerial, live music and vocalist debut was seen at Coachella 2012. This followed with the release of the GATEWAY album December 21, 2012.

"Lucent Encounter" NYC debut at the Liberty Theater in Time Square opened to sold out crowds and "was a flawless, wonderful, interactive experience" The show closed after five weeks. The club was over sold two weeks in a row and shut down by NYC Fire Department.

"AQUIOUS MYSTIFIED" Debuted at Coachella 2013 is a colorful and playful futuristic show that includes water, mist, projections, fire, drumming, acrobatics, dance, live vocals and electronic music.

"LIGHT OF THE WORLD TOUR" Inter-National tour that took the troupe across the US, Canada and Mexico. Included new music, water, projections, fire, drumming, acrobatics, dance, live vocals.

"UNLEASH YOUR FUNK" First funk hip-hop show.

The critically acclaimed troupe has also performed at concerts and events in England, Japan, Italy, Canada, Guatemala, and Mexico. They have been featured in television commercials, print advertisements, and music videos, in addition to their large-scale, live productions. They have performed at top clubs and corporate events throughout Los Angeles, on MTV with Panic! at the Disco, and at the official Grammy Awards Party.

The troupe has been photographed for Vogue Magazine twice, once by Steven Meisel for Italian Vogue in a feature entitled "The Greatest Show On Earth," and again in the January 2008 issue of L'Uomo Vogue (the Italian men's edition of Vogue). They were featured in the January 2010 issue of the Italian edition of Vanity Fair.

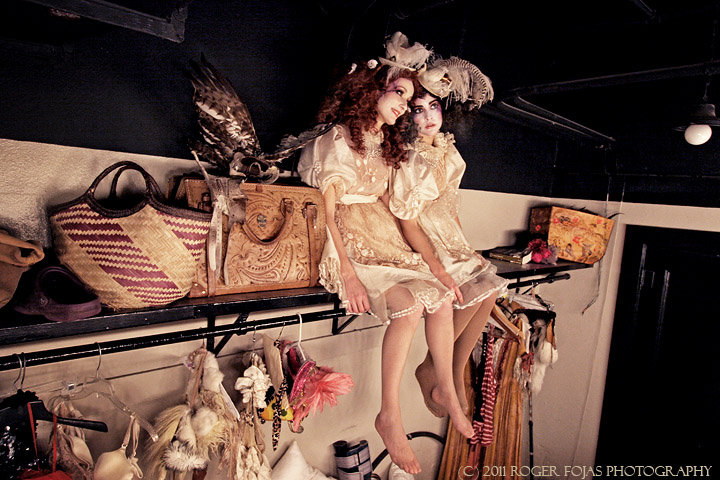
The Cape Premier in Los Angeles, Music Box Theater

== Festivals ==
Lucent Dossier Experience is perhaps best known for its festival performances and large scale fire and water shows. The troupe has performed at the following international art, music, and film festivals:

- 2024 – Burning Man (Black Rock City, NV) With sponsor AXON
- 2019 – Burning Man (Black Rock City, NV) With sponsor Brock Pierce
- 2018 – Burning Man (Black Rock City, NV) in the PlayAlchemist pyramid and sponsor GT Kombutcha
- 2017 – Clifton's DTLA Residency, Live Nation West Coast Tour, Shambhala Music Festival (Canada), Burning Man (Black Rock City, NV) With Guy Laliberté
- 2016 – Coachella (Indio, CA), Lightning in a Bottle (Silverado, CA), Shambhala Music Festival (Canada), Burning Man (Black Rock City, NV)
- 2015 – Wonderfruit in Thailand, at which Dream Rockwell also presented her talk titled "Unleash Your Legend" as part of Scratch Talks.
- 2014 – Coachella (Indio, CA), Lightning in a Bottle (Silverado, CA), Shambhala Music Festival (Canada), Burning Man (Black Rock City, NV)
- 2013 – Coachella (Indio, CA), Lightning in a Bottle (Silverado, CA), Sonic Bloom (CO), Body & Soul (Ireland), Burning Man (Black Rock City, NV)
- 2012 – Coachella (Indio, CA), Lightning in a Bottle (Silverado, CA), Desert Rocks (NV), Burning Man (Black Rock City, NV)
- 2011 – Coachella (Indio, CA), Lightning in a Bottle (Silverado, CA), Burning Man (Black Rock City, NV)
- 2010 – Coachella (Indio, CA), Lightning in a Bottle (Silverado, CA), BOOM (Portugal), 420 Festival (San Bernardino, CA), Electric Picnic (Laois, Ireland), Burning Man (Black Rock City, NV)
- 2009 – Coachella (Indio, CA), Burning Man (Black Rock City, NV), Electric Picnic (Laois, Ireland), Festival 8 with Phish (Indio, CA)
- 2008 – Coachella (Indio, CA), Lightning in a Bottle (Santa Barbara, CA), Alive! (Lisbon, Portugal), Electric Picnic (Dublin, Ireland)
- 2007 – Coachella (Indio, CA), Lightning in a Bottle (Santa Barbara, CA), Summer Sonic (Tokyo, Japan), Electric Picnic (Laois, Ireland), Burning Man (Black Rock City, NV)
- 2006 – Coachella (Indio, CA), Lightning in a Bottle (Santa Barbara, CA), Lollapalooza (Chicago, IL), Burning Man (Black Rock City, NV), Electric Picnic (Laois, Ireland), Elevate Film Festival (Hollywood, CA), BURLA (Braga, Portugal)
- 2005 – Lightning in a Bottle (Jack's Ranch, CA), Electric Daisy Carnival (Los Angeles, CA), Burning Man (Black Rock City, NV)

== Residencies ==
- Fall 2017 - Lucent Enchantment Society at Clifton's DTLA
- Oct 27th – Nov 24th 2012 – Lucent Encounter at the Liberty Theater in Time Square New York City
- July 28, Oct 21st & 22nd – The Palace Theater – Downtown Los Angeles
- November 2010 – February 2011 – Club Fresh (Goa, India) – Brought neo-tribal circus to South East Asia for the first time in Lucent Dossier's history. Reviewers said "The launch party was marked by dramatic performances by LA-California based Lucent Dossier who displayed Aerial acrobats and fire dancers."
- November 2009 – January 2010 – h.wood (Hollywood, California) – During this two-month residency, Lucent reconfigured their show conceptually to transform h.wood's labyrinth of rooms into a modern-day cabinet of curiosities with live human exotica. The residency closed with a New Year's Eve event at h.wood, Haute Cirque NYE 2010, which was named number 2 on KABC-TV's Top New Year's Eve celebrations in Southern California for the year.
- April 2008 – April 2009 – The Edison (Los Angeles, California) – This sold-out, year-long residency gave Lucent an opportunity to create new speakeasy style material in an immersive environment with intimate interaction between the performers and guests.

== Collaborations ==
Lucent Dossier Experience lent their style and performers for the creation of music video "I Write Sins, Not Tragedies" with band Panic! at the Disco; the video won Best Music Video of the Year at the 2006 MTV Music Awards. They also collaborated on a video, written and directed by Dream Rockwell, for "Fast Paced World" by Grammy-nominated Winnipeg band The Duhks.

The troupe has toured nationally and internationally with Panic! at the Disco, The Dresden Dolls, OK Go, Emilie Autumn, and Mötley Crüe with Aerosmith.

They have also shared the stage and/or billing with The Black Eyed Peas, Beats Antique, KT Tunstall, Thirty Seconds to Mars, Bassnectar, Michael Franti and Spearhead, Kraftwerk, The Jonas Brothers, Flaming Lips, Cyndi Lauper, Stanton Warriors, Devendra Banhart, Rabbit in the Moon, Madness and David Guetta.

On January 28, 2010 they appeared live with The Black Eyed Peas at the Palladium in Los Angeles, and on February 9, 2010 they shared the stage with longtime muse Perry Farrell. They appeared on Univision's "Primos De Sportes" Award Show with Mexican-American singer Pee Wee, shot at the historic Orpheum Theatre in downtown Los Angeles and nationally televised to over four million viewers. In October 2009, they opened for ska punk band Sublime in one of their few shows with new singer Rome Ramirez at a private event in Orange County. For New Year's Eve 2010 they opened for Michael Bolton at a private event in Louisiana. In 2011 they created a short concert and video with KT Tunstall and a team from Partizan Entertainment including directors SKINNY, Marc-Edouard Leon and David Hache.

== Cuddle the World ==
Cuddle the World is Lucent Dossier Experience's non-profit organization that brings interactive performance, musical instruments, clown noses, costumes, fairy wings, teddy bears and snuggle blankets to orphans around the globe. These children are in conditions where they receive very basic care but nothing more.
