= Lake Evans (California) =

Lake in California, United States

- Location within California Location within the United States
- Location: Kern County, California
- Coordinates: 35°14′00″N 119°17′55″W
- Type: Artificial
- Primary inflows: Kern River
- Basin countries: United States
- Built: 1973
- Max. length: 4,870 feet (1,480 m)
- Max. width: 1,210 feet (370 m)
- Surface area: 86 acres (35 ha)
- Surface elevation: 778 feet (237 m)
- Islands: 4
- Settlements: Bakersfield, California
- References: County of Kern Parks & Recreation

Lake Evans is a manmade recreational lake in Kern County, California. It is the smaller of two lakes in the Buena Vista Aquatic Recreation Area southwest of Bakersfield. The lake is primarily a sailing and fishing lake, with a speed limit of 5 miles per hour (8.0 km/h). It has two boat ramps. The lake is located on the lakebed of the former Buena Vista Lake.

== See also ==
- Lake Webb
- List of lakes in California
