= Lightning in a Bottle =

American annual music festival in California

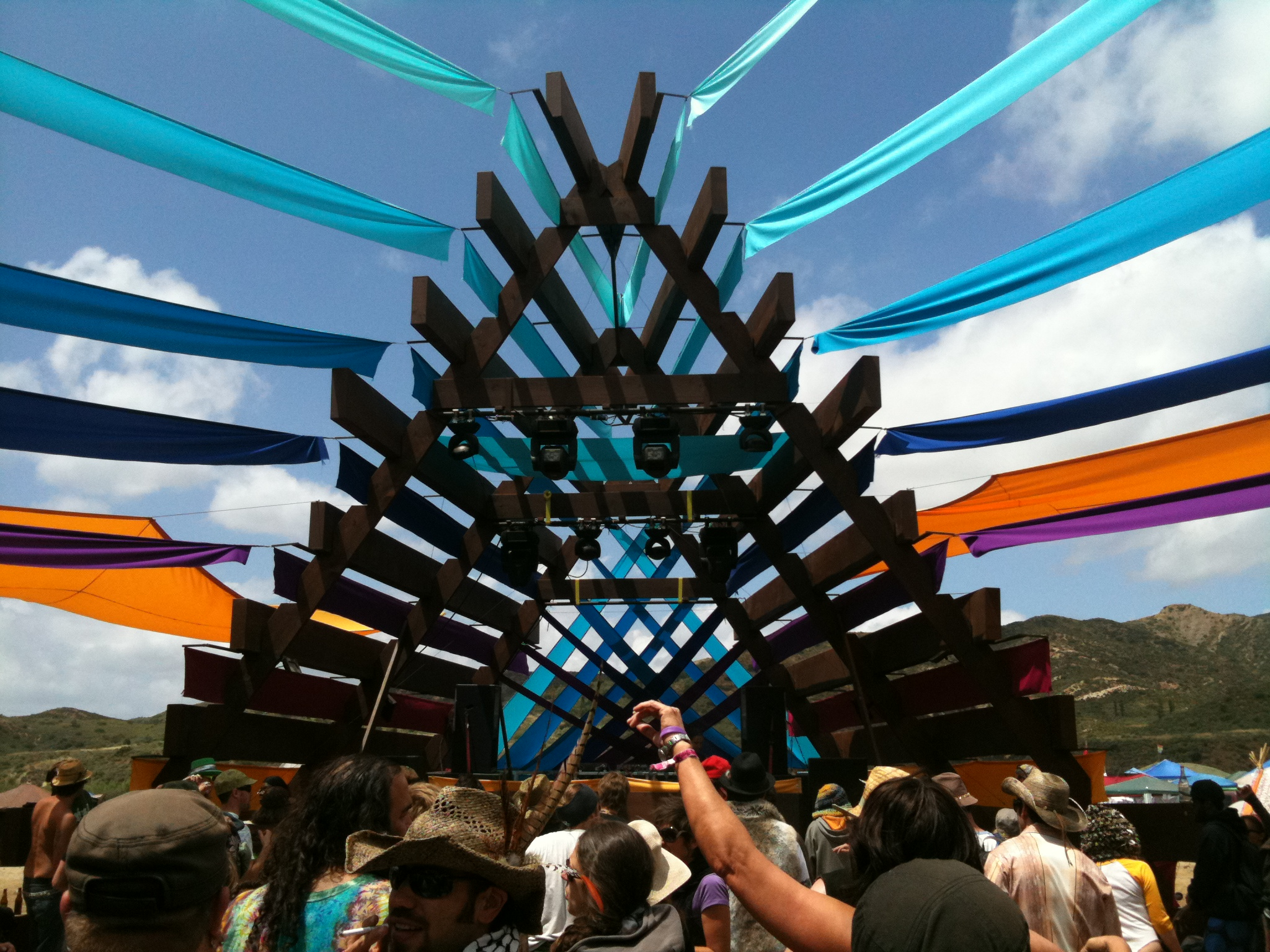
- 2011
- Genre: Electronic dance music, devotional music, experimental music, folk music
- Dates: May (2007–2019, 2022–present); July (2004, 2006)
- Locations: Buena Vista Aquatic Recreation Area, California Central Valley (2019, 2022–); California Central Coast (2014–2018); Southern California (2000-2013)
- Years active: 2004–2019, 2022–present
- Founders: The Do LaB - Dream Rockwell, Josh Flemming, Jesse Flemming
- Website: libfestival.org

Lightning in a Bottle (LIB) is an annual 5-day music festival in the Central Valley region of California. It was first held in 2004. It is presented by The Do LaB, which seeks to promote sustainability, social cohesion, and creative expression. The festival features music performances, guest speakers, visual and interactive art installations, yoga classes, group meditation, blacksmith workshop, cooking, and other attractions.

== History ==
In 2004, the event's co-founders and producers, Dream Rockwell, Josh Flemming and Jesse Flemming, who call themselves The Do LaB, hosted Lightning in a Bottle at Gold Creek Ranch in the Angeles National Forest to 800 participants. After a one-year hiatus, the 3 day festival moved to Live Oak Camp in Santa Barbara from 2006 to 2008 where the festival outgrew the land at 5000 attendees. The Do LaB relocated Lightning in a Bottle to accommodate the increasing attendance. Another one-year hiatus passed in 2009, and in 2010 the festival was held at Oak Canyon Ranch in Silverado and by 2012, the festival had grown to 15,000 attendees. In 2013, the event was moved to Lake Skinner in Winchester, and the 2014 festival was at San Antonio Reservoir Recreation Area in Bradley. In 2015 and 2016, the festival returned to San Antonio Reservoir Recreation Area in Bradley, California seeing 34,000 participants through the gates. In 2019 the Kern County Board of Supervisors unanimously approved the Lightning in a Bottle music festival moving to the Buena Vista Aquatic Recreation Area. The festival did not take place in 2020 or 2021 due to the COVID-19 pandemic. Lightning in a Bottle restarted in 2022, staying at the Buena Vista Aquatic Recreation Area and has continued until now. Each year attendance has grown, in 2025 festival attendance reached around 26,000 people and in 2026, 30,000 people attended.

== Mission and Philosophy ==
Lightning in a Bottle was designed not only as a music festival, but to encourage to community building, creativity, self-expression, and sustainability. The organizers goal for the event is not meant for passive attendance, but rather active participation through art installations, workshops, and movement based activities. The festival's guiding principles are honoring the land, celebrating life, creating community, and active participation. They achieve this through having local Indigenous representatives, cultural advisors, wellness classes, meditation, lectures, and skill based learning activities. Sustainability is also a key feature in which Lightning in a Bottle implements waste reduction systems, composting programs and promoting awareness of sustainability.

== Awards ==
Lightning in a Bottle has won the "Outstanding Award" from A Greener Festival annually between 2011 and 2014.

In 2017, Lightning in a Bottle was nominated for Festival of the Year at the Electronic Music Awards.

In 2024, Lightning in a Bottle was voted runner-up for Best Music Festival by USA Today.

== Lightning in a Bottle Stages ==
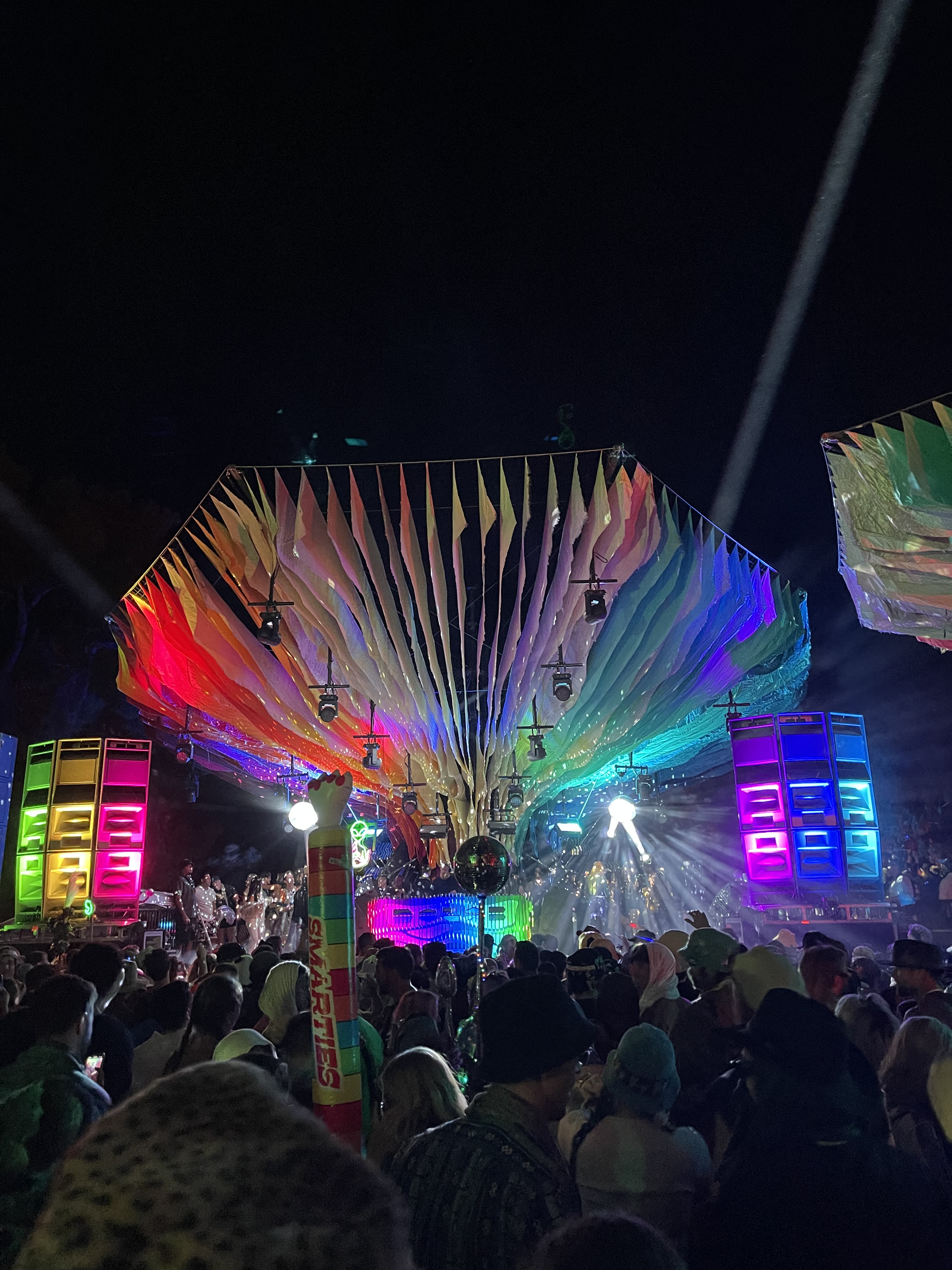
Tinlicker at the Woogie Stage (2025)

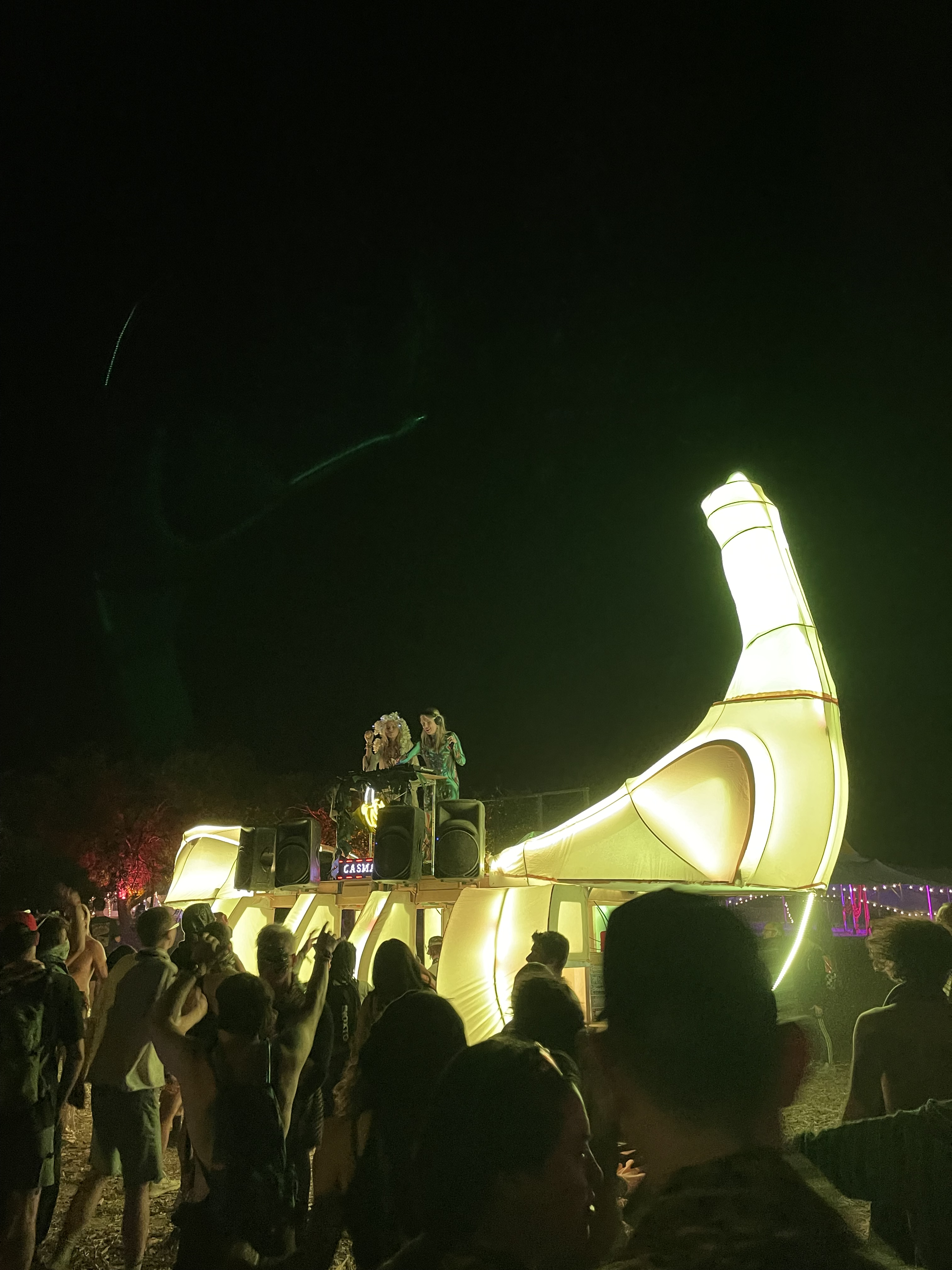
Banana Stage at Lighting in a Bottle (2025)

There are 7 stages at Lightning in a Bottle.

1. Lightning
2. Thunder
3. Woogie
4. Grand Artique
5. Junkyard
6. Stacks
7. Crossroads

The main stage of Lightning in a Bottle is the Lightning stage which holds all of the headliners' performances. There are also many other smaller movable stages located all over the festival grounds where local artists perform atop Art Cars, which are decorated as objects such as bananas, catarpillars, and monsters.

== Notable Artists ==
Some of the most recent notable artists who have performed include Skrillex (2024), James Blake (2024), Rufus du Sol (2024), Khruangbin (2025) Jamie xx (2025), Four Tet (2025), and John Summit (2025). All of these artists range from around 3-20 million monthly listeners on Spotify. Coming in 2026, Empire of the Sun, Mau P, and Sara Landry will perform at Lightning in a Bottle.

== See also ==
- List of electronic music festivals
- Burning Man
- Counterculture
- Lucent Dossier Experience
- Lucidity (festival)
- Dream Rockwell
- Coachella
- Silverado Canyon (Orange County)
- Woogie Weekend
