= Lucidity (festival) =

Festival in Santa Barbara, California

- Status: Active
- Genre: Electronic dance music, devotional music, experimental music, folk music
- Frequency: Annually
- Venue: Live Oak Campground
- Location: Santa Barbara, California
- Years active: 2012–2019, 2022–2023
- Inaugurated: April 13–15, 2012
- Founders: Lucidity Festivals, LLC
- Most recent: April 6–8, 2018
- Website: lucidityfestival.com

Lucidity was an annual, three-day transformational festival in Santa Barbara, California, which took place from 2012 until 2023. The planned 2024 event was cancelled.

== History ==
Live Oak Campground had been the site of several other music festivals, such as Lightning in a Bottle (2006 to 2008).

Lucidity went on hiatus for 2020 and 2021 during the COVID-19 pandemic, although virtual festivals were held. It returned in person in 2022.

In September 2024, the 12th year of the event, the Lucidity Festival organizers announced that the festival had to be canceled, citing "unforeseen last-minute changes in requirements" imposed by Santa Barbara County. They subsequently stated that they could not financially recover from the "postponement", and said there would be no refunds for already-purchased passes. They added that unless a location to host the event could be secured by April 2025, the festival would declare bankruptcy and end permanently.

== Character ==
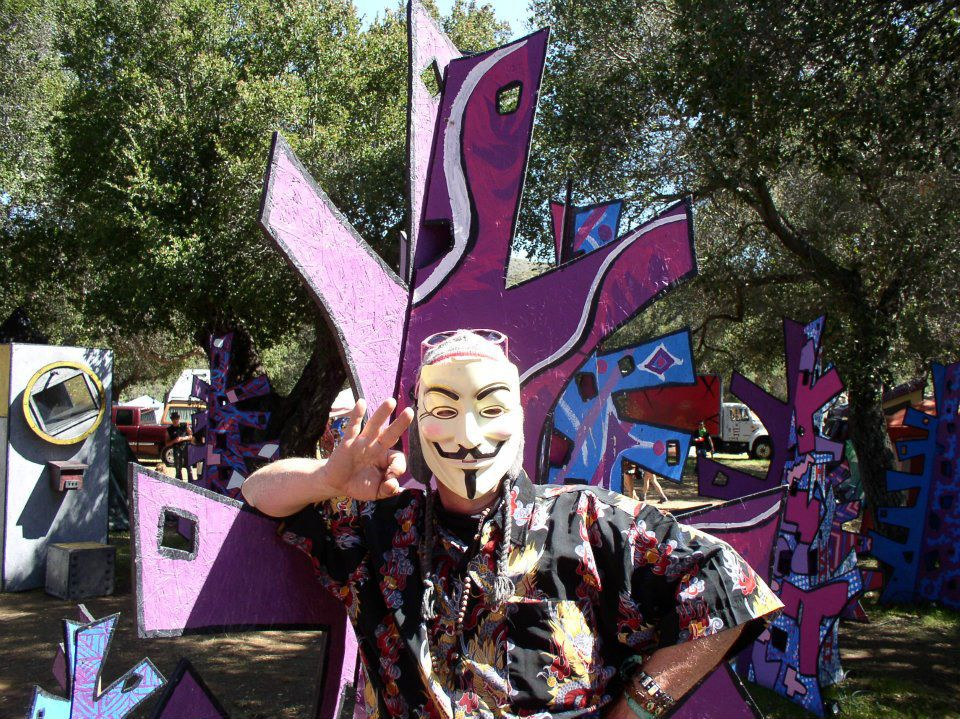

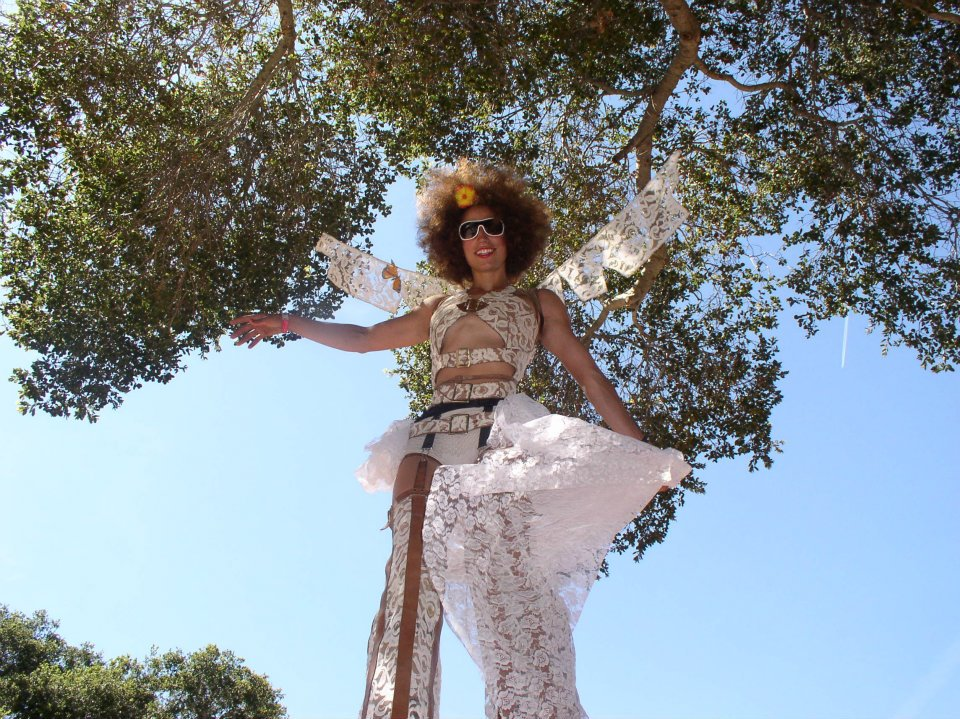

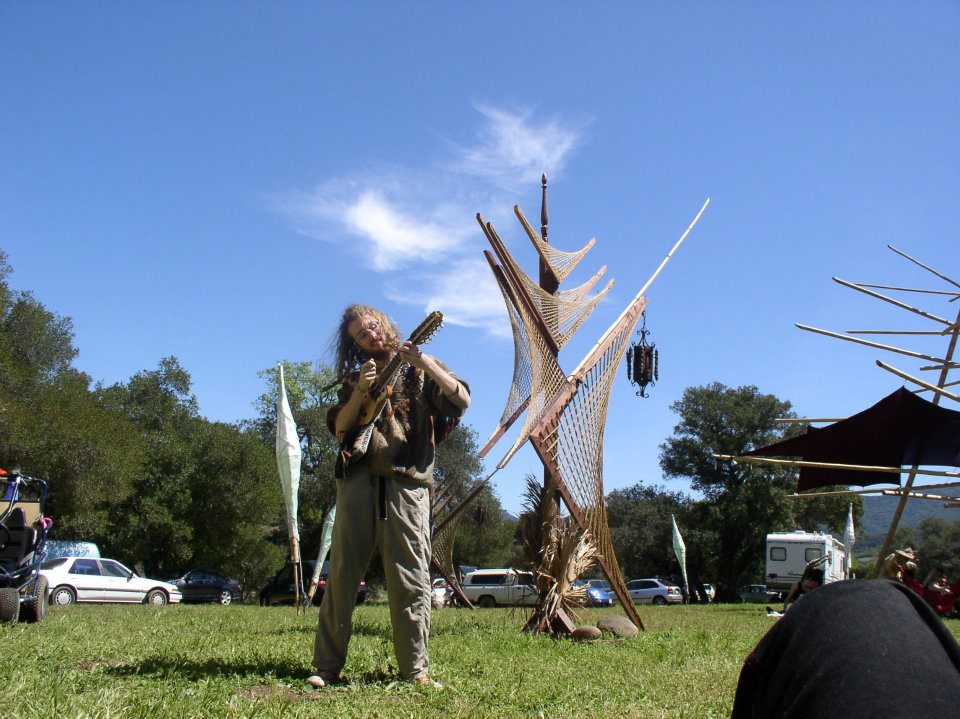
Musicians intermingled with sculptured art installations.

The festival's name alludes to lucid dreams; the event's producers encourage attendees to "awake in [their] dreams". According to Daphne Carpenter, the festival was organized around "six themed villages that revolve around archetypes much in the same way as our dream characters represent aspects of ourselves". She lists these as Renegade Outpost, Family Garden, Healing Sanctuary, Warrior's Way, Lunatic Fringe, and Lover's Nest.

The event has been compared to Burning Man, Coachella Valley Music and Arts Festival, Lightning in a Bottle, Electric Daisy Carnival, and the San Francisco New Year's Eve event Sea of Dreams.

Much of the ethic of the event was rooted in the general philosophy of "burners". The event sponsored a "Greenest Campsite" contest and a motto of "Leave It Better". There were copious reminders to pick up trash and constant activity to remove trash and keep the grounds looking well.

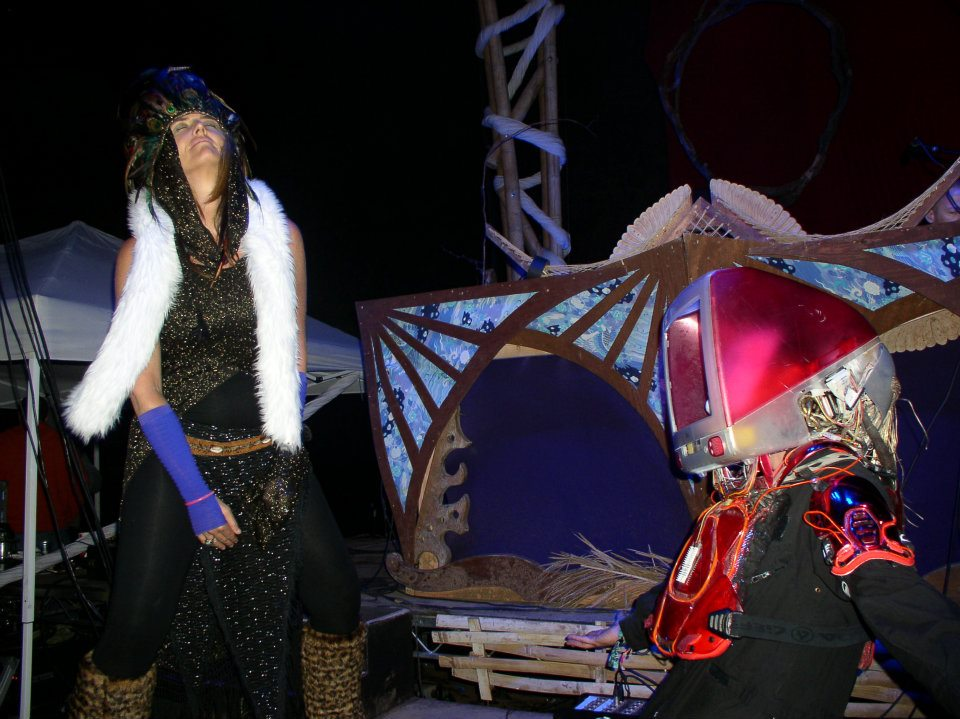
Phuture Primitive

== See also ==
- List of electronic music festivals
