= Biohacking =

Biohacking, biohacker, or biohack may refer to:

- Biohackers, 2020 German techno-thriller streaming television series

== Science and medicine ==
- Body hacking, the application of the hacker ethic to improve one's own body
- CRISPR gene editing, genetic engineering technique in molecular biology by which the genomes of living organisms may be modified
- Do-it-yourself biology, movement in which individuals and small organizations study biology
- Gene knockout, genetic engineering technique that involves the targeted removal or inactivation of a specific gene within an organism's genome
- Quantified self, measuring various biomarkers and behaviors to try to optimize health
- Performance psychology, improving one's mental and behavioural capabilities to boost performance
- Synthetic biology, field of science that involves redesigning organisms for useful purposes by engineering them to have new abilities

== See also ==
- Nootropic, drugs, supplements, and other substances to improve cognitive function in healthy individuals
- Nutrigenomics, study of the relationship between human genome, nutrition and health
- Self-experimentation in medicine, scientific experimentation in which the experimenter performs the experiment on themselves
