= Lake Webb (California) =

Manmade lake of California, US

- Location within California Location within the United States
- Location: Kern County, California
- Coordinates: 35°13′25″N 119°15′46″W
- Type: Artificial
- Primary inflows: Kern River
- Built: 1973
- Surface area: 998 acres (404 ha)
- Settlements: Bakersfield, California
- References: County of Kern Parks & Recreation

Lake Webb is a manmade recreational lake in Kern County, California. It is primarily a motorboat, jet skiing, and waterskiing lake. It is one of two lakes that are part of the Buena Vista Aquatic Recreation Area southwest of Bakersfield. The lake is located on the lakebed of the former Buena Vista Lake.

== See also ==
- Lake Evans
- List of lakes in California
