= California Central Valley grasslands =

Temperate grasslands, savannas, and shrublands ecoregion in California, United States

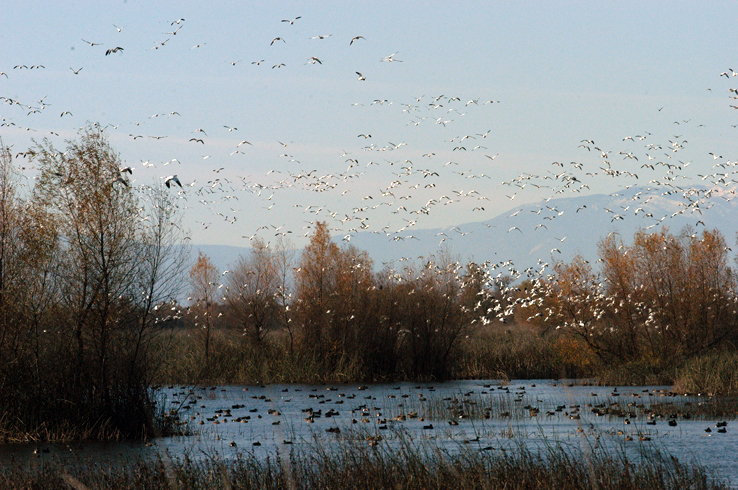
- Waterfowl in the Central Valley wetlands

- Location of the California Central Valley grasslands

Ecology
- Realm: Nearctic
- Biome: temperate grasslands, savannas, and shrublands
- Borders: California interior chaparral and woodlands
- Bird species: 184
- Mammal species: 79

Geography
- Area: 46,275 km^{2} (17,867 mi^{2})
- Country: United States
- State: California
- Coordinates: 37°N 120.3°W
- Climate type: Mediterranean (Csa)

Conservation
- Conservation status: Critical/endangered
- Protected: 1,935 km^{2} (4%)

The California Central Valley grasslands is a temperate grasslands, savannas, and shrublands ecoregion in California's Central Valley. It a diverse ecoregion containing areas of desert grassland (at the southern end), prairie, savanna, riparian forest, marsh, several types of seasonal vernal pools, and large lakes such as now-dry Tulare Lake (which was the largest freshwater lake in the United States west of the Mississippi), Buena Vista Lake, and Kern Lake.

The Central Valley has been greatly altered by human activity. Most of the land has been converted to farms, pastureland, or cities. Most of the valley's wetlands have been drained. The introduction of exotic plants, especially grasses, has altered the region's ecology.

== Geography ==
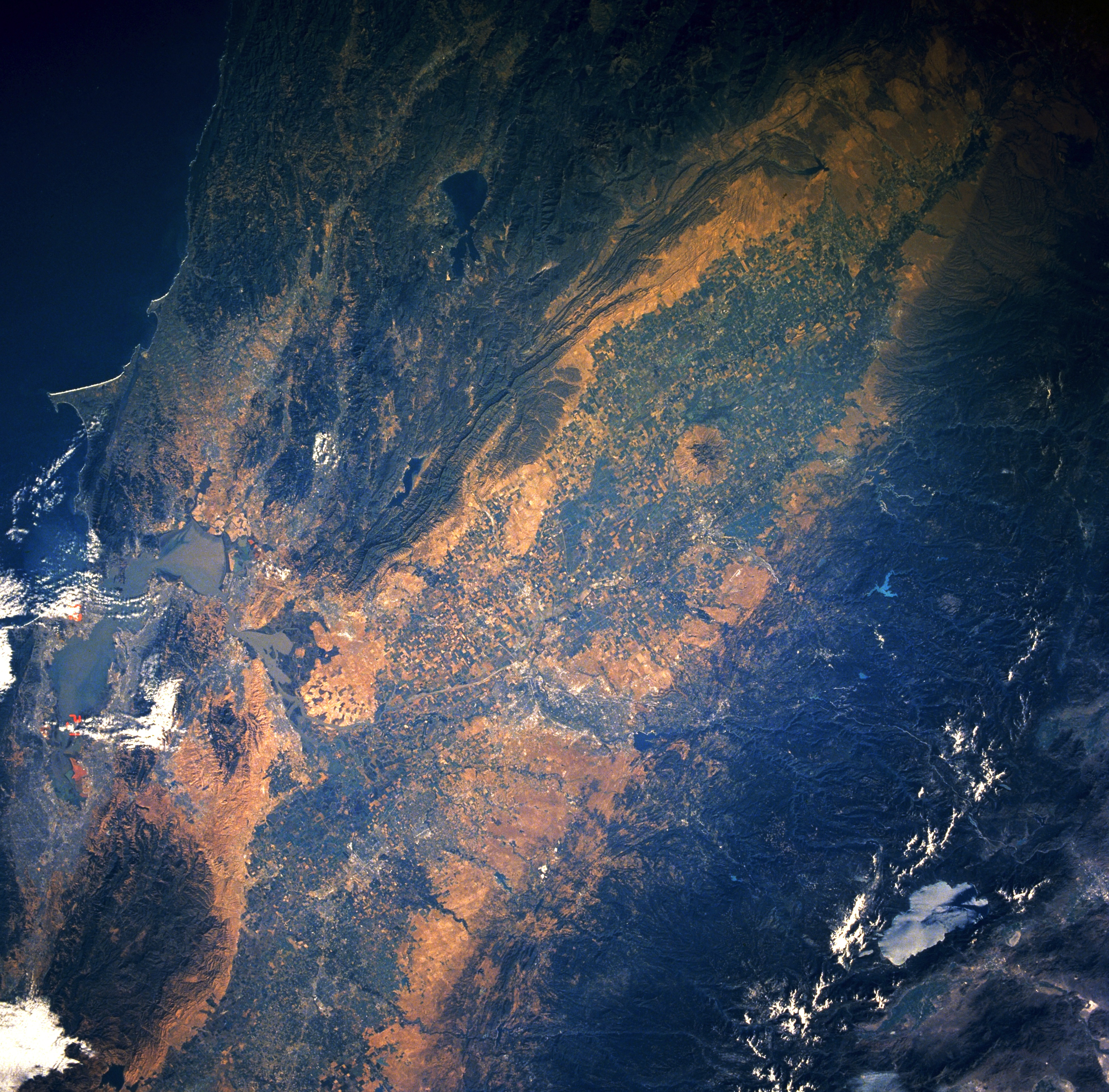
Central Valley seen from space.

The ecoregion covers an area of 46,275 km^{2}. It extends north–south through California's Central Valley. The valley is ringed with mountains – the Sierra Nevada to the east, and the Coast Ranges to the west.

The grasslands ecoregion occupies the valley floor, which is mostly flat or gently rolling. The oak woodlands and chaparral that fringe the valley constitute the California interior chaparral and woodlands ecoregion.

The northern portion of the valley, known as the Sacramento Valley, is drained by the Sacramento River and its tributaries. The San Joaquin River and its tributaries drain most of the southern portion of the valley, which is known as the San Joaquin Valley. The Sacramento and San Joaquin rivers flow into a large inland delta before they empty westwards into the Pacific Ocean via San Francisco Bay, which occupies a gap in the Coast Ranges.

The volume of water carried by the rivers varies seasonally, increasing with winter rains and spring snowmelt from the Sierra Nevada, and decreasing during the drier summer and fall months. The rivers used to form broad seasonal wetlands, which would flood in the winter and spring and dry out in the summer and fall. Smaller vernal pools form in poorly-drained areas during the wet season. The annual precipitation also recharged a large freshwater aquifer under the valley.

Upstream dams now regulate the annual water flows on many of the valley's rivers, impounding spring runoff to use for summer irrigation. Many of the seasonal wetlands, including most of the former delta wetlands, have been drained for agriculture, and the rivers contained in levees. The aquifer underlying the valley is also heavily tapped for irrigation and urban water, and in the past century the water table has dropped enormously across much of the valley.

The southernmost portion of the valley is a closed basin which emptied into Tulare Lake, Buena Vista Lake, and Kern Lake. These lakes and the surrounding seasonal wetlands have now mostly been drained and converted to cropland.

== Climate ==
The ecoregion has a temperate Mediterranean climate, with most of the annual rainfall occurring during the winter months. Rainfall generally decreases from north to south. The western side of the valley, which is in the rain shadow of the Coast Ranges, is generally drier than the eastern side.

== Flora ==
The dominant grasses in the moister areas of the valley were perennial bunch grasses, including Nassella pulchra mixed with other species. In the more extensive arid central regions this was probably not the case. Native species were adapted to cool-season growth during the wet winter months. Introduced annual grasses, which germinate at the onset of the rainy season and set seed then die during the summer drought, now dominate most valley grasslands. Grassland wildflowers include California poppy (Eschscholzia californica), lupines, and purple owl's clover (Castilleja exserta), which can still be seen, especially in the Tehachapi Mountains and Antelope Valley south of the valley, and the Carrizo Plain southwest of the valley, where they create colorful springtime blooms.

Riverside trees include willows, western sycamore (Platanus racemosa), box elder (Acer negundo), Fremont cottonwood (Populus fremontii), and valley oak (Quercus lobata).

== Fauna ==
The Central Valley was once home to large populations of pronghorn antelope (Antilocapra americana), elk including the endemic tule elk subspecies (Cervus elaphus nannodes), mule deer (Odocoileus hemionus), California ground squirrels, gophers, mice, hare, rabbits and kangaroo rats. Several species or subspecies of rodents are endemic or near-endemic to the southern valley habitats, including the Fresno kangaroo rat (Dipodomys nitratoides exilis), Tipton kangaroo rat (Dipodomys nitratoides nitratoides), San Joaquin pocket mouse (Perognathus inornatus), and giant kangaroo rat (Dipodomys ingens). The San Joaquin kit fox (Vulpes macrotis mutica) is an endangered subspecies surviving on the hillsides of the San Joaquin Valley.

The wetlands of the Valley were an important habitat for wintering waterbirds and migrating birds along the Pacific flyway. Three birds are nearly endemic to the ecoregion – the yellow-billed magpie (Pica nuttalli), tricolored blackbird (Agelaius tricolor), and Nuttall's woodpecker (Picoides nuttalii).

Reptiles and amphibians of the valley include the endemic San Joaquin coachwhip snake (Masticophis flagellum ruddocki), blunt-nosed leopard lizard (Gambelia sila), Gilbert's skink (Eumeces gilberti) and the western aquatic garter snake (Thamnophis couchii). There are also a number of endemic invertebrates.

The Central Valley is also home to a wide variety of endemic fish species, including the Sacramento pikeminnow, Sacramento perch, Sacramento blackfish, and Sacramento splittail, among others.

== Protected areas ==
1,935 km^{2}, or 4%, of the ecoregion is in protected areas. 3% of the area outside protected areas remains in grassland or other undeveloped habitat. Most of the protected and undeveloped area is dominated by introduced species, with smaller areas of relatively intact habitat.

The Great Valley Grasslands State Park preserves an example of the habitat in the valley, while oak savanna habitats remain near Visalia. There are areas of wetland and riverside woodland in the north especially on the Sacramento River system including the Nature Conservancy's Cosumnes River Preserve just south of Sacramento, Gray Lodge Wildlife Area, Butte Sink Wildlife Management Area, and other patches in the delta area. Remaining vernal pools include Pixley National Wildlife Refuge between Tulare, and Bakersfield and Jepson Prairie Preserve in the delta. There are large blocks of desert scrubland in the southern San Joaquin Valley and in the Carrizo Plain, a basin lying southwest of the Central Valley in the Coast Ranges which has a similar climate and landscape.
