= Yoimut =

Last of the Native American Chunut people

- Born: Yoimut; 1855; Near Visalia, California
- Died: 1937 (aged 81–82); Hanford, California
- Other names: Yo'yomat; Josie Alonzo

Yoimut or Yo'yomat (c. 1856 – 1937), also known as Josie Alonzo, (Note: Her adopted colonization name.) was a Yokuts woman who was the last speaker of the Chunut language of central California. She has also been recorded as the last "full-blooded" Chunut. She was a noted polyglot, speaking 8 different Yokutsan languages along with English and Spanish. She was among the last indigenous inhabitants of Tulare Lake, before being forcibly removed by Anglo-American settlers. She was an informant to anthropologists Frank F. Latta and A. H. Gayton.

== Biography ==
=== Early life ===
Before Yoimut was born, her parents lived at the Chunut village of Heuumne four miles (6.4 km) south of Waukena. Her father was named Po-kah-sah and her mother was Te-ta-we-cot. Te-ta-we-cot was born at the Wowol village of Chawlowin on Atwell Island, one of several islands on the lake. Te-ta-we-cot had a son named Wehpes (also known as Bill Foster.) Yoimut's maternal grandfather was head of the Wowol nation, who was succeeded by his oldest brother Teh-nih-pahs, who died at Sulawlahne, four miles south of Farmersville, California.

=== Circumstances of birth ===
In 1854, soldiers forcibly removed Yoimut's parents with all the other Lake Indians to the Fresno River Reservation. After two or three months, they were removed again to Fort Tejon. One night, Po-kah-sah and Te-ta-we-cot escaped and hid along the foothills until they met the Kaweah River, then they went to the Telumne village of Watot Shulul, northwest of the 'old sugar factory about a mile south-east of Visalia'. Only a couple of days after arriving, Yoimut was born.

=== Plague and father's death ===
When Yoimut was 6, a plague struck Watot Shulul, causing it to be abandoned. She reports this was measles and the incident happened right after the flood of 1862. This had a devastating effect on the Telumne as the Yokuts were already heavily depopulated from the Pestilence of 1833. Her people went to the 'old village' south of Farmersville. After two weeks, her father Po-kah-sah died and was buried here.

=== Ghost dance in Eshom Valley ===
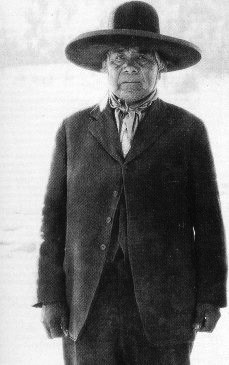
Wovoka, Northern Paiute spiritual leader and creator of the Ghost Dance

When Yoimut was 17, Paiute Indians from Nevada came and organized a Ghost Dance in Eshom Valley. When the dance was nearly finished Pleas Work and his brother Mitch came and told the dancers that white people were coming to kill them all. They evacuated the valley without clothes or food. They hid in a canyon on near the Kings River. After a week of hiding, "some white people" assured the natives they would not be hurt. They never finished the Eshom Valley dance but did another dance at Sulawlahne, for six days and six nights. Yoimut said after this they were sure 'the Indians from across the mountains were fooling us'.

=== Return to Tulare Lake ===
When Yoimut was ten her mother took her to camp at a place four or five miles south of Buzzard's Roost, or three miles from Waukena. This site had many ruined dirt houses, the last remnants of indigenous habitation. When Yoimut was ten her mother remarried after her father's death, during the time 'the white people were having a big war between themselves' (the Civil War). During this time they moved to Armona where they lived for about one month. During this time, some natives told Yoimut's father that some Wowol were once again living on Atwell Island. Then they drove to a village called either Heeumne or Chuntow, near the school house in Artesia, an unincorporated community in Tulare County. After three months at this camp, a man named Pat Murray threatened to kill them all if they did not leave. At first they considered going to Tejon Ranch. They decided to, instead, make their way to Chawlowin. Chawlowin was a Wowol village on an island in Tulare Lake, which would eventually become the site of Alpaugh, California.

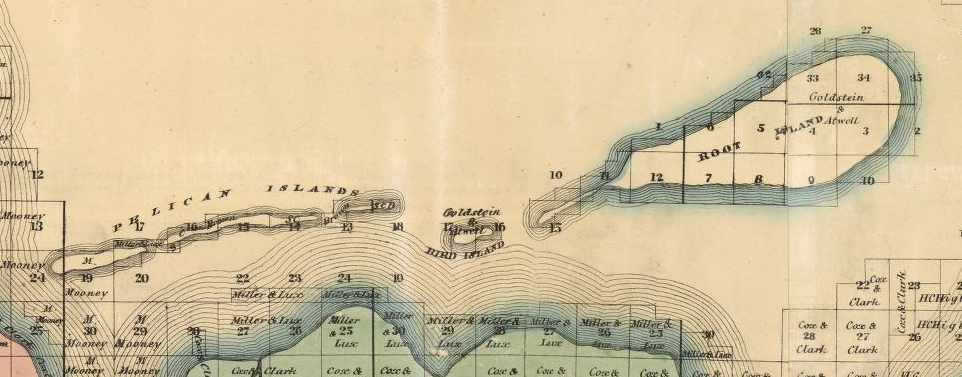
An 1876 map of Tulare County. Chawlowin was located on Root Island.

Here, Yoimut's mother met many members of her family, including her brother and two or three of her uncles. They were refugees from the Tule River Reservation. After living at the "Fish" Rice ranch, Yoimut's family wanted to return to Tulare Lake. They went to visit several times but never again lived on the lake.

=== After Tulare Lake ===
"All of my life I want back our good home on Tulare Lake. But I guess I can never have it. I am a very old Chunut now and I guess I can never see the old days."

In late November 1930, the anthropologist Frank F. Latta interviewed Yoimut. She told him she was the last survivor of her band.

Yoimut was an important anthropological informant.

=== Death ===
Yoimut died in Hanford, California, in 1937.

== Similar cases ==
- Marie Wilcox, last speaker of Wukchumni, a similar dialect of the Yokuts language
- Ishi, a California native, the last Yahi and the last speaker of the Yahi language, a dialect of Yana. He may have been the last speaker of Yana as a whole.

== See also ==
- Islands in Tulare Lake
