= Connecting Slough =

Former slough in California, US

Connecting Slough, the former slough between Kern Lake and Buena Vista Lake in the southeastern San Joaquin Valley, in Kern County, California.

It was part of the Tulare Lake Basin and Kern River system, before agricultural diversions by the Central Valley Project. It was a tributary of the San Joaquin River until the latter 19th century.
