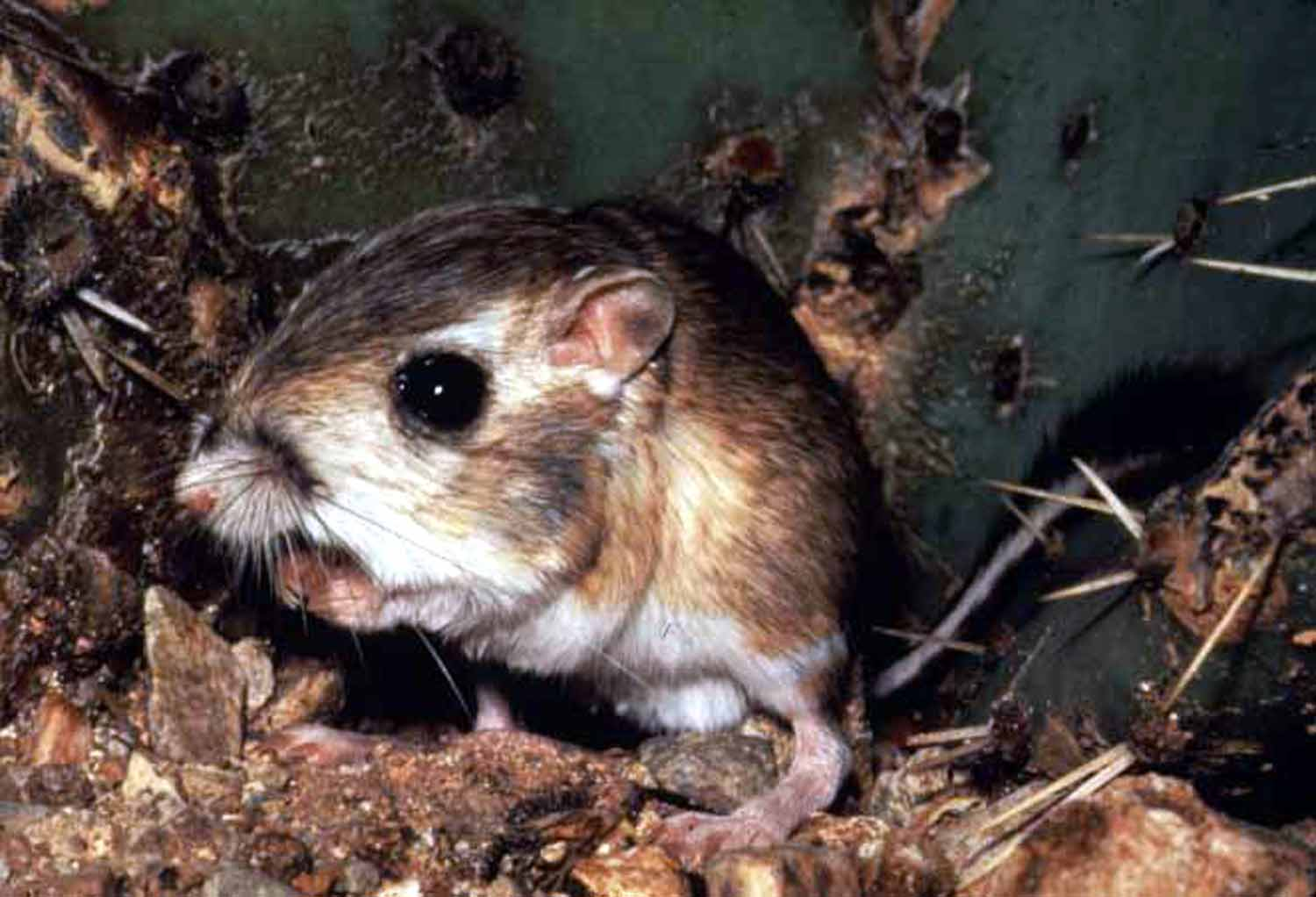

Conservation status
- Vulnerable (IUCN 3.1)

Scientific classification
- Kingdom: Animalia
- Phylum: Chordata
- Class: Mammalia
- Infraclass: Placentalia
- Order: Rodentia
- Family: Heteromyidae
- Genus: Dipodomys
- Species: D. nitratoides

Binomial name
- Dipodomys nitratoides Merriam, 1894
- IUCN Red List range map for Dipodomys nitratoides, Version 2021-2

= Fresno kangaroo rat =

Species of rodent

The Fresno kangaroo rat or San Joaquin kangaroo rat (Dipodomys nitratoides) is a species of rodent in the family Heteromyidae. It is endemic to areas within and near the San Joaquin Valley of California in the United States. Habitat destruction due to agricultural development and urbanization has put this species at risk, and the International Union for Conservation of Nature has assessed its conservation status as "vulnerable".

There are three subspecies of D. nitratoides:

- D. n. exilis (Merriam, 1894) (Fresno subspecies),
- D. n. nitratoides (Merriam, 1894) (Tipton subspecies),
- D. n. brevinasus (Grinnell, 1920) (short-nose subspecies).

== Description ==
The Fresno kangaroo rat is the smallest of the kangaroo rats in its genus, and has a head-and body length of about 10 cm (4 in). Like other members of the genus, its tail, which is tipped with a large tuft of fur, is longer than the head and body combined. Kangaroo rats do not run, but use their powerful hind limbs to jump as in the manner of a kangaroo, using their tails for balance as they proceed in bounds. The small front legs are used for manipulating food. The fur of the upper parts of this species is yellowish, and that of the underparts is white.

== Distribution and habitat ==
This kangaroo rat is found in and around the San Joaquin Valley in California, in the United States. The subspecies D. n. exilis and D. n. nitratoides are found only in the valley bottom. Historically, D. n. exilis occupied alkaline grassland and saltbush scrub between Merced River to the north and Kings River to the south, and between Fresno Slough to the west and Fresno to the east. This area of occupancy has shrunk and now covers an area of about 160 hectares (400 acres) in Fresno County to the west of Kerman. Similarly, the range of D. n. nitratoides has shrunk from most of the Tulare Basin to some fragmentary patches surrounded by cultivated land in northern Kings County and southern Kern County, to the east of the dried up Tulare Lake. The subspecies with the most extensive range is D. n. brevinasus; this inhabits grasslands and shrublands on the foothill slopes to the west of the San Joachim Valley, from Merced County in the north to San Emigdio Creek in the south, and the foothills to the east of the San Joachim Valley near the dried up Buena Vista Lake.

== Ecology ==
The species is nocturnal and shows maximum activity levels shortly after sunset. It is three times less active on nights with a moon than on moonless nights; it is more active in the open on nights without a moon, while keeping in the shade of vegetation when the moon is shining. It feeds largely on seeds, which it stuffs into its cheek pouches for transporting back to the burrow to eat or to cache. It chooses friable soil for the digging of the burrow. Breeding may take place three times a year, with litters of up to five young, and the gestation period is about one month.

== Status ==
The Fresno kangaroo rat is limited to a range of about 20,000 square kilometres (7,700 sq mi), a much smaller area than it used at one time to occupy. Much of its traditional range has been converted for agricultural use, some has been used for infrastructure projects and some for urban development. It does not adapt well to cultivated fields, though it may re-invade them if they are abandoned. It is rather patchy in occurrence, with large swings in its total population, due to flooding, drought or other occurrences. This may lead to local extirpation, and with the fragmentation of its range, populations do not easily recover. For these reasons, the International Union for Conservation of Nature has assessed its conservation status as "vulnerable". The subspecies most at risk is D. n. exilis which now has a total area of occupancy of only 160 hectares (400 acres). Some populations of D. n. nitratoides have fewer than 50 individuals and occupy such restricted habitats as the central strip of highways.
