= Buena Vista Slough =

Slough in California, United States

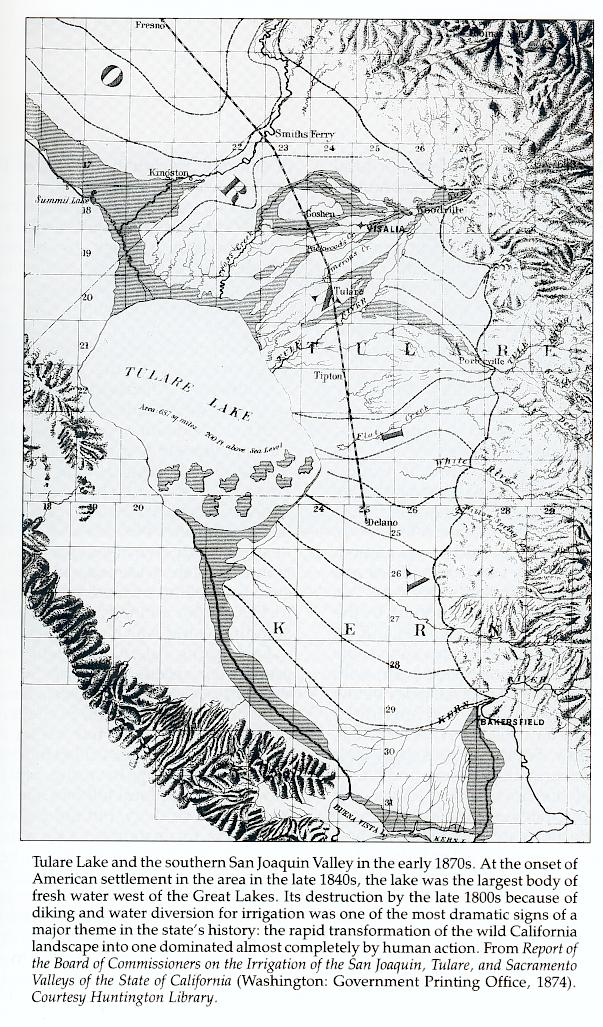
Buena Vista Slough 1874

Buena Vista Slough was the joint outlet of an overflowing Buena Vista Lake and a distributary of the Kern River into Tulare Lake. It is now diverted into a system of canals by the Outlet Canal of the Central Valley Project.

== History ==
In times when Buena Vista Lake overflowed it first backed up into Kern Lake making one large lake. When this larger lake overflowed it flowed out through the Buena Vista Slough that began southeast of what is now Tupman where it met the Kern River distributary channel to the San Joaquin River.35°16′10″N 119°18′34″W It then ran northwest from there through tule marshland and Goose Lake, into Tulare Lake west of the Sand Ridge.35°49′30″N 119°43′59″W During the late 19th century a system of canals was built to divert this water for agriculture. That diversion of water lead to a lawsuit by downstream property owners in Lux v. Haggin.
