= Witt Site =

Archaeological site in California, United States

- U.S. National Register of Historic Places
- Nearest city: Kettleman City, California
- Area: 10 acres (4.0 ha)
- NRHP reference No.: 71000141
- Added to NRHP: May 6, 1971

The Witt Site is an archaeological site near Tulare Lake in Kings County, California. It was found by Donald Witt, who collected artifacts of concave points, crescents, and fossilized elephant, bison, and horse bones. The site was apparently a good location for ambushing large mammals coming to the lake.

Included in artifacts obtained from the Witt Site in private collections were fluted "Clovis culture-like" points, stemmed points, and crescents believed to reflect Paleoindian occupations. Subsequently, the Witt Site was seen as being one of three major Clovis localities known in California. Since the late 1980s, other private collections from the site have been described and some limited excavations have been conducted. According to a 2019 article published in the journal PaleoAmerica, analysis of the fluted points now suggest that any Clovis presence was probably less than believed and that most of the early material from the Witt Site indicates an occupation by Western Stemmed Tradition groups.

The location address of the Witt Site is restricted.

A 10-acre (4.0 ha) area at the site was listed on the National Register of Historic Places in 1971.
