= West Isle Line, Inc. =

Private railroad and subsidiary of Nutrien

West Isle Line
Overview
- Headquarters: Alpaugh, California
- Reporting mark: WFS
- Locale: San Joaquin Valley (Tulare County), California
- Dates of operation: January 7, 1998–present

Technical
- Track gauge: 4 ft 8 1/2 in (1,435 mm) standard gauge

The West Isle Line (reporting mark WFS) is a private railroad and is a wholly owned subsidiary of Nutrien (formerly Western Farm Service). The line is operated by a contractor and the line does not have any employees. The line began service on January 7, 1998, after having been acquired from the Burlington Northern & Santa Fe Railway. The line runs for 5.25 miles from Alpaugh, California, to a connection with the BNSF Railway at Stoil (milepost 936 on BNSF's Bakersfield Subdivision). Western Farm Service is the only customer on the line.

Western Farm Service bought the line from the BNSF in order to avoid having the BNSF's "Alpaugh Branch" abandoned. The line was formerly part of the Atchison, Topeka and Santa Fe Railway and was constructed by the ATSF in 1914.

The railroad, as of 2001, averages 400 carloads per year, primarily chemicals used for fertilizer.

== Motive power ==
The West Isle Line has one EMD GP9 (serial number 21332) that was manufactured in February 1956 for Southern Pacific Railroad. It is marked in a green paint scheme with yellow marking as "West Isle Line" engine number "3399". It was formerly known as SP 3399, 3472, and 5639.

== See also ==
- List of California railroads
