= Leslie Spier =

American anthropologist (1893–1961)

Leslie Spier (December 13, 1893 – December 3, 1961) was an American anthropologist best known for his ethnographic studies of American Indians. He spent a great deal of his professional life as a teacher.

Spier created a path for the study of cultural change, taking the time to conduct in-depth studies of group contact. His studies focused on changes throughout various cultures over time; he saw great importance in empirical research and made his reports as detailed as possible. Spier’s early years were spent studying the many diverse areas of anthropology ranging from archaeology to physical anthropology. His main interests were studying human relations and analyzing cultural processes among Native American groups. As a teacher, Spier was greatly admired by his students because he was extremely successful in passing along his methodological techniques for gathering exact data. Spier is remembered best for his explanatory studies and widespread fieldwork of cultural groups. Spier continued his research using his personal methodology right to his death in 1961.

== Background ==
Leslie Spier was born in New York City, New York, on December 13, 1893. He was one of four children born to Simon P. Spier and Bertha Adler Spier. During his childhood and teenage years, he received his education through the New York public school system. As an undergraduate, he attended the College of the City of New York, graduating in 1915 with a Bachelor of Science degree in engineering. Despite earning a degree in engineering, he had developed a strong interest in anthropology and was accepted into graduate school at Columbia University; he graduated with a doctorate in anthropology in 1920. His years at Columbia would prove be extremely fulfilling, allowing him to study under the famous anthropologist Franz Boas. Boas was a strong influence on Spier; the techniques and methods he learned guided Spier’s anthropological work throughout his entire career.

In 1920, Spier married Erna Gunther, a fellow anthropology student at Columbia University. After graduating and receiving their degrees (Gunther earned a Master's degree), the newly married couple moved to the University of Washington. The couple had two children, Robert and Christopher. In 1927, Spier and Gunther separated, divorcing a few years later in 1931. In the same year following his divorce, Spier remarried; his new wife Anna H. Gayton was also anthropologist.

== Employment history ==
Spier began his career in the field of anthropology before he had acquired a college degree. In 1913, he was assigned to be an assistant anthropologist with the New Jersey Archaeological and Geological Survey. While studying at Columbia as a graduate student (1916–1920), he was employed as an assistant anthropologist at the American Museum of Natural History. After graduating with his Ph.D. in 1920, Spier began his teaching career, which he continued until his retirement in 1955. He taught at many institutions throughout his career, staying the longest at the University of Washington (1920–1929), Yale University (1933–1939), and the University of New Mexico (1939–1955). He taught at several other universities as well including the University of Oklahoma (1927–1929), the University of Chicago (1928 and 1930), and Harvard University (1939 and 1949). In addition, Spier was a visiting professor for summer courses at Columbia University (1921, 1923, 1925, and 1932), the University of California, Berkeley (1924, 1925, 1927, 1932, 1933, and 1948), and at the University of California, Los Angeles (1947).

Spier, along with Melville Jacobs, was responsible for creating the anthropology department at the University of Washington. In 1945, while at the University of New Mexico, Spier founded the Southwestern Journal of Anthropology; by this time, the university was employing six faculty members in the anthropology department. He retired in 1955

== Research ==
Early in his career, Spier was involved in many research projects in the Northeast United States including in his home state of New York, and in New Jersey and Delaware. In the time period between 1916 and 1935, Spier dedicated at least part of every year to field research. He was a research assistant at Yale University in 1932 and 1933 and at the University of California from 1960 to 1961. The greater part of Spier’s research involved detailed investigations into the life and cultures of Native American groups—Zuni, Klamath, Havasupai, Wishram, Kiowa, and various others. He was interested in analyzing the origins and distributions of these groups across North America. His research led to many important discoveries for the application of anthropology, first in archaeology and later in ethnology.

== Archaeology ==
Even though Spier’s main research focus was in ethnology, he started his career in anthropology through archaeological studies. Spier, along with other archaeologists such as Nels Nelson, Clark Wissler, and A. R. Kroeber, created new seriation-based chronologies for the American Southwest. In 1918, during his time working with the New Jersey Archaeological and Geological study, he published one of his most important works in archaeology—The Trenton Argillite Culture. From the collected data on the "argillite culture," Spier determined that this culture did not exist. He combined his knowledge of statistical analysis with the archaeological deposits, concluding that the artifacts were present due to natural geological changes in the area.

Another well known archaeological publication by Spier concerns the Zuni; in his research with Zuni groups, Spier demonstrated his use of seriation to chronologically order site deposits. In conjunction with Kidder’s seriation, Kroeber’s ranking and concurrent variation, and Nelson’s stratigraphy, Spier was helping develop fundamental methods in archaeological theory that are used to this day. Through use of these procedures, Spier was able to determine that the Zuni culture was a continuation of the earliest cultures of the same area.

== Ethnology ==
Spier’s main anthropological interest was ethnographic studies, especially of American Indians. His favorite ethnological courses to teach were those concentrated on the Southwest, the Great Basin, the Plains, and California. Spier’s previous anthropological experience made him well-suited for ethnographic studies; he completely immersed himself in the culture he was studying, acquiring the language, learning cultural customs, and bringing a new awareness to an otherwise unknown group of people. He conducted many ethnographic studies among Native American populations; for Spier, it was crucial to gain knowledge and evidence about these cultures before they became extinct. From the 1910s to the 1930s, he studied Zuni, Havasupai, Kiowa, Wichita, Wishram, Klamath, and numerous other groups. Spier’s personal interest in gathering firsthand knowledge of American Indian cultures shaped his place in the ethnographic world. His interest in Native American cultures led him all across the United States, but a majority of his research is based in the western areas of the country from California to the Great Basin, and everywhere in between. Spier studied extensively on the complex ceremonial sun dance performed by the Plains Indians. He looked closely into the lifestyles of the native cultures, taking detailed inventory of housing, clothing, economy, etc., and created a detailed account of how the cultural system worked and prospered. Spier’s ethnographic studies went far beyond descriptions; he frequently compared the cultural systems over a surrounding area in order to gain a deeper understanding of the people he was studying.

== Awards and honors ==
In 1919, Columbia University awarded Spier the Cutting Travelling Fellowship; in 1923, Spier was awarded a National Research Council Fellowship. Spier was presented with the Townsend Harris Medal in 1946 and the Viking Fund Medal and Award in 1960. Throughout his career, Spier was affiliated with many professional and honorary societies. He was president of the American Anthropological Association in 1943, American Anthropologist editor from 1934 to 1938, and vice-president of the American Association for the Advancement of Science in 1943 and 1946. He first became a member of the National Academy of Sciences in 1946; in the same year, he became part of the American Philosophical Society. In 1960, he became an Honorary Fellow of the Royal Anthropological Institute of Great Britain and Ireland. He was also recognized as a member of the Andean Institute, the Society for American Folklore, and Sigma Xi.

== Selected works ==
- Spier, Leslie. An Outline for a Chronology of Zuni Ruins. New York City: The Trustees of Columbia University, 1917.
- Spier, Leslie. The Trenton Argillite Culture. New York City: The Trustees of Columbia University, 1918.
- Spier, Leslie. Ruins in the White Mountains, Arizona. New York City: The Trustees of Columbia University, 1919.
- Spier, Leslie. Notes on the Kiowa Sun Dance. New York City: The Trustees of Columbia University, 1921.
- Spier, Leslie. The Sun Dance of the Plains Indians: Its Development and Diffusion. New York City: The Trustees of Columbia University, 1921.
- Spier, Leslie. The Distribution of Kinship Systems in North America''. Seattle: University of Washington Press, 1925.
- Spier, Leslie. The Ghost Dance of 1870 Among the Klamath of Oregon. Seattle: University of Washington Press, 1927
- Spier, Leslie. Havasupai Ethnography. New York City: The Trustees of Columbia University, 1928.
- Spier, Leslie. Growth of Japanese Children Born in America and in Japan. Seattle: University of Washington Press, 1929.
- Spier, Leslie and Sapir, Edward. Wishram Ethnography. Seattle: University of Washington Press, 1930.
- Spier, Leslie. Plains Indian Parfleche Designs. Seattle: University of Washington Press, 1931.
- Spier, Leslie. Yuman Tribes of the Gila River. Chicago: University of Chicago Press, 1933.
- Spier, Leslie. Cultural Relations of the Gila River and Lower Colorado Tribes. Yale University: Yale University Press, Department of the Social Sciences, 1936.
- Spier, Leslie, Riley, Carroll L., Taylor, Walter W. eds. American Historical Anthropology: Essays in Honor of Leslie Spier. Carbondale: Southern Illinois University Press, 1967.
