= Lux v. Haggin =

California court case on water rights (1886)

- Supreme Court of California

Decided April 26, 1886
- Full case name: Charles Lux et al., Appellants, v. James B. Haggin et al. The Kern River Land and Canal Company, Respondent
- Citation(s): 69 Cal. 255; 10 P. 674

Holding
- Riparian water rights are superior to appropriative water rights. Appropriation of water for public use is permitted with just compensation.

Court membership
- Chief Justice: Robert F. Morrison
- Associate Justices: Elisha W. McKinstry, Samuel B. McKee, John R. Sharpstein, James D. Thornton, Erskine M. Ross, Milton H. Myrick

Case opinions
- Majority: McKinstry
- Concurrence: McKee, Sharpstein, Thornton
- Dissent: Ross, joined by Morrison
- Dissent: Myrick

Lux v. Haggin, 69 Cal. 255; 10 P. 674; (1886), is a historic case in the conflict between riparian and appropriative water rights. Decided by a vote of four to three in the Supreme Court of California, the ruling held that appropriative rights were secondary to riparian rights.

== Background ==
The English common law system was adopted by California in 1850. With regards to water rights, English common law specifies that landowners have the right to the water that runs through or adjacent to their property for reasonable household purposes as long as their use does not interfere with the rights of other riparian land owners. These are known as riparian water rights. The English common law interpretation of reasonable household purposes meant domestic uses and small scale subsistence farming. Other landowners whose properties do not have water, have no right to use it .

In 1855, California also adopted the right of prior appropriation. Appropriative rights were based on a first come, first served philosophy. This second system of water rights was developed for miners and farmers who did not own riparian land. The first to appropriate the water's use had rights to it. All those who subsequently established their claim, could only appropriate water if their use did not interfere with the previously established water use. Appropriative rights did not limit the amount of water that could be claimed.

These two systems of water rights were at odds with one another. Appropriative water rights granted the first to claim the water's use complete rights to it. Riparian water rights established that use of the water was an uncontested right that came with the land and did not have to be shared with non-riparian land owners. The case of Lux v. Haggin clarified which system of water rights would prevail in California.

== Parties ==
Plaintiffs: Henry Miller and Charles Lux

Charles Lux and Henry Miller were two German immigrants who met in San Francisco where both had established successful butcher shops. They became business partners and started raising cattle for their shops. In 1868, they began to purchase land in Kern County along Buena Vista Slough, a swampy area that was fed by the Kern River. Based on their land ownership, Miller and Lux claimed riparian rights to the natural flow of the river. Realizing that the Central Valley area was prone to drought, they developed an extensive canal system to irrigate their lands from the slough. By 1877 upstream water appropriation by the Kern County Land and Canal Company had dried out Buena Vista Slough completely. Close to 10,000 head of Miller and Lux's cattle perished that year as a result.

Defendant: James Ben Ali Haggin
Haggin was a wealthy socialite, lawyer, and business man who arrived in California during the gold rush. Among his business ventures was the Kern County Land and Canal Company, which was located along the Kern River and upstream from Miller and Lux's property. Haggin used appropriative water rights to divert water from the Kern River for agricultural irrigation of his large landholdings in Kern County. By 1877, Haggin had diverted so much water from the Kern River that it no longer flowed to Buena Vista Slough.

== History of the case ==
Lux v. Haggin (1881)
Miller and Lux first filed suit against Haggin in 1879. The important issue in this case was determining what constitutes a watercourse. In order for Miller and Lux to be riparian landowners, they had to prove that the slough was in fact a watercourse. Their main argument was that the slough was an integral part of a major water system with a clearly defined waterway: water flowed down from the Sierras to Kern River, through Buena Vista Slough and into Lake Tulare. Haggin, on the other hand, argued that the slough was indistinguishable from swampland, and that the water present in the slough was merely overflow from Lake Tulare. On November 3, 1881, Judge Brundage ruled that "no continuous or defined channel" existed in Buena Vista swamp, and therefore Miller and Lux were not considered riparian land owners. Judge Brundage also included in his opinion that irrigation by means of appropriation was a "natural necessity" in the state of California.

Lux v. Haggin (1884)
In 1884, Miller and Lux appealed the 1881 ruling to the California Supreme Court. In this case, Miller and Lux addressed their property rights. They argued that Haggin's appropriations "carried the Kern River thirty miles from where nature had placed it, making a garden of what nature had made a desert and making a desert of their swampland." In other words, Miller and Lux suggested a violation of their property rights; they had purchased land naturally containing water, and Haggin's upstream diversions had caused the water on their land to dry up. In response, the court agreed with Miller and Lux's appeal for riparian rights and overturned the lower court's ruling by a four to three decision.

== Issue ==
The overarching issue in Lux v. Haggin was whether the court would uphold English common law riparian rights (even though they were poorly suited to California's Mediterranean climate), institute the primacy of appropriative water rights, or create an entirely new system of water rights.

A rehearing by the California Supreme Court in 1886 addressed the question: "Can a private corporation divert the waters of a watercourse, and thereby deprive the riparian proprieters of all use of the same, without just compensation?"

== Decision ==
The court upheld the validity and primacy of riparian rights by a vote of four to three. The majority opinion, by Justice McKinstry, was joined by Justices McKee, Sharpstein, and Thornton. Justices Ross, Morrison, and Myrick dissented. Justice McKinstry affirmed Miller and Lux's riparian rights along Buena Vista Slough, stating that "The owners of land by or through which a watercourse naturally and usually flows have a right of property in the waters of the stream." Justice McKinstry also acknowledged public use of the water; appropriation by irrigation companies or irrigation districts, he conceded, was permitted with just compensation.

== Significance ==
Lux v. Haggin was a historic case in the development of water rights in California. During this time, the population was rapidly increasing and appropriation of water would soon become a necessity. The decision was important because it gave the court a chance to either continue to uphold English common law and riparian rights or give appropriative rights supremacy. In the end, the court recognized both water rights systems, but decided that appropriative rights were secondary to riparian rights. The ruling "created chaos by shackling the state with two fundamentally incompatible water allocation systems." Additionally the original definition of "reasonable" water use under English common law was changed. The court decided that water could be used for commercial and agricultural purposes as long as the use did not negatively affect other riparian landowners. This broadening of the "reasonable" use definition meant that riparian land owners could now use more water than previously allowed.
