= Pixley National Wildlife Refuge =

Wildlife Refuge in the San Joaquin Valley

- IUCN category IV (habitat/species management area)
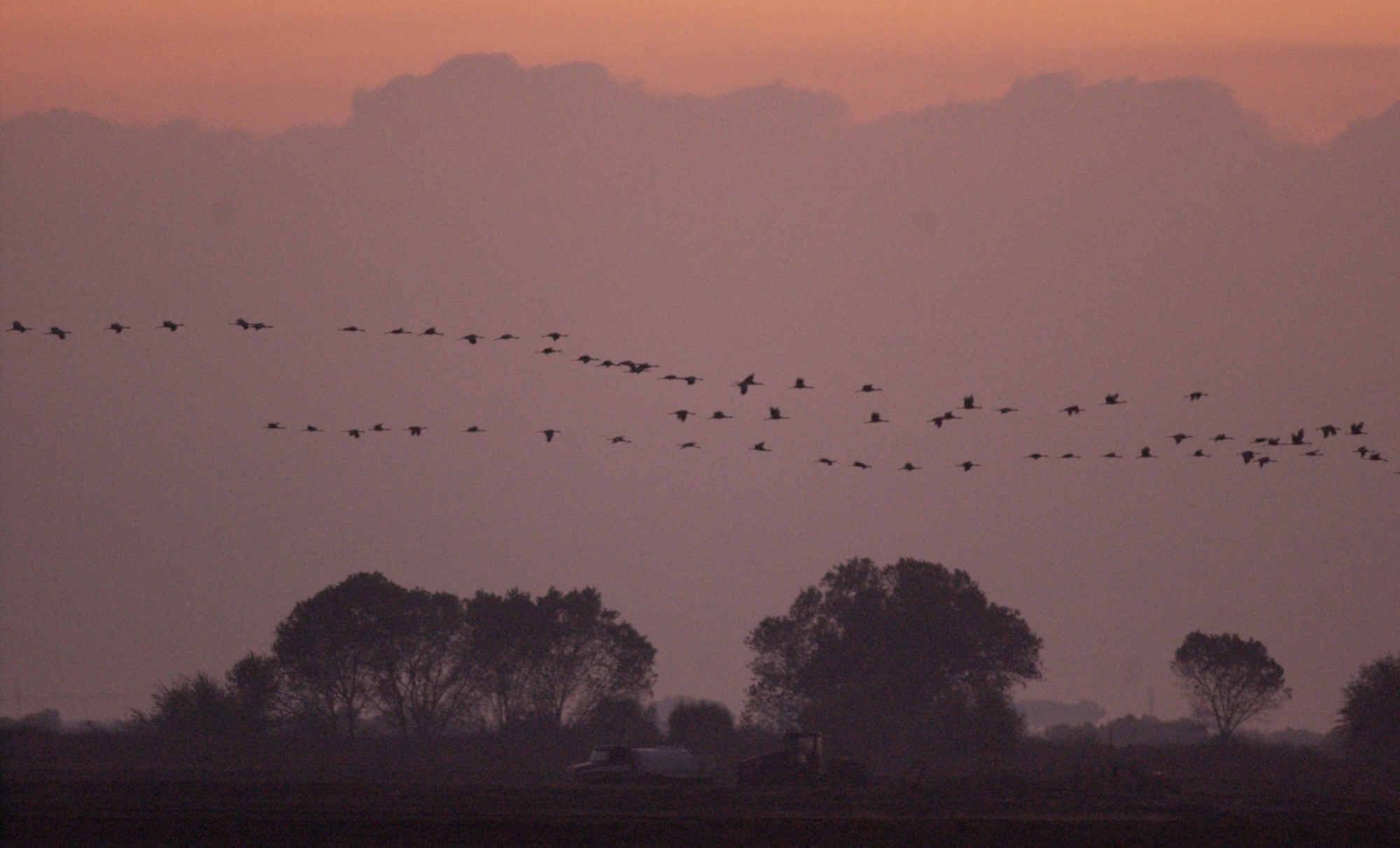
- Sandhill Cranes

- Location within the United States
- Location: Tulare County, California, United States
- Nearest city: Pixley, California
- Coordinates: 35°55′02″N 119°21′44″W
- Area: 6,939 acres (28.08 km^{2})
- Established: 1959
- Governing body: U.S. Fish and Wildlife Service
- Website: Pixley National Wildlife Refuge

Pixley National Wildlife Refuge is located 35 miles (56 km) south of Tulare, California and 45 miles (72 km) north of Bakersfield in the San Joaquin Valley. The 6,939-acre (2,808 ha) nature refuge represents one of the few remaining examples of the grasslands, vernal pools, and playas that once bordered historic Tulare Lake, the largest lake west of the Great Lakes until the late 19th century.

== Wildlife ==
Over 100 bird and 6 reptile species use the wildlife refuge. Approximately 300 acres (120 ha) of managed wetlands provide habitat for migratory waterfowl and shorebirds. Threatened and endangered species include the San Joaquin kit fox, blunt-nosed leopard lizard, Tipton kangaroo rat, and the vernal pool fairy shrimp.

== Access ==
Refuge visitation is by special arrangement only.
