= Fresno Slough =

Distributary of the Kings River in Kings County, California, United States

Coordinates: 36°47′4″N 120°22′8″W

Fresno Slough is a distributary of the Kings River that connects the North Fork Kings River to the San Joaquin River in San Joaquin Valley, Kings County, California.

Until 1879 when irrigation diversions prevented it, Fresno Slough was also an outlet of the overflow waters of Tulare Lake into the San Joaquin River in flood years, when its level topped the 210 foot elevation.

== Modern diversions ==
Mendota Dam, located at the confluence of the San Joaquin River and Fresno Slough, delivers water to the south from Mendota Pool during the irrigation season, and delivers water to Mendota Pool and the San Joaquin River from the Kings River when the Kings River is flooding. Mendota Dam and Mendota Pool have been used for irrigation diversions since the late 1800s.
