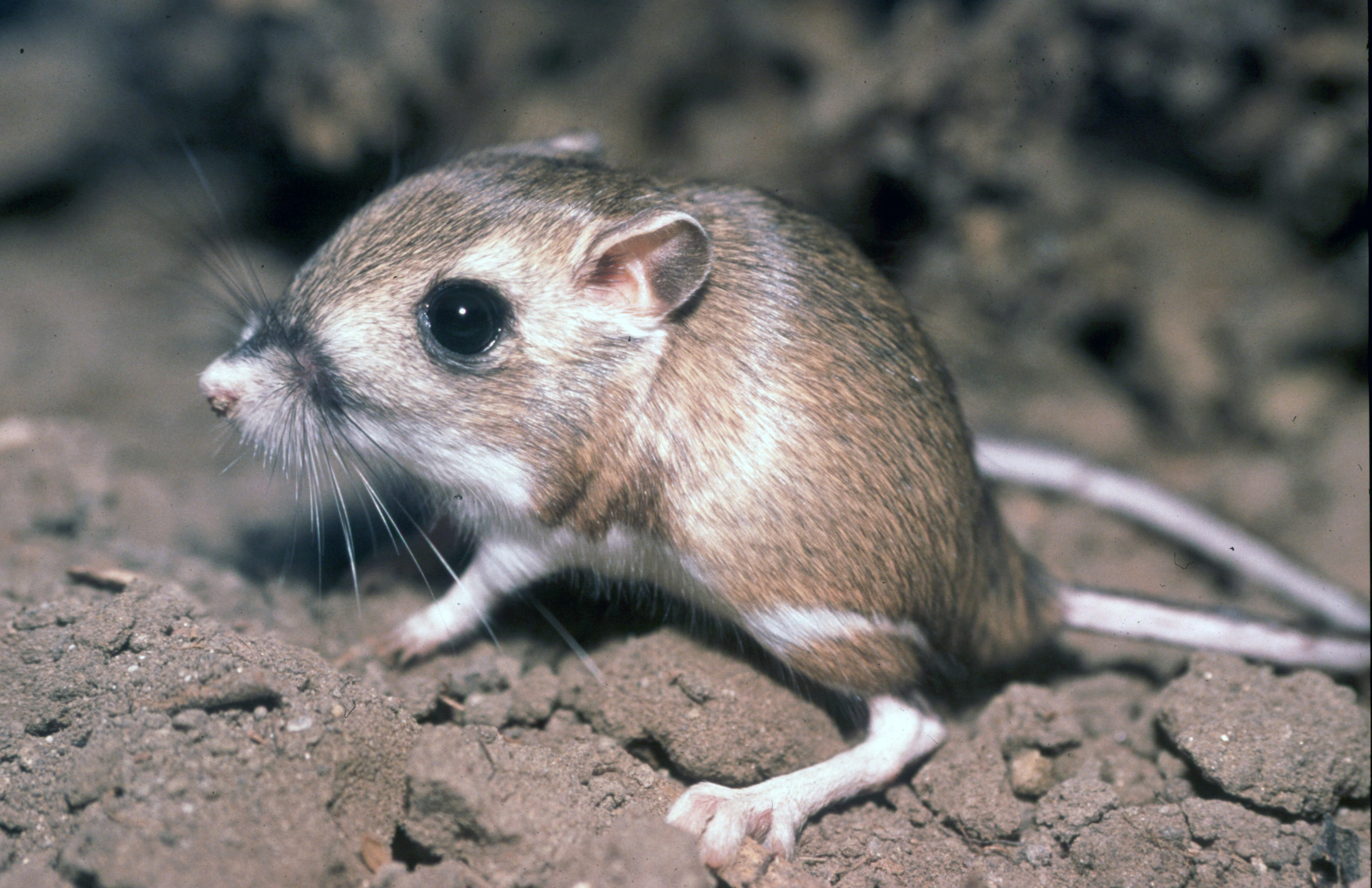

Conservation status
- Endangered (ESA)

Scientific classification
- Kingdom: Animalia
- Phylum: Chordata
- Class: Mammalia
- Order: Rodentia
- Family: Heteromyidae
- Genus: Dipodomys
- Species: D. nitratoides
- Subspecies: D. n. nitratoides

Trinomial name
- Dipodomys nitratoides nitratoides Merriam, 1894

= Tipton kangaroo rat =

Subspecies of rodent

The Tipton kangaroo rat (Dipodomys nitratoides nitratoides), is a subspecies of the San Joaquin kangaroo rat, a rodent in the family Heteromyidae.

== Description ==
Adult Tipton kangaroo rats have small forefeet, exceptionally large hind feet, and long tail. They have a head and body length of about 100 to 110 millimeters and weigh approximately 35 to 38 grams. The tail length is about 125 to 130 millimeters in length. This subspecies is larger than the Fresno kangaroo rat and smaller than the short-nosed kangaroo rat (D. nitratoides brevinasus).

== Distribution ==
This subspecies lives in ground burrows between the Kern National Wildlife Refuge, Delano, and the natural lands surrounding Lamont (southeast of Bakersfield), Kern County, at the Coles Levee Ecosystem Preserve and in other scattered areas to the south in Kern County, in areas west of Tipton, Pixley, and Earlimart, Pixley National Wildlife Refuge, Allensworth Ecological Reserve, and Allensworth State Historical Park in Tulare County.

== Diet ==
Tipton kangaroo rats eat mainly seeds. They also consume some insects and small amounts of herbaceous vegetation when available.

== See also ==
- Kangaroo rat
