= Kern River Slough =

River in California, United States

Coordinates: 35.5431°N 119.5261°W

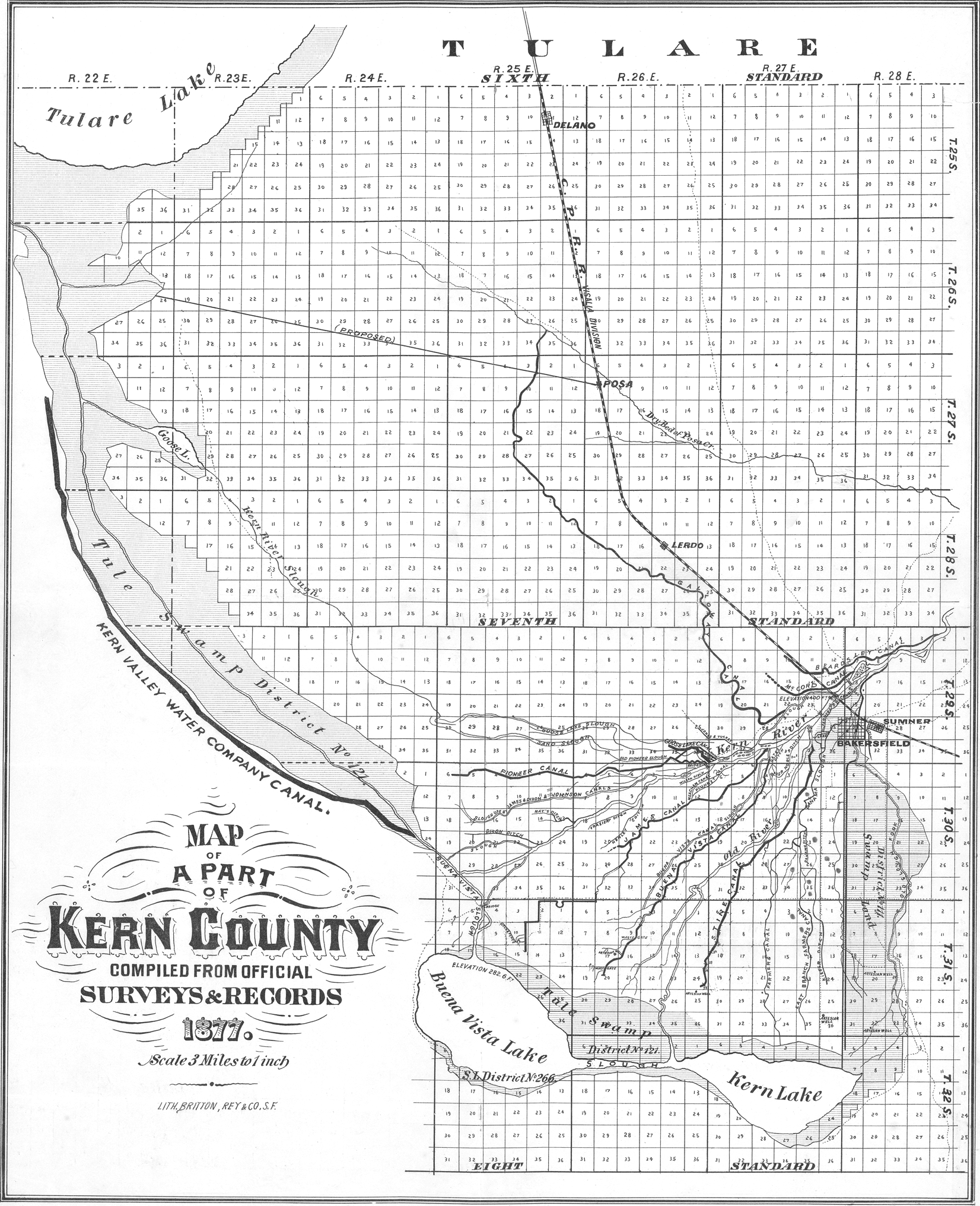
The Kern River Slough traveled northwest from Bakersfield to Goose Lake near Tulare Lake.

Kern River Slough was the distributary of the Kern River running northwest from the vicinity of Bakersfield to Goose Lake near Tulare Lake in Kern County, California.

These former bodies of water in the Tulare Lake Basin of the San Joaquin Valley have now all been diverted for agricultural use.

The Kern River Slough Station was a stagecoach station operated by the Butterfield Overland Mail and was located miles to the southeast of this slough.

== See also ==
- Rivers of Kern County, California
- Geography of the San Joaquin Valley
