= Alpaugh, California =

Alpaugh
- Unincorporated Community; Census Designated Place
- Location in Tulare County and the state of California

- Location in the United States
- Coordinates: 35°53′21″N 119°29′09″W
- Country: United States
- State: California
- County: Tulare

Area
  - Total: 0.42 sq mi (1.08 km^{2})
  - Land: 0.42 sq mi (1.08 km^{2})
  - Water: 0 sq mi (0.00 km^{2})
- Elevation: 213 ft (65 m)

Population (2020)
  - Total: 871
  - Density: 2,083.3/sq mi (804.37/km^{2})
- Time zone: UTC-8 (Pacific (PST))
  - Summer (DST): UTC-7 (PDT)
- ZIP code: 93201
- Area code: 559
- FIPS code: 06-01164
- GNIS feature ID: 2407725

Alpaugh is a census-designated place (CDP) in Tulare County, California, United States. The population was 871 at the 2020 census.

It is named for John Alpaugh, one of the officers of the Home Extension Colony which reclaimed (or land speculated on) the land the town is built on.

== Geography ==
According to the United States Census Bureau, the CDP has a total area of 0.42 square miles (1.1 km^{2}), all land.

The site is located on the historic shoreline of Tulare Lake, once the largest freshwater lake in the USA outside of the Great Lakes. Other towns built on its historic shores include Lemoore and Kettleman City.

Despite being on the edge of the ancient Tulare lakebed, the town is without access to safe drinking water, as high levels of arsenic are found in the municipal water supply. Locals are forced to drink, cook and bathe using bottled water in lieu of exposing themselves to this hazard.

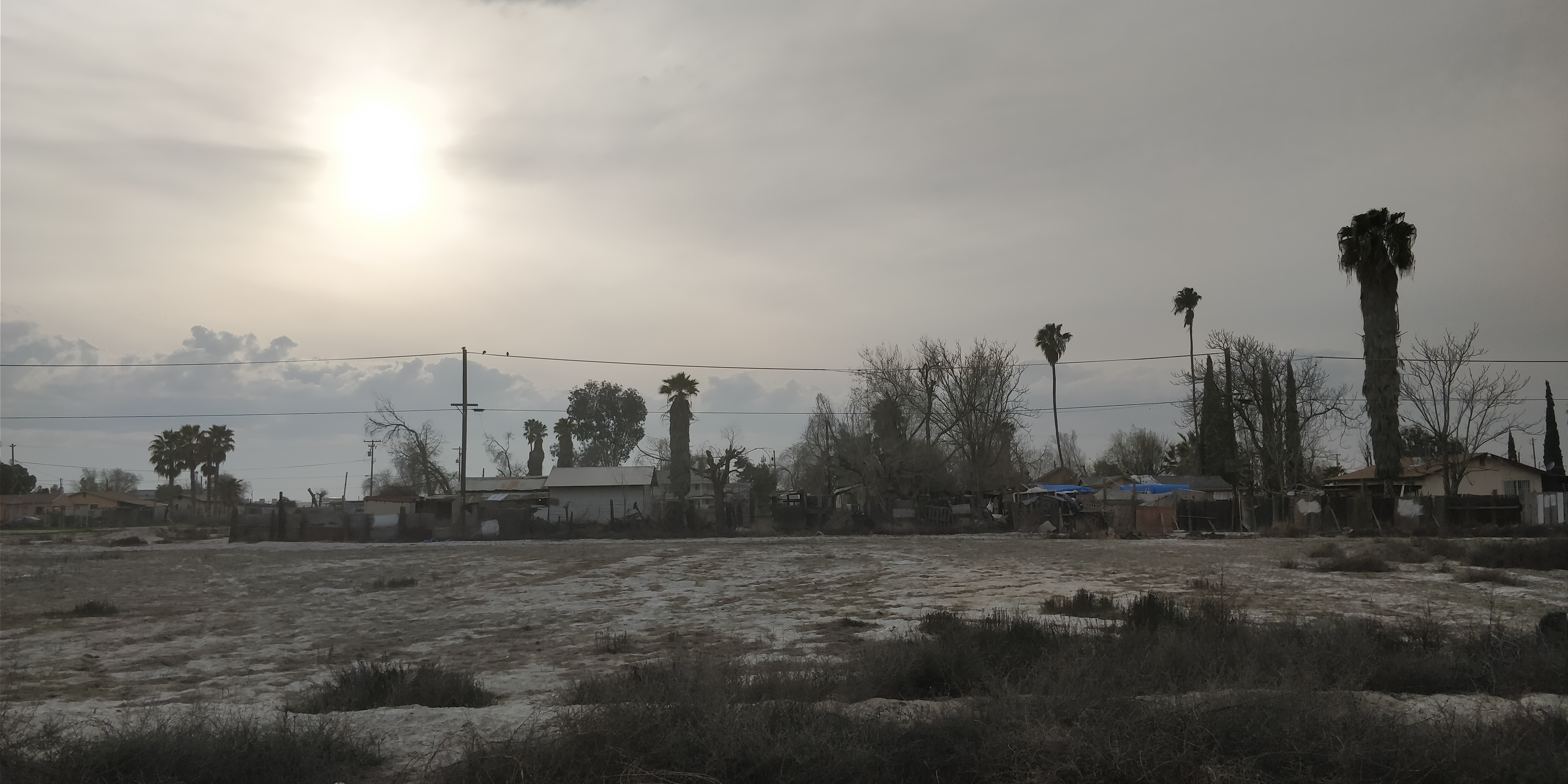
Alpaugh seen from a park on the north end of town. Taken March 2018.

== History ==
Alpaugh's location (once also called Hog Island, Root Island, and Atwell's Island) was once either on an island or a narrow peninsula near the south end of the huge and rich Tulare Lake. A.J. Atwell was a Visalia attorney (and newspaper owner) who raised hogs on the island. The lake at different times supported a very large Native American population, a commercial fishery, herds of tule elk, countless game birds, and much more. The island was a regular port of call for the lake's commercial ferry service. The last time the lake was brim full and overflowed into the San Joaquin River to the sea was 1878. Water diversions of its source waters have since caused the lake to shrink into the tiny remnant of today. Local efforts have been undertaken to increase the lake's size for water storage and wildlife.

Los Angeles real estate developers, the California Home Extension Association, promoted, developed or founded Alpaugh, nearby Wasco, and several other California towns. It has also been referred to as "W.H. Wilber's Second Home Extension Coloney that purchased eight-thousand acres of land surrounding Alpaugh." Los Angeles newspaper articles of the time explained that they were not the original landowners. "The California Home Extension association does not represent land owners; it has no lands of its own for sale."

In 1920 and 1921 both oil and large gas fields were found near Alpaugh.

== Demographics ==
Historical population
Census	Pop.	Note	%±
2000	761		—
2010	1,026		34.8%
2020	871		−15.1%
U.S. Decennial Census; 1860–1870 1880-1890; 1900 1910 1920; 1930 1940 1950; 1960 1970 1980; 1990 2000 2010

Alpaugh first appeared as a census designated place in the 2000 U.S. census.

=== 2020 census ===
As of the 2020 census, Alpaugh had a population of 871. The population density was 2,083.7 inhabitants per square mile (804.5/km^{2}). The age distribution was 39.7% under the age of 18, 10.6% aged 18 to 24, 22.2% aged 25 to 44, 21.0% aged 45 to 64, and 6.5% who were 65 years of age or older. The median age was 24.9 years. For every 100 females, there were 107.4 males, and for every 100 females age 18 and over there were 113.4 males age 18 and over.

0.0% of residents lived in urban areas, while 100.0% lived in rural areas.

The whole population lived in households. There were 190 households, of which 55.8% had children under the age of 18 living in them. Of all households, 40.0% were married-couple households, 13.7% were cohabiting couple households, 28.9% had a female householder with no partner present, and 17.4% had a male householder with no partner present. About 16.8% of all households were made up of individuals and 8.4% had someone living alone who was 65 years of age or older. The average household size was 4.58. There were 143 families (75.3% of all households).

There were 206 housing units at an average density of 492.8 units per square mile (190.3 units/km^{2}), of which 190 (92.2%) were occupied. Of the occupied units, 54.7% were owner-occupied and 45.3% were renter-occupied. The homeowner vacancy rate was 5.3% and the rental vacancy rate was 2.3%.

Racial composition as of the 2020 census
Race	Number	Percent
White	169	19.4%
Black or African American	3	0.3%
American Indian and Alaska Native	23	2.6%
Asian	6	0.7%
Native Hawaiian and Other Pacific Islander	0	0.0%
Some other race	396	45.5%
Two or more races	274	31.5%
Hispanic or Latino (of any race)	768	88.2%

=== Income ===
In 2023, the US Census Bureau estimated that the median household income was $42,917, and the per capita income was $12,404.

== Government ==
In the California State Legislature, Alpaugh is in the 16th senatorial district, represented by Democrat Melissa Hurtado, and in the 33rd Assembly district, represented by Republican Alexandra Macedo.

In the United States House of Representatives, Alpaugh is in California's 22nd congressional district, represented by Republican David Valadao.

== Railroads ==
Alpaugh is served by the West Isle Line, a private carrier railroad owned by Western Farm Services. Since 1998 the West Isle Line has operated over the 6-mile (9.7 km) "Alpaugh Branch" of the former Atchison, Topeka and Santa Fe Railway. The West Isle Line runs east from Alpaugh to a connection with the BNSF Railway at "Stoil". The "Alpaugh Branch" was constructed in 1914.

== Education ==
The CDP is served by the Alpaugh Unified School District.
