= Buena Vista Lake =

Former fresh-water lake in Kern County, California

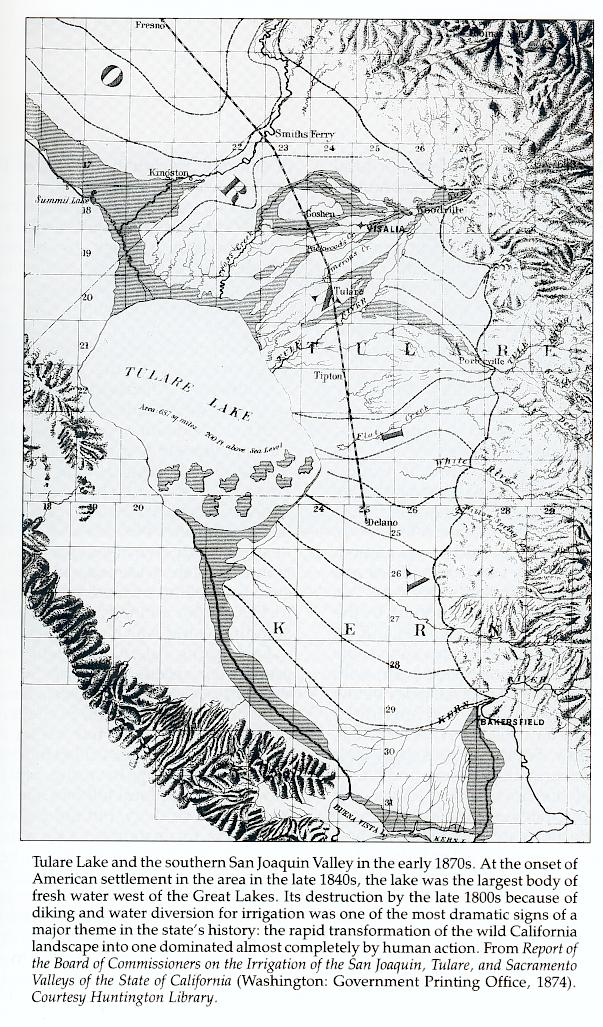

- Location within California Location within the United States
- Location: San Joaquin Valley; Kern County, California
- Coordinates: 35.19191°N 119.294557°W
- Type: dry lake
- Primary inflows: Kern River; Connecting Slough
- Basin countries: United States
- Surface area: 60 to 150 square miles (160 to 390 km^{2})
- Average depth: 3.3 m (11 ft)
- Surface elevation: 88 m (289 ft)

Buena Vista Lake was a fresh-water lake in Kern County, California, in the Tulare Lake Basin in the southern San Joaquin Valley, California.

Buena Vista Lake was the second largest of several similar lakes in the Tulare Lake basin, and was fed by the waters of the Kern River. The Kern River's flow went into Buena Vista Lake southwest through the site of Bakersfield via its main distributary channels or south through the Kern River Slough distributary into Kern Lake and then into Buena Vista Lake via Connecting Slough.

In times when Buena Vista Lake overflowed it first backed up into Kern Lake making one large lake. When this larger lake overflowed it flowed out through the Buena Vista Slough and Kern River channel northwest of Buena Vista Lake through tule marshland and Goose Lake, into Tulare Lake.

The land on the former lakebed was later owned by Miller & Lux. The Miller heirs later sold the land to the J. G. Boswell Company.

Today Lake Webb and Lake Evans occupy the lakebed on the northern shore of the former Buena Vista Lake.

In June 2023, with 300% snow pack in the Southern Sierra Mountains, the Kern river started to fill the top section of Lake Buena Vista to a depth of only a few feet.

Aerial views of Buena Vista Lake.

Aerial views of Buena Vista Lake.

== Tulamniu Indian Site ==
Tulamniu Indian Site
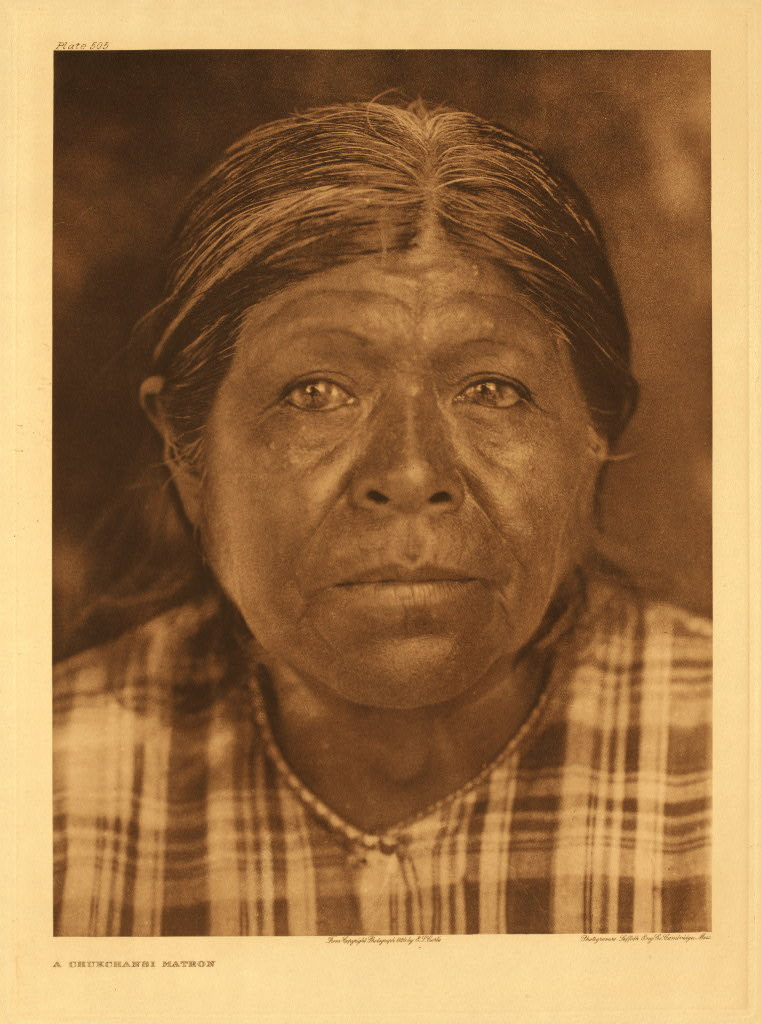
- A Buena Vista Yokuts - Tulamniu Indian
- Interactive map of Tulamniu Indian Site
- Location: Marker is at Block House #BV4 North of Buena Vista Pumping Station

California Historical Landmark
- Official name: Tulamniu Indian Site
- Designated: September 6, 1941
- Reference no.: 374

On Buena Vista Lake south shores was the site of the Tulamniu Indians, who spoke Buena Vista Yokuts. The site is a California Historical Landmark number 374.

California Historical Landmark reads:

NO. 374 TULAMNIU INDIAN SITE – The old Yokuts village of Tulamniu was named Buena Vista by Spanish Commander Fages in 1772. Fr. Zalvidea again recorded the site in 1806. This village was occupied for several centuries, and in 1933–34 its site was excavated by the Smithsonian Institution.

== See also ==
- List of lakes in California
- California Historical Landmarks in Kern County
- California Historical Landmark
