= Frank Forrest Latta =

Frank Forrest Latta (1892–1983), was a California historian and ethnographer of the Yokuts people. He also wrote histories of the early European-American settlement of the San Joaquin Valley.

== Early life ==
Frank Forrest Latta was the son of Presbyterian minister Eli C. Latta and teacher Harmonia Campbell, born on September 18, 1892, in Stanislaus County, near Orestimba Creek. Latta lived most of his life in the San Joaquin Valley. His father and three older brothers had come to California from Arkansas during the California Gold Rush. His father and one brother remained in California, where they were joined by his mother. One brother returned to Arkansas, and the third wrote that he was returning to Arkansas with $8,000 in gold, but disappeared without a trace.

As a young boy Latta worked on several ranches in the San Joaquin Valley. He became interested in the stories of the early pioneers. In 1906, at the age of 14, he began interviewing people and gathering research regarding early pioneer life and farming in California. Latta also spent much time researching the Miller & Lux farming corporation and its founders Henry Miller and Charles Lux.

Frank F. Latta became a teacher. He taught drafting and carpentry at high schools in Gustine, Porterville, Shafter and Bakersfield, California from 1915 to 1945.

In 1919, he married Jeanette Allen. They had four children together.

== Historical avocation ==
When not teaching, Latta was traveling in the San Joaquin Valley, interviewing European-American pioneers and Native Americans, gathering artifacts and articles, or writing at home. He published numerous articles in San Joaquin Valley newspapers during the 1920s and 1930s.[dead link]

In the early 1920s, Latta began interviewing the Yokuts and settlers who were acquainted with them. Among these was Thomas Jefferson Mayfield, ("Uncle Jeff"), the youngest son of William Mayfield, a settler from Texas who had developed a place on the Kern River. Following the death of his mother, Uncle Jeff grew up in a Yokuts village. Latta wrote about his life, first as a series of newspaper articles, then as a book, Uncle Jeff's Story: A Tale of a San Joaquin Valley Pioneer and His Life with the Yokuts Indians (1929).

Latta's first work to focus on Native Americans in the San Joaquin Valley was California Indian Folklore (1936). In it he described the culture of the many bands of the Yokuts.

Also in 1936 Latta published El Camino Viejo á Los Angeles. He described the route and history of El Camino Viejo, the old Spanish road and the settlements along it on the west side of the San Joaquin Valley, from Los Angeles to what is now Oakland. Born near where that road crossed Orestimba Creek, Latta had traced the route on his trips through the valley; he had also taken photos of many of its features and landmarks. In 1938, Latta was honored with the presidency of the League of Western Writers.

Latta helped found the Kern County Museum in Bakersfield in 1941. He worked both as a curator and as its director from 1945 until 1956.

He also continued his research into the Yokuts, interviewing more than 200 elders and a number of settlers. From this information gathered for more than a half-century, Latta compiled and published the Handbook of Yokuts Indians (1949). The first edition was published in a limited issue of 500 copies, through the Kern County Museum. A revised and enlarged edition was published by Coyote Press in 1977.

Also in 1949, Latta published his book Black Gold In The Joaquin, the story of the oil industry in the San Joaquin Valley. He explored Native American use of the oil, to the discoveries and the development of the extraction technology from the mid–19th century to 1900.

In 1956 Latta moved to Santa Cruz, purchasing the Gazos Ranch in southern San Mateo County. This was formerly known as the Steele Ranch and was located south of Pescadero near Gazos Creek. He and his wife Jean intended to retire there. They wanted to develop the ranch as a historical museum to house his extensive collection of items and artifacts he had collected.

He also intended to develop an 80-acre picnic and camping area, which would extend for a mile along the coast between Ano Nuevo Island and Pigeon Point. He expected to install a reconstruction of a California Indian village and a pioneer town. After going through official county procedures, Latta thought he was ready to begin this larger project, but it was delayed in the late 1950s.

He did establish the Rancho Gazos Historical Indian and Early Californian Museum.

== Later life ==
Late in his life, Latta published a series of books dealing with historic outlaws and other items. The Dalton Gang Days and the Saga of Rancho El Tejon were published in 1976. Tailholt Tales, an expanded version of Mayfield's memoir, was also published in that year., decades after his first efforts at correcting, commenting upon and filling out the original slim volume in the 1920s. Death Valley '49ers was first published in 1979, and Joaquín Murrieta and His Horse Gangs, published in 1980.

Latta died in Santa Cruz on May 8, 1983. He was buried at Hills Ferry Cemetery in Newman, California, not far from where he was born.

== Publications ==
- California Indian Folklore (1936)
- El Camino Viejo á Los Angeles (1936)
- Handbook of Yokuts Indians (1949)
- Black Gold in the Joaquin (1949)
- The Dalton Gang Days (1976)
- Saga of Rancho El Tejon (1976)
- Tailholt Tales (1976)
- Death Valley '49ers (1979)
- Joaquín Murrieta and His Horse Gangs (1980)
