= Anna H. Gayton =

American anthropologist

- Born: September 20, 1899; Santa Cruz, California, United States
- Died: September 18, 1977 (aged 77)
- Education: University of California, Berkeley
- Occupations: Anthropologist, folklorist, and museum curator
- Employer(s): American Anthropologist; Phoebe A. Hearst Museum of Anthropology
- Organization: American Folklore Society
- Spouse: Leslie Spier (m. 1931, d. 1961)

Anna Hadwick Gayton (September 20, 1899 – September 18, 1977) was an American anthropologist, folklorist, and museum curator. She is most recognized for her role in "compiling and analyzing Californian Indian mythology" and was elected President of the American Folklore Society in 1950.

== Personal life and education ==
Gayton was born on September 20, 1899, in Santa Cruz, California. She attended the University of California, Berkeley, receiving a B.A. degree in 1923 and M.A. degree in 1924.

In 1928, Gayton completed her PhD in anthropology under Alfred Kroeber and Robert H. Lowie and a minor in psychology under Edward C. Tolman. Gayton was the first woman to receive a PhD in anthropology from Berkeley. Her dissertation was titled 'The Narcotic Plant Datura in Aboriginal American Culture'.

During her studies, she served as an editorial assistant to the journal American Anthropologist. She would again hold this role again between 1932 and 1934 and also held a similar role between 1934 and 1939 with Yale University Publications in Anthropology.

In 1931, Gayton married fellow anthropologist, Leslie Spier.

Gayton died on September 18, 1977, aged 77.

== Research ==
As part of her research for her PhD, Gayton conducted fieldwork with the Yokuts and Western Mono peoples: she would go on to publish nine essays based upon Yokuts and Mono myth and oral tradition.

From 1925 to 1926, prior to receiving her degree, Gayton worked with Kroeber as a Museum Research Assistant in Peruvian archaeology, focusing on the Uhle pottery collections. From 1925 to 1929, she conducted an investigation of the "political life" of the Yokuts and Western Mono peoples in the San Joaquin valley of California, focusing on reconstructing the childhoods of those born in the mid-19th century. This investigation, taking an "ecological approach" to Indigenous politics, was the first of its kind. She was also a National Research Council Fellow from 1929 to 1930, continuing the ethnographic research on the Yokuts and Western Mono peoples that she had started during her time as a research assistant.

== Folklore ==
During the 1930s, Gayton became active in the American Folklore Society (AFS). She was reviews editor of the Journal of American Folklore from 1935 to 1940 and associate editor from 1940 to 1943. She would serve as the chair of the AFS's Committee on Research in Folklore from 1945 to 1948, as Vice President of the AFS in 1947 and president in 1950.

During this period, Gayton had commenced a study of the Feast of the Holy Spirit among Azorean Portuguese of California, aided by a Guggenheim Fellowship awarded to her in 1947.

She has been hailed as a "pioneer advocate of comparative folklore studies".

== Academia and curating ==
In 1948, Gayton joined the staff of the Department of Decorative Art at the University of California, Berkeley. The main focus of her research became Peruvian textiles in the university's collections, work begun by her predecessor in the Department of Decorative Art, Lila M O'Neale.

Gayton continued this research into ancient Peruvian costume as the (unpaid) curator of textiles at Berkeley's Robert H. Lowie Museum of Anthropology (now Phoebe A. Hearst Museum of Anthropology). She was particularly associated with ancient materials collected by the archaeologists Max Uhle and Charlotte Uhle.

In 1965, toward the end of her career, Gayton worked as the Vice President of the Institute of Andean Studies. She retired from teaching the same year.

== Selected publications ==
Gayton, Anna Hadwick (1927). The Uhle Collections from Nievería. Berkeley (Calif.): University of California Press. OCLC 882742385.

Gayton, A. H; Kroeber, A. L; Uhle, Max (1927). The Uhle pottery collections from Nazca,. Berkeley, Calif.: University of California Press. OCLC 3096352.

Gayton, A. H. (1935). "Areal Affiliations of California Folktales". American Anthropologist. 37 (4): 582–599. ISSN 0002-7294.

Gayton, A. H. (1935). "The Orpheus Myth in North America." The Journal of American Folklore. 48 (189): 263-293. doi:10.2307/535272.

Gayton, A. H. (1942). "English Ballads and Indian Myths". The Journal of American Folklore. 55 (217): 121–125. doi:10.2307/535249. ISSN 0021-8715.

Gayton, A. H. (1945). "Yokuts and Western Mono Social Organization". American Anthropologist. 47 (3): 409–426. ISSN 0002-7294.

Gayton, A. H. (1946). "Culture-Environment Integration: External References in Yokuts Life". Southwestern Journal of Anthropology. 2 (3): 252–268. ISSN 0038-4801.

Gayton, Anna Hadwick (1948). Yokuts and Western mono ethnography /A. H. Gayton. Berkeley; Los Angeles: University of California Press. OCLC 600867859.

Gayton, A. H. (1948). "The "Festa da Serreta" at Gustine". Western Folklore. 7 (3): 251–265. doi:10.2307/1497549. ISSN 0043-373X

Gayton, A. H. (1948). "Folklore and Anthropology". Utah Humanities Review. 2: 26–31.

Gayton, A. H. (1951). "Perspectives in Folklore". The Journal of American Folklore. 64 (252): 147–150. doi:10.2307/536632. ISSN 0021-8715.

Gayton, A. H. (1955). "A New Type of Ancient Peruvian Shirt". American Antiquity. 20 (3): 263–270. doi:10.2307/277003. ISSN 0002-7316.

Gayton, A. H. (1961). "Early Paracas Style Textiles From Yauca, Peru". Archaeology. 14 (2): 117–121. ISSN 0003-8113.

Riesenberg, Saul H.; Gayton, A. H. (1952). "Caroline Island Belt Weaving". Southwestern Journal of Anthropology. 8 (3): 342–375. ISSN 0038-4801.

Rogers, Barbara Thrall; Gayton, A. H. (1944). "Twenty-Seven Chukchansi Yokuts Myths". The Journal of American Folklore. 57 (225): 190–207. doi:10.2307/535966. ISSN 0021-8715.

Stumer, Louis M.; Gayton, A. H. (1958). "A Horizontal-Necked Shirt from Marques, Peru". American Antiquity. 24 (2): 181–182. doi:10.2307/277480. ISSN 0002-7316.

Gayton, A. H. (1967). "Textiles from Hacha, Peru." Ñawpa Pacha. 5 (1): 1-13. doi:10.1179/naw.1967.5.1.001.
