= Tulare Lake =

Freshwater dry lake in the southern San Joaquin Valley, California, United States

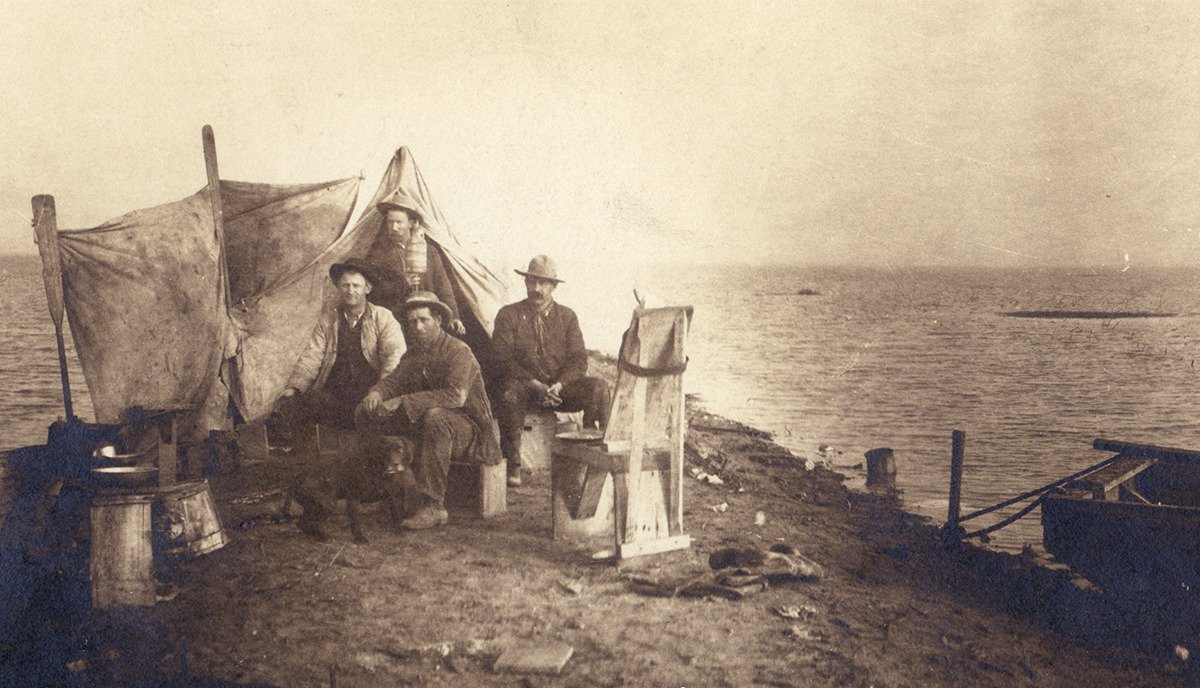
- A group of men camping at the shores of Tulare Lake, 1880

- Location within California
- Location: San Joaquin Valley; Kings County, California
- Coordinates: 36°3′0″N 119°47′17″W
- Type: Dry lake
- Primary inflows: Kaweah River; Kern River; Kings River; Tule River; White River
- Primary outflows: Evaporation, historically underground seepage to San Joaquin River, occasional flow to Suisun Bay
- Basin countries: United States
- Max. length: Dry bed 81 mi (130 km)
- Surface area: Dry bed 690 sq mi (1,780 km^{2})
- Average depth: Dry
- Water volume: 6.5 million acre-feet (8.0 km^{3}) at capacity
- Surface elevation: 187 ft (57 m) 203 ft (62 m) 210 ft (64 m) drains into Fresno Slough
- Settlements: Hanford; Corcoran; Alpaugh
- References: U.S. Geological Survey Geographic Names Information System: Tulare Lake

Tulare Lake (/tʊˈlɛəri/) or Tache Lake (Yokuts: Pah-áh-su, Pah-áh-sē) is an ephemeral freshwater lake in the southern San Joaquin Valley, within the Central Valley region of the U.S. state of California. Historically, Tulare Lake was once the largest freshwater lake west of the Mississippi River in surface area. For thousands of years, from the Paleolithic onward, Tulare Lake was a uniquely rich area, which supported perhaps the largest population of Native Americans north of present-day Mexico.

In the second half of the 19th century, Tulare Lake was dried up by diverting its tributaries for irrigation and municipal water uses. In modern times, it is usually a dry lake with residual wetlands and marshes. The lake reappears during unusually high levels of rainfall or snowmelt as it did in 1942, 1969, 1983, 1997, 1998, and 2023.

== Name ==
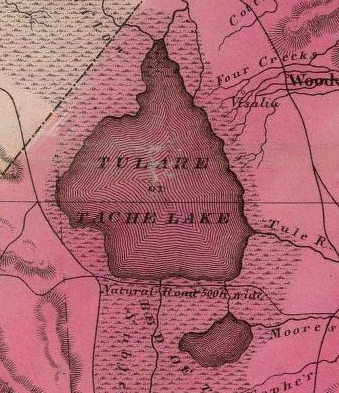
A map from 1853 showing separate Chintache and Tontache basins.

The Spanish word tular (plural: tulares) refers to a field of tule rush. Spanish captain Pedro Fages led the first excursions to the southern San Joaquin Valley in 1773.

This plain will exceed one hundred and twenty leagues in length and in parts is twenty, fifteen and even less in width. It is all a labyrinth of lakes and tulares, and the river San Francisco, divided into several branches, winding in the middle of the plain, now enters and now flows out of the lakes, until very near to the place where it enters into the estuary of the river.

Tulare ultimately derives from Classical Nahuatl tōlin, "rush" or "reeds". The name is thus cognate with various Mesoamerican sites, such as Tula and Tultepec.

A Tachi name of the lake is Pa'ashi which translates to "big water". Other variants include Chentache (or Chintache) and Chataqui.

== Geologic history ==
Before 600,000 years ago, Lake Corcoran covered the Central Valley of California. 600,000 years ago a new outlet formed in the present day San Francisco Bay, rapidly carving an outlet through Carquinez Strait, probably catastrophically, and drained the lake, leaving the Buena Vista, Kern and Tulare Lakes as remnants. The lake was part of a 13,700-square-mile (35,400 km^{2}) partially endorheic basin, at the south end of the San Joaquin Valley, where it received water from the Kern, Tule, and Kaweah Rivers, as well as from southern distributaries of the Kings.

It was separated from the rest of the San Joaquin Valley by tectonic subsidence and alluvial fans extending out from Los Gatos Creek in the Coast Ranges and the Kings River in the Sierra Nevada. Above a threshold elevation of 207 to 210 feet (63 to 64 m), it overflowed northward into the then-extant Summit Lake (southwest of Riverdale), thence via Fresno Slough to the San Joaquin River. This happened in 19 of 29 years from 1850 to 1878. No overflows occurred after 1878 due to increasing diversions of tributary waters for agricultural irrigation and municipal water uses. By 1899, the lake was dry except for residual wetlands and occasional floods.

== Geography ==
Tulare Lake was the largest of several lakes in its lower basin. Most of the Kern River's flow first went into Kern Lake and Buena Vista Lake via the Kern River and Kern River Slough southwest and south of the site of Bakersfield. If they overflowed, it was through the Kern River channel northwest through tule marshland and Goose Lake, into Tulare Lake.

=== Islands ===
During times of high water, the ridge of high ground separating the upper Chintache basin from the lower Tontache basin became an archipelago in the southern part of the lake. During times of low water, this ridge created two separate lakes. Today, these former islands make up the Sand Ridge in Kings County.

The largest of these islands, Atwell's Island, was originally known as Hog-Root Island or Root Island. It was owned by Allen J. Atwell of Visalia, California, who introduced hogs onto the island. In early history, it was the site of the Wowol village, Chawlowin. Today the city of Alpaugh, California, sits on the remnants of Atwell's Island. Atwell Island was the largest of the Tulare Lake archipelago and has the latest recorded habitation by indigenous peoples. A Bird Island is shown in an 1876 map at the tip of Atwell Island's 'teardrop' shape which shows a small, oblate island.

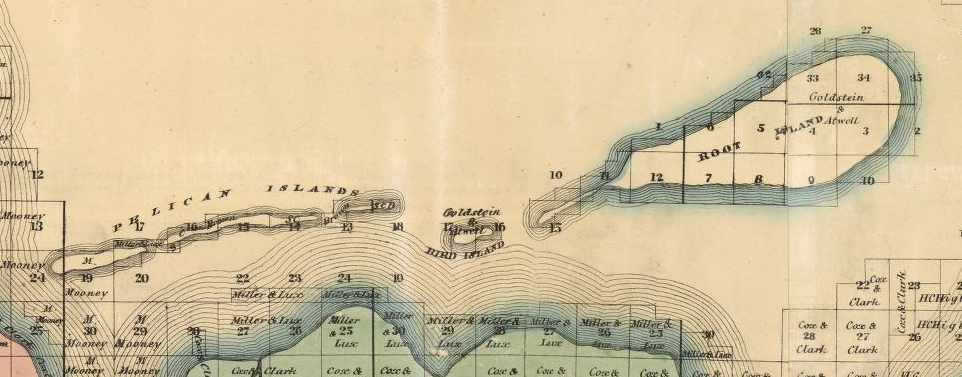
An 1876 map of Tulare County depicting an archipelago named the Pelican Islands, a small island known as Bird Island, and "Root Island" which would become Atwell's Island.

A Wowol village on Atwell's Island was named Chawlowin. It was occupied after 1852 by refugee Yokuts natives. Yoimut described semi-traditional life at Chawlowin:

My mother found almost all of her relations there at Chawlowin. Her brother had his family there and two or three of her uncles were there, too. They had all come back to that camp from Tule River Reservation, where the soldiers had taken them from Téjon Ranch. They wanted to stay at their old home. These people did not go back to the old village at the mouth of Deer Creek and White River because they would come back and get them. They were hid in the tules in tumlus (toom-loos) houses at the north side of the Island.

Gull Island was a small islet at the mouth of the Tule River, extending westward from the south bank of the Tule River. It was a narrow bar which was low, muddy, and had no vegetation. It was named for the large number of gulls which nested at the site.

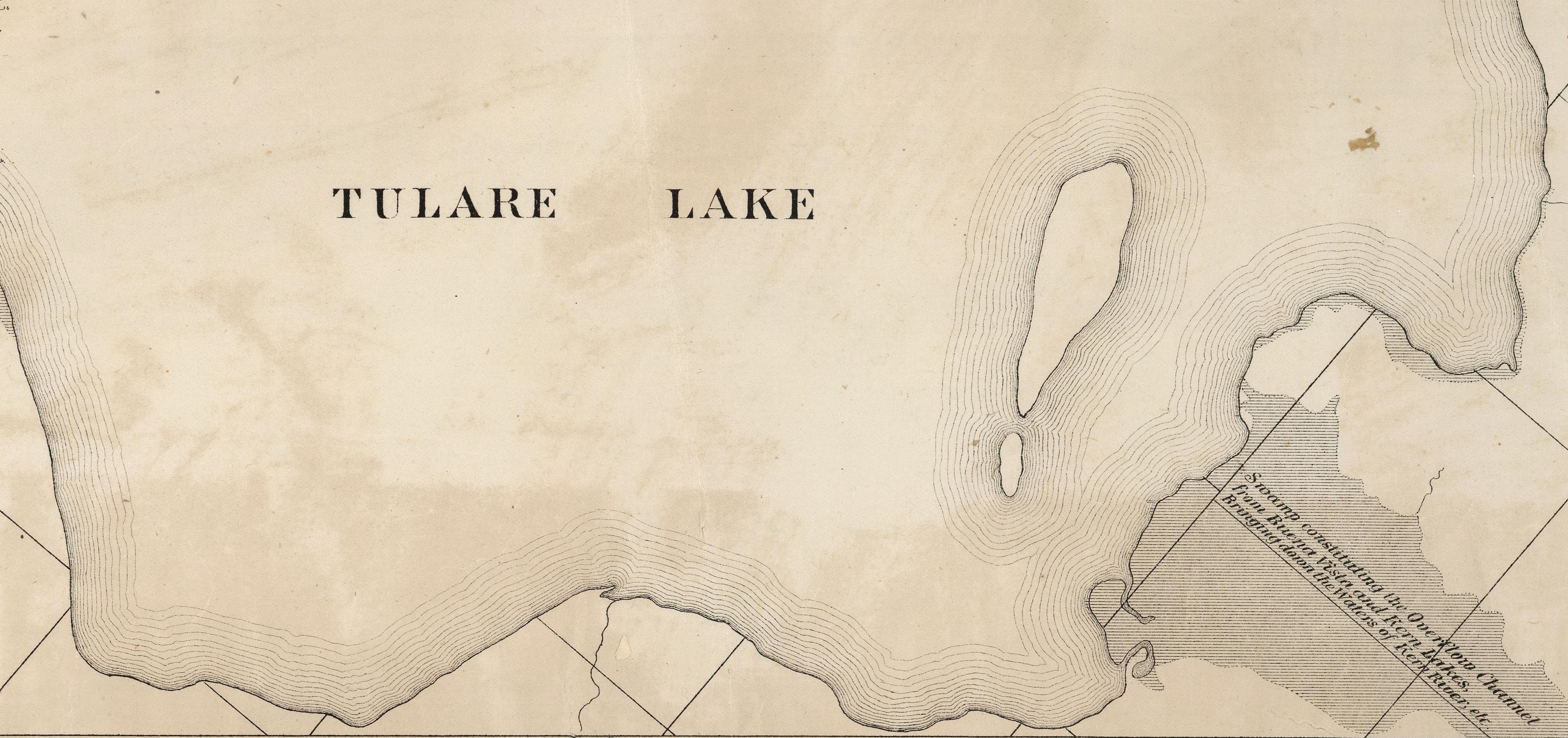
An 1877 irrigation map depicting the western shore of Tulare Lake, including two islands in the southern part

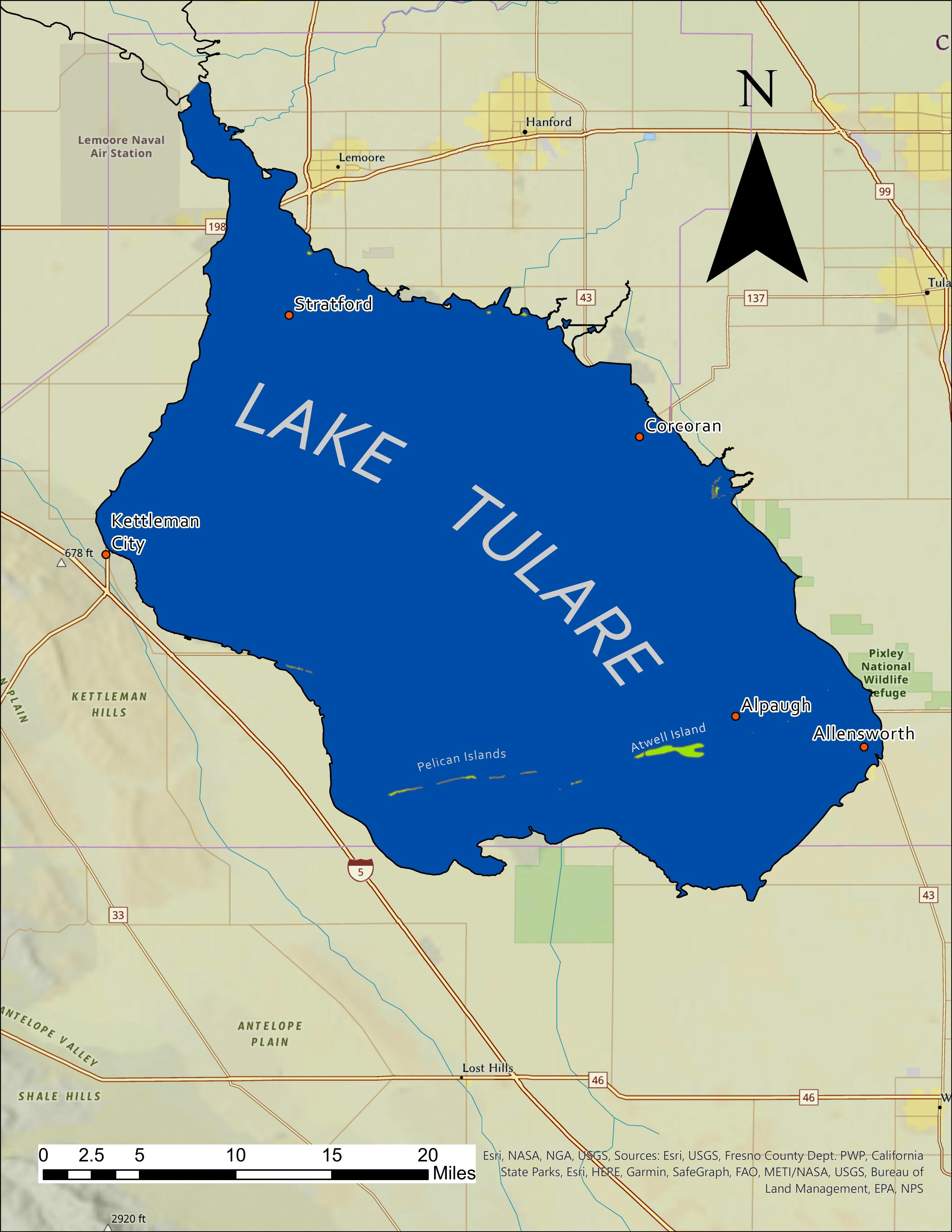
Lake Tulare (at full capacity) as it would appear in California today. It would be able to hold 6.5 million acre-feet (8.0×10^{9} m^{3}) of water. Created from USGS lidar data captured in 2019.

Pelican Island was formed from deposits of the Kings River as an extension of its east channel, about a mile long and ten to sixty feet wide in 1883. It was named, as with Gull Island, for the vast number of white pelicans that nested on there. Cormorants also were present.

Skull Island extended between five and six miles and was just over half a mile wide, the highest part being about twenty feet above the lakebed. Skull Island is one of the more locally famous landmarks. Frank F. Latta identifies it with the Calaveres [sic] of the early Spanish settlers. Yoimut (Josie Alonzo) described a village, Witi'tsolo wın, probably on or near the site, to Anna Hadwick Gayton, which she visited between 1860 and 1870.

Throughout the 19th century it was common for settlers in the Central Valley to raid Skull Island. Dr. William Ferguson Cartmill, who numerous streets are named after in Tulare County, took several skulls from the site and kept them in his house. Local legend holds of a great "Indian battle" that took place at Skull Island. It is far more likely that the mass grave on Skull Island was due to an epidemic, probably smallpox.

For many years the tradition was that these unburied skeletons were the results of a great Indian battle. We can well believe upon good authority that [the battle] was really not the case, but that during the pestilence of 1833 this tribe was probably killed by the same plague which almost entirely depopulated the entire San Joaquin Valley.

— Frank F. Latta, Tulare Daily Times Tuesday, 9 June 1931

== Ecology ==
=== Flora ===
Native ecosystems of the region ranged from saltbrush scrub and alkali sink to valley grassland and wetland. Today, alfalfa is grown on some parts of the southern basin and invasive saltcedar is recorded in natural habitats.

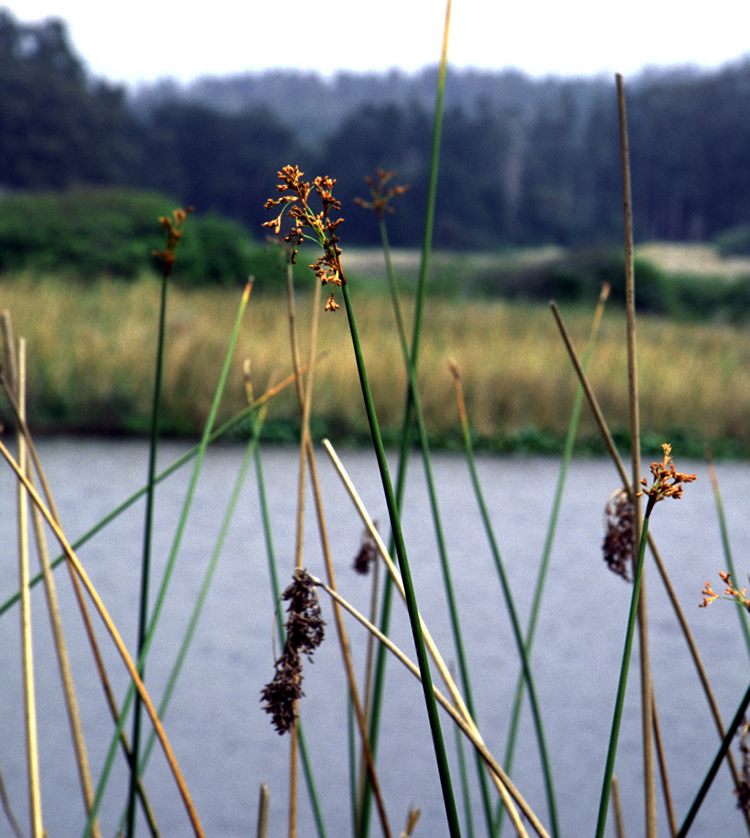
Schoenoplectus acutus at the Humboldt Bay National Wildlife Refuge. Tule reeds between 39 and 118 inches (1 and 3 m) in height covered the Tulare Lake archipelago.

=== Fauna ===
Indigenous fauna of the Sand Ridge area include Buena Vista Lake shrew (Sorex ornatus relictus), southwestern pond turtle (Actinemys pallida), fulvous whistling duck (Dendrocygna bicolor), least bittern (Ixobrychus exilis), California red-legged frog (Rana aurora draytonii), giant garter snake (Thamnophis gigas), and the extinct thicktail chub (Gila crassicauda).

Other species native or present in the area are sandhill cranes and tricolored blackbird. Historically attested species (sometimes present in nearby placenames) like the tule elk and pronghorn antelope were of economic importance to Native American peoples living in the area. Grizzly Adams hunted tule elk on Pelican Island in the 1850s.

The re-emergence of the lake can lead to explosions of the mosquito population in the area, which raises the concern of mosquito borne illness for people living in the area.

== History ==
=== Pre colonial ===
The Tulare Lake region has been continually inhabited for more than 10,000 years. The Witt Site, on the shores of Tulare Lake, has yielded fluted and stemmed points from Paleoindian cultures, flaked stone crescents, Pinto points, drills, and limaces or "humpies." Fragmented mineralized bone have been identified as horse (Equus), bison (Bison), ground sloth (Paramylodon), and mammoth (Mammuthus) or mastodon (Mammut).

The Sand Ridge area has similarly been occupied since at least the late Pleistocene. According to the Bureau of Land Management, Sand Ridge "has yielded artifacts spanning the entire cultural horizon in California." Historical research by William Preston suggests that European-introduced epidemics may have devastated Lake Indians as early as 1500.

At the point of European contact, three Yokuts nations inhabited the Tulare Lake area. The Wowol, to the southern margin, the Chunut to the east, and the Tachi to the north and west.

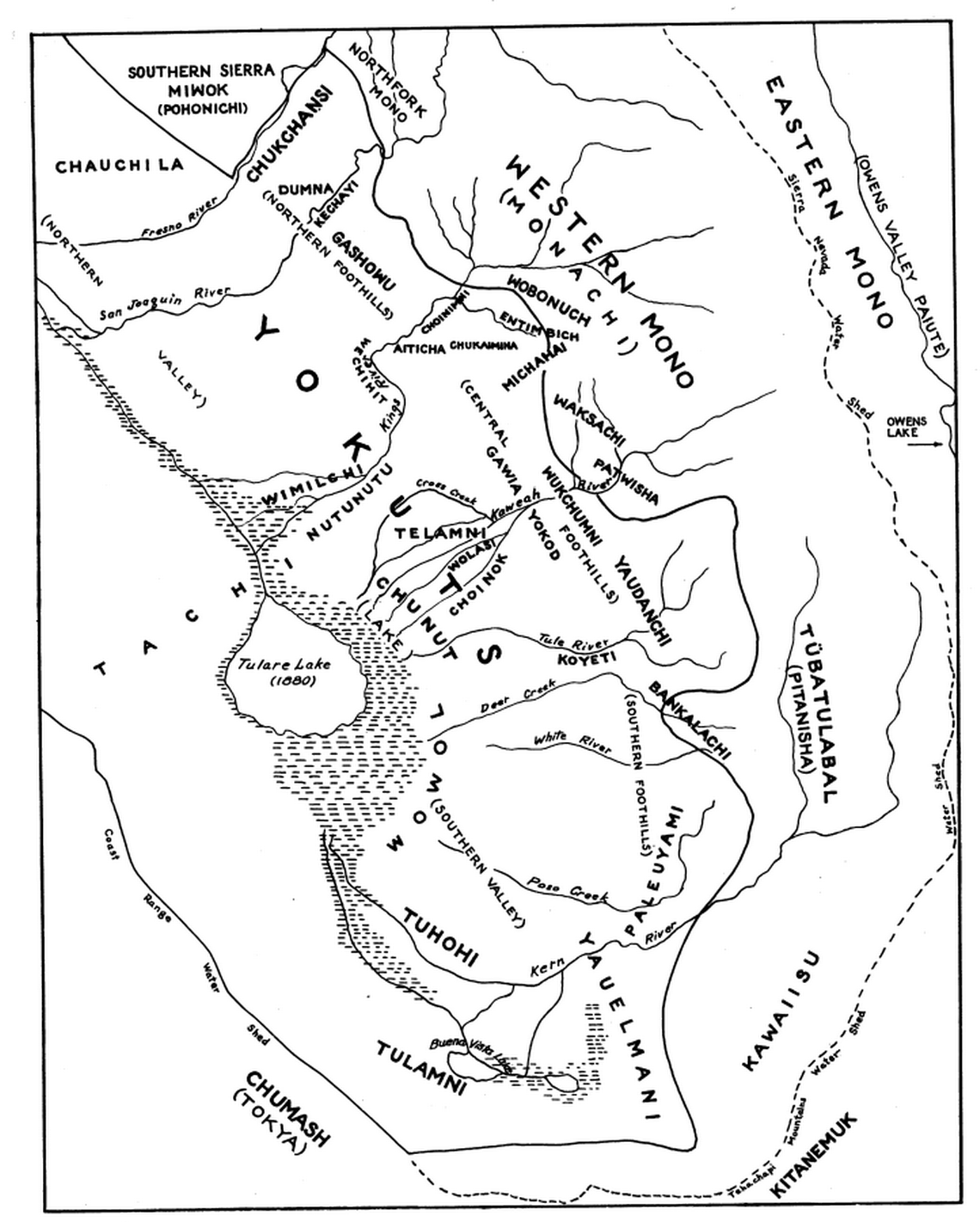
The southern San Joaquin Valley and Sierra Nevada during contact (1772), showing Tulare Lake at 1880 levels

=== Early Spanish expeditions ===
European exploration into the Tulare Basin area began in 1805 with Fr. Juan Martin, who was the first European to see the lake. He arrived in Wowol territory following a three-day trip from the coast.

In 1816, Luís Antonio Martinez destroyed the rancheria of Bubal, burning the village, scattering their grain, and smashing their grinding stones. He was heavily criticized for his cruelty by Father Juan Cabot, who was present on the expedition.

=== Pestilence of 1833 ===
According to California historian and ethnographer of the Yokuts people Frank F. Latta, there was an epidemic around 1833 that wiped out nearly the entire western San Joaquin Valley:

At least three centenarians among my Yokuts informants were children here at that time. They were able to verify the existence of such an occurrence and to give me some account of it: burial of dead bodies until there were not enough survivors to make burials; abandonment of village sites, fleeing to the mountains, and later, studying the general condition of the valley floor and foothills until the Mewalk throught [sic] them safe for reoccupation. These centenarians were Pahmit, San Joaquin River Dumna; Sáhn-ē-hat, Tule River Yaudanche, and Tō-tū-yah, Yosemite Valley Mewalk. Totuyah and Pahmit actually knew of the Mewalk moving down into the vacant Yokuts territory.

Skull Island was probably a result of this epidemic, as Latta's informants specifically note that bodies were too high in quantity for the living to bury them.

Two Mexican land grants were claimed in 1843, one between Kings River and Cross Creek, and another, Manuel Castro's Rancho Laguna de Tache on the north bank of the Kings River. John C. Frémont led a United States military expedition across California, including Tulare Lake, immediately before the Mexican-American War.

=== Indigenous removals and treaties for the Tulare valley ===
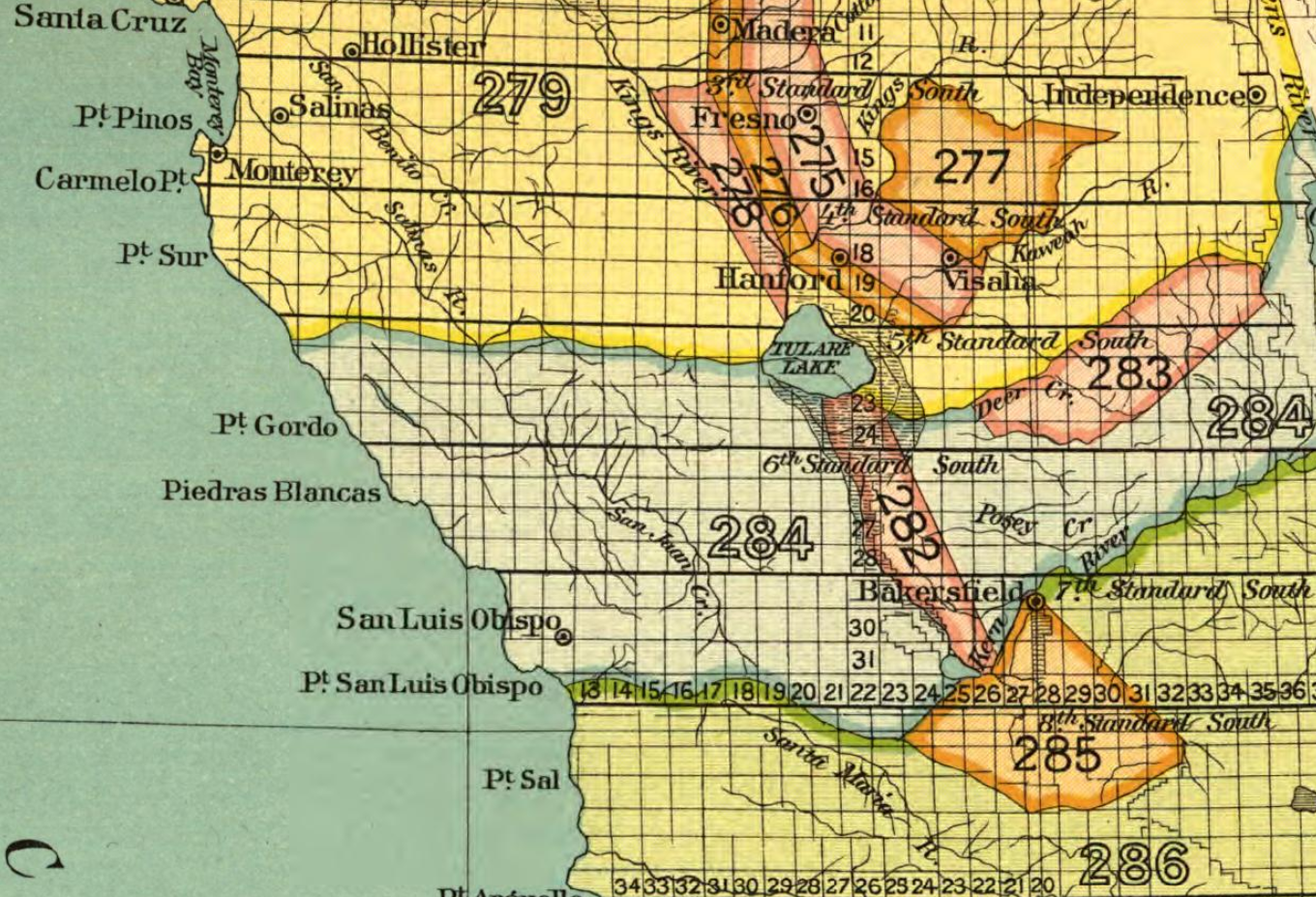
An Indian Land Cessions map showing Tulare Lake's wetlands and uplands divided by cessions 275 to 279 and 282 to 286 in 1851.

Prior to American settlement, the Tulare Lake basin and its surrounding wetlands were inhabited by numerous Indigenous nations, predominantly Yokutsan tribes, who relied on the lacustrine ecosystem for food. Following the American acquisition of California, a combination of discriminatory legislation, state-sponsored violence, and unratified treaties forced these communities to surrender their ancestral lands.

This dispossession was facilitated by the state's legal framework and systemic violence, now recognized as the California genocide. The Act for the Government and Protection of Indians (1850) stripped Native Americans of legal standing, permitted white settlers to dispossess them of occupied lands, and enabled a system of forced indentured servitude. Encroachment by settlers and state-backed militias disrupted traditional resource gathering, culminating in localized armed resistance such as the Tule River War of 1856. Military suppression and the destruction of food supplies effectively ended sovereign Indigenous control over the basin.

Between 1851 and 1873, federal commissioners negotiated a series of land cession treaties with regional tribes under duress. The 1851 agreements were part of the "Eighteen Unratified Treaties" signed by federal agents but secretly rejected by the U.S. Senate under pressure from the California legislature, leaving the tribes landless despite executing the required cessions. The schedule of formal cessions impacting the Tulare Lake basin includes:

- April 29, 1851 (Cession 275): Signed by the Howechee, Chookchanee, Chowchilla, Pohoneechee, Nukchu, Pitcatchee, Casson, Toomna, Tallinchee, Paskesa, Wachaet, Itachee, Choenemnee, Chokimena, Wemalche, and Notonoto.
- May 13, 1851 (Cession 276): Signed by the Tache, Cahwia, Yokol, Lolumne, Wicchumne, Holcuma, Toeneche, Tuhucmach, Intimpeach, Choinuck, Wemilche, and Notonoto
- May 30, 1851 (Cessions 277, 278, 279): Signed by the Koyate, Wolasi, Newchowwe, Wacksache, Palwisha, Pokenwell, and Yawilchine.
- June 3, 1851 (Cessions 282, 283, 284): Signed by the Chunute, Wowol, Yolumne, and Coyetie
- June 10, 1851 (Cessions 285, 286): Signed by the Castake, Tejon, San Imiri, Uva, Carise, Buena Vista, Senahuow, Holoclame, Sohonut, Tocia, and Holmiuk
- September 1, 1853 (Cession 311): Signed by the Tejon, Castake, and San Imirio.
- November 19, 1859 (Cession 423): Signed by the Chowchilla, Phoneche, and Chukchansi.
- October 3, 1873 (Cession 547): Signed by the Tule River, King's River, and Owen's River groups.

=== American settlers ===
United States settlers began entering the Tulare Basin in 1826. The first settler to enter the San Joaquin Valley was Jedediah Smith.

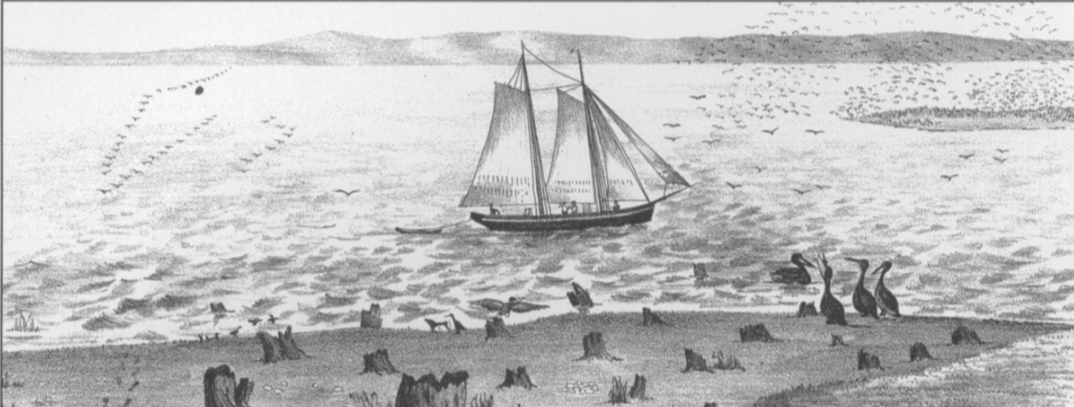
Drawing of the schooner Water Witch on Tulare Lake, 1883

In 1854, Grizzly Adams hunted on Pelican Island, "where there was said to be elk in abundance." Children from a village on the mouth of the Kings River guided him to the island on a canoe made of tules. In 1858 or 1859, settlers began ethnically cleansing Tulare Lake, by killing or forcibly relocating the majority of the Yokuts population. Severe floods in 1861 and 1867 killed thousands of cattle and caused settlers to request further dams on the inflows to Tulare Lake. From 1875 to 1877, large numbers of hogs and cattle were carried to Skull Island from the mainland on the Mose Andross.

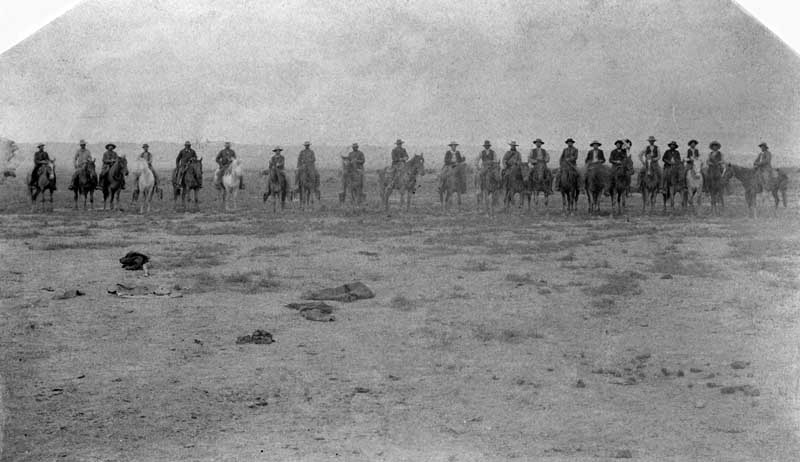
Cowboys on the north side of the Tulare Lake, 1884

Presumably the last autonomous Indigenous people lived at the Tulare Lake archipelago in the 1870s. Yoimut detailed white settlers introducing cattle to the island and subsequently forcing the indigenous people out:

While we were at Chawlowin some white men put cattle on the island. The water was low and they drove them across from the east. There were hogs there already, but they were wild. As soon as the white people found out we were there we began to have trouble. The tules were getting dry and we were afraid the white people would burn us out. So we all left. My mother and stepfather took us to Téjon Ranch. We went in his brother's little wagon.

=== Desiccation ===
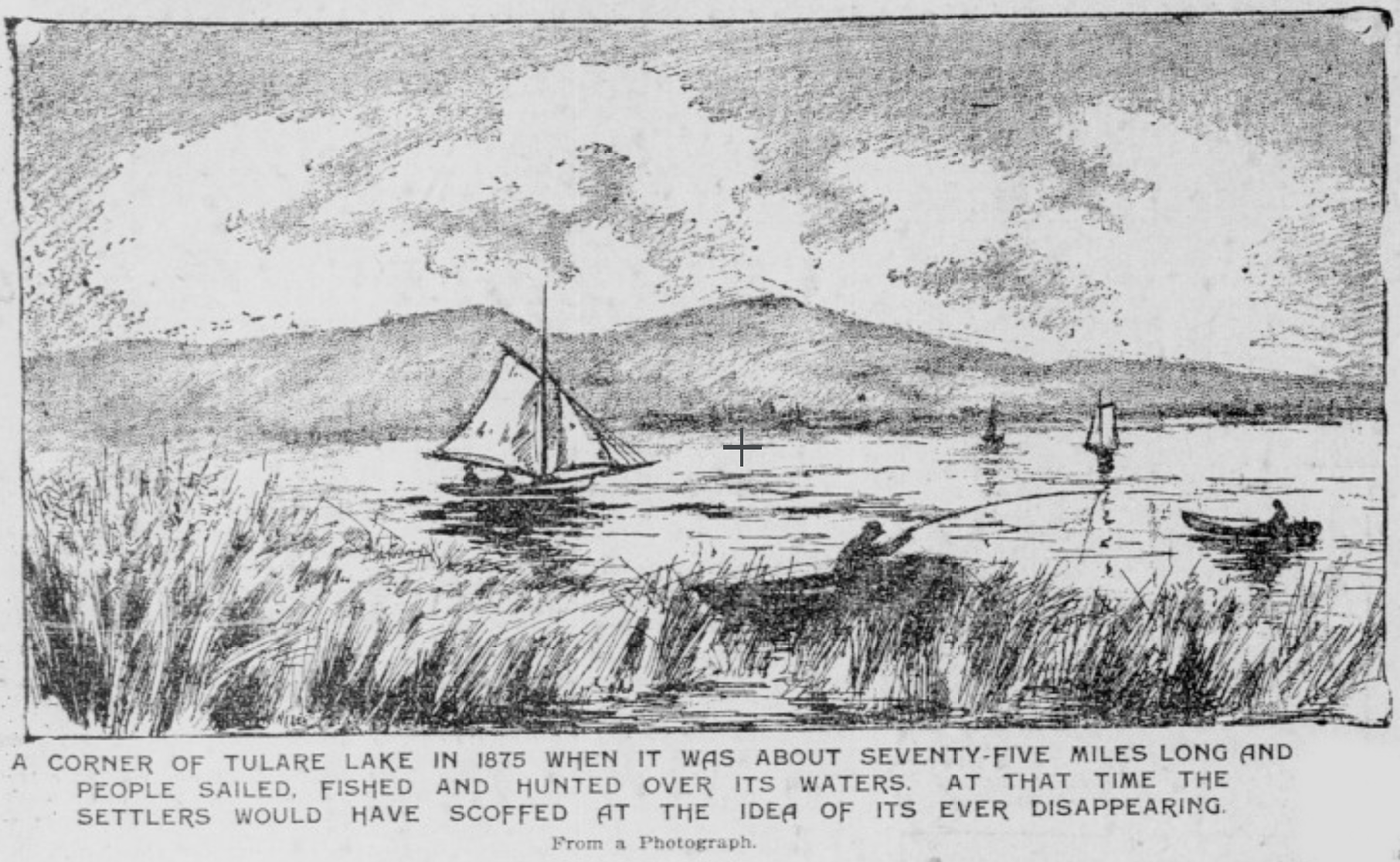
Drawing of a photograph of Tulare Lake from 1875

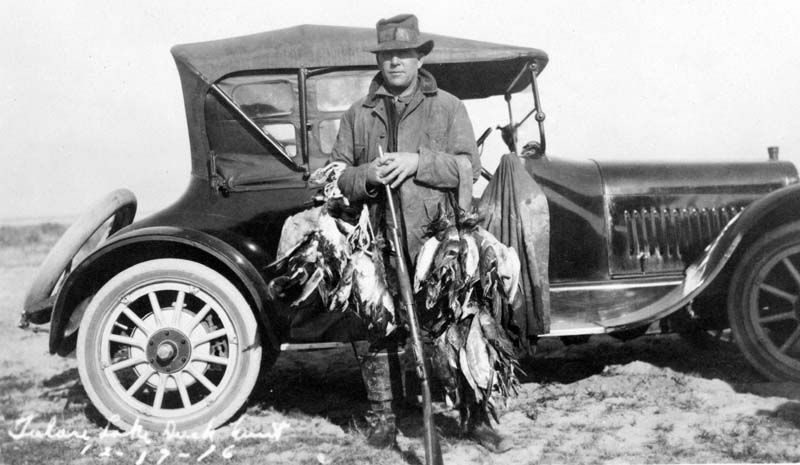
Dr. Mountford shown after a duck hunt on Tulare Lake, 1916

In the wake of the United States Civil War, late 19th-century settlers drained the surrounding marshes for agriculture. In 1884, Scottish travel writer Constance Gordon-Cumming warned that "[e]ven the great Tulare lake itself is in danger of being gradually absorbed by the numerous canals and ditches with which the whole country is now being intersected...[t]he poor lakes have simply been left to starve—the rivers, whose surplus waters hitherto fed them, having now been bridled and led away in ditches and canals to feed the great wheat-fields."

That same year, Scientific American predicted the "utter absorption" of Tulare Lake. The Kaweah, Kern, Kings, and Tule Rivers were dammed upstream in the Sierra Nevada Mountains, which turned their headwaters into a system of reservoirs. In the San Joaquin Valley, the state and counties built canals to deliver that water and divert the remaining flows for agricultural irrigation and municipal water uses. Tulare Lake was nearly dry by the early 20th century.

Citing health benefits of the day, Swedish naturalist Gustav Eisen, who crossed the lake by steamboat in 1878 and undertook an excavation of Sand Ridge probably that same year, celebrated the desiccation. He wrote,

In my opinion the drying up of Tulare Lake is a good thing. The land will be good for crops and there will be less sickness in the vicinity. The sloughs and marsh land in the old days used to be full of malaria that will now be a thing of the past.

Skull Island, surrounded by wheat fields, was eventually raided by grave robbers.

=== Post-1930 ===
Enough water remained that the Alameda Naval Air Station used Tulare Lake as an outlying base for flying boats during World War II and the early years of the Cold War. Aircraft needing a place to land could put down on Tulare Lake when landing conditions were unsafe on San Francisco Bay.

The lake bed became a shallow basin of fertile soil, within the Central Valley of California, the most productive agricultural region of the United States. Farms in the basin produce much of the country's cotton, tomatoes, pistachios, almonds, walnuts, alfalfa, wheat, barley and milk. Farmers have irrigated the area for a century, so soil salination is becoming a concern. The destruction of the terrestrial wetlands and the lake ecosystem habitats resulted in substantial losses of terrestrial animals, plants, aquatic animals, water plants, and resident and migrating birds.

=== Resurgence ===
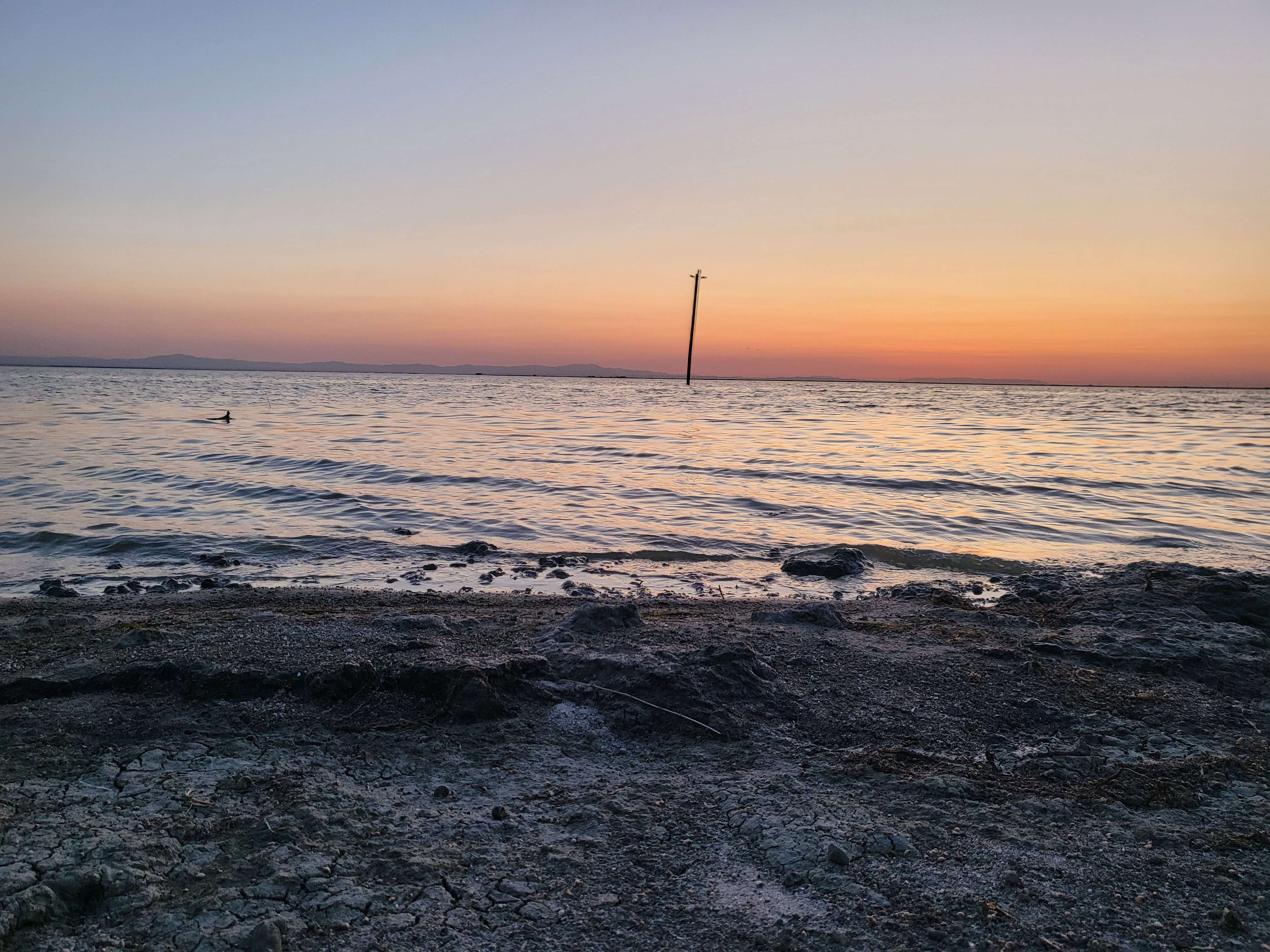
Part of the revenant Tulare Lake near Alpaugh

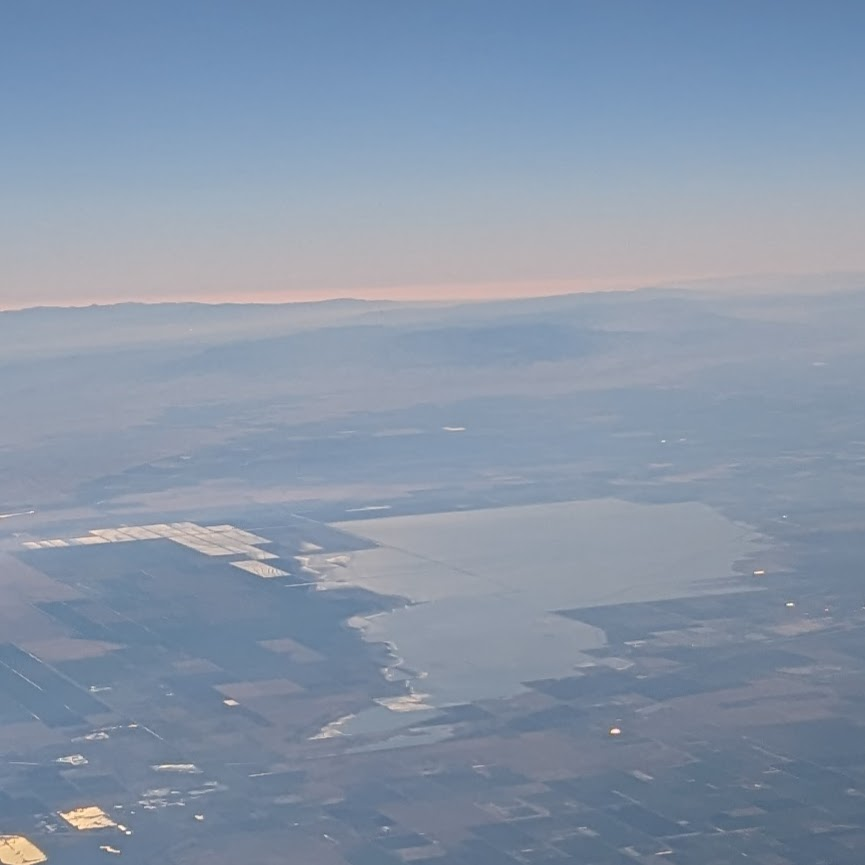
Aerial image of Tulare Lake in July 2023

Yoimut, who spent a significant part of her life on the lake, warned ethnographer Frank F. Latta that the lake would return. In 1938 and 1955, the lake flooded, which prompted the construction of the Terminus and Success Dams on the Kaweah and Tule Rivers in Tulare County and Pine Flat Dam on the Kings River in Fresno County. Although usually dry, the lake reappears during floods following unusually high levels of rainfall or snow melt; for this reason, it has been called a "phantom lake," "the lake that will not die," or California's zombie lake. Estimates have found that Tulare Lake could hold twice the water of the proposed Temperance Flat Dam at one-fifth the cost. The Tachi Yokuts and many other people and organizations are trying to restore the lake permanently for various reasons including environmental purposes, water storage and Native American land reclaiming.

The lake reappeared in 1942, 1969, 1983, 1997, 1998, and 2023. In 1983, the lake took two years to dry out. In June 1998, an above-normal winter snowfall led to the lake reappearing, reaching a size of 20,000 acres (81 km^{2}), which resulted in about $100 million worth of crop damage and losses.

The groundwater in recent years has been overpumped by the large land owners that dominate the politics and economy of the Tulare Lake region. The overpumping has contributed to the sinking of the ground under Corcoran, as well as exacerbated the dangers of flooding and necessitated the construction of multimillion-dollar levees.

=== 2023 resurgence ===
The numerous storms that struck California during the first few months of 2023 resulted in the reappearance of over 114,000 acres (46,000 ha) of the lake, forcing the evacuation of several communities and causing the flooding of hundreds of farm buildings and homes amidst the land farmed by agricultural operations on the former lakebed. Parts of the communities of Alpaugh and Allensworth were under evacuation orders due to concerns that they might become flooded. Some floodwaters were diverted to alleviate flooding on farms. The Kern National Wildlife Refuge received its full water allocation in 2023. Located about 4 miles (6.4 km) south, the wetlands provide habitat for birds as part of the Pacific Flyway. As of February 1, 2024, the water only covered 4,532 acres of farmland.

== In mass media ==
In 1967, a documentary film about the J. G. Boswell Company's achievements and variety of California's agricultural industry titled The Big Land directed by David H. Vowell was released.

TV personality Huell Howser visited Tulare Lake in an episode of his show, California's Gold, in 1999.

In 2003, author Mark Arax published a book titled The King of California which is about how J. G. Boswell turned the lakebed into farms and revolutionized the farming industry.

In 2015, a documentary titled Tulare, the Phantom Lake: Drought was released and in 2022, a second part to the same documentary was released. Both were directed and produced by Christopher Beaver.

== See also ==
- List of lakes of California
- Rancho Laguna de Tache (Limantour)
- San Luis National Wildlife Refuge
- Kesterson National Wildlife Refuge
- Great Valley Grasslands State Park
- Turlock Basin
- Mussel Slough Tragedy
- List of drying lakes
- Lake Poopó
- Great Black Swamp
- Limberlost Swamp
- Grand Kankakee Marsh
- Beaver Lake (Newton County, Indiana)

== Sources ==
- Dale, Harrison Clifford (1918). The Ashley-Smith Explorations and the Discovery of a Central Route to the Pacific, 1822–1829. Arthur H. Clark Company. pp. 210–211.
- Fleeman y Garcia, Trace (2022). "An Archae/pelago in the Valley: On Cultural Landscapes of the Southern Tulare Basin" (PDF). Proceedings of the Society for California Archaeology. Vol. 35. Society for California Archaeology. pp. 180–186.
- Latta, Frank F. (1999). Handbook of Yokuts Indians (2nd ed.). Coyote Press. ISBN 1-892622-09-2.
- Menefee, Eugene L.; Dodge, Fred A. (1883). History of Tulare County California, with Illustrations, Descriptive of its scenery, farms, residences, public buildings, factories, hotels, business houses, schools, churches, and mines, from original drawings, with biographical sketches. Wallace W. Elliott & Co, Publishers.
- Preston, William L. (1981). Vanishing Landscapes. Berkeley: University of California Press. pp. 1–243.
