= Kern Lake =

Former lake in the Tulare Basin of California

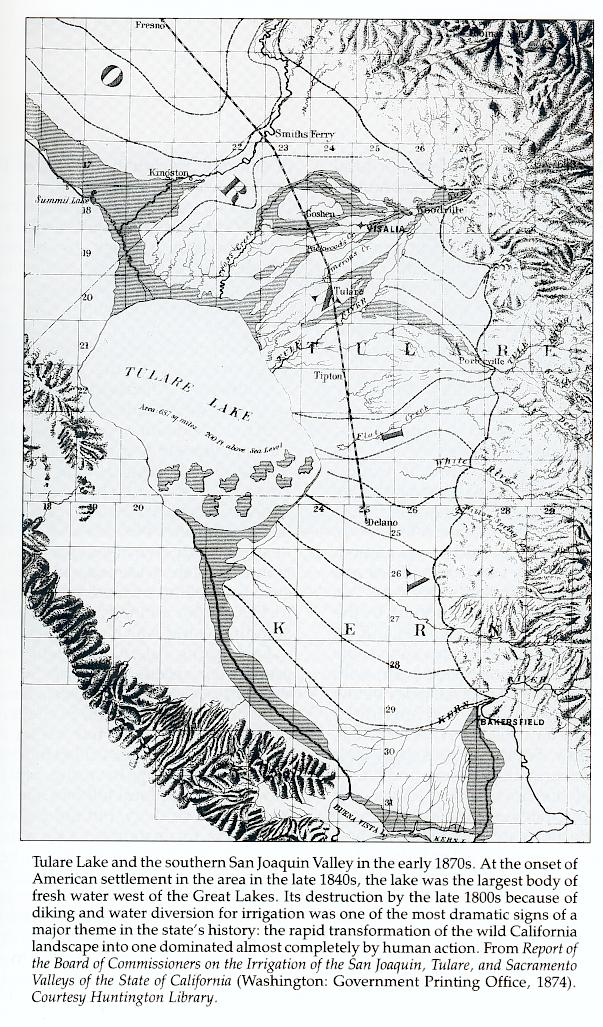

- Location within California Location within the United States
- Location: San Joaquin Valley; Kern County, California
- Coordinates: 35.122188°N 119.056216°W
- Lake type: Flat
- Primary inflows: Kern River
- Basin countries: United States
- Surface elevation: 282 ft (86 m)
- References: U.S. Geological Survey Geographic Names Information System: Kern Lake Bed

Kern Lake was the smallest of the three large lakes in the Tulare Basin, in the southwestern San Joaquin Valley of California.

It was the first of the lakes fed by the Kern River. Kern Lake is now a dry lake bed, due to agricultural diversion of the Kern River waters and the aquifer in the 1800s.

== See also ==
- Lake Isabella, modern lake of Kern River
- Buena Vista Lake
- List of lakes of California
- Tulare Lake
