= McKinley Grove =

Giant sequoia grove in Fresno County, California, United States

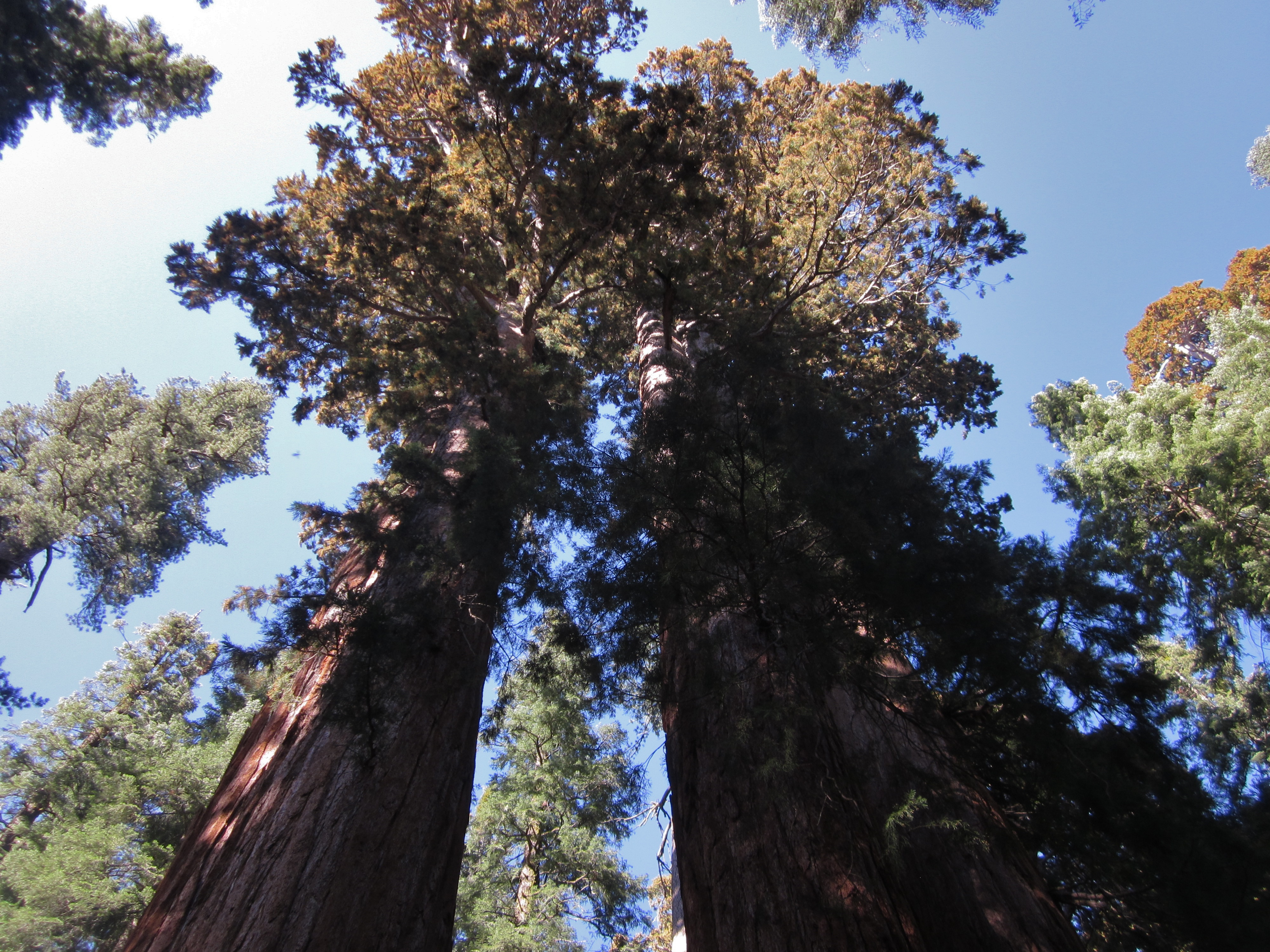
- McKinley Grove

- Location within California
- Interactive map of McKinley Grove

Geography
- Location: Fresno County, California, United States
- Coordinates: 37°01′N 119°06′W
- Elevation: 6,316 ft (1,925 m)

Ecology
- Dominant tree species: Sequoiadendron giganteum

McKinley Grove is a small, isolated giant sequoia grove located about 12 km (7.5 mi) southeast of Dinkey Creek in the Kings River watershed of Sierra National Forest, California. The grove occupies a small bowl-shaped depression at an elevation of 1,925 m (6,316 ft).

The grove hosts between 150 and 200 large trees. Parts of the grove were logged in the 1880s, though the heart of the grove remains largely untouched. A short paved path winds through a cluster of about 20 giant sequoias with an open understory of dogwood resembling that of the Giant Forest grove of Sequoia National Park. The grove also features a large fallen giant sequoia.

== History ==
The grove was originally called "Washington Grove" after the 1st president of the United States, George Washington. The grove was later named Dusy Grove, after a colorful local settler. Later, the grove was named after the 25th president, William McKinley.

In August 1982 Earthfirst! organized a protest of a logging permit and damming of Dinky Creek.

In September 2025, the lightning-sparked Garnet Fire burned through the McKinley Grove, threatening the grove of giant Sequoias. Wildland firefighters and smokejumpers worked to protect as many trees as possible, including fighting fires in the canopies of the trees. With the fire 99% contained in late September, officials noted most giant Sequoias survived the blaze, though many younger trees did not make it. Official damage to the grove would not be known for six months to a year after the fire.

== See also ==
- List of giant sequoia groves
- Courtright Reservoir
- Dinkey Lakes Wilderness
- John Muir Wilderness
