= Kings River (California) =

River in central California, US

Kings River Spanish: Río de los Santos Reyes
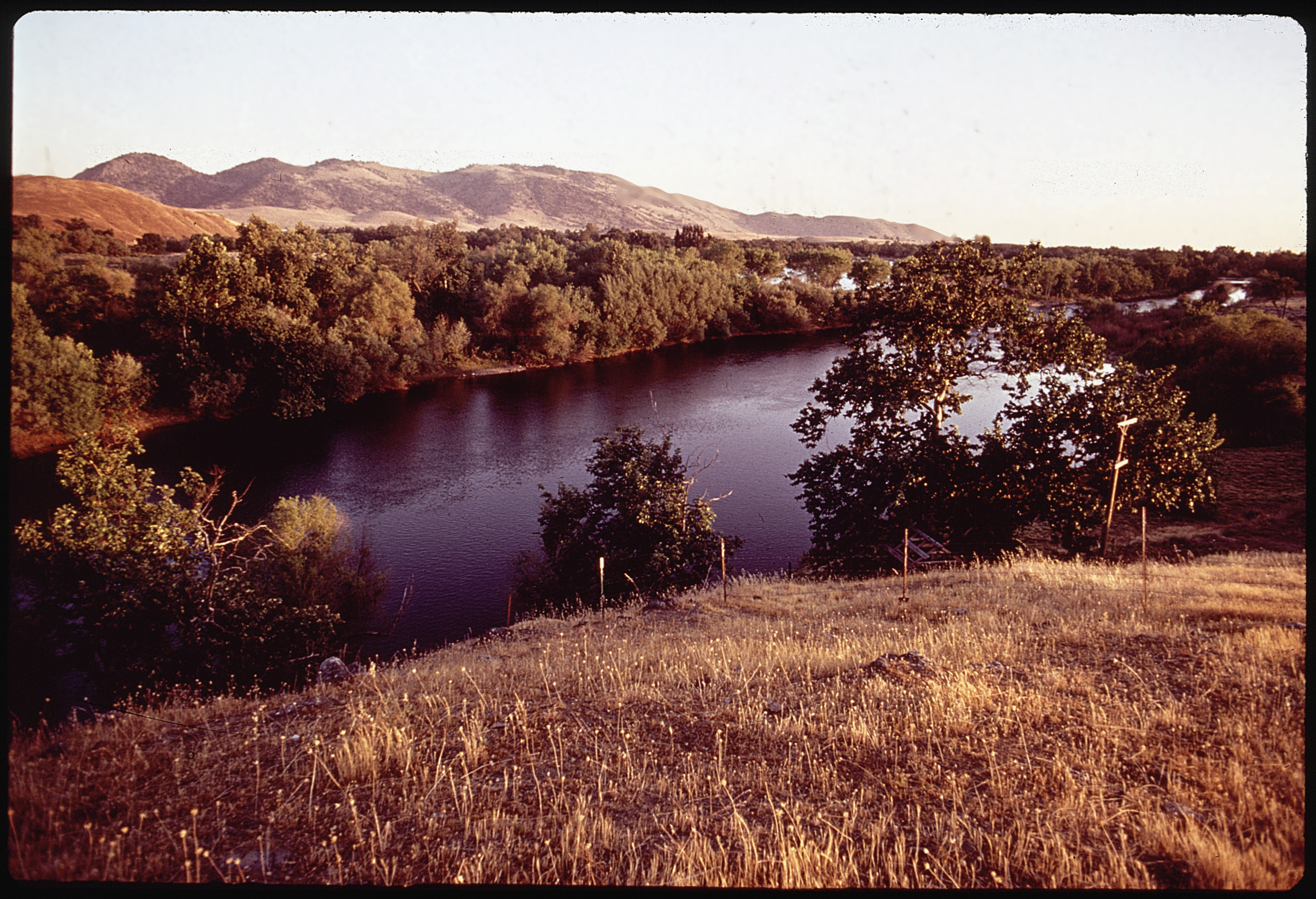
- The Kings River in the San Joaquin Valley about 10 miles (16 km) below Pine Flat Dam

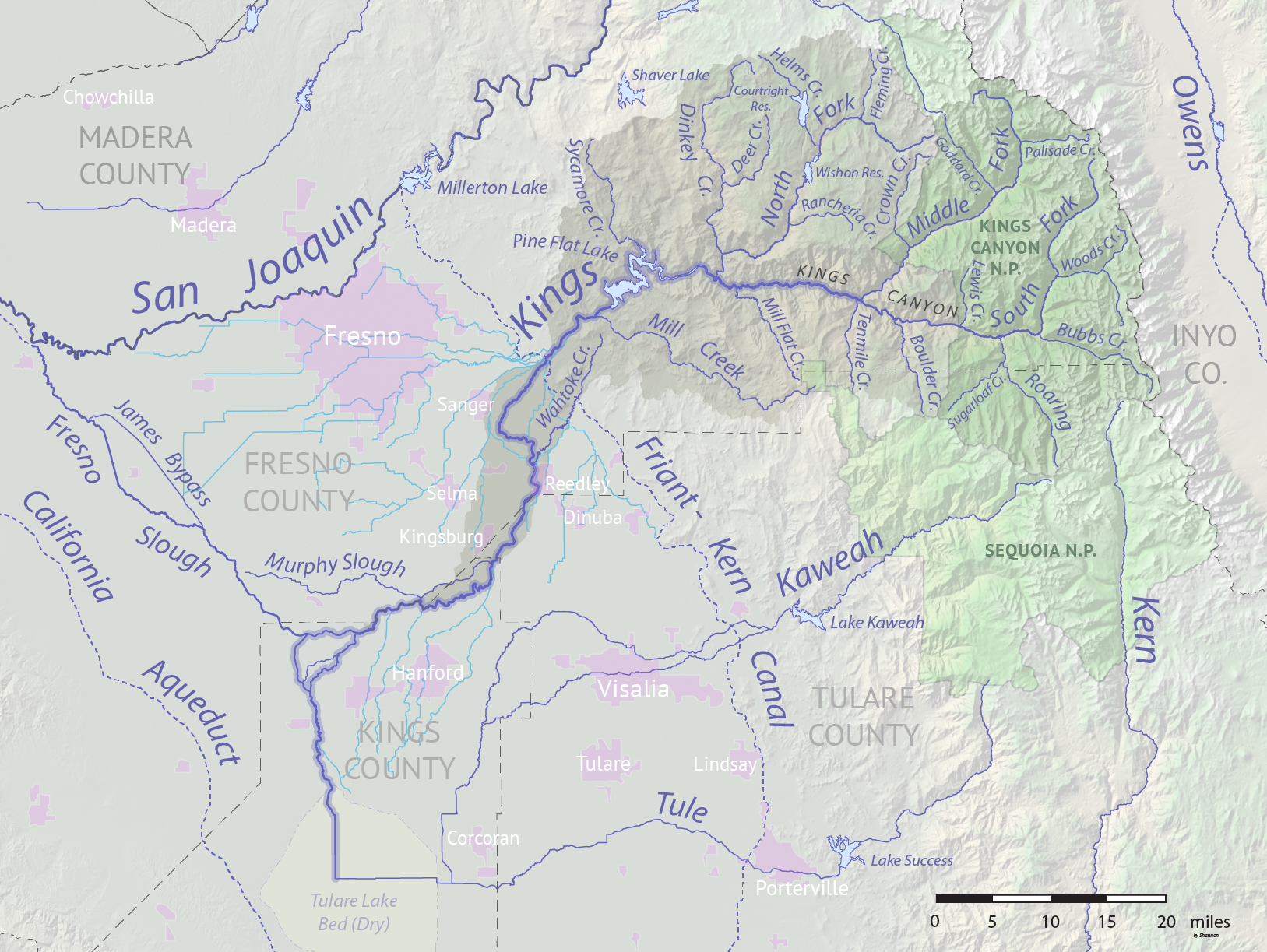
- Map showing the Kings River and its tributaries. The canal system fed by Kings River is shown in light blue.

- Location of the mouth of the Kings River in California
- Native name: Wimmel-che (Yokuts)

Location
- Country: United States
- State: California
- Region: Kings Canyon National Park, Fresno County, California, Kings County, California

Physical characteristics
- Source: Confluence of Middle and South Forks
  - location: Sierra Nevada
  - coordinates: 36°50′17″N 118°52′29″W
  - elevation: 2,257 ft (688 m)
- Mouth: Tulare Lakebed
  - location: San Joaquin Valley
  - coordinates: 36°03′00″N 119°49′28″W
  - elevation: 184 ft (56 m)
- Length: 132.9 mi (213.9 km)
- Basin size: 1,544 sq mi (4,000 km^{2})
- Discharge
  - location: Piedra, California
  - average: 2,287 cu ft/s (64.8 m^{3}/s)
  - minimum: 20.1 cu ft/s (0.57 m^{3}/s)
  - maximum: 91,000 cu ft/s (2,600 m^{3}/s)

Basin features
- Tributaries
  - left: South Fork Kings River, Mill Creek
  - right: Middle Fork Kings River, North Fork Kings River

National Wild and Scenic River
- Type: Wild
- Designated: November 3, 1987

The Kings River (Spanish: Río de los Santos Reyes) is a 132.9-mile (213.9 km) river draining the Sierra Nevada mountain range in central California in the United States. Its headwaters originate along the Sierra Crest in and around Kings Canyon National Park and form Kings Canyon, one of the deepest river gorges in North America. The river is impounded in Pine Flat Lake before flowing into the San Joaquin Valley (the southern half of the Central Valley) southeast of Fresno. With its upper and middle course in Fresno County, the Kings River diverges into multiple branches in Kings County, with some water flowing south to the old Tulare Lake bed and the rest flowing north to the San Joaquin River. However, most of the water is consumed for irrigation well upstream of either point.

Inhabited for thousands of years by the Yokuts and other native groups, the Kings River basin once fed a vast network of seasonal wetlands around Tulare Lake that supported millions of waterfowl, fish, and game animals, in turn providing sustenance for indigenous peoples. Tulare Lake was once the largest freshwater lake in the western U.S., at the middle of an endorheic basin also fed by the Kaweah, Tule and Kern Rivers. The river was named by Gabriel Moraga, the commander of a Spanish military expedition in 1806, but it was not until California became a U.S. state in 1850 that many Europeans arrived and settled along the Kings River, driving out the area's original inhabitants. Logging and livestock grazing inflicted significant environmental damage on the upper parts of the river system, before the federal government moved to establish national parks and preserves there.

The Kings has a long history of water development, going back to the mid-19th century when farmers made their first attempts to irrigate with Kings River water. In the early 1900s Tulare Lake and its surrounding wetlands were diked, drained and reclaimed for agriculture; the construction of Pine Flat Dam in the 1950s tamed the river's seasonal floods. The battle for control over Kings River water produced extended conflicts, including a set of dams proposed in what would become Kings Canyon National Park. Today, the river irrigates about 1.1 million acres (4,500 km^{2}) of some of the most productive farmland in the country, and is also used extensively for hydropower generation, and water-based and backcountry recreation.

== Course ==
All three forks of the Kings River originate as snowmelt in the high Sierra Nevada mountains. The Middle and South Forks begin in Kings Canyon National Park, and join in the Monarch Wilderness (Sierra and Sequoia National Forests) to form the Kings River. The North Fork, which begins in the John Muir Wilderness of the Sierra National Forest, joins the Kings River further downstream near Pine Flat Lake, the only major reservoir on the river. Much of the upper Kings River consists of remote backcountry and wilderness areas, accessible only by non-motorized trails. The entire upper course of the Kings River is in Fresno County; in the Central Valley, the Kings River also flows through parts of Tulare County and Kings County.

=== Headwaters ===
The 44-mile (71 km) South Fork is the longest tributary of the Kings River, originating on the Sierra Crest at the far eastern edge of Kings Canyon National Park. It flows south, then flows west through the Cedar Grove section of Kings Canyon, a glacial valley with high granite cliffs and a meadow floor which has been compared in appearance to Yosemite Valley.

The Middle Fork flows for 37 miles (60 km) through some of the park's most difficult-to-access backcountry, including Simpson Meadow and Tehipite Valley. The South and Middle Forks converge in the Monarch Wilderness at an elevation of 2,257 feet (688 m) just outside the national park to form the Kings River in the deepest part of Kings Canyon. With 10,051-foot (3,064 m) Spanish Peak towering above the north side of the river, and summits as high as 8,400 feet (2,600 m) on the south side, Kings Canyon is both deeper and narrower than the Grand Canyon.

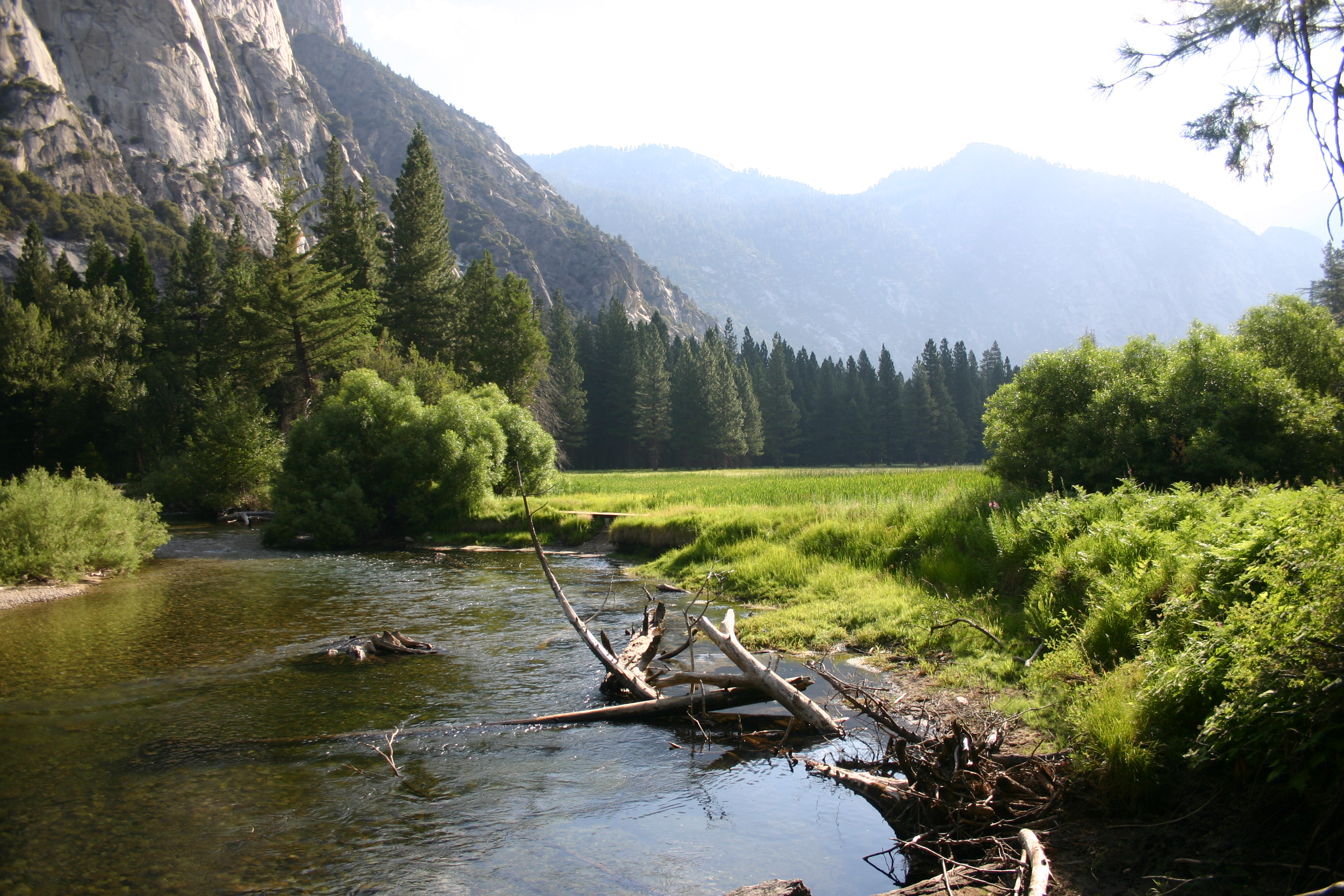
The South Fork Kings River at Zumwalt Meadow

Below the confluence of the Middle and South Forks, the Kings River flows swiftly westward for about 30 miles (48 km), carving a canyon more than 5,000 feet (1,500 m) deep in places. Major tributaries of the Kings River in this section include Tenmile and Mill Flat Creeks, both from the south; a dam on Tenmile Creek creates Hume Lake. Another notable feature along this area of the Kings Canyon is Garlic Falls, a tiered waterfall on a tributary of the Kings more than 800 feet (240 m) in height. The canyon is roadless as far as the Upper Kings Campground near Verplank Creek; below the campground the river is followed by Trimmer Springs Road.

The Kings River passes Rodgers Crossing and receives the North Fork from the right near Balch Camp. The North Fork is about 40 miles (64 km) long and flows mainly through the Sierra National Forest. It is dammed at Wishon Reservoir, which serves as the lower reservoir for the Helms Pumped Storage Plant, one of the biggest pumped-storage hydroelectric plants in California. The North Fork passes through several other hydro plants before it joins with the Kings River. The main Kings then flows into Pine Flat Lake, the large reservoir created by Pine Flat Dam, which can store up to 1,000,000 acre-feet (1.2 km^{3}) of water. Constructed in 1954, Pine Flat Dam provides flood control, irrigation and hydroelectricity for the southern San Joaquin Valley.

=== Lower river ===
The Kings River emerges from the foothills of the Sierra Nevada near Piedra, about 10 miles (16 km) downstream of Pine Flat Dam. From there it flows across the gently sloping alluvial plain of the San Joaquin Valley, which today is one of the most productive agricultural regions of the United States. Here the Kings River encounters a large number of diversions that serve both irrigation and flood control purposes. Two key irrigation structures along the lower river are the Fresno Weir and People's Weir; both divert a substantial part of the river's flow into canals. The Kings River flows south-southwest past Sanger and Reedley, crossing briefly into northwest Tulare County before entering Kings County. At Kingsburg Cole Slough splits off to the northwest, rejoining the main stem about 10 miles (16 km) downstream at Laton.

About 6 miles (9.7 km) north of Lemoore the Kings River splits into a pair of distributaries, the North Fork and the South Fork (not to be confused with the North and South Forks upstream in the Sierra Nevada). The Army Weir controls the amount of water flowing into the South Fork and North Fork's flow is controlled by Island Weir, which is adjacent to Army Weir. Fresno Slough diverges from the North Fork and flows northwest, seasonally carrying floodwaters from the Kings River to the San Joaquin River at Mendota. This is the only branch of the Kings River to reach the San Joaquin, and consequently the Pacific Ocean. The remainder of the North Fork turns south below Fresno Slough, rejoining the South Fork west of Lemoore. There is also a smaller distributary called Clark's Fork which splits from the South Fork and enters the North Fork just above where all the forks re-join.

From there the Kings River flows due south through Kings County, past Stratford, and approaches the old Tulare Lake bed. The river terminates about 10 miles (16 km) northeast of Kettleman City at a junction with a canal carrying water from the Tule River. Today, the 44,000-acre (18,000 ha) old lake bed is used for agriculture and diked to prevent flooding; floodwaters are pumped into about 4,700 acres (1,900 ha) of evaporation basins. In most years, the dams on the Kings and other rivers flowing into Tulare Lake, and the extensive canal diversion system surrounding the lake, are sufficient to prevent flooding. However, the lake occasionally reforms in very wet years.

== Watershed and natural characteristics ==
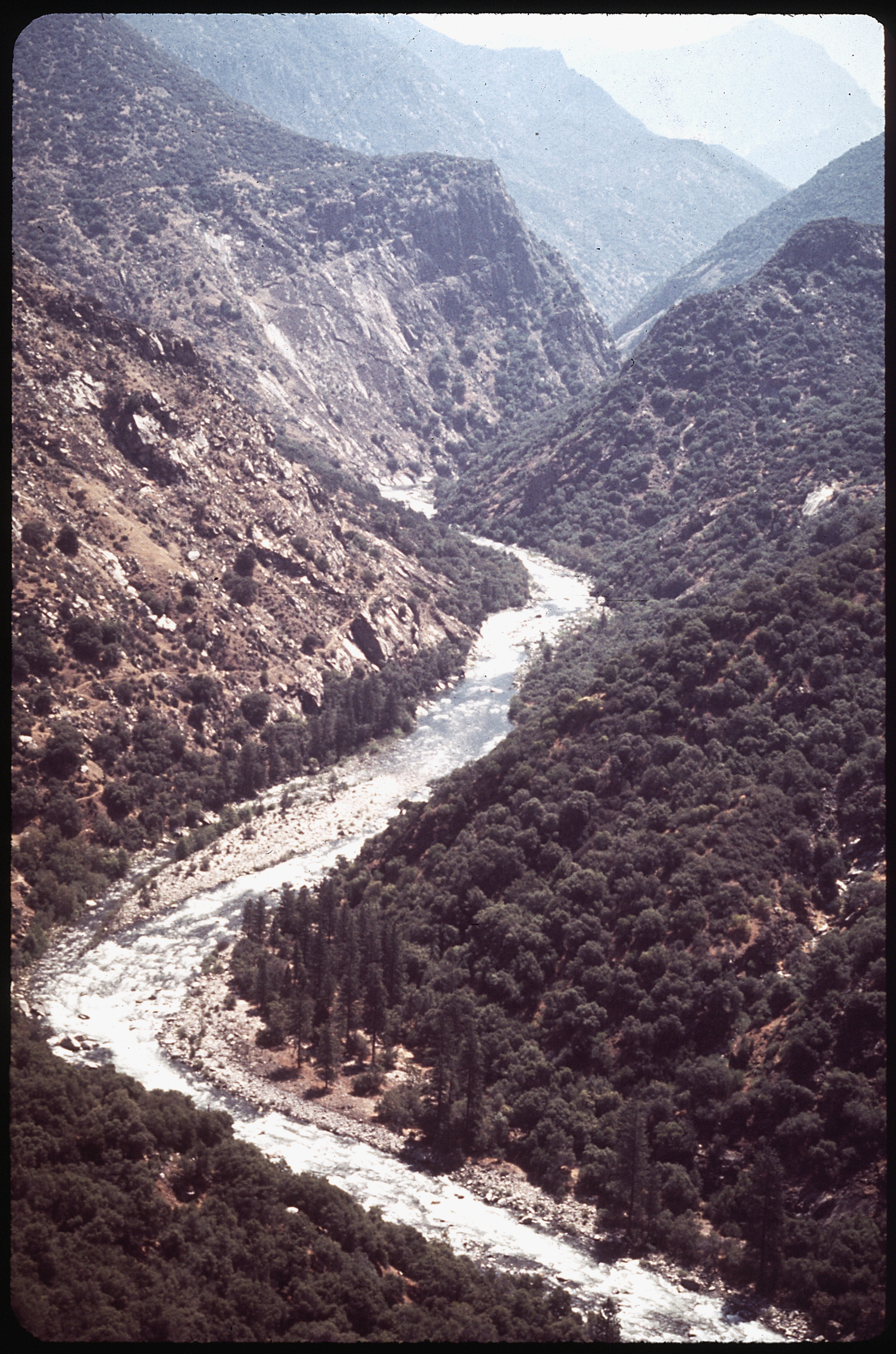
The Kings River canyon above Pine Flat Lake

The Kings River is the largest river draining the southern Sierra Nevada. Its average annual flow of 1,791,000 acre-feet (2.209 km^{3}) makes it larger than the Kern, Kaweah and Tule Rivers combined. Before the construction of Pine Flat Dam in 1954, the Kings River reached monthly averages as high as 12,000 to 14,000 cubic feet per second (340 to 400 m^{3}/s) in May and June where it flows into the San Joaquin Valley, and averaged as low as 100 to 200 cubic feet per second (2.8 to 5.7 m^{3}/s) in the driest months of September and October. After the dam was built, late spring-early summer high flows have been reduced, and late summer-autumn flows have greatly increased.

In the winter season of mid-November through April, rainstorms at lower elevations commonly flood the Kings River, although with less volume than the summer melt. Annual precipitation can be as high as 20 to 50 inches (510 to 1,270 mm) in the Sierra; however, in the San Joaquin Valley the climate is semi-arid to arid with annual precipitation of 5 to 12 inches (130 to 300 mm), decreasing as one moves further west.

The majority of the runoff, about 71 percent, originates as snowmelt between April and July in the 1,544-square-mile (4,000 km^{2}) drainage basin above Pine Flat Dam. Three-quarters of this rugged watershed is a mile (1,600 m) or more above sea level; the watershed tops out at 14,248-foot (4,343 m) North Palisade, the highest point in Kings Canyon National Park. The canyons of the Kings River are relatively young in geological terms; mostly carved during the Pliocene and Pleistocene (5 million–12,000 years ago) during periods of rapid uplift in the Sierra Nevada.

During and before the Pleistocene, the upper portion of the watershed was heavily glaciated during successive ice ages, with valley glaciers flowing as much as 40 miles (64 km) down the river's three forks, carving the V-shaped river canyons into the U-shaped gorges of Kings Canyon, Tehipite Valley and others. The Sierra is composed mainly of granitic igneous rock; however, in the foothill area the Kings River flows through roof pendant formations of older sedimentary and metamorphic rock which were accreted to the Sierra Nevada crustal block as it rose above the surrounding landscape.

The lower Kings River forms a large and gently sloping inland delta, or alluvial fan, extending laterally across the Central Valley – the resulting material from millions of years of erosion that carved Kings Canyon. The alluvial fan raised the elevation of the valley floor and blocked water flowing northward into the San Joaquin River, essentially creating a large bowl in the southern part of the valley, forming the Tulare Lake basin. Soils on the alluvial slope are generally sandy, permeable and fertile, creating ideal conditions for farming; in lower elevations and old lake beds the soil is more alkaline and less fertile.

Before people began building levees and dikes in the 19th century to contain flooding, the Kings River experienced frequent channel avulsion during high flow events, sometimes flowing north into the San Joaquin River via various sloughs, at other times south into Tulare Lake, and often into both. Historically, the river had a wide floodplain characterized by a system of vernal pools, oxbow lakes, and seasonal channels and marshes that supported a dense riparian habitat. The overflow area began near present-day Kingsburg and continued from there south to Tulare Lake.

In extremely wet years, Tulare Lake could fill to such an extent that it backed up the lower Kings River and overflowed through Fresno Slough into the San Joaquin River. All this intermittent flooding over thousands of years built up the valley's huge groundwater reserves, which today are a vital water source for agriculture. The Kings Subbasin aquifer, as defined by the California Department of Water Resources, contained in 1961 a total of 93 million acre-feet (115 km^{3}), a level that has since been gradually declining due to intensive pumping for irrigation.

Since the beginning of the 21st century, the Kings River basin has experienced an increased number of dry years and particularly high temperatures in Kings Canyon National Park. The 2014–2015 water year was the driest for the Kings basin since official records began in 1895. Climate change is projected to significantly decrease the flow of the river by 2100. According to a 2014 study by UC Merced and UC Irvine researchers, average river flow could drop as much as 26 percent, due to warming temperatures causing increased plant growth in high elevations of the Sierra with a corresponding increase in evapotranspiration. The amount of available water in summer could also decrease due to more precipitation falling as rain in winter, rather than being stored in snowpack.

== Ecology ==
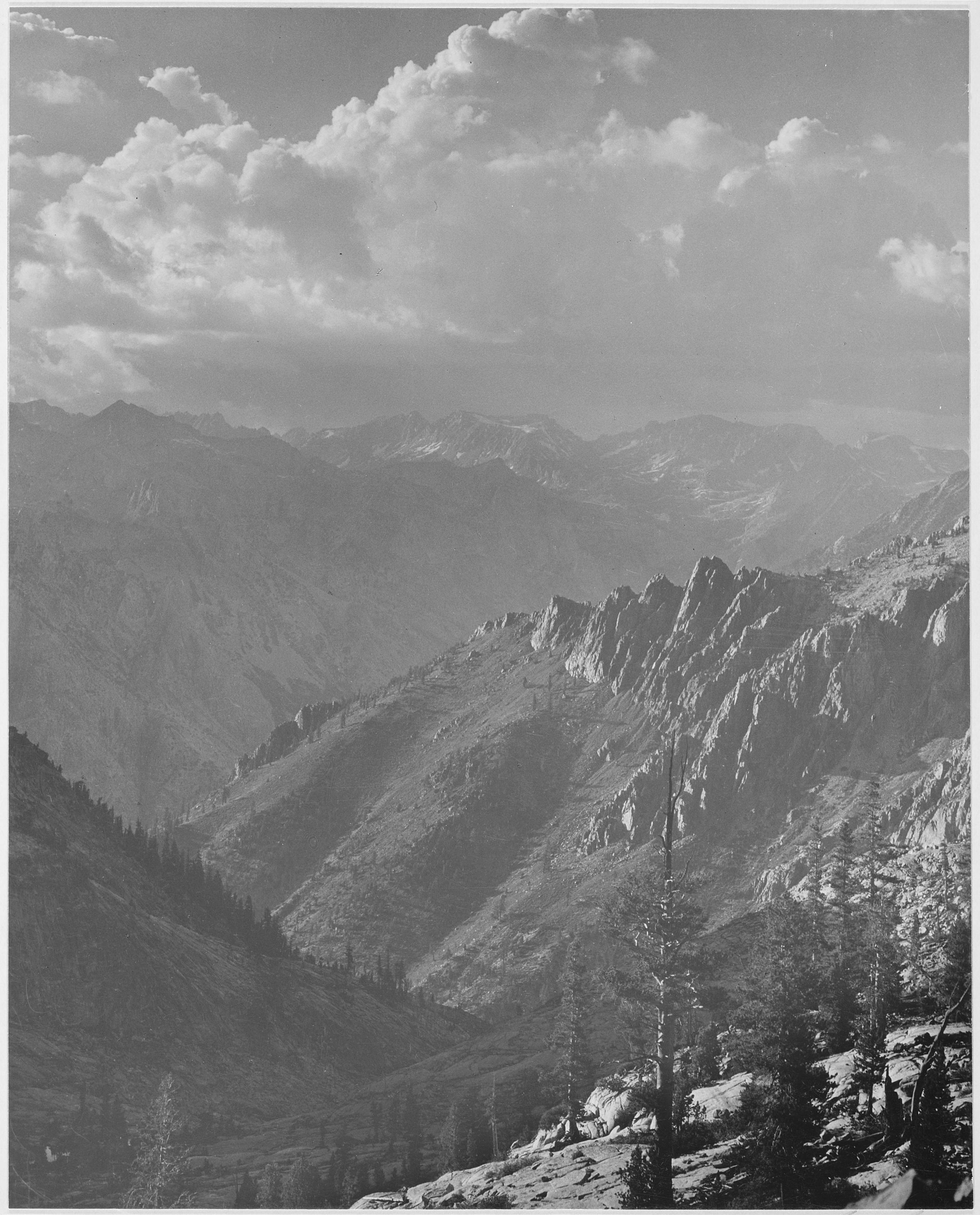
A photograph taken by Ansel Adams of the Middle Fork from the south fork of Cartridge Creek

Although most of the original wetlands and riparian zones in the valley have been lost to development, narrow riparian corridors still exist along 40 miles (64 km) of the Kings River between Pine Flat Dam and People's Weir (below Highway 99), and in other places such as lower Fresno Slough. The largest riparian habitats are concentrated in the Centerville Bottoms, east of Sanger, where the river divides into multiple channels over a roughly 5-mile (8.0 km) wide area. Below Highway 99 the river channels, with few exceptions, are almost completely channelized and modified from their native state. A minimum Kings River flow of 100 cubic feet per second (2.8 m^{3}/s) is maintained at all times via releases from Pine Flat Dam, in order to support fish populations and riparian habitats.

In the foothills, California oak woodlands consisting mainly of blue and black oak occur along the Kings River, Mill Creek and other perennial tributaries. Other foothill areas are dominated by thick chaparral and brush. At lower to middle elevations in the Sierra Nevada portion of the watershed, mixed conifer forests are the primary habitat, with ponderosa pine and yellow pine being dominant. Some areas, such as the steeper and more exposed north wall of Kings Canyon, remain primarily chaparral and brush. Giant sequoias are found in this area of the watershed. The General Grant Grove is located about 10 miles (16 km) southwest of the Middle and South Fork confluence; the Kings River groves, a set of four smaller groves, are situated lower in elevation and close to the South Fork.

Higher up in the Sierra, subalpine forests below the treeless alpine zone are characterized by red fir, lodgepole pine, whitebark pine, mountain hemlock and foxtail pine. Above 10,000 feet (3,000 m) in elevation, glacial features such as cirques and tarns characterize the landscape, with various wildflower and shrub species occurring in between areas of bare rock. Although the high country is usually covered in snow from November to May, as many as 600 plant species occur in the alpine zone of Sequoia-Kings Canyon National Parks, and twice that many are present in other parts of the parks. Starting in 2002, the U.S. Forest Service managed certain areas of the Kings basin under the Kings River Experimental Watersheds program, whose various activities include vegetation thinning and prescribed burns to address overgrowth, erosion and wildfire risk with the overall goal of improving water quality. These sites are concentrated mostly around the North Fork and Pine Flat Lake.

Above Pine Flat Dam, the Kings River holds native rainbow trout as well as introduced brown trout and smallmouth bass; the Upper Kings is designated a "Wild Trout Water" by the California Department of Fish and Game. Rainbow trout are also present in the river below the dam; however, the installation of a hydroelectric plant at Pine Flat Dam in 1984 diminished the cold water supply in the reservoir and deteriorated rainbow trout habitat as a result. In 1999, the state of California implemented the Kings River Fisheries Management Program, which has helped recover the fishery by mandating a minimum cold water pool of 100,000 acre-feet (0.12 km^{3}) in Pine Flat Reservoir, and enforcing angling restrictions. Other fish species in the lower Kings include native Sacramento pikeminnow and Sacramento sucker (also present in smaller numbers upstream), and introduced species such as common carp, channel catfish and striped bass.

Another notable animal species is Kings River pyrg, a spring snail half the size of a pea that can only be found in 13 isolated desert springs around Thacker pass. However, the disruption of groundwater flows, road construction, and livestock grazing drove this interesting snail to near extinction.

== Early history ==
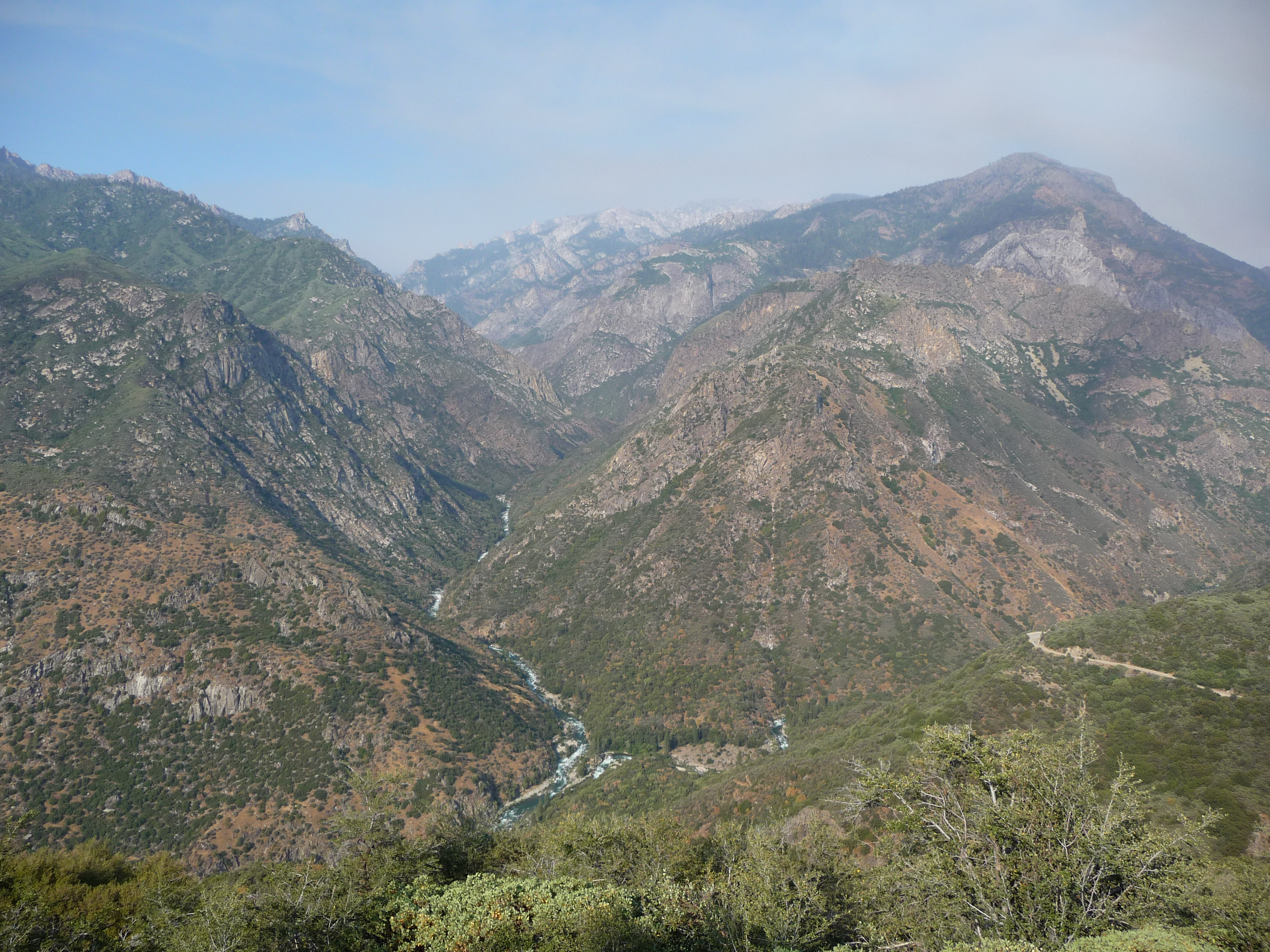
View of the Middle and South Fork confluence from Junction View

At the time of first European contact, at least 5,000, but possibly as many as 15,000–20,000 Native Americans lived along the lower Kings River and its many branches in the Central Valley. The Kings River watershed is traditional Yokuts territory; the Kings River dialects of the Yokutsan language were divided among the Choynimni, who lived along about 10 miles (16 km) of the Kings River between present-day Piedra and Sanger; the Chukaymina along the Mill Creek tributary, and the Michahay further south. At least two other dialects, the Aiticha and the Toyhicha, were spoken further downstream on the Kings, but these groups have not been well documented.

The Yokuts mainly lived along the Kings River below the foothills and along the marshy fringes of Tulare Lake. The extensive oak forests in the Kings River riparian zone provided acorns, their main source of food. Wetlands provided them with abundant fish, waterfowl, fur-bearing animals including beaver and river otter, and edible roots. Tule rushes provided material for roofing their pit houses and building rafts and canoes, the main form of transport in the often flooded low country. The Yokuts traded with Paiute peoples (the Mono) in the Great Basin to the east, via various trails across the Sierra Nevada, one of which may have been via Kearsarge Pass at the eastern end of Kings Canyon. About 500 years ago, some of the Mono migrated west, settling in the foothills of the Sierra Nevada above Yokuts territory, where they eventually formed a distinct subgroup known as the Western Mono.

The first recorded Spanish explorers to see the Kings River were the members of Gabriel Moraga's expedition, which camped along the river on January 6, 1806, the day of the Epiphany. Thus, they named the river El Rio de los Santos Reyes ("River of the Holy Kings", i.e. the Three Magi), later shortened to Rio Reyes, Rio de los Reyes or other variations thereof. Father Pedro Muñoz, a member of the 1806 expedition, wrote: "All the meadows are well covered with oak, alder, cottonwood and willow. The river abounds with beaver and fish. It is a location suitable for a mission, although there would also have to be a presidio." Extending the California mission system inland was a major goal of the Spanish Empire in the 1800s. However, no missions were ever established along the Kings River or elsewhere in the Central Valley.

Jedediah Smith was the first American explorer to see the Kings River, encountering it during a fur trapping expedition in 1827. John C. Fremont's expedition in 1844 attempted to find a route over the Sierra Nevada via the Kings River, but were forced to turn back by deep snows and difficult terrain. Fourteen years later a party led by J.H. Johnson successfully crossed Kearsarge Pass – the route Fremont had failed to find – becoming the first known non-Native Americans to do so. Early maps from this era label the Kings River under a variety of names. Smith recorded the river as the Kimmel-che or Wimmel-che after "Indians of that name who reside on it", likely a Yokuts clan or village along the lower part of the river. Fremont called it River of the Lake or Lake Fork, as it was the largest stream flowing into Tulare Lake. Some older maps label it King's River, translated from the original Spanish name. By 1852, the name Kings River was in common use.

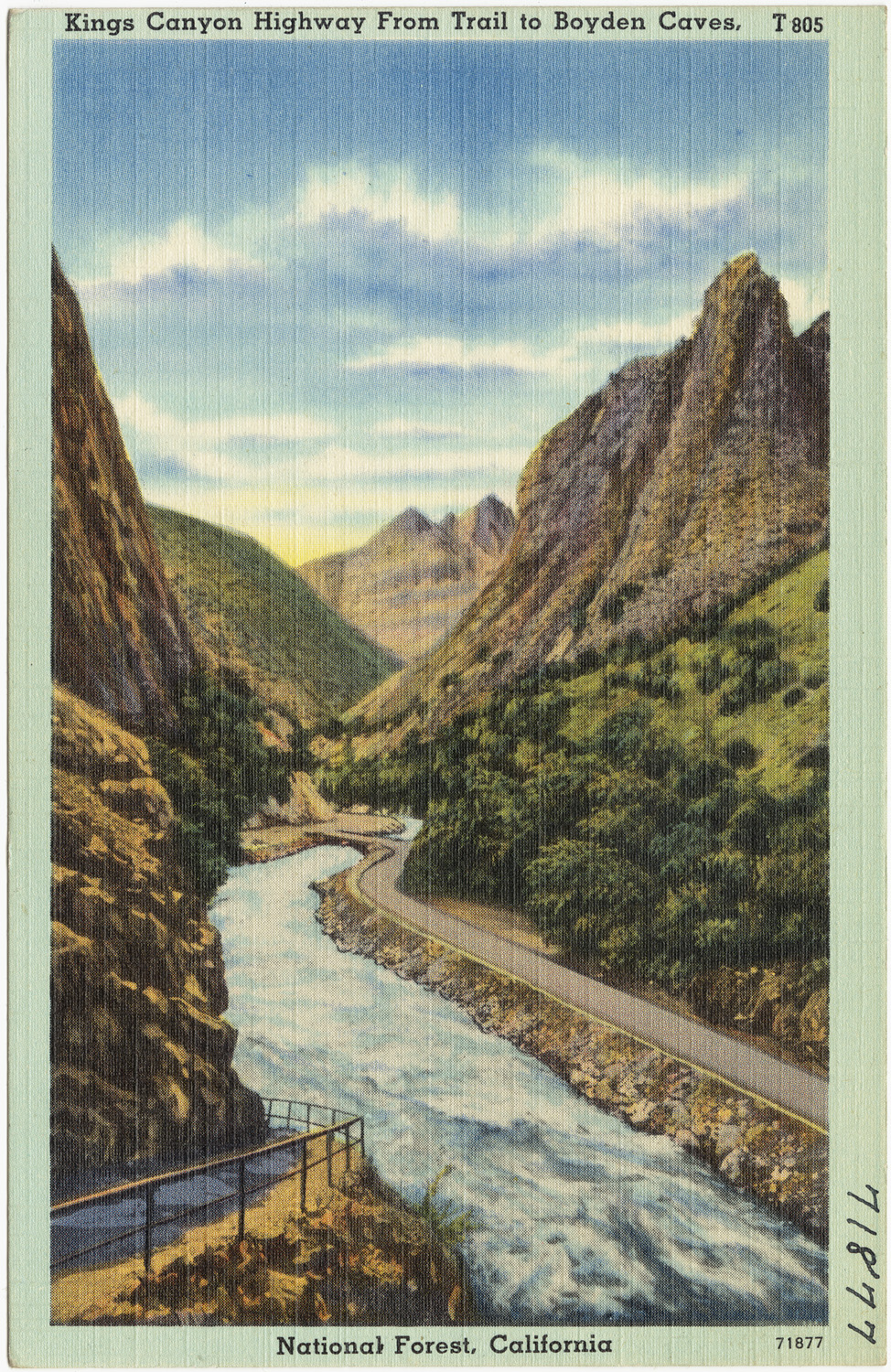
Postcard of Kings River, ca. 1930–1945

After California became a U.S. state in 1850, the upper Kings River watershed was used intermittently by stockmen, prospectors and loggers, and the lower watershed was used mainly for cattle and sheep ranching. Scottsburg, one of the first American towns on the Kings River, was founded in 1854. Destroyed twice by flooding, it was reestablished as today's Centerville in 1867. Smith's Ferry, established by James Smith in 1855, was one of several ferries established on the Kings River for travelers on the Stockton-Los Angeles Road and since it was the only one accessible during high water, remained the most important crossing of the Kings River for almost twenty years. After the Kern River gold rush of 1853, settlers arrived in large numbers to Tulare County and conflict broke out with Native Americans; a proposal to remove the natives to the Tejon Reservation was not acted upon. Skirmishes continued over the next few years, culminating in the Tule River War in spring 1856. Most of the natives not killed in the fighting or by foreign diseases were forcibly relocated from their lands along the Kings River to the Tule River Indian Reservation, where their descendants live today.

From the 1860s to the early 1900s, logging was one of the biggest industries in the upper Kings River. In 1890 two San Francisco businessmen purchased 30,000 acres (12,000 ha) in the upper Kings watershed and founded the Kings River Lumber Company, intending to log the area's abundant giant sequoias. Between 1890 and 1926 a huge logging operation was extended across the mountains, an area including Converse Basin Grove – then the world's largest grove of sequoias – which was almost completely clear-cut. A dam was built to form Hume Lake, feeding a flume running more than 40 miles (64 km) down Kings Canyon to carry logs to the mill in Sanger. Despite the scale of the venture it was ultimately unprofitable. Sequoia wood is soft and unsuitable for most construction; in addition, the trees were so tall that they often shattered into unusable pieces when they hit the ground.

When John Muir visited and wrote about the Kings River and its canyon in the late 19th century, he brought attention to the area's potential as a tourist attraction and its merit as a nature preserve. Muir lobbied for the preservation of the sequoia groves above the Kings River, which include General Grant Grove, home to the world's second largest tree. Due to his efforts and those of local politicians and civic activists, President Benjamin Harrison signed a bill establishing General Grant National Park in October 1890. However, it would not be until 1940 when the park was extended to the middle and south forks of the Kings River and renamed Kings Canyon National Park.

== Settlement of the Kings delta ==
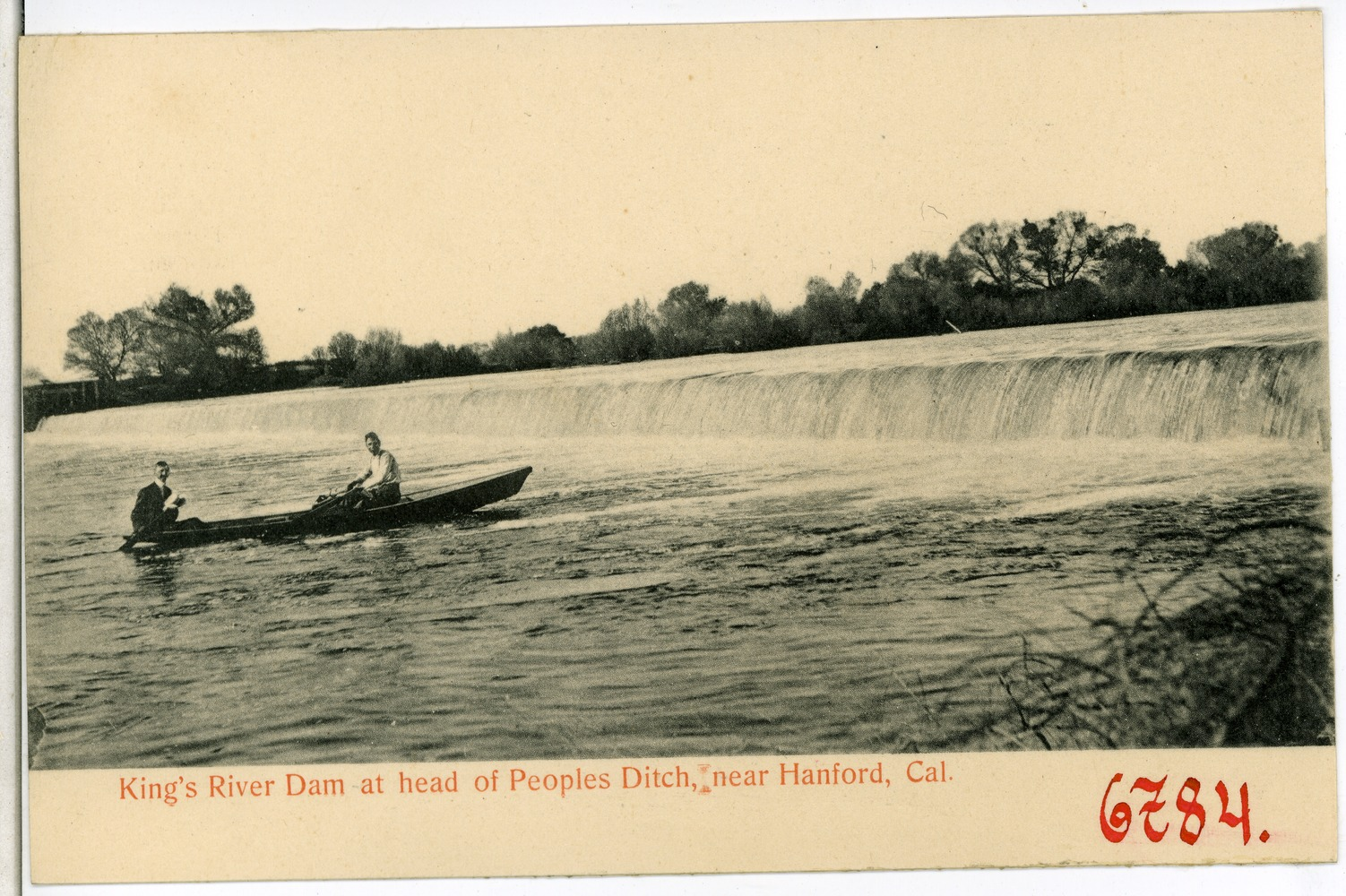
Dam on Kings River at head of Peoples' Ditch, 1905

The Kings River country was not an attractive site for early settlers, because for most of its lower course the river flows in an incised channel between low bluffs (an area known as the Centerville Bottoms), leaving the surrounding plains high and dry, suitable only for livestock grazing. Further downstream, approaching Tulare Lake, the land was too swampy for farming in addition to being seasonally flooded. For this reason, farmers initially favored the more well-watered Kaweah Delta, the present-day location of Visalia, to the south. Agriculture along the Kings River was limited to the Centerville Bottoms until ditches were extended from further upstream to supply the surrounding lands, the first being the short Byrd Ditch in 1858. The Great Flood of 1862 and another in 1868 destroyed most of the early settlements along the Kings River, and also wiped out the cattle ranching economy of the San Joaquin Valley, precipitating an economic shift to farming.

Starting in 1870 the settlement of the region began in earnest, and larger and more permanent water supply systems were built. Long canals brought water to the large, semi-arid prairie between the Kings and San Joaquin rivers, enabling the growth of Fresno and attracting many more settlers to the area. Farming cooperatives or "colonies", where large landowners subdivided many small plots for individual farmers, were a popular early pattern of settlement and attracted immigrants from the eastern United States, Europe, and Asia. A few individuals were able to amass huge land holdings by exploiting loopholes in the Homestead Act and Swamp Land Act, the most successful being J.G. Boswell and his nephew James G. Boswell II, who acquired as much as 200,000 acres (81,000 ha) in the lower Kings and the Tulare Lake bed. Despite portions being sold off since the 1980s, the Boswell family farm remains the largest privately owned farm in the world, at 150,000 acres (61,000 ha).

The Wright Act of 1887 allowed farmers to organize into irrigation districts, enabling them to pool their resources and greatly extend the reach of canal systems. The Alta Irrigation District, established in 1888, was the first of the newly formed irrigation districts to deliver water; it would be followed by at least eighteen others (some of which have since been consolidated). However, drought spawned conflict between earlier landowners with riparian rights and their newly arrived counterparts. In the days before Pine Flat Dam, the river often dropped too low by August or September to satisfy all the demands on it, and often disputes escalated to armed conflict over the control of canal gates. In 1897 the first Kings River water agreement was made, establishing irrigation districts' legal priority to water, resolving many lawsuits. However, by 1913 practically all the Kings River's water was being used and farmers demanded a solution. In 1919 state engineer Charles L. Kaupke was assigned as the first Kings River "watermaster" – a role he served until 1956 – to settle issues of rationing and establish a "diversion schedule" to reduce water waste.

All these actions were still not enough to solve the basic issue of seasonal drought, and in 1925 a local board was convened to discuss the possibility of building a dam at Pine Flat. The Kings River Water Association (KRWA), representing most of the local water districts, was established two years later with Kaupke as its head. However, when the Great Depression hit, the districts could not sell the bonds necessary to build a dam, and the federal government was asked to step in. The U.S. Bureau of Reclamation wanted to build the dam as part of its Central Valley Project and the U.S. Army Corps of Engineers wanted to build it as a separate flood control project. The KRWA favored the Corps' proposal because the reclamation project would be subject to a 160-acre (65 ha) limitation per farm – a product of the Newlands Reclamation Act – and many farms in the area were larger than that (though none owned nearly as much land as the Boswells, who lobbied heavily for the Corps' project).

Political conflict raged on for more than ten years, with the Corps ultimately being authorized to build the dam, and the Bureau authorized to manage water storage. The dam was constructed between 1949 and 1954; only 19 months after its dedication, it stopped the monstrous flood of December 1955, the largest recorded flood on the Kings since at least 1862, sparing downstream towns from heavy damage. In 1963 all Kings River water users signed an agreement with the Bureau of Reclamation establishing their shares of storage in Pine Flat Lake, granting them "perpetual rights to use of storage subordinate only to flood control purposes," and in 1969 the California Department of Water Resources declared the Kings River fully appropriated, meaning that no new water rights can be claimed, unless bought from existing rights-holders.

== Modern uses ==
=== Irrigation ===
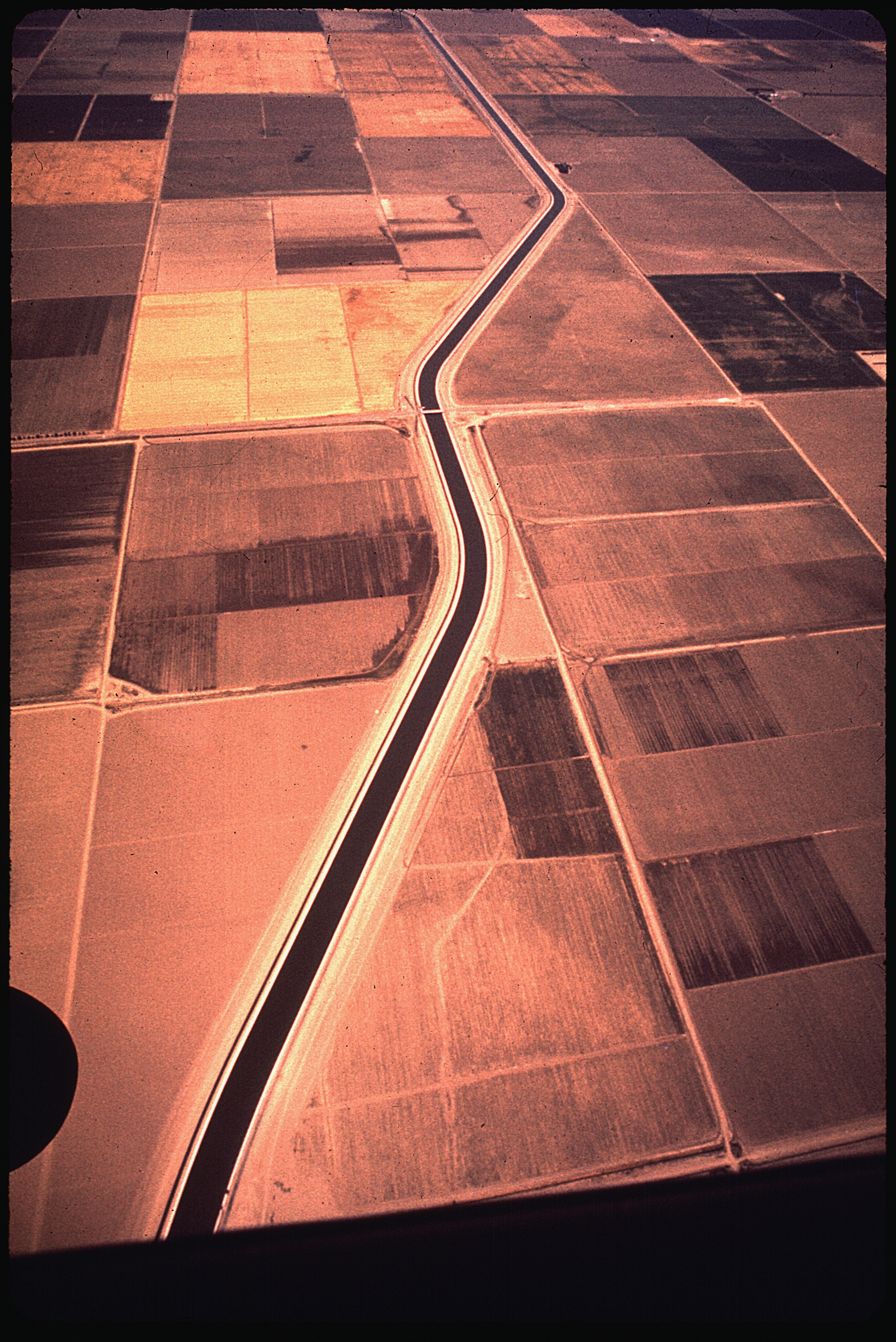
A canal carrying water from the Kings River in the San Joaquin Valley

Almost all of the Kings River's water is consumed for agriculture. The river irrigates about 1.1 million acres (4,500 km^{2}) of some of the most productive farmland in the United States; in 2009 the Kings delta produced crops valued at more than $3 billion. Fresno County, which is mostly supplied by Kings River water, ranked first among U.S. counties for agriculture sales in 2012. Tulare and Kings Counties ranked second and tenth, respectively.

The main crops grown in the Kings River service area are grapes, citrus, grain, and various fruits and nuts. Other crops include alfalfa, berries, rice, and miscellaneous nursery and field crops. More than 1,000 miles (1,600 km) of man-made canals deliver water to fourteen irrigation districts in the San Joaquin Valley. The Fresno, Kings River, Consolidated, Raisin City, Liberty and Laguna districts are located to the west of the river; the Tri-Valley, Hills Valley, Orange Cove, Alta and Kings County districts are located to the south. Kings River water also supplies the Riverdale, Stilson, James, Tranquility and Mid-Valley districts via Fresno Slough.

Surface water deliveries have been managed by the Kings River Water Association (KRWA), headed by the Kings River watermaster, since 1927. The KRWA oversees the water supply to 28 member agencies and about 20,000 farms in the Kings River service area, and is responsible for adjudicating water rights as well as regulating water quality. A monthly "water entitlement schedule" determines how much water each agency receives, contingent on the flow of the Kings River.

The Friant-Kern Canal, a part of the Central Valley Project (CVP), is the only source of surface water from outside the Kings River basin. Only the Fresno Irrigation District is contracted for CVP water, but other Kings River users can also purchase CVP water in times of need, such as droughts. Summer water demand for irrigation is typically in the range of 6,000 to 7,000 cubic feet per second (170 to 200 m^{3}/s).

Groundwater is the other major source of water supply for the basin, providing a large part of the agricultural supply and all of the water used by area cities. The Kings River Conservation District (KRCD), among its other functions, is the primary agency managing groundwater use. The Kings Basin Water Authority also monitors groundwater use, as well as certain water conservation, water quality and environmental functions. The Kings River provides more than 100,000 acre-feet (120,000,000 m^{3}) of groundwater recharge to the local aquifer each year. However, depths to groundwater have been increasing for many years, indicating concern for the safe yield of the aquifer. The annual overdraft is estimated at 100,000 to 150,000 acre-feet (120,000,000 to 190,000,000 m^{3}).

=== Hydropower ===
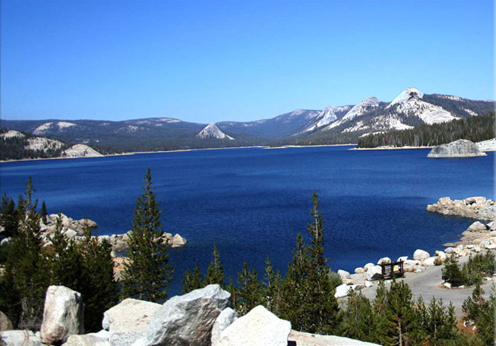
Courtright Reservoir is the upper reservoir for the Helms Pumped Storage Plant, the largest power station of its kind in California.

The Kings River system has several major hydroelectric plants; the only one on the main stem is the 165-megawatt (221,000 hp) Jeff L. Taylor Pine Flat Power Plant, located at the base of Pine Flat Dam. KRCD has operated the power plant since its completion in 1984. Power generation at Pine Flat Dam is incidental, meaning it is governed by demand for irrigation water or flood control requirements rather than demand for power. There was a proposal to add one more dam on the Kings River near Piedra, which would create a small regulating reservoir below Pine Flat Dam, allowing the power station to be used for peaking purposes while releasing a stable flow for irrigation. Due to environmental concerns and a poor cost-benefit ratio this project was never built.

Further upstream, the three forks of the Kings have considerable hydropower potential due to their large drop in elevation from the Sierra crest. However, because the Middle and South Forks are located in Kings Canyon National Park, only the North Fork is utilized for hydroelectric generation. The Haas, Balch No.1 and No.2, and Kings River powerhouses on the North Fork were built between 1927 and 1959 by Pacific Gas and Electric Company (PG&E) and can collectively produce 335 megawatts (449,000 hp). In 2010, the four North Fork powerhouses plus Pine Flat generated more than 2 billion kilowatt hours (7200 TJ) of energy. Between 1977 and 1984, PG&E constructed the 1,212-megawatt (1,625,000 hp) Helms Pumped Storage Plant located between the Wishon and Courtright Reservoirs. The Helms plant, which pumps water up into Courtright during periods of low demand and releases it during high demand periods, is crucial to stabilizing the California electric grid by providing peaking power.

During the first half of the 20th century, the Kings River was the focus of a political fight over Los Angeles' proposal to dam the Middle and South Forks for power generation. Local farmers feared the city's real intention was to divert Kings water south, as it had gained notoriety for doing in the Owens Valley water wars. The KRCD, however, also wanted to dam these rivers for irrigation, and thus the proposed dam sites were excluded from Kings Canyon National Park as designated in 1940. It was not until 1965 when these areas were finally added to the park, ending a debate which had lasted more than sixty years. Today, the 11,449-foot (3,490 m) fall from the head of the South Fork to Pine Flat Reservoir remains the longest undammed drop of any U.S. river.

=== Flood control ===
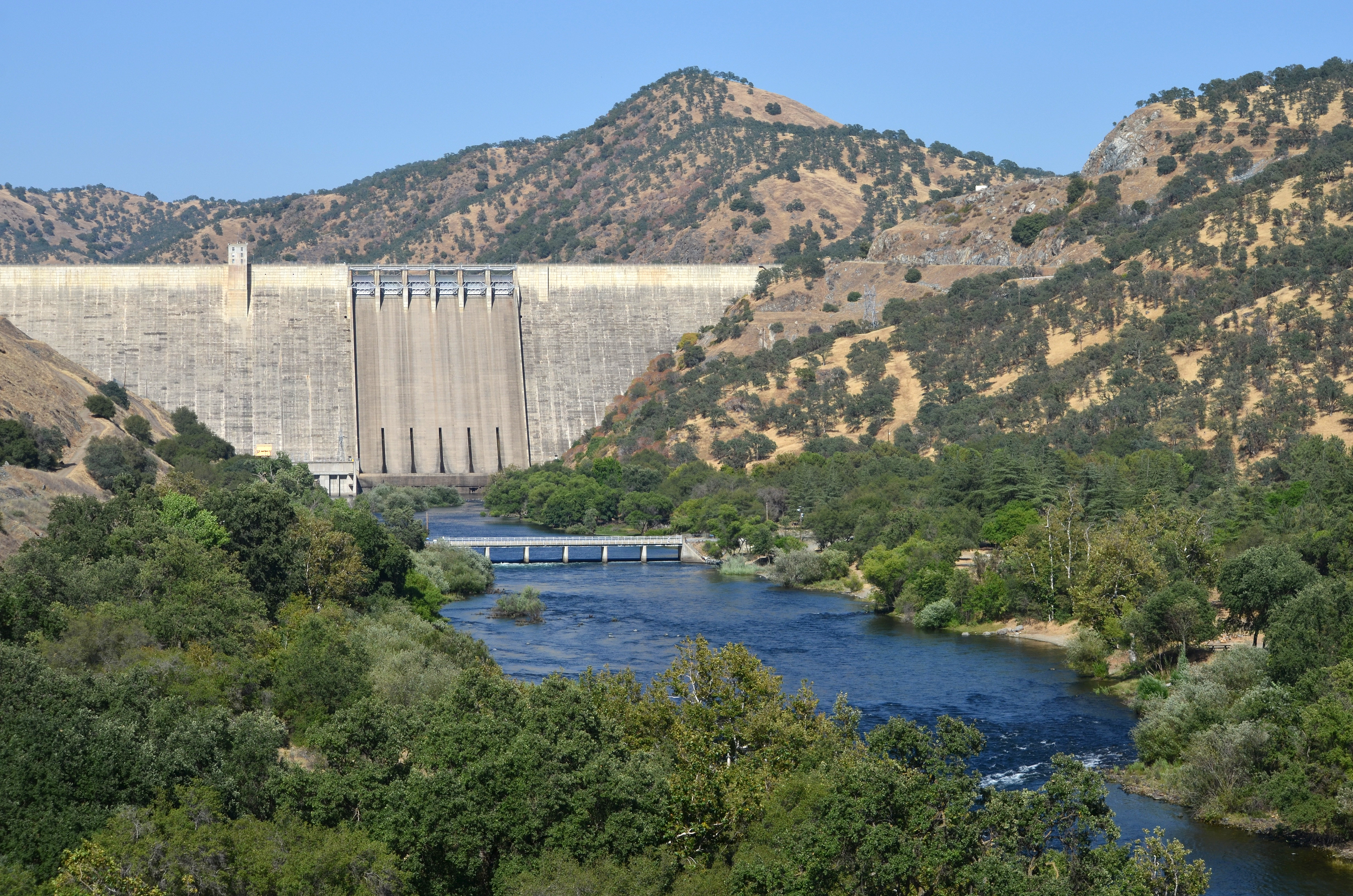
Pine Flat Dam and the Kings River

Pine Flat Dam, holding up to 1,000,000 acre-feet (1.2 km^{3}) of water, is the primary flood control facility in the Kings River Basin. The winter and spring flood control reservation is 475,000 acre-feet (0.586 km^{3}), although the reservoir can be drawn down further depending on the size of the Sierra snowpack.

During the winter and spring, the U.S. Army Corps of Engineers is responsible for determining the water release from Pine Flat Dam. The dam provides flood protection for 80,000 acres (32,000 ha) of farmland along the Kings River and another 260,000 acres (110,000 ha) in the old Tulare Lake bed. Pine Flat Dam is operated so that the flow at Crescent Weir (about 50 miles (80 km) downstream of Pine Flat, near Riverdale) does not exceed 4,750 cubic feet per second (135 m^{3}/s), although this amount is frequently exceeded due to the large size and heavy runoff from the Kings watershed.

The floodwater capacity of the Kings River falls dramatically in downstream areas, from 50,000 cubic feet per second (1,400 m^{3}/s) between Pine Flat Dam and Highway 180 to 13,000 cubic feet per second (370 m^{3}/s) at Kingsburg. The key flood control facility on the lower river is the Island Weir and Army Weir complex, which control the water flow into the north and south forks of the Kings River, respectively. Flood flows up to 4,750 cubic feet per second (135 m^{3}/s) are sent north; flows of up to 1,200 cubic feet per second (34 m^{3}/s) above that level are diverted south into the Tulare Lake bed, and flows above that combined level are sent north.

On the north fork floodwaters are again divided at the Crescent Weir with the first 4,750 cubic feet per second (135 m^{3}/s) sent north via Fresno Slough and James Bypass into the San Joaquin River, and the next 2,000 cubic feet per second (57 m^{3}/s) south into the Tulare Lake bed. Any flows exceeding the total 7,950 cubic feet per second (225 m^{3}/s) channel capacity of the north and south Forks are divided in whichever direction is currently safer.

The Kings River Conservation District (KRCD) is in charge of maintaining the system of flood control channels and levees. On the lower river west of Highway 99, the KRCD has worked since the 1950s to maintain the floodwater capacity of the Kings River and its various distributaries in the San Joaquin Valley. The KRCD service area consists of 140 miles (230 km) of levees starting from below Kingsburg, to SR 145 on the North Fork of the river, and to near Stratford on the South Fork. During flood conditions, KRCD patrols the levees 24 hours a day to monitor and repair any damages.

Since its construction in 1954, Pine Flat Dam has not provided the high degree of flood protection originally intended by the project. An average of 200,000 acre-feet (0.25 km^{3}) of water are spilled each year because the reservoir is not big enough to hold it. In 1969 a total of 1,017,000 acre-feet (1.254 km^{3}), more than the entire capacity of the lake, flowed over the spillway, causing heavy damage downstream. The Bureau of Reclamation has studied the possibility of raising Pine Flat Dam to store more water.

In addition, local irrigation districts are engaged in efforts to use floodwater for groundwater recharge rather than allowing it to drain away, including the use of certain farm fields as temporary flood basins in winter. This will both reduce flood damage and provide more water for farmers' use.

== Recreation ==
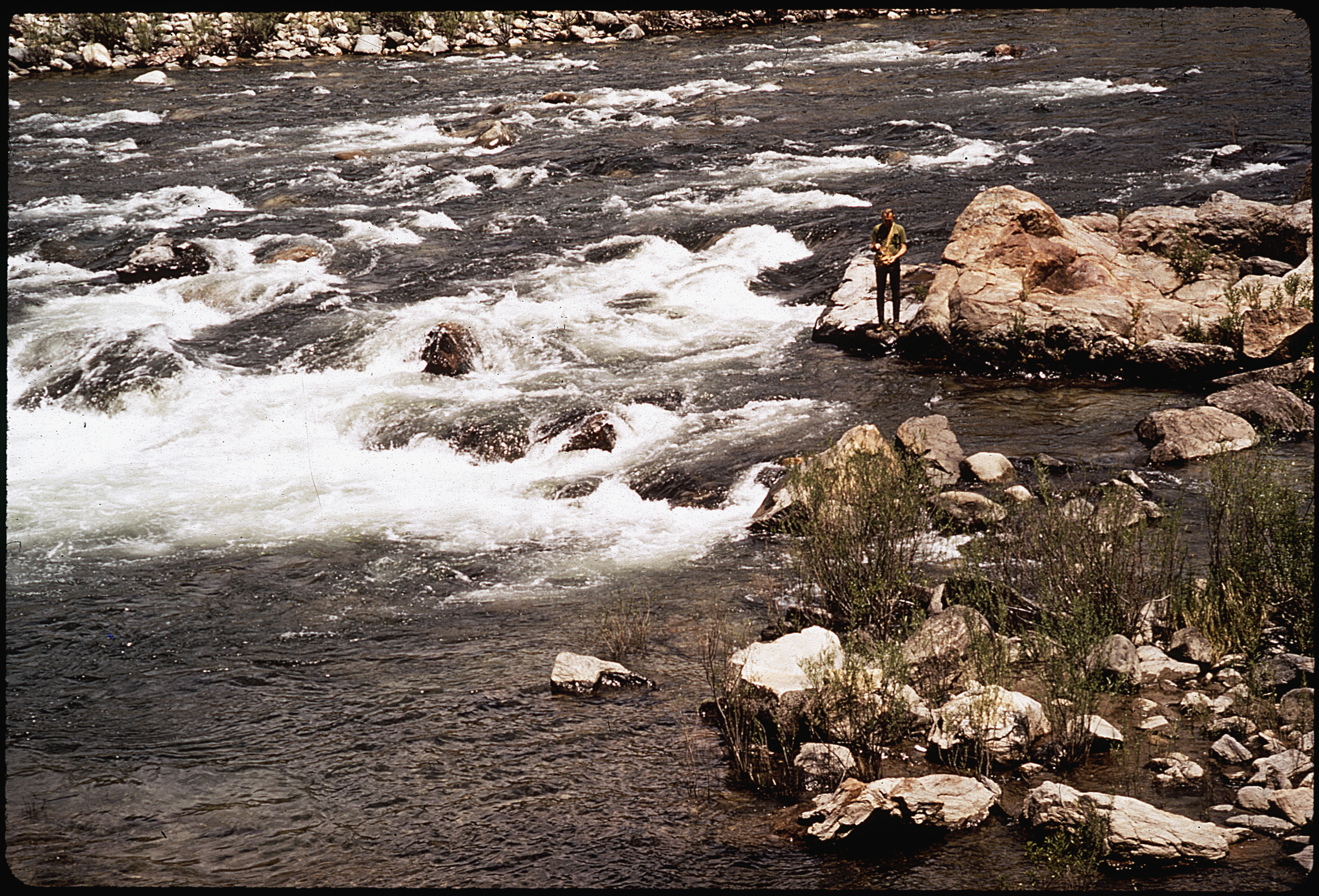
Fishing on the Kings River near Centerville

The upper reaches of the Kings River, including the entirety of the Middle Fork and most of the South Fork, flow through rugged backcountry that can be reached only by foot or on horseback. The Middle and South Forks are part of the National Wild and Scenic Rivers System, as is about 15 miles (24 km) of the main Kings below their confluence. About 65.5 miles (105.4 km) are classified as Wild and 15.5 miles (24.9 km) as Recreational. The North Fork is more accessible, with boating, camping and visitor facilities at Wishon Reservoir and a boat launch at Courtright Reservoir.

Whitewater rafting and kayaking on the Middle and South Forks is "extremely dangerous" and is usually only done by experts. However, the main Kings between the Garnet Dike put-in and Pine Flat Lake is a popular run for both commercial rafting companies and private boaters. According to the Forest Service, "the Kings River has the highest volume of water which can safely be rafted in the Sierra Nevada", and due to the large size and high elevation of its drainage basin it has a longer boating season than most other Sierra rivers.

The Kings River and its forks above Pine Flat Lake has naturally reproducing populations of rainbow trout, brown trout and brook trout. Fishing access above Pine Flat Lake extends as far upstream as Garlic Falls; beyond there, the canyon is too narrow to enter safely by foot except during periods of extremely low water. In lower elevation reaches and in the reservoir, smallmouth bass and spotted bass are common.

Below Pine Flat Dam the Kings River is wide and slow-flowing, with tailwater fishing for trout roughly between the dam and Highway 180; further downstream, carp, bass and catfish are more common. The lower river is suitable for swimming, floating and canoeing with many public access points between the dam and Avocado Lake. Below there, most of the banks are private property, with exceptions such as Pierce's Park at Highway 180. Although there are few natural obstructions along the lower Kings, there are a number of diversion weirs that pose a hazard to boaters and must be portaged.

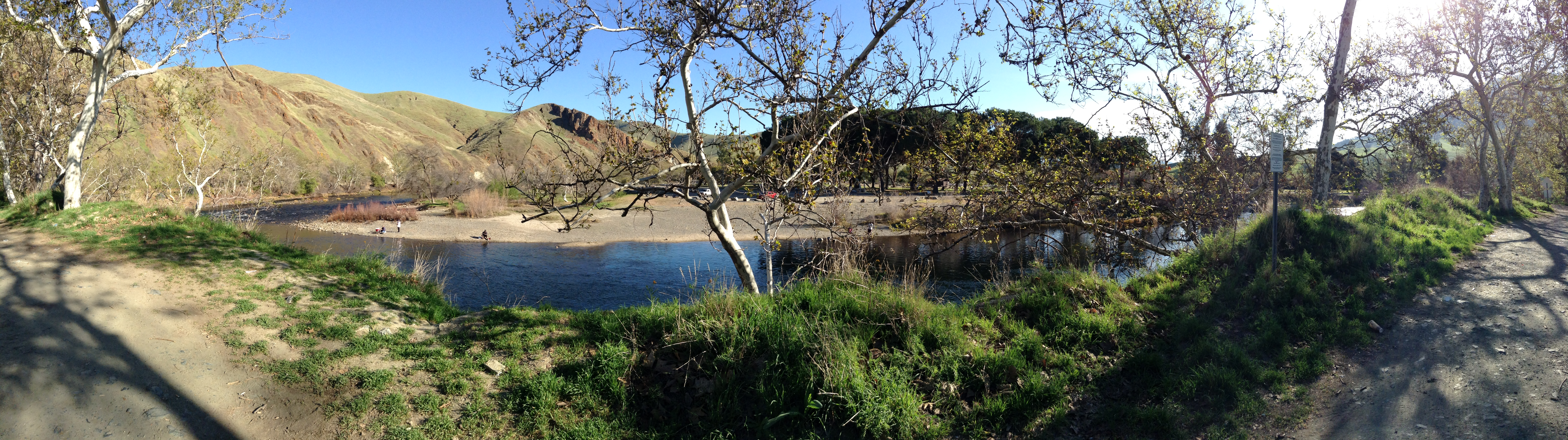
Panorama of the Kings River near Piedra

== List of tributaries ==
Tributaries of the Kings River are listed going upstream from the North Fork/South Fork split near Lemoore. Major lakes/reservoirs and dams are also listed. Distributaries of the Kings River below Lemoore are detailed in the Course section.

- Fish Creek
- Hughes Creek
- Mill Creek
- Pine Flat Dam, Pine Flat Lake
  - Deer Creek
  - Zebe Creek
  - Russian Charlie Creek
  - Lefever Creek
  - Billy Creek
  - Sycamore Creek
  - Big Creek
  - Sacata Creek
  - Redoak Creek
  - Lower Rancheria Creek
  - Sycamore Springs Creek
- North Fork Kings River
  - Dinkey Creek
  - Basin Creek
  - Patterson Creek
  - Weir Creek
  - Black Rock Creek
  - Williams Creek
  - Mule Creek
  - Rancheria Creek
  - Teakettle Creek
  - Long Meadow Creek
  - Wishon Dam, Wishon Reservoir
    - Woodchuck Creek
    - Short Hair Creek
    - Sharp Creek
  - Helms Creek
  - Courtright Dam, Courtright Reservoir
    - Dusy Creek
  - Post Corral Creek
    - Burnt Corral Creek
  - Flemming Creek
  - Nichols Canyon
  - Meadow Brook
  - Fall Creek
  - Division Lake
  - Regiment Lake
- Davis Creek
  - Mill Flat Creek
- Verplank Creek
- Fox Canyon Creek
- Converse Creek
- Spring Creek
- Cabin Creek
- Garlic Meadow Creek
- Rough Creek
- Ten Mile Creek
  - Hume Lake
- Middle Fork Kings River
  - Deer Canyon Creek
  - Brush Canyon Creek
  - Tombstone Creek
  - Wren Creek
  - Silver Creek
  - Crown Creek
    - Rogers Creek
  - Gorge of Despair
  - Crystal Creek
  - Blue Canyon Creek
  - Lost Canyon Creek
  - Rattlesnake Creek
  - Alpine Creek
  - Dog Creek
  - Kennedy Creek
  - Dougherty Creek
  - [Horseshoe Creek
  - Goddard Creek
    - Disappearing Creek
  - Windy Canyon Creek
  - Cartridge Creek
  - Rimbaud Creek
  - Palisade Creek
    - Cataract Creek
    - Glacier Creek
  - Dusy Branch
  - Helen Lake
- South Fork Kings River
  - Lockwood Creek
  - Redwood Creek
  - Windy Gulch
  - Boulder Creek
  - Grizzly Creek
  - Lightning Creek
  - Deer Cove Creek
  - Lewis Creek
    - Comb Creek
  - Sheep Creek
  - Hotel Creek
  - Roaring River
    - Sugarloaf Creek
      - Ferguson Creek
  - Granite Creek
  - Copper Creek
  - Avalanche Creek
  - Bubbs Creek
    - Sphinx Creek
    - Charlotte Creek
    - Cross Creek
    - North Guard Creek
    - East Creek
  - Glacier Creek
  - Gardiner Creek
  - Woods Creek
    - Woods Creek
  - Arrow Creek
  - Kid Creek

== See also ==
- List of rivers of California
