= Dinkey Creek =

Dinkey Creek can refer to:

- Dinkey Creek, California, a town in California
- Dinkey Creek (California), a tributary of the North Fork Kings River
