= North Fork Kings River =

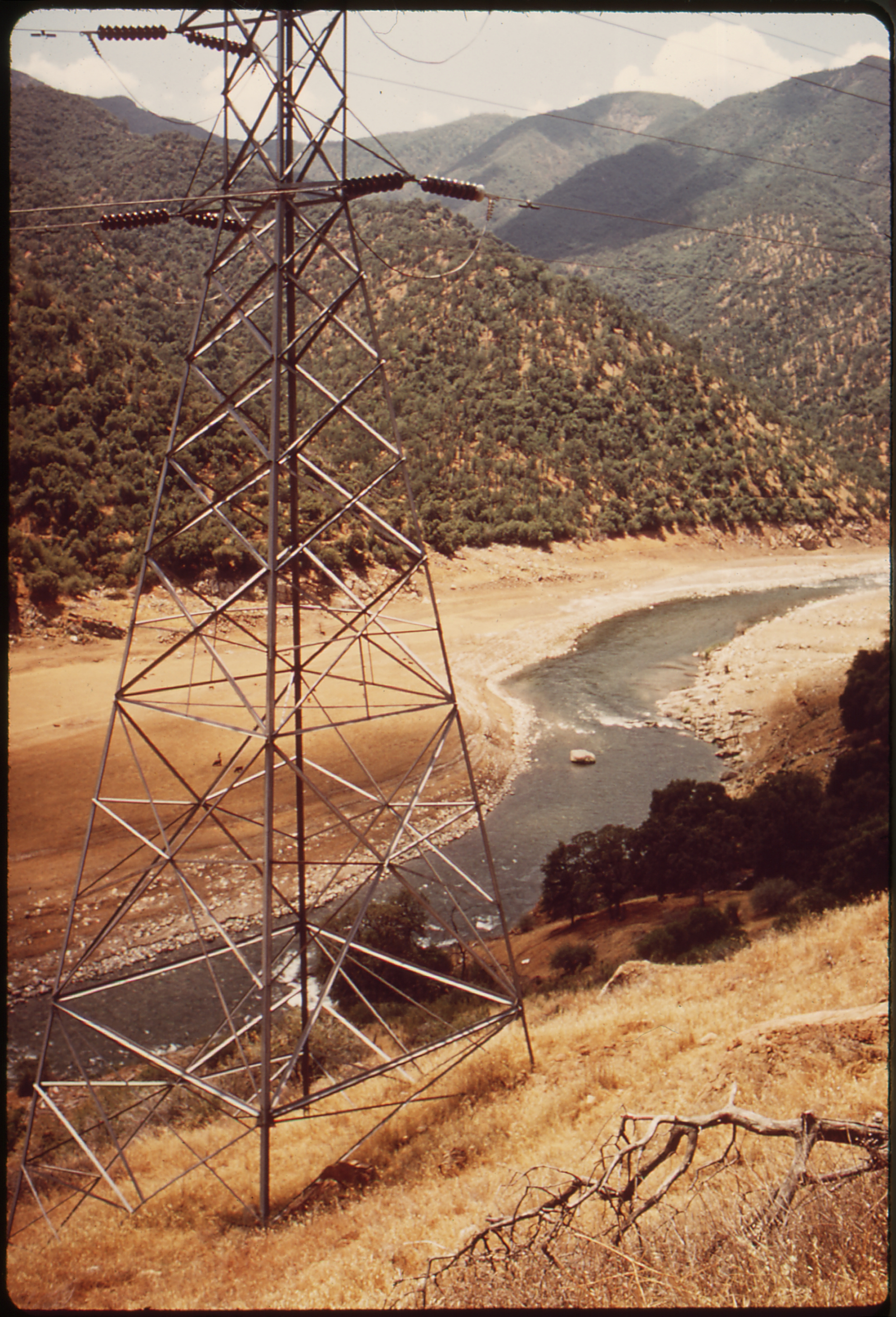
- North Fork Kings River

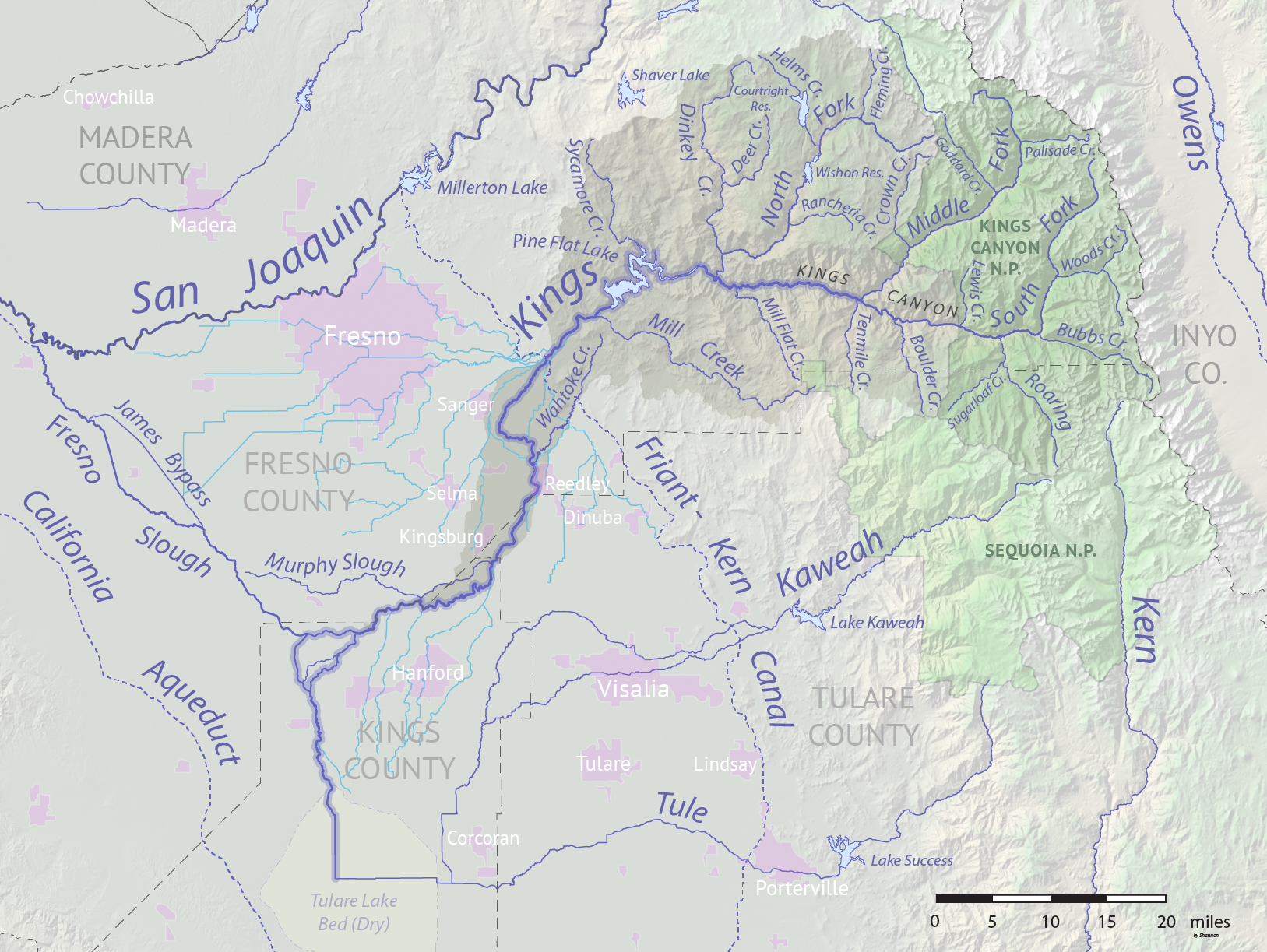
- Map of the Kings River watershed, including the North Fork

Location
- Country: United States
- State: California

Physical characteristics
- Source: Sierra Nevada
  - location: Fresno County
  - coordinates: 37°03′48″N 118°44′05″W
  - elevation: 11,280 ft (3,440 m)
- Mouth: Kings River
  - location: Rodgers Crossing, Fresno County
  - coordinates: 36°52′10″N 119°08′06″W
  - elevation: 1,020 ft (310 m)
- Length: 40.3 mi (64.9 km)
- Basin size: 387 sq mi (1,000 km^{2})
- Discharge
  - location: Balch Camp, including Balch Powerhouse diversion
  - average: 715 cu ft/s (20.2 m^{3}/s)
  - minimum: 6.4 cu ft/s (0.18 m^{3}/s)
  - maximum: 27,400 cu ft/s (780 m^{3}/s)

Basin features
- River system: Kings River basin
- Tributaries
  - right: Helms Creek, Dinkey Creek (California)

The North Fork Kings River is a 40.3-mile (64.9 km) tributary of the Kings River, in the U.S. state of California. The river's main stem is entirely within Fresno County, and its watershed drains about 387 square miles (1,000 km^{2}) of the southern Sierra Nevada mountain range.

== Course ==
It rises at an elevation of 11,380 feet (3,470 m) on the western border of the Sierra National Forest in an unnamed pond a mile (1.6 km) south of Mount Reinstein. It flows west through a high, lake-studded alpine basin before dropping into a deep valley. The river receives Post Corral and Helms creeks from the right before emptying into Wishon Reservoir, formed by the Wishon Dam. Flowing southwards into a gorge, the river then receives Rancheria Creek from the left, then turns southwest into Black Rock Reservoir. After this reservoir, it flows west and receives Patterson Creek from the right, and is impounded again at a small diversion dam. Shortly afterwards it receives Dinkey Creek, its largest tributary, from the right at Balch Camp, then turns south, flowing into the Kings River just northwest of Rodgers Crossing.

== River modifications ==
An extensive hydroelectric system is located along the North Fork. Below the Wishon Dam the North Fork flows through a gorge with a massive drop in elevation and is used to generate conventional hydroelectricity at two stations along its course. A 6-mile (9.7 km) tunnel from Wishon Reservoir carries water to the 128 megawatt underground Haas Powerhouse, where the water drops 850 feet (260 m) to power the turbines. Black Rock Reservoir serves as the afterbay for the Haas Powerhouse and forebay for Balch Powerhouse, located another 3 miles (4.8 km) downstream. Below that is the Kings River Powerhouse, which discharges water directly into Pine Flat Lake.

The Balch Powerhouse is one of the oldest hydro developments on the Kings River, originally completed in 1927 by San Joaquin Light & Power, a predecessor of Pacific Gas and Electric Company (PG&E). It was only after the Balch Powerhouse was incorporated into PG&E's system that plans were finalized for the Haas Powerhouse, which was completed in 1959. Construction on the big storage dams at Wishon and Courtright Reservoir were completed in 1962. The North Fork system was at one point, in the 1940s, the subject of a local controversy regarding whether it should be developed by the federal government or a private company (PG&E). Farmers feared that the federal plan would involve moving water south as part of the Central Valley Project, reducing what was available for local use. On the other hand, PG&E was willing to negotiate with the farmers for the use of reservoir water, and more importantly, its project would involve no transbasin diversions, keeping all the water in the Kings River system. The debate was settled in 1949 when PG&E was allowed to construct the Wishon and Courtright dams.

Wishon Reservoir and Courtright Reservoir, respectively, are the lower and upper reservoirs for the Helms Pumped Storage Plant, which at 1,212 megawatts is one of the largest pumped-storage hydroelectricity plants in the United States. Water is pumped into Courtright Reservoir during times of low demand and released into Wishon Reservoir to generate peaking power. Also owned by PG&E, the plant was built between 1977 and 1984.

== See also ==
- List of rivers of California
- Tulare Lake
- Middle Fork Kings River
- South Fork Kings River
