= Dinkey Lakes Wilderness =

Protected wilderness area in California, United States

- IUCN category Ib (wilderness area)
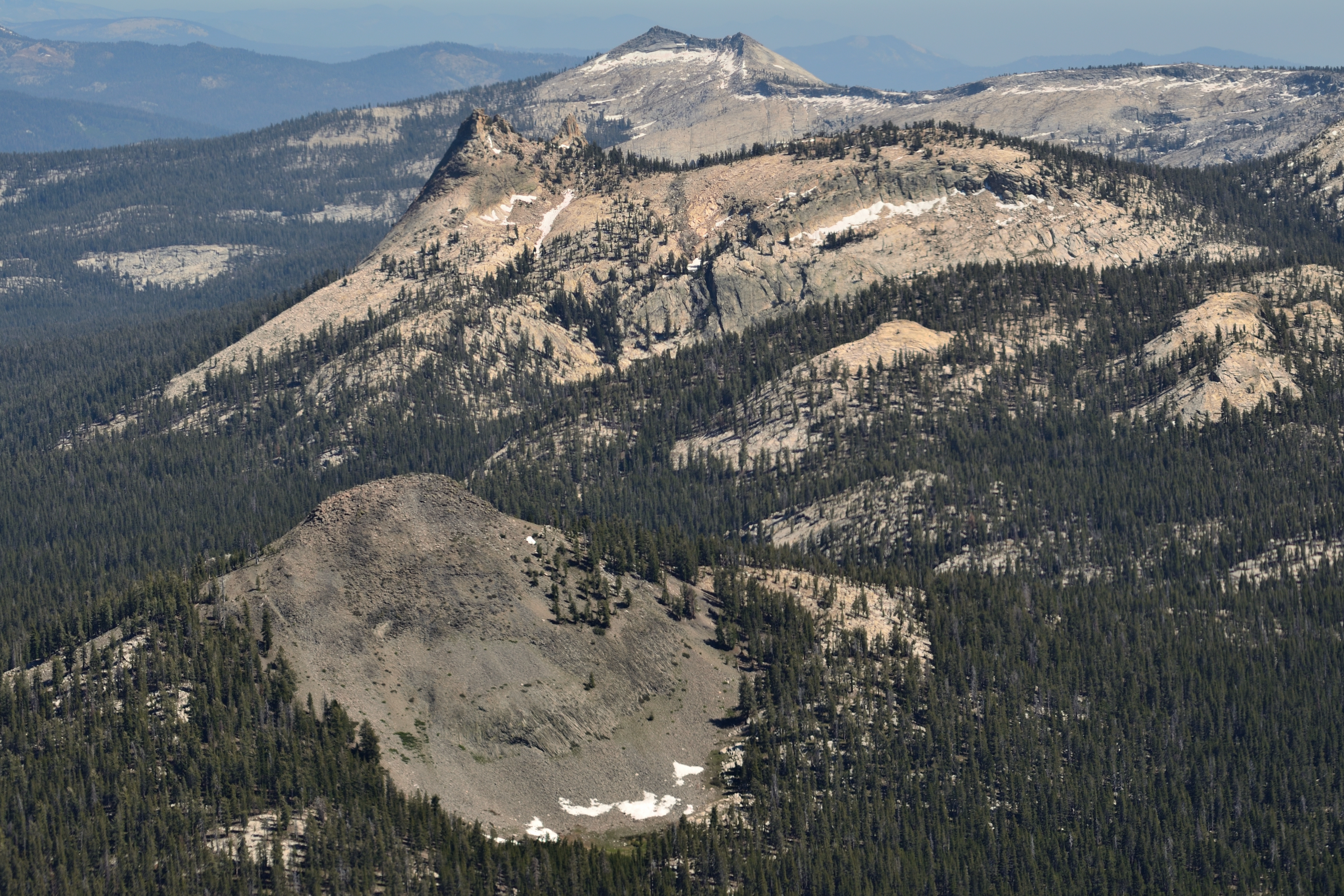
- Aerial view looking south over Dinkey Lakes Wilderness showing Black Peak, Dogtooth Peak, and Eagle Peak.

- Location within California Location within the United States
- Interactive map of Dinkey Lakes Wilderness
- Location: Fresno County, California, United States
- Nearest city: Fresno, CA
- Coordinates: 37.1713511427°N 119.036237702°W
- Area: 30,000 acres (12,141 ha)
- Established: September 28, 1984
- Governing body: U.S. Forest Service

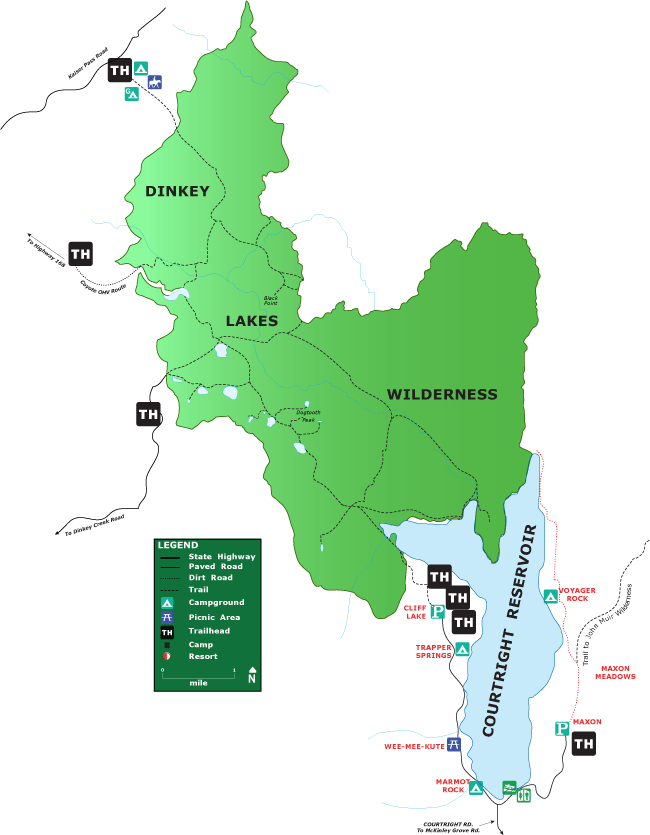
Map of wilderness area

The Dinkey Lakes Wilderness is a federally designated wilderness area located 45 miles (72 km) northeast of Fresno, in the state of California, United States. It comprises 30,000 acres (12,141 ha) within the Sierra National Forest and was added to the National Wilderness Preservation System by the California Wilderness Act of 1984. Elevations range from 8,200 feet (2,500 m) to 10,619 feet (3,237 m). Recreational activities in the wilderness include day hiking, backpacking, horseback riding, fishing, rock climbing and cross-country skiing.

== History ==
The Dinkey Lakes Wilderness is rumored to be named after a hunter's or shepherd's dog who died defending them from a bear in between what is now Courtright Reservoir and Shaver Lake. Sources claim that Dinkey Creek was the first landmark to be named after the dog with later landmarks following in suit. The Dinkey Lakes Wilderness was protected by Congress in 1984 with the passage of the California Wilderness Act.

== Geography and Geology ==
The landscape of Dinkey Lakes Wilderness is composed of sub-alpine forests with high, rolling ridges made up of granitic bedrock interspersed with large, wet meadows. A high divide along the southwestern boundary has several peaks over 10,000 ft (3,000 m). elevation, including the Three Sisters, Brown Peak, and Eagle Peak. Extensive glaciation is evident by the many cirques located at timberline.

== Flora and fauna ==
Wildlife include the North Kings and Huntington deer herds, black bear, golden-mantled ground squirrel, coyote, and the Sierra red fox. Also martins, and pikas in rocky areas above timberline.

Dinkey Lakes Wilderness has forests of red fir, lodgepole pine, western white pine, with mountain hemlock and whitebark pine at higher elevations. Additionally numerous flowering plants exist including multiple species of monkey flower

== Recreation ==
The large John Muir Wilderness (580,323 acres (234,848 ha)) is to the east of Dinkey Lakes and is separated from it by the Dusy-Ershim Off-Highway Vehicle (OHV) route. This corridor links Kaiser Pass in the north to the Courtright Reservoir in the south. There are three other OHV routes to the west of the wilderness boundary and are popular in the summer months.

Three entry points into the wilderness are; the Cliff Lake trailhead at Courtright Reservoir, Dinkey Creek trailhead and the California Riding and Hiking trailhead located at D and F Pack Station on Kaiser Pass road. There are 50 miles (80 km) of trails offering a variety of one way and loop trips into the lake basin areas and mountain summits.

The summits of Dogtooth Peak (10,256 feet or 3,126 metres) and Three Sisters (10,548 feet or 3,215 metres) offer Class 2 and Class 3 rock climbing routes.
There are 17 lakes in the wilderness with 14 of those being stocked with golden, brook and rainbow trout.

Winter recreation is limited by the long distance from plowed roads. The nearby Sierra Ski Summit Area on highway 168 provides access to the D and F Pack Station and trailhead which is two miles (3 km) north of the wilderness boundary.

A California campfire permit and a wilderness permit are required all year for overnight trips and can be obtained at various ranger stations of the Sierra National Forest as well as the Courtright Reservoir Homeowners Association building at Courtright Reservoir.

Quotas are in place for Dinkey Lakes Wilderness to limit and control the number of visitors. Permits are in effect all year and are divided up between advance reservations (60%) and walk-ins (40%). Each trailhead has a quota limit.

The Forest Service encourages the practice of Leave No Trace principles of wilderness travel to minimize human impact on the environment.

== See also ==
- McKinley Grove - a nearby giant sequoia grove.
