= Dinkey Creek (California) =

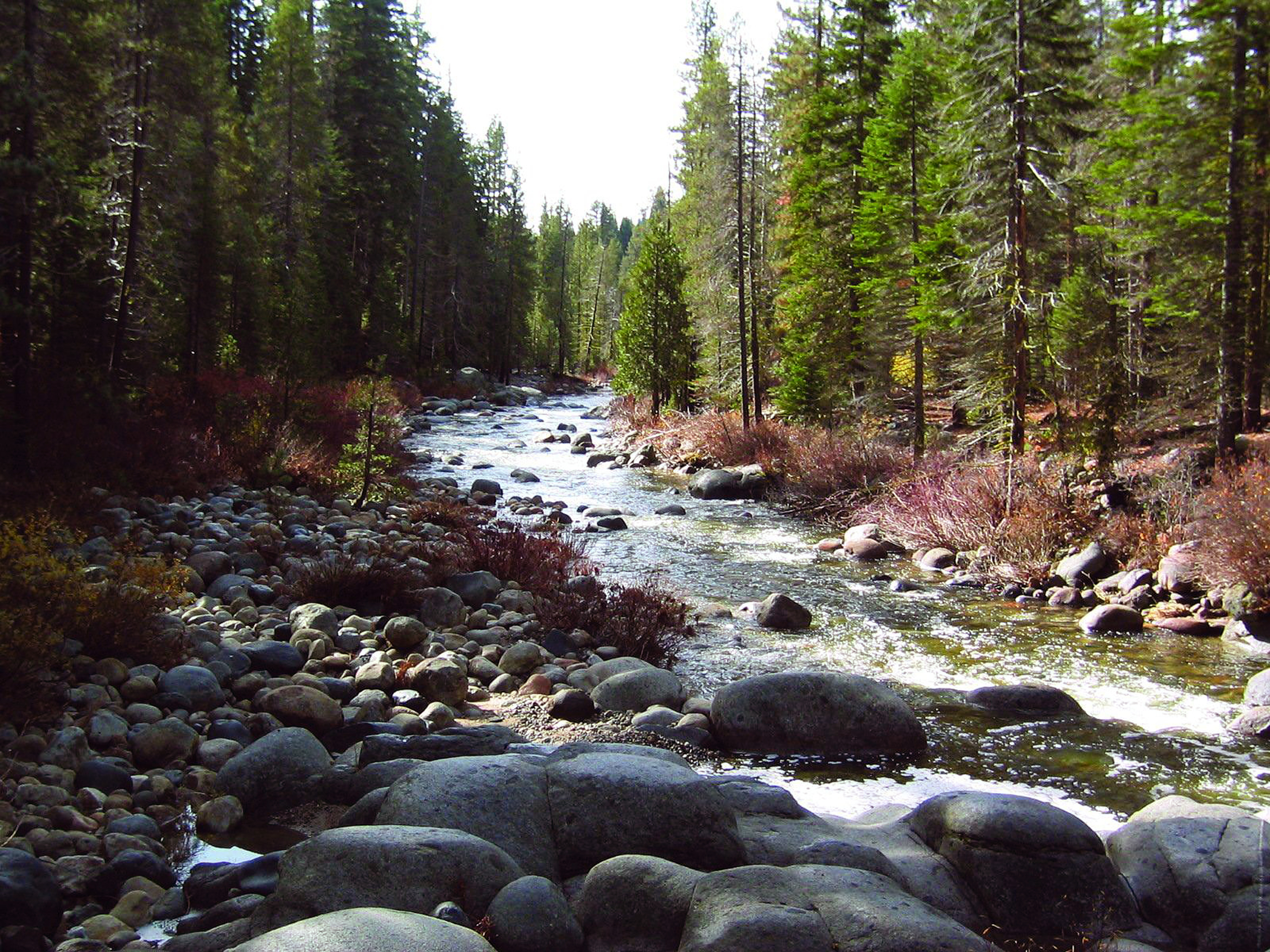

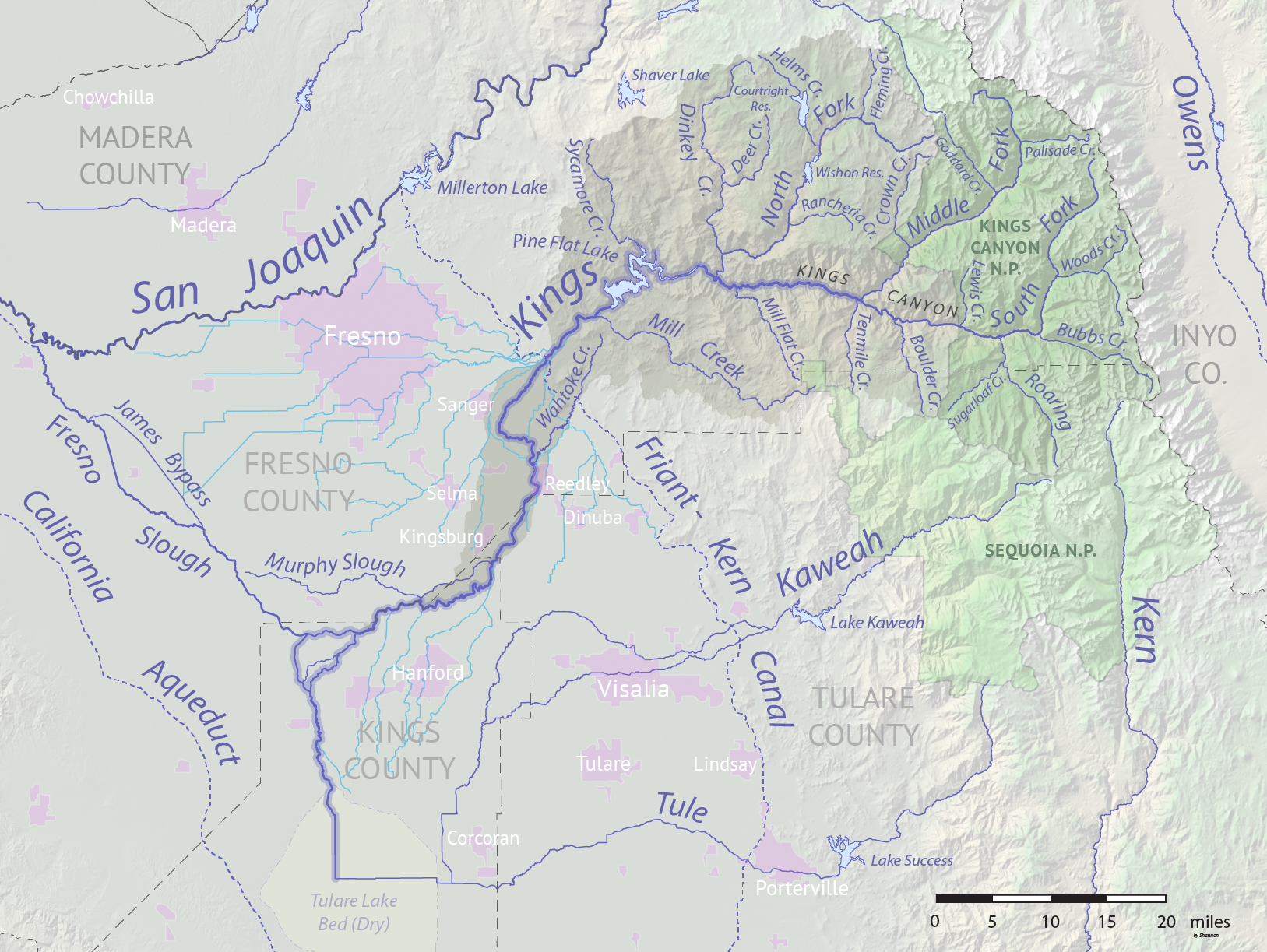
- Map of the Kings River watershed, including Dinkey Creek

Location
- Country: United States
- State: California

Physical characteristics
- Source: Sierra Nevada
  - coordinates: 37°08′44″N 119°03′59″W
  - elevation: 10,152 ft (3,094 m)
- Mouth: North Fork Kings River
  - location: Balch Camp
  - coordinates: 36°54′08″N 119°07′21″W
  - elevation: 1,240 ft (380 m)
- Length: 29.2 mi (47.0 km)
- Basin size: 132 sq mi (340 km^{2})
- Discharge
  - location: near Balch Camp
  - average: 182.4 cu ft/s (5.16 m^{3}/s)
  - minimum: 1.56 cu ft/s (0.044 m^{3}/s)
  - maximum: 4,320 cu ft/s (122 m^{3}/s)

Basin features
- Tributaries
  - left: Bear Creek, Deer Creek
  - right: Cow Creek, Rock Creek, Bull Meadow Creek

Dinkey Creek is a large stream in the southern Sierra Nevada, in Fresno County, California. The creek is 29.2 miles (47.0 km) long, flowing undammed in a southerly direction through the Sierra National Forest. It is a tributary of the North Fork Kings River, in turn part of the Kings River system which drains into the de-watered Tulare Lake bed.

Dinkey Creek originates in the Dinkey Lakes Wilderness, along the Three Sisters peaks, at an elevation of 10,152 feet (3,094 m) above sea level. It initially flows southwest, dropping over Dinkey Falls, then turning south a short distance below Dinkey Dome. It then flows past the community of Dinkey Creek and receives its largest tributary, Deer Creek, from the left. The creek empties into the North Fork Kings River near Balch Camp, at an elevation of 1,240 feet (380 m).

The creek was named in 1863 by a group of hunters who were attacked there by a grizzly bear. The hunters' dog, Dinkey, tried to fight the bear, but was fatally injured. One of the men was then able to grab his gun and shoot the bear. They named the nearby stream Dinkey Creek to honor the dog's bravery.

== Dinkey Creek Hydroelectric Project ==
A hydroelectric project was proposed by the Kings River Conservation District (KRCD) in 1978 on Dinkey Creek, but was canceled just two months before the start of construction in 1986 because PG&E withdrew from the power purchase agreement. That was caused in part by delays caused by environmental litigation challenging parts of the plan, as well as a dispute between PG&E and the California Public Utilities Commission over related environmental issues.

The KRCD's "Dinkey Creek Hydroelectric Project" would have consisted of a 380-foot (120 m) high rock fill dam with a spillway at elevation 5,710 ft (1,740 m), a 90,000 acre⋅ft (110,000,000 m^{3}) reservoir, and two separate 60 megawatt power stations. Construction would have also included 7.9 miles (12.7 km) of power tunnels, and four vertical shafts, and a 4.5 miles (7.2 km) long diversion tunnel in hard, massive, granitic rock. The Dinkey Creek Inn in the community of Dinkey Creek is also located at 5,710 ft (1,740 m) elevation. According to the Bureau of Reclamation; "Adverse environmental impacts would be expected in all categories assessed—botany, wildlife, aquatic biology and water quality, recreation, and land use. In particular, a reservoir at Dinkey Creek would fundamentally alter the existing recreation-based community."

== See also ==
- List of rivers of California
