= Helms Pumped Storage Plant =

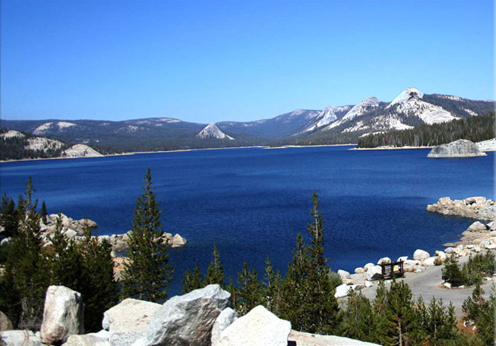
- Courtright, the upper reservoir
- Interactive map of Helms Pumped Storage Plant
- Country: United States
- Location: Fresno County
- Coordinates: 37°02′13″N 118°57′53″W
- Status: Operational
- Construction began: 1977
- Opening date: 1984
- Owner: Pacific Gas and Electric Company

Upper reservoir
- Creates: Courtright Reservoir
- Total capacity: 123,000 acre⋅ft (151,718,266 m^{3})

Lower reservoir
- Creates: Wishon Reservoir
- Total capacity: 129,000 acre⋅ft (159,119,157 m^{3})

Power Station
- Hydraulic head: 1,625 ft (495 m)
- Turbines: 3 x 404 MW Francis pump turbines
- Installed capacity: 1,212 MW

The Helms Pumped Storage Plant is located 50 miles (80 km) east of Fresno, California, in the Sierra Nevada Mountain Range's Sierra National Forest. It is a power station that uses Helms Creek canyon on the North Fork of the Kings River for off-river water storage and the pumped-storage hydroelectric method to generate electricity. After being planned in the early 1970s, construction on the plant began in June 1977 and commercial operations began on 30 June 1984. It has an installed capacity of 1,212 MW and is owned by Pacific Gas and Electric Company.

== Design and operation ==
The power plant operates by moving water between an upper and lower reservoir. When energy demand is high, water is released from the upper reservoir to the generating plant, and the water is discharged into the lower reservoir. When demand is low (such as at night), water is pumped into the upper reservoir to be used as stored energy at a later time. This is accomplished by pump-generators which serve a dual role: the pumps can reverse for use as generators. The plant can go from a standstill to operational in eight minutes, which allows it to meet peak energy demand. It consumes more electricity pumping than generating electricity, but pumping occurs during periods of low demand with unused surplus energy available at lower costs from the electric grid.

The upper reservoir, Courtright Reservoir, has a storage capacity of 123,000 acre⋅ft (151,718,266 m^{3}) and is at an altitude of 8,184 ft (2,494 m). Wishon Reservoir, the lower reservoir, has a storage capacity of 129,000 acre⋅ft (159,119,157 m^{3}). It is at an altitude of 6,550 ft (1,996 m). Connecting the reservoirs, from upper to lower, is first a 10,511-foot-long (3,204 m) headrace tunnel which turns into a 2,248-foot-long (685 m) steel penstock, which drops in elevation and splits into three individual penstocks, which each feed a separate pump-generator. After the water has passed through the generating turbines, it is discharged into the lower reservoir via a 3,797-foot-long (1,157 m) tailrace tunnel. The difference in elevation between the reservoirs has an effective hydraulic head (drop of the water) of 1,625 ft (495 m). The underground power station is near Wishon Reservoir and houses three 404 MW Francis pump turbine-generators.

The Helms Pumped Storage project was designed to be used with the Diablo Canyon Nuclear Power Plant, also owned by PG&E, in the 1970s, when Diablo Canyon was being designed and permitted. It is connected to that power plant by a dedicated high-voltage power line.

== See also ==
- List of pumped-storage hydroelectric power stations
