= Wishon Dam =

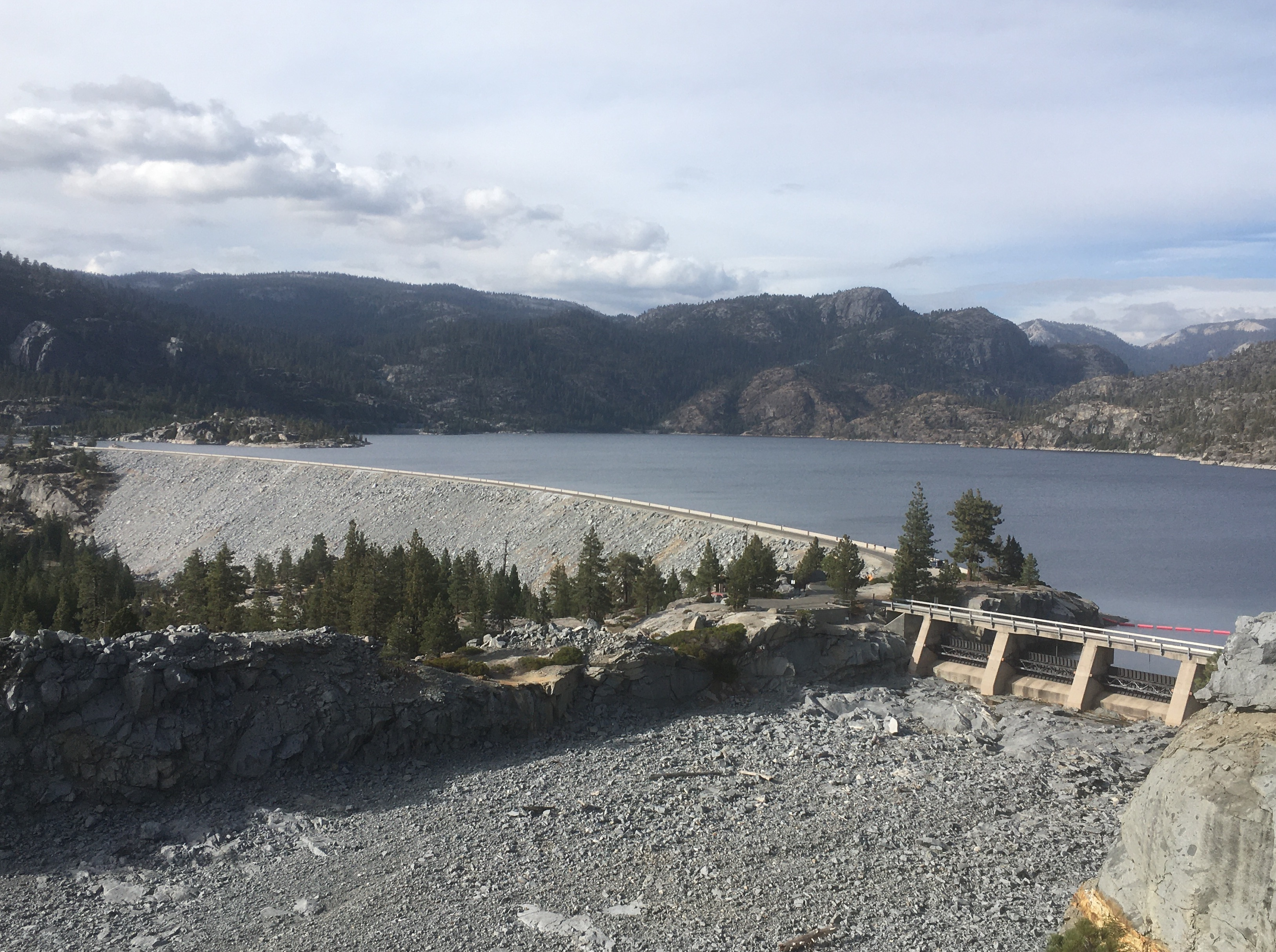
- Wishon Dam (left) and spillway (right)

- Location of Wishon Dam in California
- Coordinates: 37°00′11″N 118°58′00″W
- Purpose: Hydroelectricity
- Opening date: 1958

Dam and spillways
- Type of dam: Rockfill
- Impounds: North Fork Kings River
- Height (foundation): 265 ft (81 m)
- Length: 3,328 ft (1,014 m)
- Elevation at crest: 6,554.7 ft (1,997.9 m)
- Dam volume: 3,700,000 yd^{3} (2,800,000 m^{3})

Reservoir
- Creates: Wishon Reservoir
- Total capacity: 118,000 acre⋅ft (146,000,000 m^{3})
- Catchment area: 177 mi^{2} (460 km^{2})
- Surface area: 970 acres (390 ha)

Haas Powerhouse
- Hydraulic head: 850 ft (260 m)
- Installed capacity: 128 MW
- Annual generation: 447,850,000 KWh (2001–2012)

Wishon Dam (National ID # CA00411) is a dam in Fresno County, California in the Sierra National Forest, in the Sierra Nevada Mountain Range. It impounds the North Fork Kings River to form Wishon Reservoir.

The earthen and rockfill gravity dam was constructed in 1958 (68 years ago) by Pacific Gas and Electric Company (PG&E) with a height of 260 feet (79 m) and a length of 3,330 feet (1,010 m) at its crest. Wishon Dam and its companion Courtright Dam, which stands about five miles to the north, along with other smaller auxiliary gravity dam structures, are elements of PG&E's Haas-Kings River Project.

Courtright Reservoir serves as the upper reservoir for the Helms Pumped Storage Plant. Wishon Reservoir is the lower. During times of peak demand for electricity, which is also when it is most expensive, water is drained from Courtright Reservoir, run through the 1,212 MW Helms Power Plant and emptied into Wishon Reservoir. When demand and prices for electricity are low, water is pumped from Wishon Reservoir to Courtright Reservoir using the power plant's reversible turbines. Helms Power Plant is 1,000 feet (300 m) underground in a chamber carved out of solid granite at the north end of Wishon Lake. It is similar to Southern California Edison's Eastwood Powerhouse near Shaver Lake, which is also a pumped-storage plant.

The reservoir Wishon Dam creates, Wishon Reservoir, has a maximum capacity of 128,606 acre-feet. PG&E maintains Lily Pad Campground with 15 campsites on the southern shore, and recreation includes fishing (for German brown, rainbow or Eastern Brook trout), boating, camping and hiking. The area north of the dam that is now covered by the reservoir was known as Coolidge Meadows prior to the construction of the dam.

== See also ==
- List of dams and reservoirs in California
- List of lakes in California
