= Helms Creek =

River in California, USA

Coordinates: 37°03′01″N 118°56′40″W

Helms Creek is a tributary of the North Fork Kings River in Fresno County, California. The stream drains a remote mountainous part of the Sierra National Forest. The Courtright Dam on Helms Creek forms the 123,300-acre-foot (152,100,000 m^{3}) Courtright Reservoir, which is the upper reservoir for the Helms Pumped Storage Plant.
