= Balch Camp, California =

Unincorporated community in California, United States

Balch Camp
- Unincorporated community
- Location in California Balch Camp (the United States)
- Coordinates: 36°54′11″N 119°07′23″W
- Country: United States
- State: California
- County: Fresno
- Elevation: 1,273 ft (388 m)

Balch Camp is an unincorporated community in Fresno County, California, United States. It is located near the confluence of the North Fork of the Kings River and Dinkey Creek, 38 miles (61 km) east-northeast of Fresno, at an elevation of 1273 feet (388 m).

Balch Camp serves as the headquarters for PG&E's three Kings River hydroelectric powerhouses. In 1980, the community was said to have a year-round population of 45 and the smallest elementary school in Fresno County.

== Climate ==
Balch Camp has a hot-summer Mediterranean climate (Csa) typical of the Sierra Nevada foothills, with hot, dry summers and cool, wet winters.

Climate data for Balch Camp, California, 1991–2020 normals, extremes 1962–2022
Month	Jan	Feb	Mar	Apr	May	Jun	Jul	Aug	Sep	Oct	Nov	Dec	Year
Record high °F (°C)	71 (22)	79 (26)	88 (31)	92 (33)	103 (39)	106 (41)	112 (44)	111 (44)	109 (43)	102 (39)	84 (29)	68 (20)	112 (44)
Mean maximum °F (°C)	62.2 (16.8)	67.8 (19.9)	77.6 (25.3)	83.1 (28.4)	90.3 (32.4)	97.1 (36.2)	102.3 (39.1)	103.1 (39.5)	100.1 (37.8)	91.2 (32.9)	72.7 (22.6)	61.5 (16.4)	105.0 (40.6)
Mean daily maximum °F (°C)	52.1 (11.2)	56.1 (13.4)	63.0 (17.2)	68.4 (20.2)	76.6 (24.8)	85.1 (29.5)	92.9 (33.8)	93.3 (34.1)	88.3 (31.3)	76.7 (24.8)	60.1 (15.6)	50.9 (10.5)	72.0 (22.2)
Daily mean °F (°C)	45.5 (7.5)	48.1 (8.9)	53.2 (11.8)	57.5 (14.2)	65.0 (18.3)	73.0 (22.8)	80.8 (27.1)	81.2 (27.3)	76.1 (24.5)	65.5 (18.6)	52.5 (11.4)	44.6 (7.0)	61.9 (16.6)
Mean daily minimum °F (°C)	38.8 (3.8)	40.1 (4.5)	43.3 (6.3)	46.5 (8.1)	53.5 (11.9)	61.0 (16.1)	68.8 (20.4)	69.2 (20.7)	63.8 (17.7)	54.4 (12.4)	44.9 (7.2)	38.4 (3.6)	51.9 (11.1)
Mean minimum °F (°C)	29.4 (−1.4)	30.9 (−0.6)	33.3 (0.7)	35.0 (1.7)	42.4 (5.8)	49.3 (9.6)	60.7 (15.9)	61.5 (16.4)	52.0 (11.1)	43.4 (6.3)	34.7 (1.5)	29.1 (−1.6)	27.1 (−2.7)
Record low °F (°C)	20 (−7)	22 (−6)	27 (−3)	23 (−5)	22 (−6)	35 (2)	46 (8)	50 (10)	39 (4)	32 (0)	29 (−2)	18 (−8)	18 (−8)
Average precipitation inches (mm)	5.55 (141)	4.91 (125)	5.05 (128)	2.56 (65)	1.41 (36)	0.40 (10)	0.22 (5.6)	0.05 (1.3)	0.24 (6.1)	1.36 (35)	2.14 (54)	4.66 (118)	28.55 (725)
Source 1: NOAA
Source 2: National Weather Service
