= Dinkey Creek, California =

Unincorporated community in California, United States

Dinkey Creek
- Unincorporated community
- Location in California Dinkey Creek (the United States)
- Coordinates: 37°05′10″N 119°09′27″W
- Country: United States
- State: California
- County: Fresno
- Elevation: 5,988 ft (1,825 m)

Dinkey Creek is an unincorporated community in Fresno County, California, United States. It is located on Dinkey Creek, at an elevation of 5987 feet (1825 m).

A post office operated at Dinkey Creek from 1925 to 1972. Dinkey was the name of a dog who lost a fight with a grizzly bear.

The community was home to Camp Mar-Y-Mac, which operated from 1951 to 1981.
