= Courtright Reservoir =

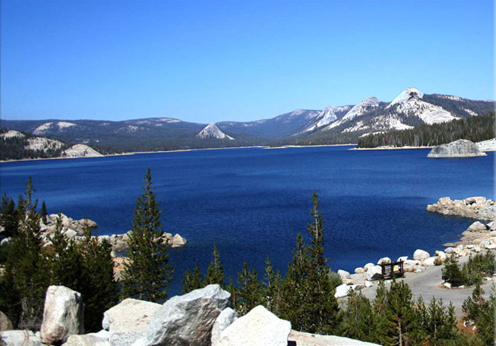

- Location within California Location within the United States

- Aerial Photo of Courtright Reservoir
- Location: Fresno County, California
- Coordinates: 37.10297°N 118.97387°W
- Type: Reservoir
- Primary inflows: Helms Creek
- Primary outflows: Helms Creek
- Basin countries: United States
- Max. length: 3.36 mi (5.41 km)
- Max. width: 5,234 ft (1,595 m)
- Water volume: 123,300 acre-feet (152,100,000 m^{3})
- Surface elevation: 8,170 feet (2,490 m)

Courtright Reservoir is a reservoir in Fresno County, California. The reservoir is at an elevation of 8,170 feet (2,490 m) in the Sierra National Forest, in the Sierra Nevada Mountain Range, bordering the John Muir Wilderness and the Dinkey Lakes Wilderness.

The high Sierra reservoir is formed by Courtright Dam in Helms Creek canyon and has a capacity of 123,300 acre-feet (152,100,000 m^{3}). The dam is composed of rock-fill and is 315 feet (96 m) tall, measured from the crest to the original streambed. It was completed in 1958 (68 years ago) and is owned by Pacific Gas and Electric. In 1984 the Helms Pumped Storage Powerhouse was added to the reservoir allowing it to pump water from Wishon to Courtright. Its primary purpose is hydroelectricity production.

The lake is an "off-river" (or "off-channel") storage reservoir. In addition to the small amount of conventional hydroelectricity production from the flow of Helms Creek, Courtright Reservoir serves mainly as the upper reservoir for the Helms Pumped Storage Plant. Wishon Reservoir, an on-channel reservoir a couple of miles downstream on the Kings River, is the lower reservoir and main water source. During times of peak demand for electricity, when it is most expensive, water is drained from Courtright Reservoir, run through the 1,212 MW Helms Power Plant and empties into Wishon Reservoir. When demand and prices for electricity are low, water is pumped from Wishon Reservoir to Courtright Reservoir using the power plant's reversible turbines. Helms Power Plant is 1,000 feet (300 m) underground in a chamber carved out of solid granite at the north end of Wishon Lake. It is similar to Southern California Edison's Eastwood Powerhouse near Shaver Lake, which is also a pumped-storage plant.

Courtright Reservoir is a haven for weekend and outdoor enthusiasts seeking to camp, fish, hike, boat, swim, rock climb, and 4x4 among others. It is surrounded by unique domes of granite that are essentially in the center of the Sierra Batholith and are highly sought after by rock climbers from all around. It is also used during warmer-weather months by local astronomers, such as members of the Central Valley Astronomers, who take advantage of its 8,170 feet (2,490 m) elevation and excellent location for night sky viewing free from light and air pollution.

As with many outdoor areas there are some animal transmittable diseases to be aware of. Ticks in the area have been known infect people with the bacterium that causes tick-borne relapsing fever. The yellow-bellied marmot is known to carry cryptosporidium, which can be infectious to humans. Additionally due to the elevation and the thinner atmosphere there has been slightly higher but not dangerous levels of radiation recorded here.

== See also ==
- List of dams and reservoirs in California
- List of lakes in California
