= Indigenous peoples of California =

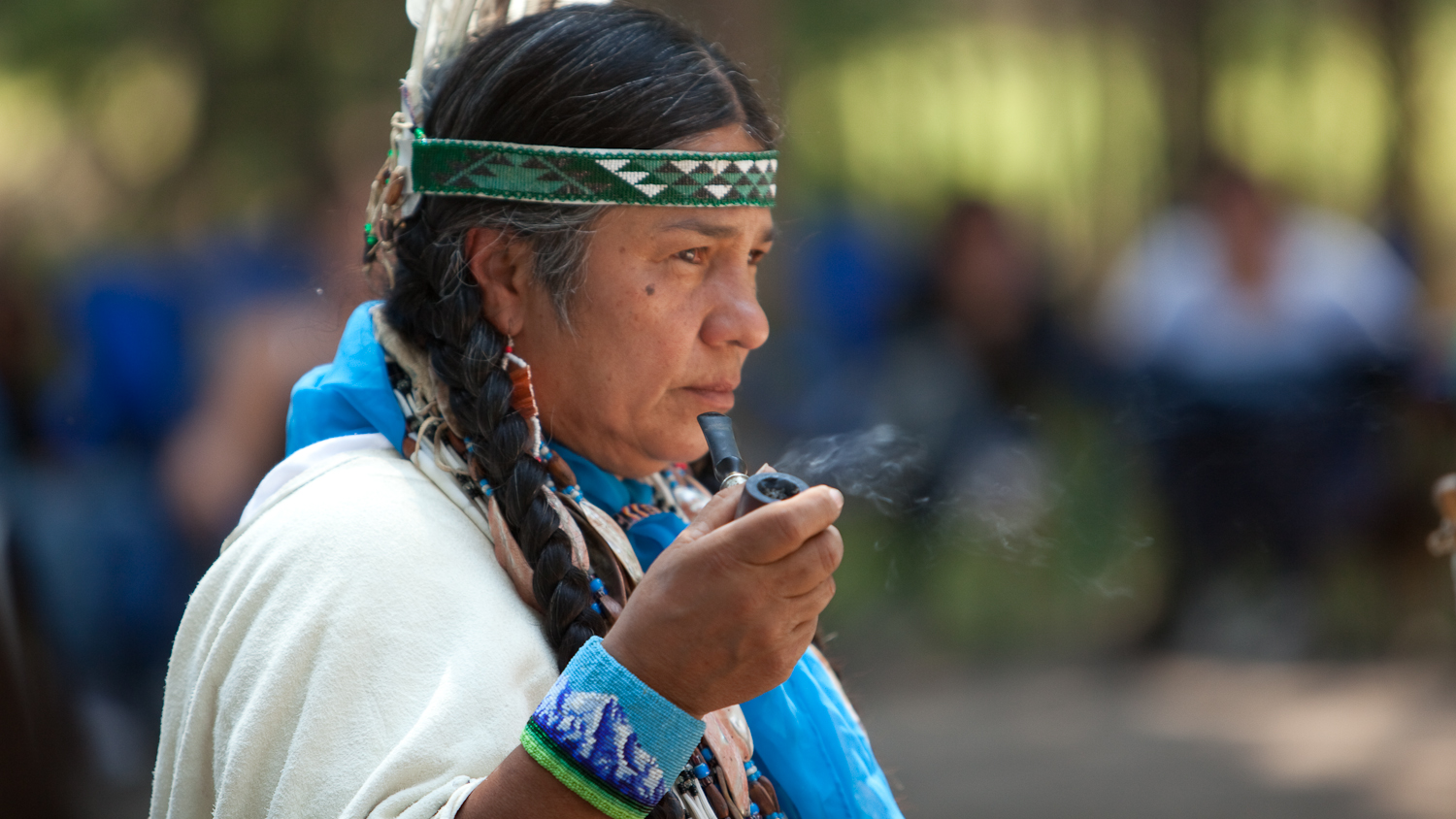
Winnemem Wintu chief Caleen Sisk in 2009

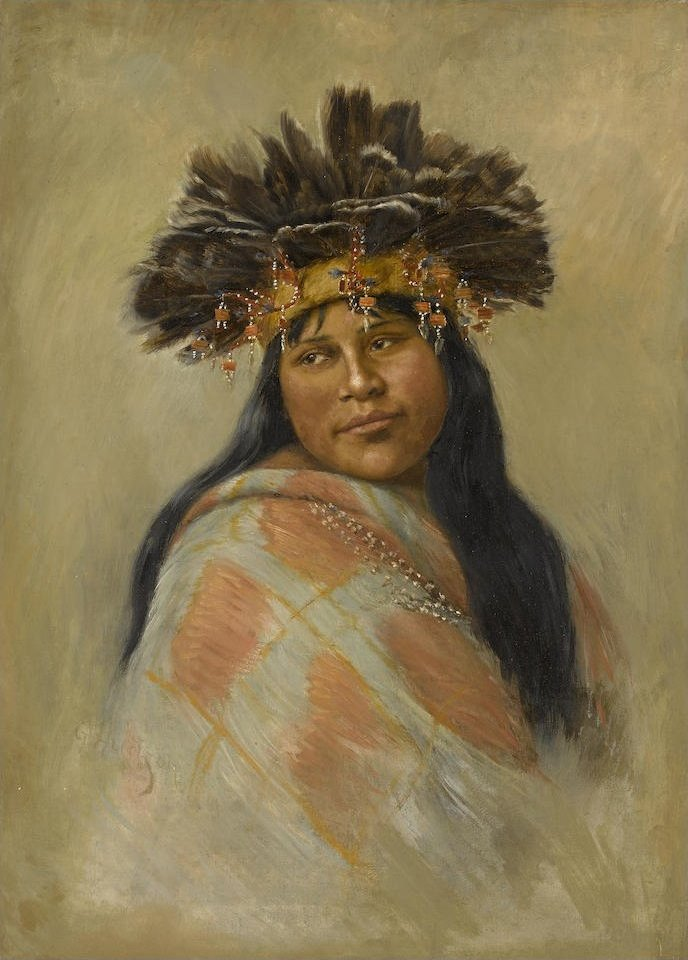
A representation of a Pomo dancer, painting by Grace Hudson

Indigenous peoples of California, commonly known as Indigenous Californians or Native Californians, are a diverse group of nations and peoples that are indigenous to the geographic area within the current boundaries of California before and after European colonization. There are currently 109 federally recognized tribes in the state and over forty self-identified tribes or tribal bands that have applied for federal recognition. According to the 2020 US Census, California has the largest number of Native Americans and the third largest population (by percent) in the United States.

Most tribes practiced forest gardening or permaculture and controlled burning to ensure the availability of food and medicinal plants as well as ecosystem balance. Archeological sites indicate human occupation of California for thousands of years. European settlers began exploring their homelands in the late 18th century. This began with the arrival of Spanish soldiers and missionaries who established Franciscan missions that instituted an immense rate of death and cultural genocide.

Following California statehood, a state-enabled policy of elimination was carried out against its aboriginal people known as the California genocide in the establishment of Anglo-American settler colonialism. The Native population reached its lowest in the early 20th century while cultural assimilation into white society became imposed through Indian boarding schools. Native Californian peoples continue to advocate for their cultures, homelands, sacred sites, and their right to live.

In the 21st century, language revitalization began among some California tribes. The Land Back movement has taken shape in the state with more support to return land to tribes. There is a growing recognition by California of Native peoples' environmental knowledge to improve ecosystems and mitigate wildfires.

== Classification ==
The traditional homelands of many tribal nations may not conform exactly to the state of California's boundaries. Many tribes on the eastern border with Nevada have been classified as Great Basin tribes, while some tribes on the Oregon border are classified as Plateau tribes. Tribes in Baja California who do not cross into California are classified as Indigenous peoples of Mexico. The Kumeyaay nation is split by the Mexico-United States border.

== History ==
=== Indigenous ===
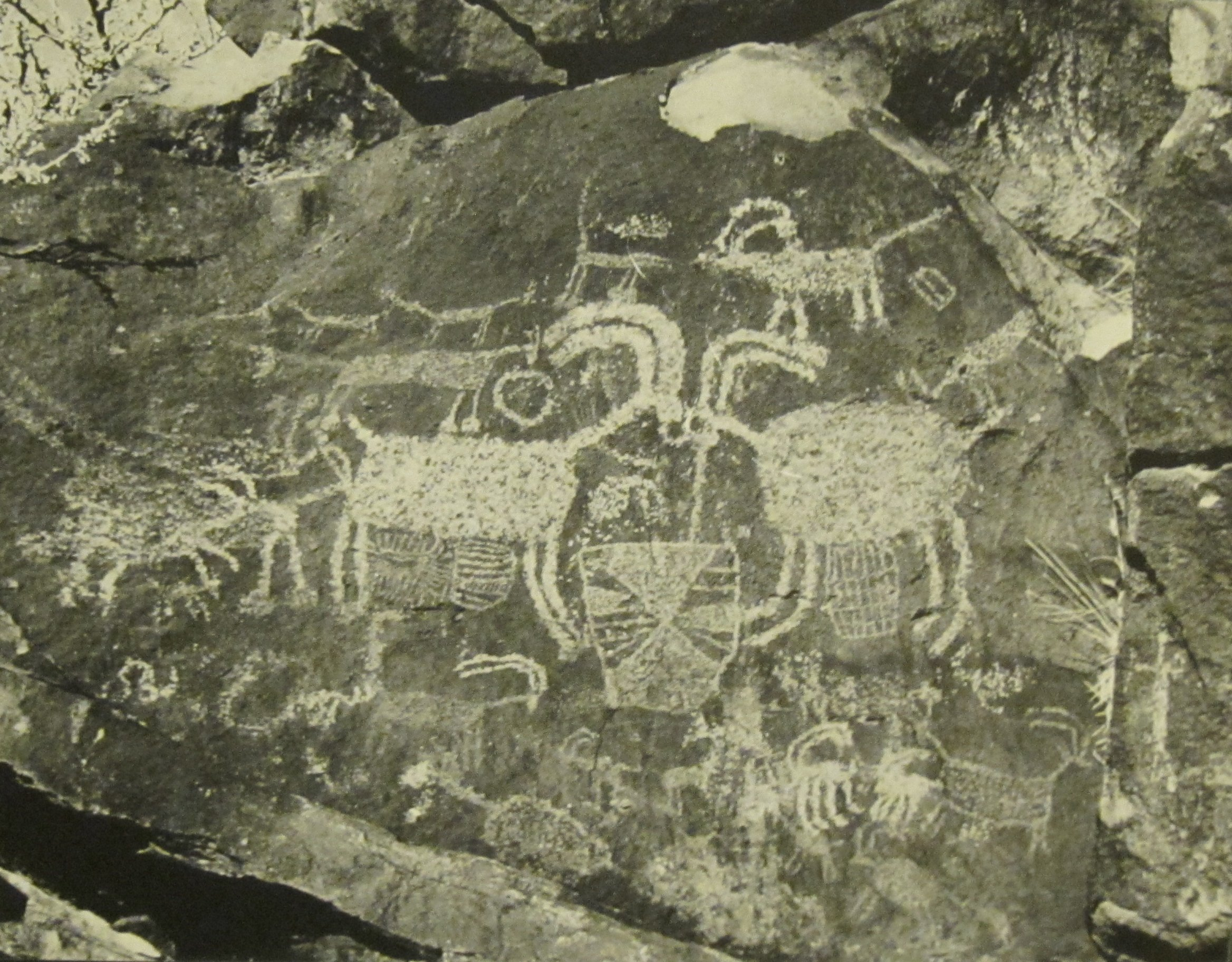
The Coso Rock Art District in the Mojave Desert contains about 100,000 petroglyphs.

Evidence of human occupation of California dates from at least 19,000 years ago. Archeological sites with dates that support human settlement in period 12,000–7,000 ybp are: Borax Lake, the Cross Creek Site, Santa Barbara Channel Islands, Santa Barbara Coast's Sudden Flats, and the Scotts Valley site, CA-SCR-177. The Arlington Springs Man is an excavation of 10,000-year-old human remains in the Channel Islands. Marine shellfish remains associated with Kelp Forests were recovered in the Channel Island sites and at other sites such as Daisy Cave and Cardwell Bluffs dated between 12,000 and 9000 cal BP.

Prior to European contact, Indigenous Californians had 500 distinct sub-tribes or groups, each consisting of 50 to 500 individual members. The size of California tribes today are small compared to tribes in other regions of the United States. Prior to contact with Europeans, the California region contained the highest Native American population density north of what is now Mexico. Because of the temperate climate and easy access to food sources, approximately one-third of all Native Americans in the United States were living in the area of California.

Early Native Californians were hunter-gatherers, with seed collection becoming widespread around 9,000 BCE. Two early southern California cultural traditions include the La Jolla complex and the Pauma Complex, both dating from c. 6050–1000 BCE. From 3000 to 2000 BCE, regional diversity developed, with the peoples making fine-tuned adaptations to local environments. Traits recognizable to historic tribes were developed by approximately 500 BCE.

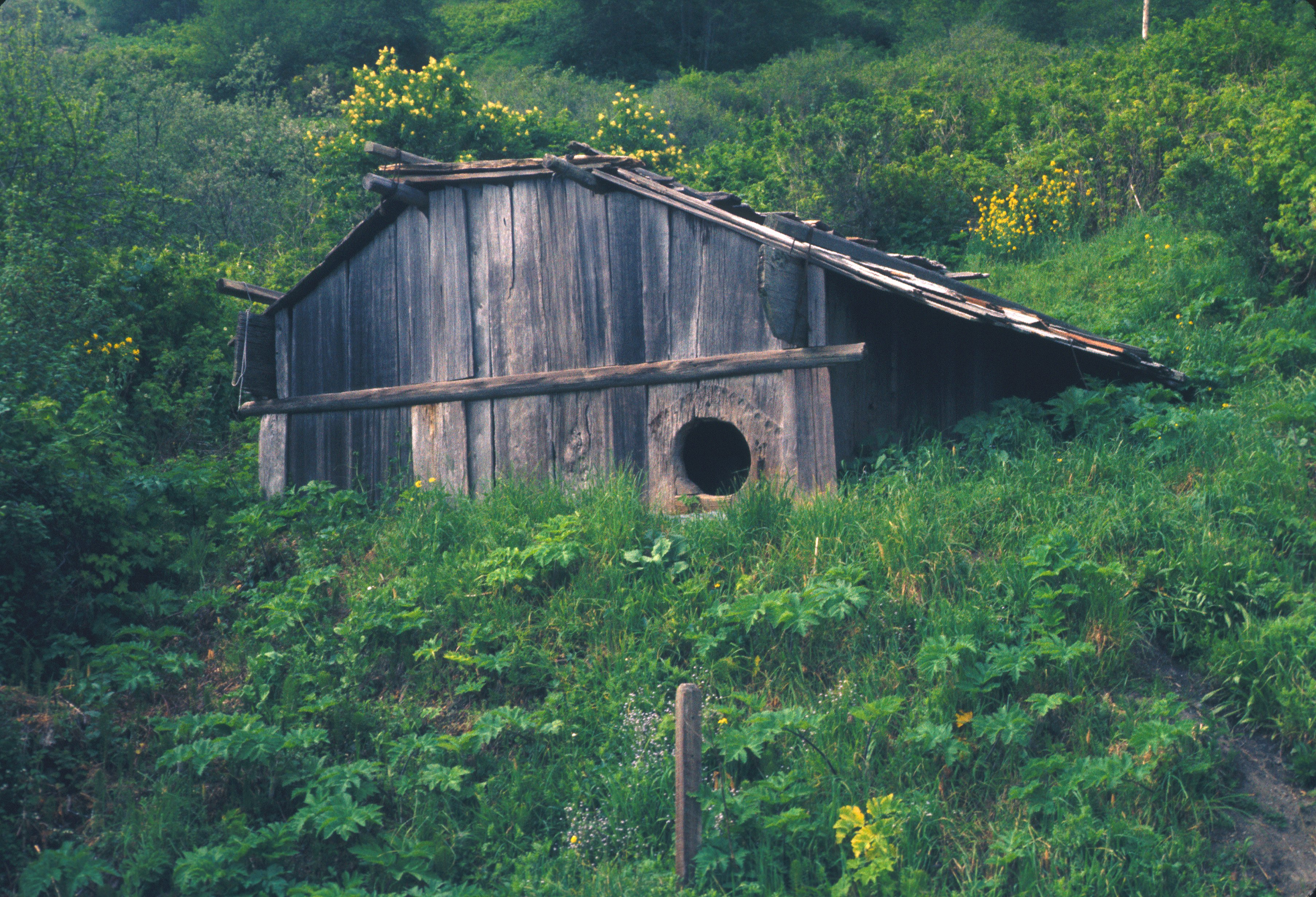
A reconstruction of a traditional Yurok plank house.

The Indigenous people practiced various forms of sophisticated forest gardening in the forests, grasslands, mixed woodlands, and wetlands to ensure availability of food and medicine plants. They controlled fire on a regional scale to create a low-intensity fire ecology; this prevented larger, catastrophic fires and sustained a low-density "wild" agriculture in loose rotation. By burning underbrush and grass, the Native people revitalized patches of land and provided fresh shoots to attract food animals. A form of fire-stick farming was used to clear areas of old growth to encourage new in a repeated cycle; a permaculture.

=== Contact with Europeans ===
Different tribes encountered non-Native European explorers and settlers at widely different times. The southern and central coastal tribes encountered European explorers in the mid-16th century. Tribes such as the Quechan or Yuman Indians in present-day southeast California and southwest Arizona first encountered Spanish explorers in the 1760s and 1770s. Tribes on the coast of northwest California, like the Miwok, Yurok, and Yokut, had contact with Russian explorers and seafarers in the late 18th century. In remote interior regions, some tribes did not meet non-Native people until the mid-19th century.

=== Late 18th century: Missions and decline ===
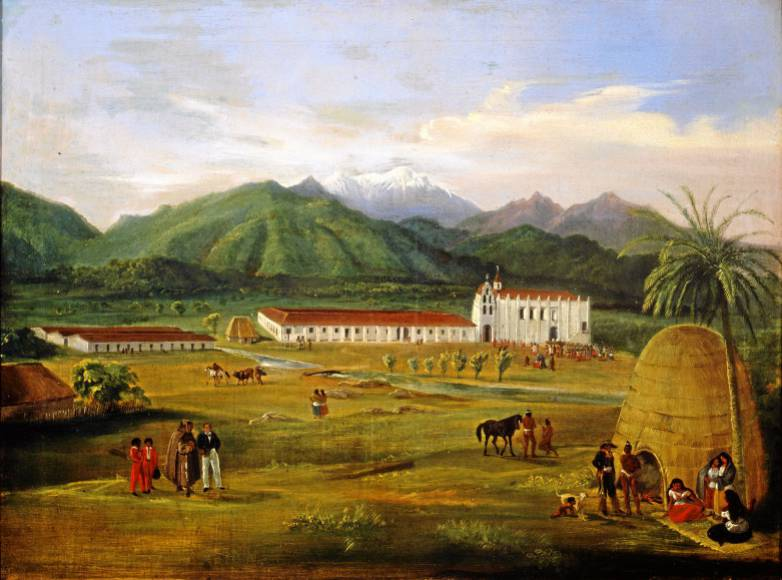
A painting representing Mission San Gabriel Arcángel with Tongva dwellings in the foreground. The mission recorded 7,854 baptisms and 5,656 deaths. A clerk of Jedidiah Smith described the conditions of Native people as "they are complete slaves in every sense of the word."

At the time of the establishment of the first Spanish Mission in 1769, the most widely accepted estimates say that California's Indigenous population was around 340,000 people and possibly more. The Indigenous peoples of California were extremely diverse and made up of ten different linguistic families with at least 78 distinct languages. These are further broken down into many dialects, while the people were organized into sedentary and semi-sedentary villages of 400–500 micro-tribes.

The Spanish began their long-term occupation in California in 1769 with the founding of Mission San Diego de Alcalá in San Diego. The Spanish built 20 additional missions in California, most of which were constructed in the late 18th century. From 1769 to 1832, an estimated total of 87,787 baptisms and 24,529 marriages had been conducted at the missions. In that same period, 63,789 deaths at the missions were recorded, indicating the immense death rate. This massive drop in population has been attributed to the introduction of diseases, which rapidly spread while Native people were forced into close quarters at the missions, as well as torture, overworking, and malnourishment at the missions.

The missions also introduced European invasive plant species as well as cattle grazing practices that significantly transformed the California landscape, altering Native people's relationship to the land as well as key plant and animal species that had been integral to their ways of life and worldviews for thousands of years. The missions further perpetuated cultural genocide against Native people through enforced conversion to Christianity and the prohibition of numerous cultural practices under threat of violence and torture, which were commonplace at the missions.

=== 19th century: genocide ===
The population of Native California was reduced by 90% during the 19th century—from more than 200,000 in the early 19th century to approximately 15,000 at the end of the century. The majority of this population decline occurred in the latter half of the century, under United States occupation. While in 1848, the population of Native people was about 150,000, by 1870 it fell to 30,000, and fell further to 16,000 by the end of the century.

The mass decline in population has been attributed to disease and epidemics that swept through Spanish missions in the early part of the century, such as an 1833 malaria epidemic, among other factors including state-enabled massacres that accelerated under Anglo-American rule.

==== Russian contacts (1812–1841) ====
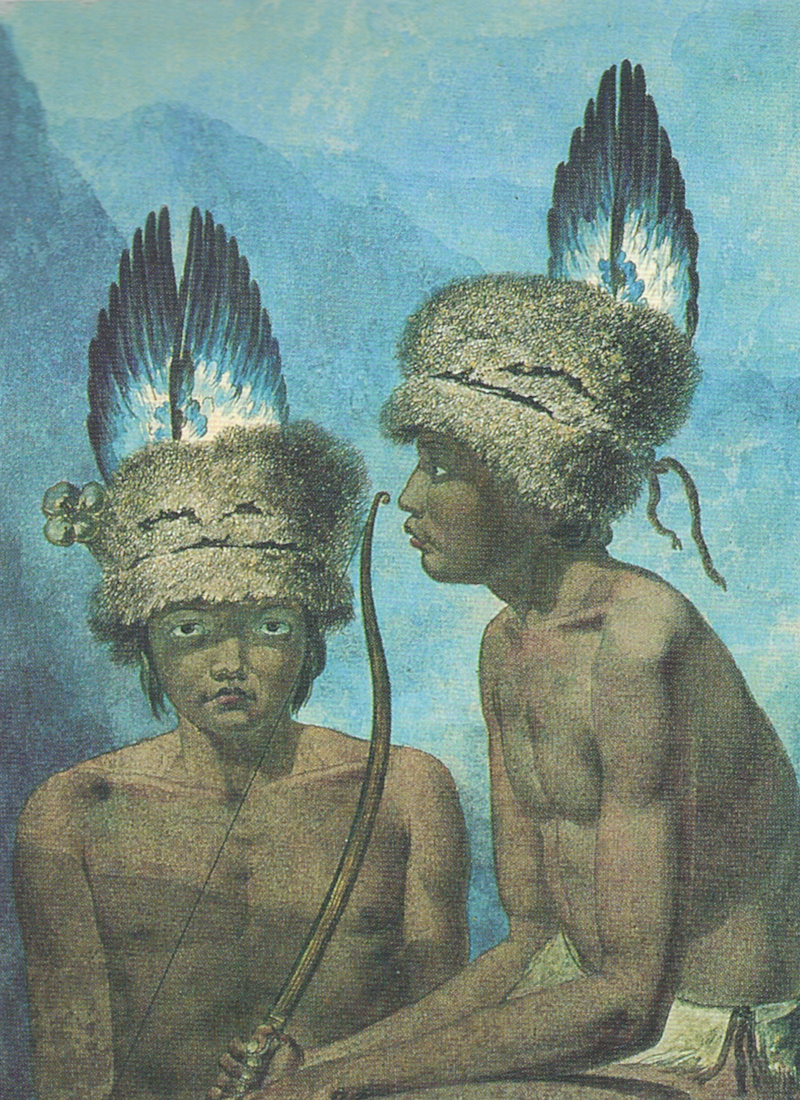
A painting representing Balthazar, Inhabitant of Northern California (1818), by Mikhail Tikhanov.

In the early 19th century, Russian exploration of California and contacts with Indigenous people were usually associated with the activity of the Russian-American Company. The Russian explorer Baron Ferdinand von Wrangell, visited California in 1818, 1833, and 1835. Looking for a potential site for a new outpost of the company in California in place of Fort Ross, Wrangell's expedition encountered Native people north of San Francisco Bay. He noted that local women, who were used to physical labor, seemed to be of stronger constitution than men, whose main activity was hunting. He summarized his impressions of the California Indians as a people with a natural propensity for independence, inventive spirit, and a unique sense of the beautiful.

Another notable Russian expedition to California was the 13-month-long visit of the scientist Ilya Voznesensky in 1840–1841. Voznesensky's goal was to gather some ethnographic, biological, and geological materials for the collection of the Imperial Academy of Sciences. He described the locals that he met on his trip to Cape Mendocino as "the untamed Indian tribes of New Albion, who roam like animals and, protected by impenetrable vegetation, keep from being enslaved by the Spanish".

==== Mexican secularization (1833–1848) ====
After about a decade of conservative rule in the First Mexican Republic, which formed in 1824 after Mexico gained independence from the Spanish Empire in 1821, a liberal sect of the First Mexican Republic passed an act to secularize the missions, which effectively ended religious authority over Native people in Alta California. The legislation was primarily passed from liberal sects in the Mexican government, including José María Luis Mora, who believed that the missions prevented Native people from accessing "the value of individual property."

The Mexican government did not return the lands to tribes, but made land grants to settlers of at least partial European ancestry, transforming the remaining parts of mission land into large land grants or ranchos. Secularization provided Native people with the opportunity to leave the mission system, yet left many people landless, who were thus pressured into wage labor at the ranchos. The few Indigenous people who acquired land grants were those who have proven their Hispanicization and Christianization. This was noted in the land acquisition of Victoria Reid, an Indigenous woman born at the village of Comicranga.

==== American settler colonialism (1848–) ====
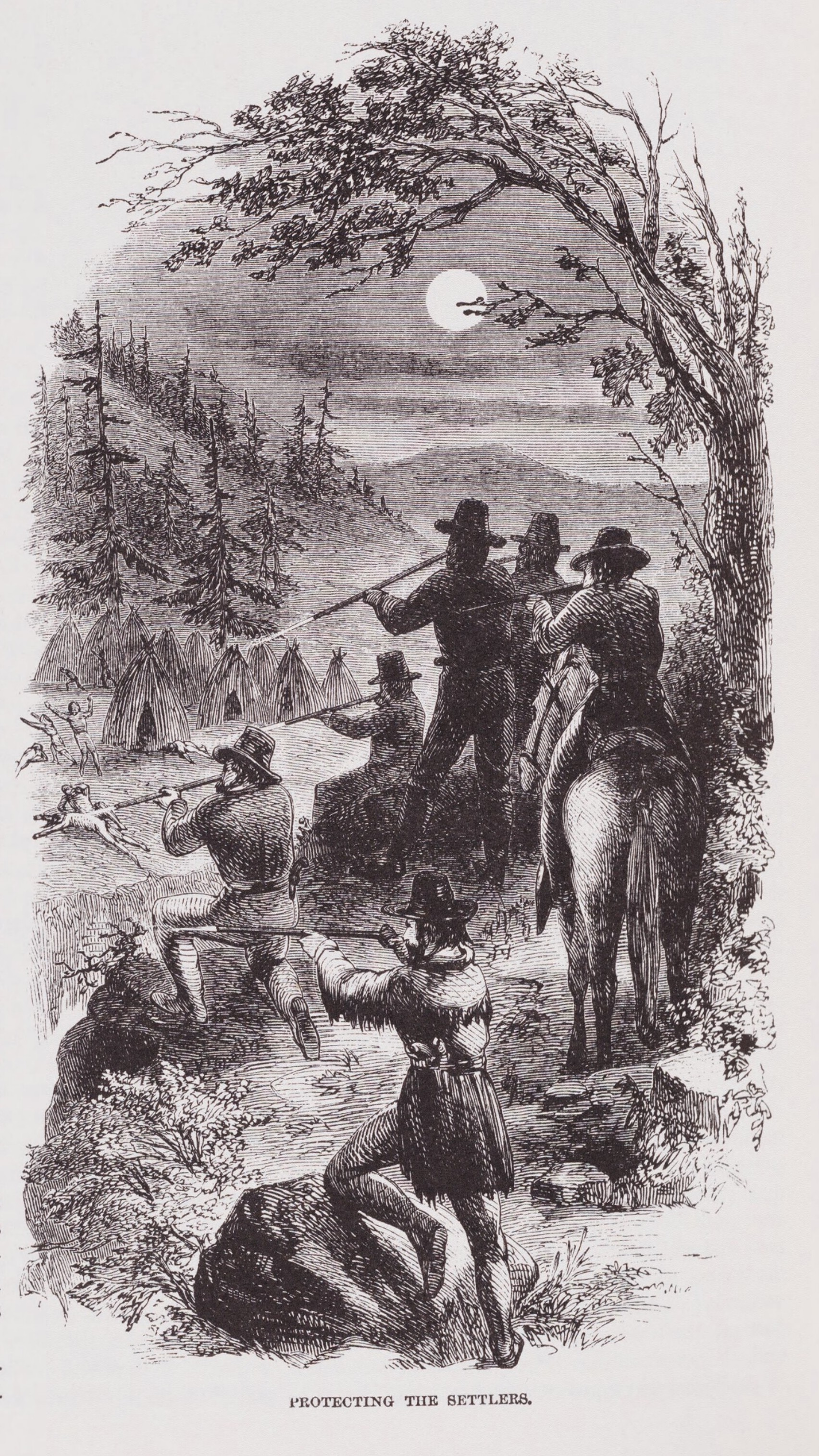
"Protecting the Settlers," illustration by John Ross Browne (1864)

Following the Mexican–American War, Peter Hardenman Burnett was elected as the first governor of the state of California in 1848. As American settlers came in control of California with the signing of the Treaty of Guadalupe Hidalgo, its administrators honored some Mexican land grant titles, but did not honor aboriginal land titles.

With this shift in power, the American settlers embraced a policy of elimination toward Indigenous people in California. In his second state address in 1851, Burnett framed an eliminatory outlook toward Native people as one of defense for the property of white settlers:

The white man, to whom time is money, and who labors hard all day to create the comforts of life, cannot sit up all night to watch his property; and after being robbed a few times, he becomes desperate, and resolve upon a war of extermination. This is a common feeling among our people who have lived upon the Indian frontier ... That a war of extermination will continue to be waged between the races until the Indian race becomes extinct must be expected. While we cannot anticipate this result but with painful regret, the inevitable destiny of the race is beyond the power or wisdom of man to avert.

Some local communities like the city of Shasta authorized "five dollars for every Indian head." In this period, 303 volunteer militia groups of 35,000 men were formed by the settlers.

In the fiscal year of 1851–1852, California reimbursed approximately $1 million of expenses for militia groups engaged in "the suppression of Indian hostilities", although in fact, they were massacring Native people. Volunteer militia groups were also indirectly subsidized by the U.S. federal government, who reimbursed money to the state for the militias.

==== California Gold Rush and forced labor (1848–1855) ====
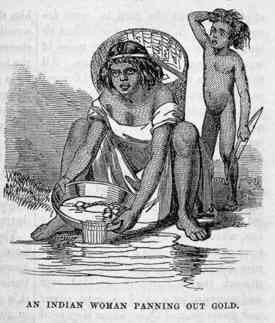
1850 depiction of a Native woman panning for gold in the California Gold Rush. Forced labor of Native people in California was common during the gold rush, permitted by the 1850 Act for the Government and Protection of Indians.

Most of inland California including California deserts and the Central Valley was in possession of Native people until the acquisition of Alta California by the United States. The discovery of gold at Sutter's Mill in 1848 inspired a mass migration of Anglo-American settlers into areas where Native people had avoided sustained encounters with invaders. The California Gold Rush involved a series of massacres and conflicts between settlers and the Indigenous peoples of California lasting from about 1846 to 1873 that is generally referred to as the California genocide.

The negative impact of the California Gold Rush on both the local Indigenous inhabitants and the environment were substantial, decimating the people still remaining. 100,000 Native people died during the first two years of the gold rush alone.

Settlers took land both for their camps and to farm and supply food for their camps. The surging mining population resulted in the disappearance of many food sources. Toxic waste from their operations killed fish and destroyed habitats. Settlers viewed Indigenous people as obstacles for gold, so they actively went into villages where they raped the women and killed the men.

Sexual violence against Native women and young girls was a normal part of white settler life, who were often forced into prostitution or sex slavery. Kidnappings and rape of Native women and girls was reported as occurring "daily and nightly." This violence against women often provoked attacks on white settlers by Native men.

Forced labor was also common during the Gold Rush, permitted by the 1850 Act for the Government and Protection of Indians. Part of this law instituted the following as a legal practice:

Any person could go before a Justice of Peace to obtain Indian children for indenture. The Justice determined whether or not compulsory means were used to obtain the child. If the Justice was satisfied that no coercion occurred, the person obtain a certificate that authorized him to have the care, custody, control and earnings of an Indian until their age of majority (for males, eighteen years, for females, fifteen years).

Raids on Native villages were common, where adults and children were threatened with fatal consequence for refusing what was essentially slavery. Although this was in legal terms illegal, the law was established not to help protect Indigenous people, so there were rarely interventions to stop kidnappings and the circulation of stolen children into the market by law enforcement. What were effectively slave auctions occurred where laborers could be "purchased" for as low as 35 dollars.

A central location for auctions was Los Angeles, where an 1850 city ordinance passed by the Los Angeles City Council allowed prisoners to be "auctioned off to the highest bidder for private service." Historian Robert Heizer referred to this as "a thinly disguised substitute for slavery." Auctions continued as a weekly practice for nearly twenty years until there were no Native people left to sell.

==== American unratified treaties (1851–1852) ====
The United States Senate sent a group of consultants, Oliver Wozencraft, George Barbour, and Redick McKee to make treaties with the Indigenous peoples of California in 1851. Leaders throughout the state signed 18 treaties with the government officials that guaranteed 7.5 million acres of land (or about 1/7th of California) in an attempt to ensure the future of their peoples amid encroaching settler colonialism. Anglo-American settlers in California responded with dissatisfaction and contempt at the treaties, believing Native people were being reserved too much land. Despite making agreements, the U.S. government sided with the settlers and tabled the treaties without informing the signees. They remained shelved and were never ratified.

==== California genocide (1846–1873) ====
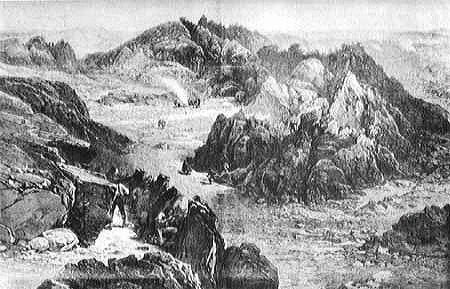
1873 sketch by William Simpson of Modoc fighters at Captain Jack's Stronghold.

The California genocide continued after the California Gold Rush period. By the late 1850s, Anglo-American militias were invading the homelands of Native people in the northern and mountainous areas of the state, which had avoided some earlier waves of violence due to their more remote locations. Near the end of the period associated with the California genocide, the final stage of the Modoc Campaign was triggered when Modoc men led by Kintpuash (AKA Captain Jack) murdered General Canby at the peace tent in 1873. However, it's not widely known that between 1851 and 1872 the Modoc population decreased by 75 to 88% as a result of seven anti-Modoc campaigns started by the whites.

There is evidence that the first massacre of the Modocs by non-Native people took place as early as 1840. According to the story told by a chief of the Achumawi tribe (neighboring to Modocs), a group of trappers from the north stopped by the Tule lake around the year 1840 and invited the Modocs to a feast. As they sat down to eat, the cannon was fired and many Indians were killed. The father of Captain Jack was among the survivors of that attack. Since then the Modocs resisted the intruders notoriously. Additionally, when in 1846 the Applegate Trail cut through the Modoc territory, the migrants and their livestock damaged and depleted the ecosystem that the Modoc depended on to survive.

=== 20th century: Forced assimilation ===
By 1900, the population of Native people who survived the eliminatory policies and acts carried out in the 19th century was estimated at 16,000 people. Remaining Native people continued to be the recipients of the U.S. policies of cultural genocide throughout the 20th century. Many other Native people would experience false claims that they were "extinct" as a people throughout the century.

==== Indian removal in California (1903) ====
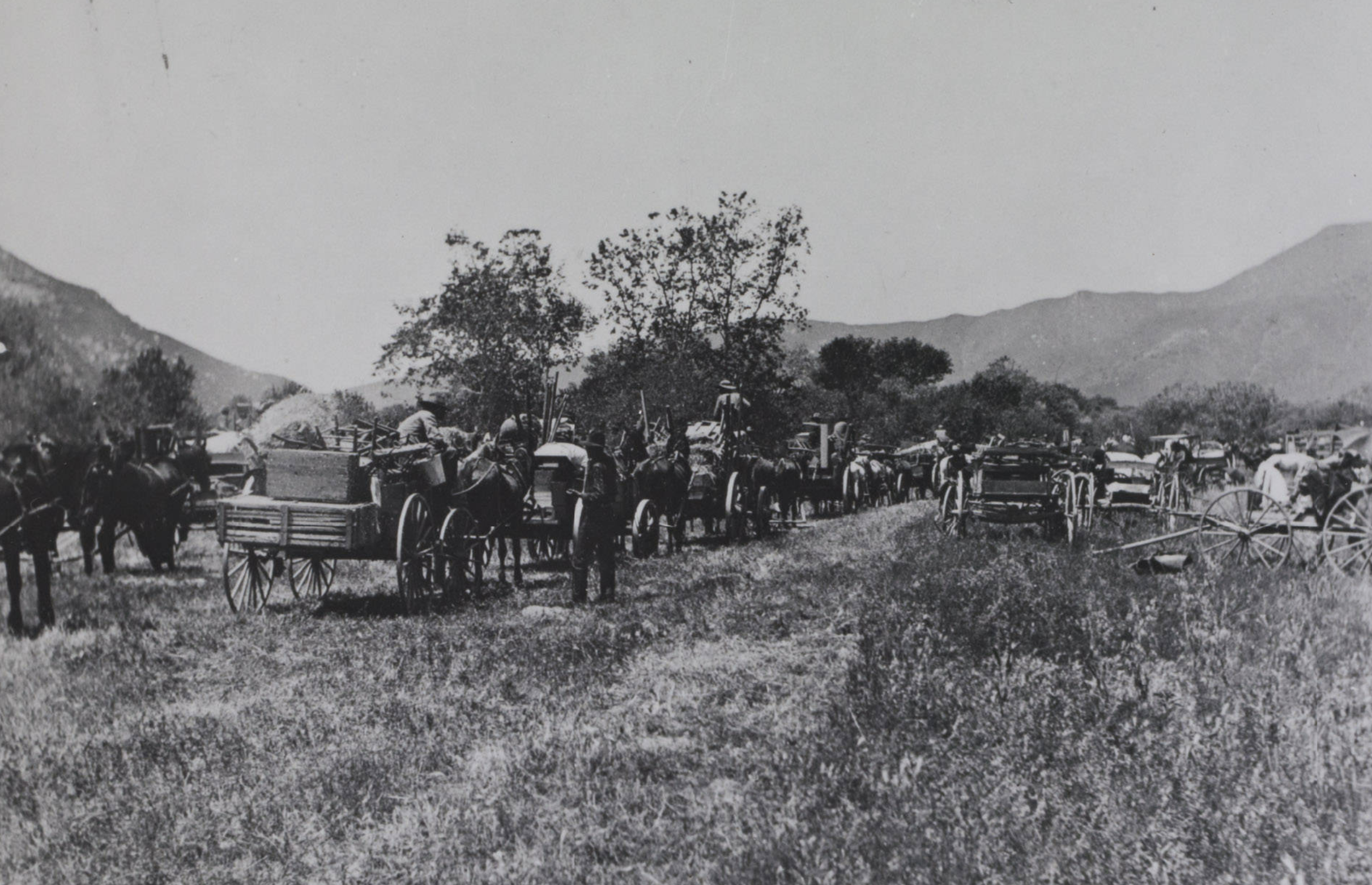
Cupeño trail of tears (1903)

Although the American policy of Indian removal to force Indigenous peoples off of their homelands had begun much earlier in the United States in 1813, it was still being implemented as late as 1903 in Southern California. The last Native removal in U.S. history occurred in what has been referred to as the Cupeño trail of tears, when the people were forced off of their homeland by white settlers, who sought ownership of what is now Warner Springs. The people were forced to move 75 miles from their home village of Cupa to Pala, California. The forced removal under threat of violence also included Luiseño and Kumeyaay villages in the area.

==== Indian boarding schools in California (1892–1935) ====
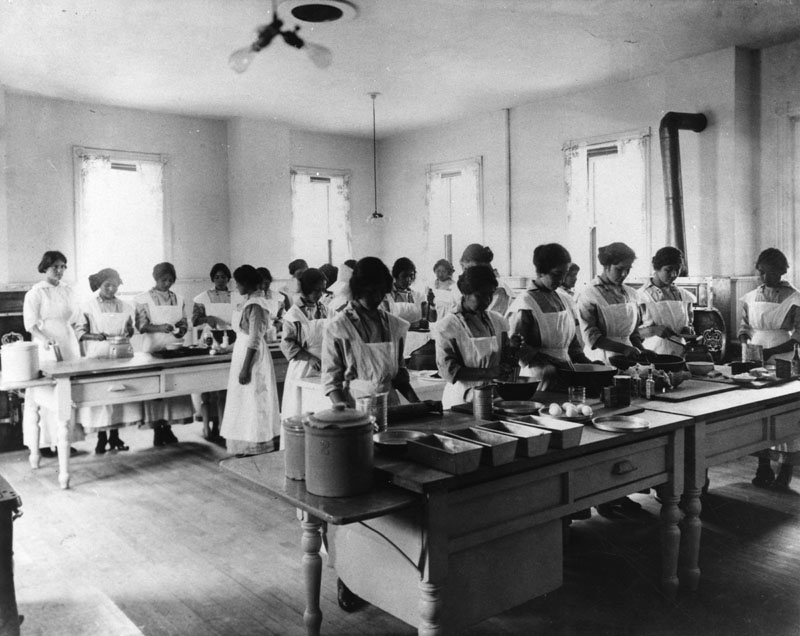
Native girls in a domestic class at the Sherman Boarding School in Riverside, California (1915)

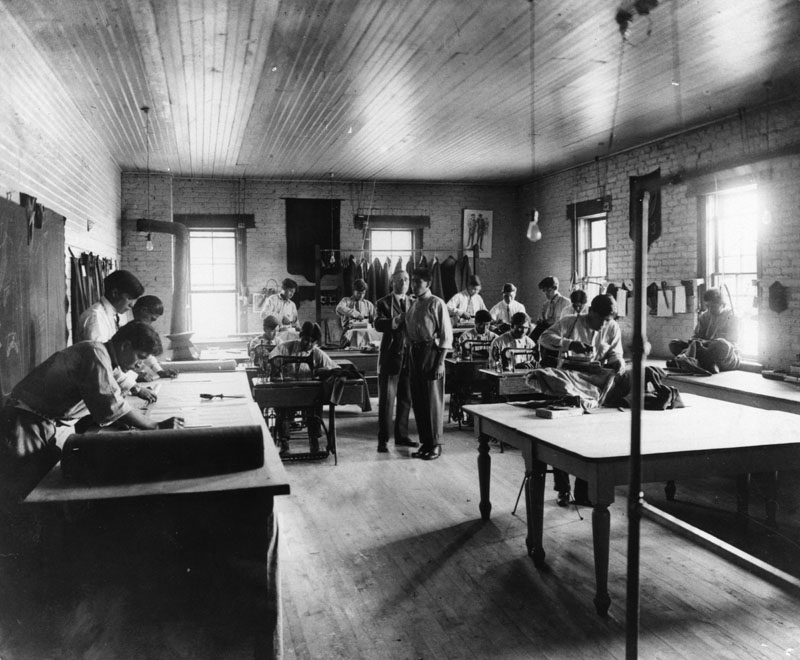
Native boys in tailor class at the Sherman Institute (1915)

During the end of the 19th century and the beginning of the 20th century, the government attempted to force Indigenous peoples to further break the ties with their culture and assimilate into white society. In California, the federal government established such forms of education as the reservation day schools and American Indian boarding schools. Three of the twenty-five off-reservation Indian boarding schools were in California, and ten schools total.

New students were customarily bathed in kerosene and their hair was cut upon arrival. Poor ventilation and nutrition and diseases were typical problems at schools. In addition to that, most parents disagreed with the idea of their children being raised as whites, with students being forced to wear European style clothes and haircuts, given European names, and strictly forbidden to speak Indigenous languages. Sexual and physical abuse at the schools was common.

By 1926, 83% of all Native American children attended the boarding schools. Native people recognized the American Indian boarding schools as institutionalized forces of elimination toward their native culture. They demanded the right for their children to access public schools. In 1935, restrictions that forbid Native people from attending public schools were removed.

It was not until 1978 that Native people won the legal right to prevent familial separation that was integral to Native children being brought to the boarding schools. This separation often occurred without knowledge by parents, or under white claims that Native children were "unsupervised" and were thus obligated to the school, and sometimes under threatening circumstances to families.

==== Unratified treaties reimbursement (1944–1946) ====
Since the 1920s, various Indian activist groups were demanding that the federal government fulfill the conditions of the 18 treaties of 1851–1852 that were never ratified and were classified. In 1944 and in 1946, Native peoples brought claims for reimbursements asking for compensations for the lands affected by treaties and Mexican land grants. They won $17.5 million and $46 million, respectively. Yet, the land agreed to in the treaties was not returned.

==== Religious Freedom Act in California (1978–) ====
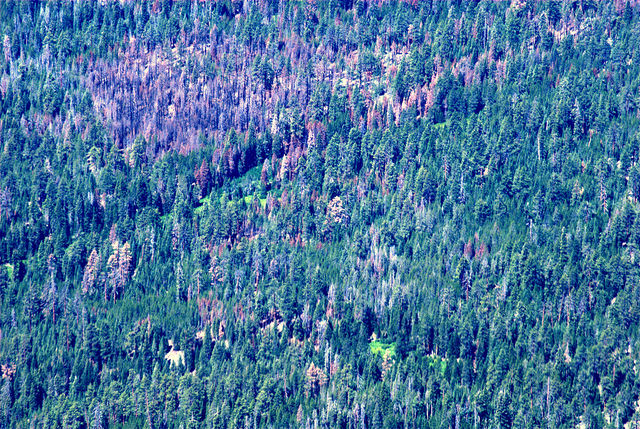
Native people's relationship to forests, gathering, and species protection remains largely prohibited and obstructed despite the American Indian Religious Freedom Act (1978)

The American Indian Religious Freedom Act was passed by the U.S. government in 1978, which gave Indigenous people some rights toward practicing their religion. In practice, this did not extend or include religious freedom in regard to Indigenous people's religious relationship to environmental sites or their relationship with ecosystems. Religion tends to be understood as separate from the land in American Judeo-Christian terms, which differs from Indigenous terms. While in theory religious freedom was protected, in practice, religious or ceremonial sites and practices were not protected.

In 1988, Lyng v. Northwest Indian Cemetery Protective Ass'n the U.S. Supreme Court sided with the U.S. Forest Service to build a road through a forest used for religious purposes by three nearby tribal nations in northwestern California. This was despite the recommendations of the expert witness on the matter, who stated that the construction of the road would destroy the religions of the three tribes. However, no protection was provided through the Religious Freedom Act.

The National Park Service mandates a no-gathering policy for cultural or religious purposes and the United States Forest Service (USFS) requires a special permit and fee, which prohibits Native people's religious freedom. A 1995 mandate that would have provided conditional opportunities for gathering for this purpose failed to pass. Pesticide use in forests, such as the dropping of 11,000 pounds of granular hexazinone on 3,075 acres of the Stanislaus National Forest in 1996 by the USFS, deformed plants and sickened wildlife that are culturally and religiously significant to Native people.

=== 21st century ===
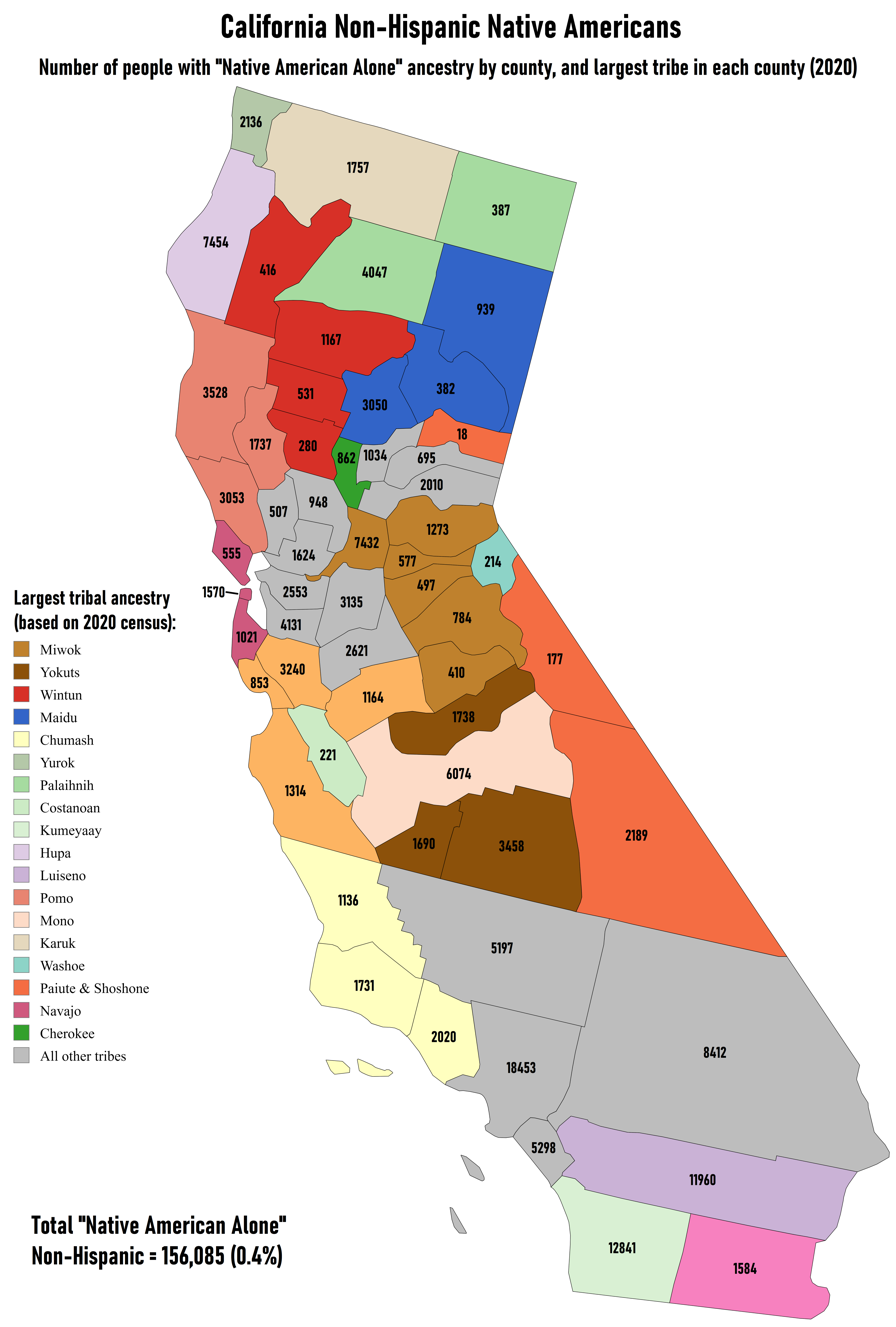
Largest Non-Hispanic Native American ancestry by county and numbers of people reporting "Native American Alone"

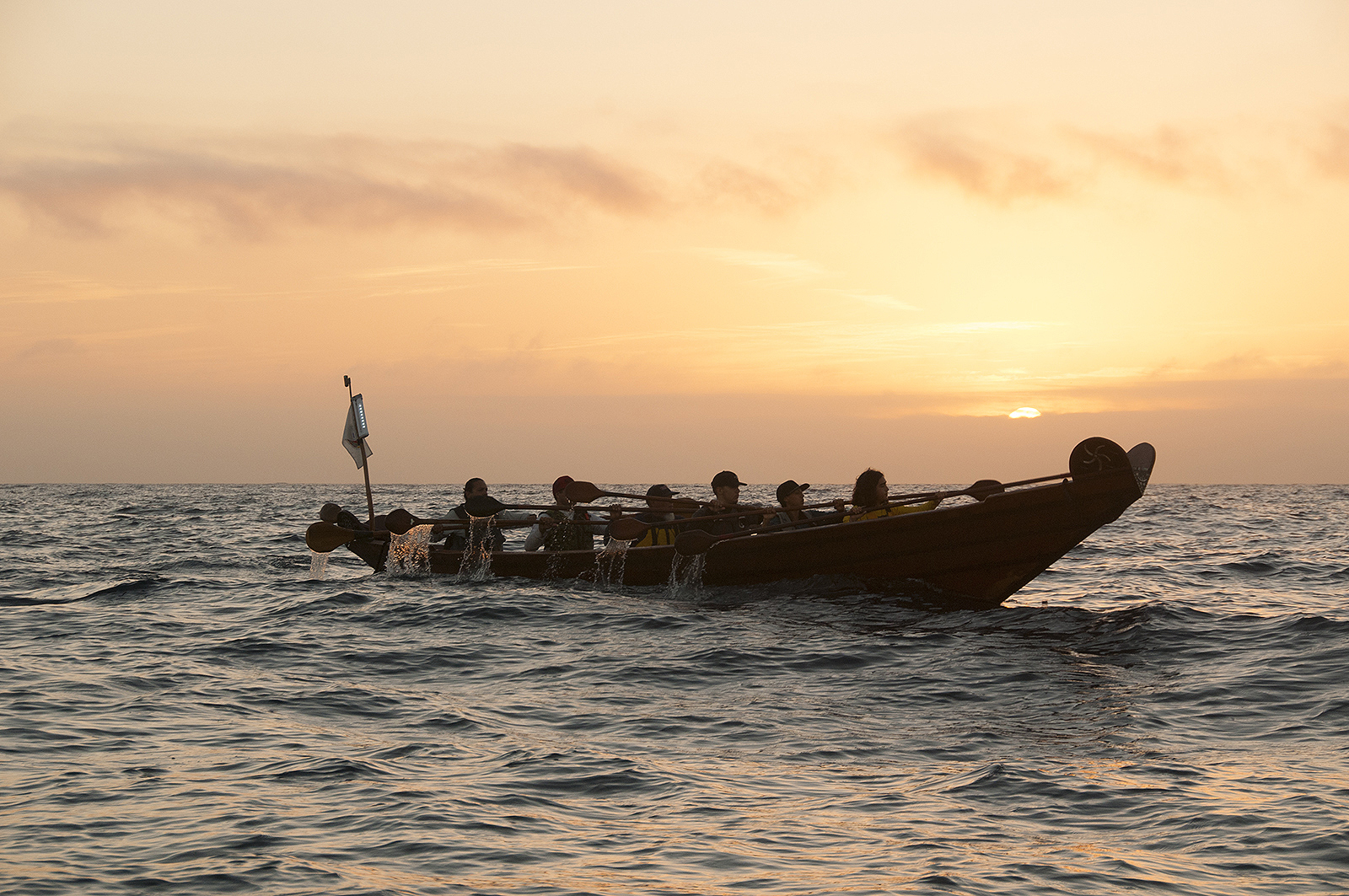
Chumash paddlers navigate a tomol near Santa Cruz Island (2015)

California has the largest population of Native Americans out of any state, with 1,252,083 identifying an "American Indian or Alaska Native" tribe as a component of their race (14.6% of the nationwide total). This population grew by 15% between 2000 and 2010, much less than the nationwide growth rate of 27%, but higher than the population growth rate for all races, which was about 10% in California over that decade. Over 50,000 Indigenous people live in Los Angeles alone.

However, the majority of Indigenous people in California today do not identify with the tribes indigenous to the state, rather they are of Indigenous Mexican or Central American ancestry, or of tribes from other parts of the United States, such as the Cherokee or Navajo. Of the state's 934,970 Indigenous people who specified a Native American tribe, 297,708 identified as "Mexican American Indian", 125,344 identified as "Central American Indian", and 125,019 identified as Cherokee. 108,319 identified with "all other tribes," which includes all of the Indigenous Californian tribes except for the Yuman/Quechan, who numbered 2,759 in the state.

According to the National Conference of State Legislatures, there are currently over one hundred federally recognized Native groups or tribes in California including those that spread to several states. Federal recognition officially grants the Indian tribes access to services and funding from the Bureau of Indian Affairs, and Federal and State funding for Tribal TANF/CalWORKs programs.

==== Recognition as genocide (2019) ====
Gavin Newsom's apology to California Native people (2019)

The California genocide was not acknowledged as a genocide by non-Native people for over a century in California. In the 2010s, denial among politicians, academics, historians, and institutions such as public schools was commonplace. This has been credited to a lingering unwillingness of settler descendants who are "beneficiaries of genocidal policies (similar to throughout the United States generally)." This meant that the genocide was largely dismissed, distorted, and denied, sometimes through trivialization or even humor to create a self-positive image of settlers.

In 2019, 40th governor of California, Gavin Newsom signed an executive order formally apologizing to Native people and for the formation of a Truth and Healing Council that would be "aimed at reporting on the historical relationships between the state and its Indigenous people." Of this history, Newsom stated: "Genocide. No other way to describe it, and that's the way it needs to be described in the history books." This was a significant event in reducing the dismissal of the California genocide.

==== Language reawakening ====
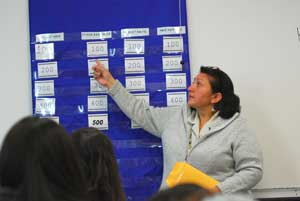
Instructor teaching the Yurok language (2014)

After a long decline of Indigenous language speakers as a result of violent punitive measures for speaking Indigenous languages at Indian boarding schools and other forms of cultural genocide, some Indigenous languages are being reawakened. Indigenous language revitalization in California has gained momentum among several tribes. There are some obstacles that remain, such as intergenerational trauma, funding, lack of access to records, and conversational regularity. Some languages with the most success are Chumash, Kumeyaay, Tolowa Dee-niʼ, Yurok, and Hoopa.

Cheryl Tuttle, a Native American Studies Director and Wailaki teacher, commented that language revitalization can be both important for speakers themselves and for the homelands:

For tens of thousands of years, the land had been prayed to and became accustomed to the Yuki and Wailaki languages. Not only do the people need the wisdom contained in the language, but the land misses hearing the people and needs to hear those healing songs and prayers again.

==== Prison-industrial complex ====
Native people, and particularly Native women, are disproportionately incarcerated in California. Some Native people identify the modern prison-industrial complex as another reproduction of the "punishing institutions" that have been imposed onto them and built on their homelands since the arrival of European settlers, including military forts, ranchos, Spanish missions, Indian reservations, boarding schools, and prisons, each of which exploited Native people as a source of labor for the economic interests of settlers. Prison labor in California has also been compared to California's history of forced labor of Indigenous people.

==== Burial sites, remains, and cultural items ====
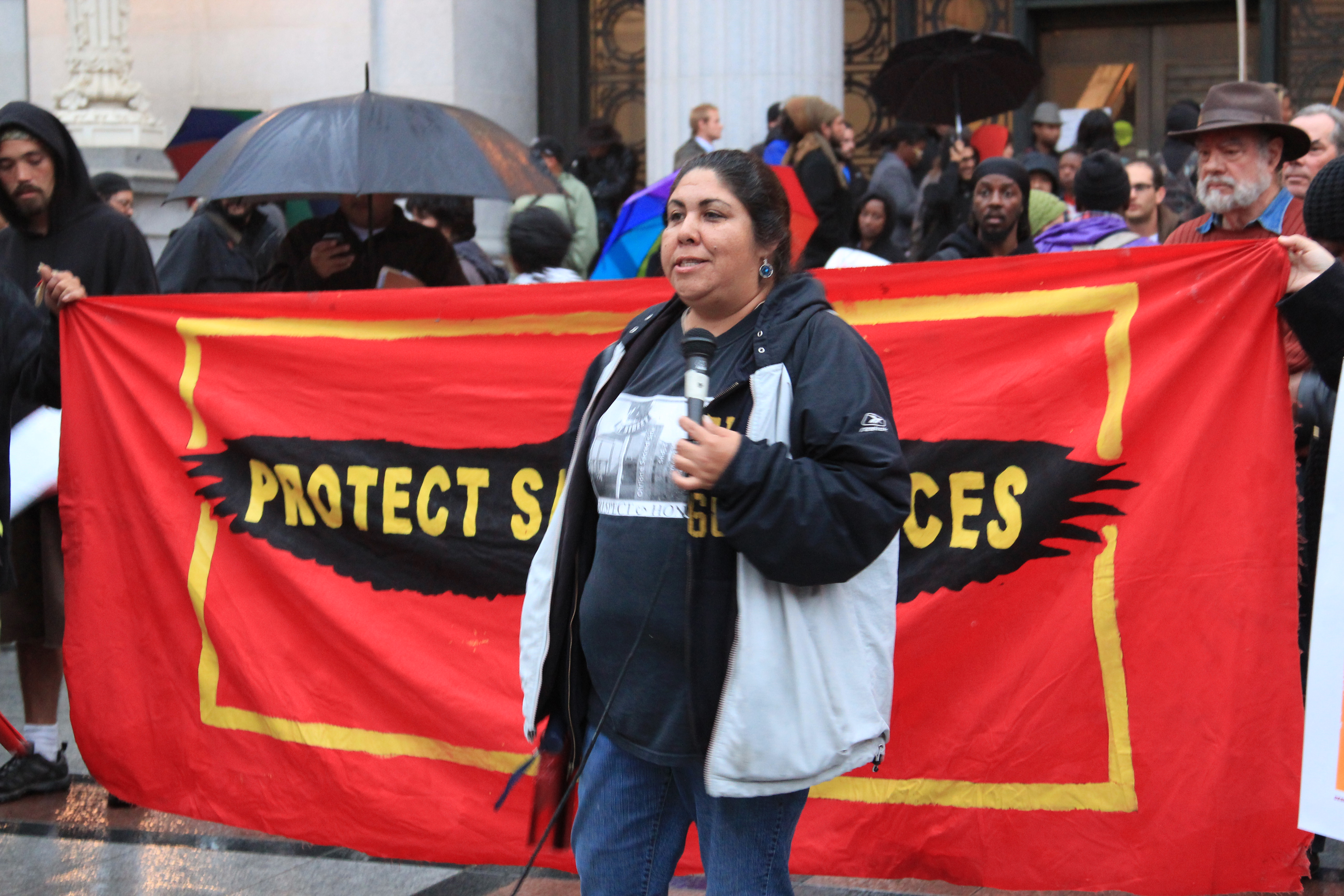
Corrina Gould (2011), a Chochenyo and Karkin woman who advocates to stop the destruction of the site of the West Berkeley Shellmound.

In 1990, federally recognized tribes gained some rights to ancestral remains with the Native American Graves Protection and Repatriation Act. The similar California Native American Graves Protection and Repatriation Act is an act that requires all state agencies and museums that receive state funding and that have possession or control over collections of humans remains or cultural items to provide a process for identification and repatriates of these items to appropriate tribes.

This protection to ancestral remains does not prevent development on Indigenous burial grounds, just a temporary consultation and return of remains or artifacts found. Tribes and tribal bands in urbanized or high-development areas, such as the Tongva (Los Angeles), Acjachemen (Orange County), and Ohlone (San Francisco Bay Area) struggle to protect burial grounds, village sites, and artifacts from disturbance and desecration, usually from residential and commercial developments, which has been a feature of daily life for Native people in California since the arrival of European settlers.

Along the middle reaches of Marsh Creek near the modern day city of Brentwood lies land that was once occupied by the Bay Miwok speaking peoples more specifically the Volvon tribelet. Radiocarbon dates at the burial site estimate that the individuals were interred around 5,000 to 3,000 BP (3,000 to 1,000 BCE). In the earliest periods of the Black Marsh occupation, individuals were buried in an extended position facing north if on the east side of the site and south if on the west side. Observations by researchers suggest that individuals were not interned based on their sex or age, leading some archaeologists to assume a more culturally significant reason.

In 1982, the California court case Wana the Bear v. Community Construction sided with developers in the destruction of a Miwok burial ground in Stockton, California. Over 600 burial remains were removed for a residential development and the Miwok had no power to stop development or to the remains of their ancestors, since Native American burial grounds were not legally considered cemeteries. The has been referred to as ethnocentrism in settler colonial law.

The paved site of the West Berkeley Shellmound continues to be threatened by housing developments and has become a significant site of contention in the San Francisco Bay Area. Numerous Tongva village sites and burial grounds continue to be desecrated from developments in the greater Los Angeles area, such as the unearthing of 400 burials at Guashna for a development in Playa Vista in 2004. The Acjachemen sacred village site of Putiidhem was desecrated and buried underneath JSerra Catholic High School in 2003 despite protests from the people.

A recurring issue that biological archaeologists face is, during the prehistoric/historic period and late period, Malibu was a common burial site for Indigenous Californians. This makes it nearly impossible to separate the remains of individuals who lived during the historic period and those who were buried before the Europeans arrived.

==== Land Back movement ====
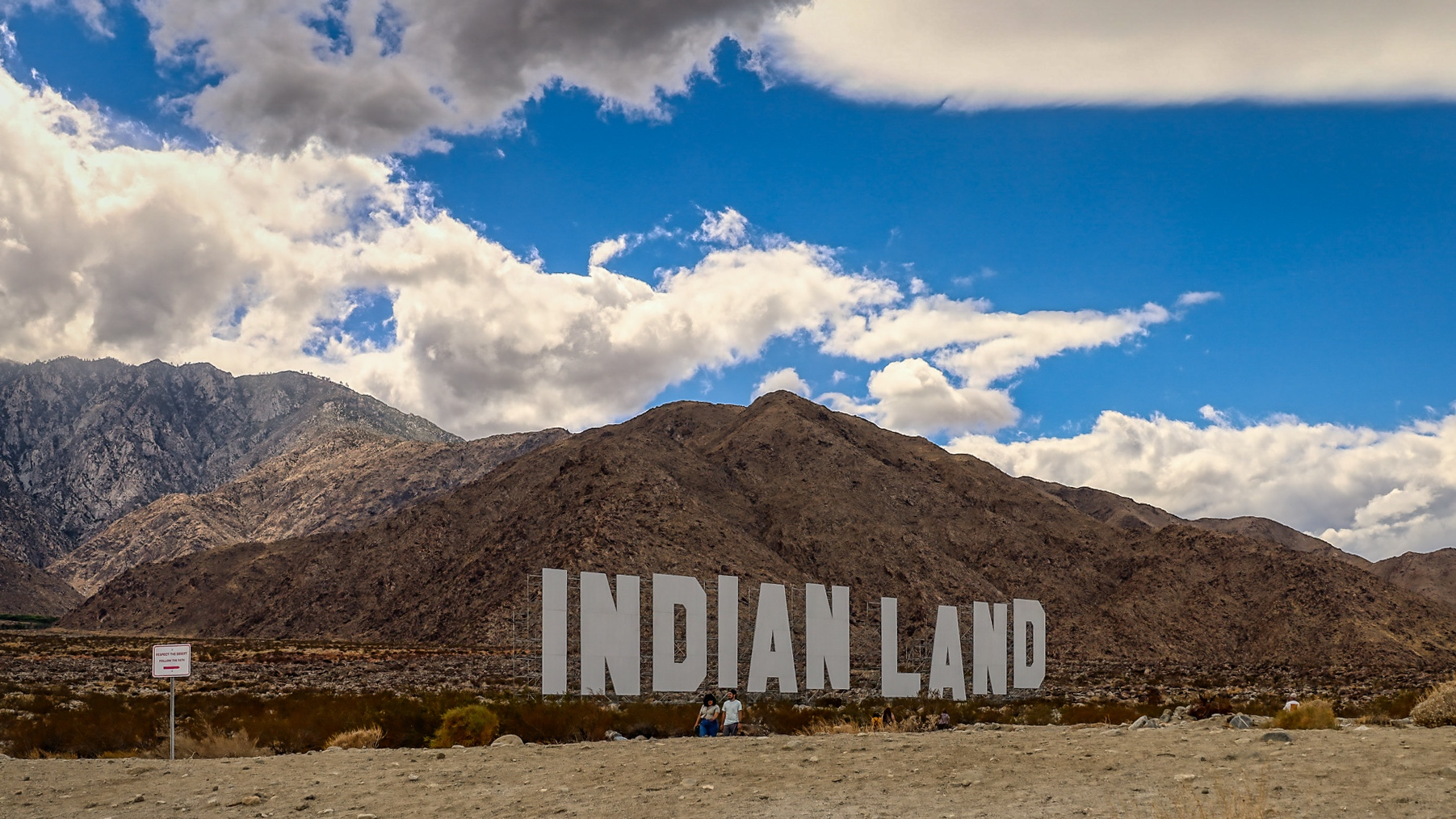
"Never Forget," an installation by Tlingit and Unangax̂ artist Nicholas Galanin in Palm Springs (2021)

The Land Back movement in California has gained visibility and action in various places throughout the state. Tuluwat Island was the site of the 1860 Wiyot massacre. The return began in 2000 with a purchase by the Wiyot tribe for 1.5 acres (0.61 ha) of the site, which was contaminated and abandoned as a shipyard. In 2015, the Eureka City Council voted to return the island. An article for CNN stated that this return is perhaps "the first time that a US municipality repatriated land to an Indigenous tribe without strings attached." The official transfer occurred in 2019.

Tribes excluded from federal recognition do not have a land base, which makes tribal identity more invisible. Land back movements have formed to return land to these tribes. This includes the Sogorea Te' Land Trust and the Tongva Taraxat Paxaavxa Conservancy, which established the Shuumi Land Tax and the kuuyam nahwá'a ("guest exchange") respectively as a way for people living on their traditional homelands to pay a form of contribution for living on the land. In 2021, the Alameda City Council voted to pay in Shuumi Tax $11,000 for two years, becoming the first city to pay the tax.

In 2024, 2,820 acres of ancestral homeland were returned to the Shasta Indian Nation by California governor Gavin Newsom. This included tribally significant lands that were drowned by the construction of the Copco I dam in 1922.

== Material culture ==
=== Basket weaving ===
Basket making was an important part of Native American Californian culture. Baskets were both beautiful and functional, made of twine, woven tight enough that they could hold water for cooking. Tribes made baskets in a wide variety of shapes and sizes to fulfill different daily functions, including "baby baskets, collecting vessels, food bowls, cooking items, ceremonial items" and wearable basket caps for both men and women. The watertight cooking baskets were often used for making acorn soup by placing fire-heated stones in the baskets with food mixtures, which were then stirred until cooked.

Baskets were generally made by women. Girls learned about the process from an early age, not just the act of weaving, but also how to tend, harvest, and prepare the plants for weaving.

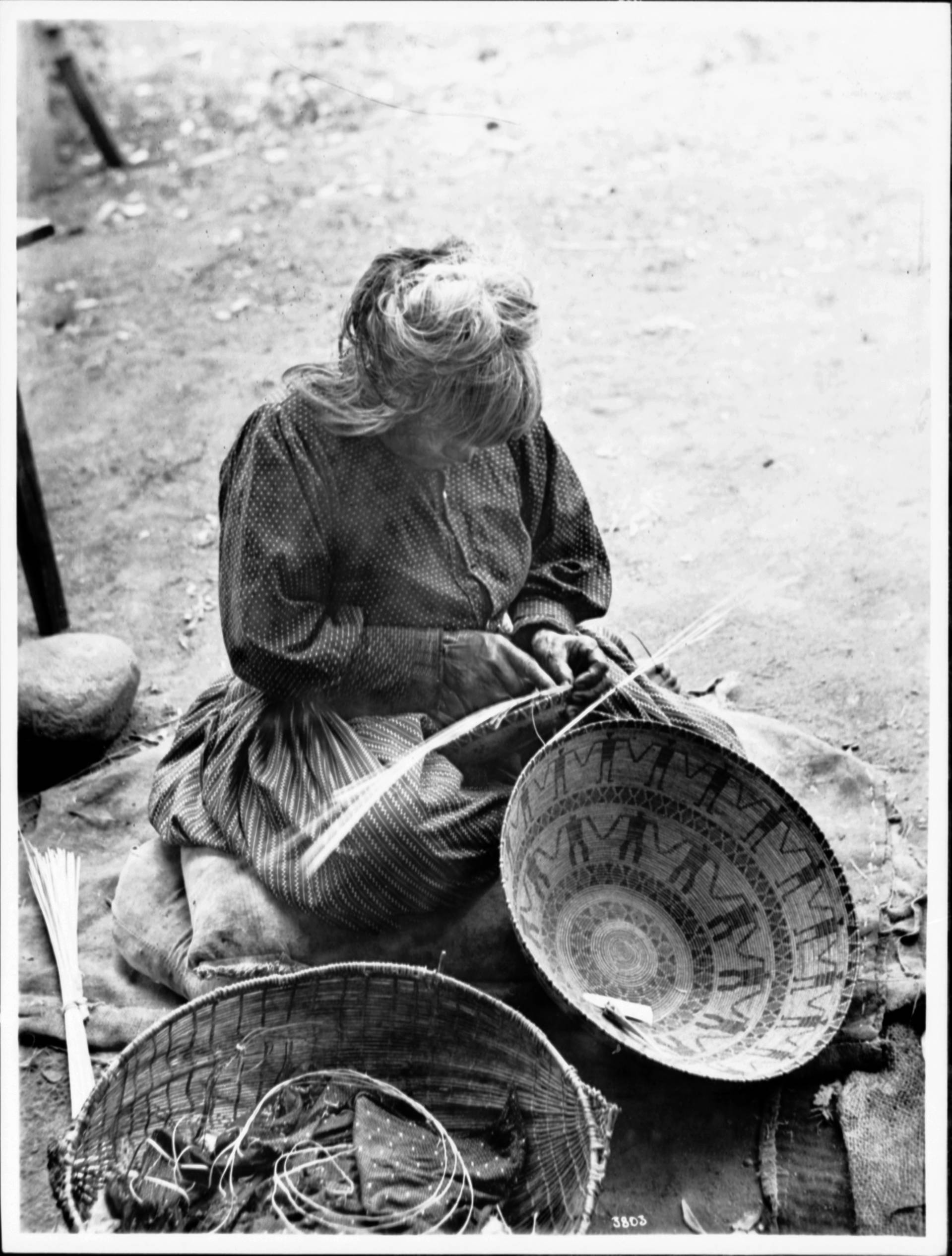
Yokuts woman basket maker, Tule River Reservation ca. 1900

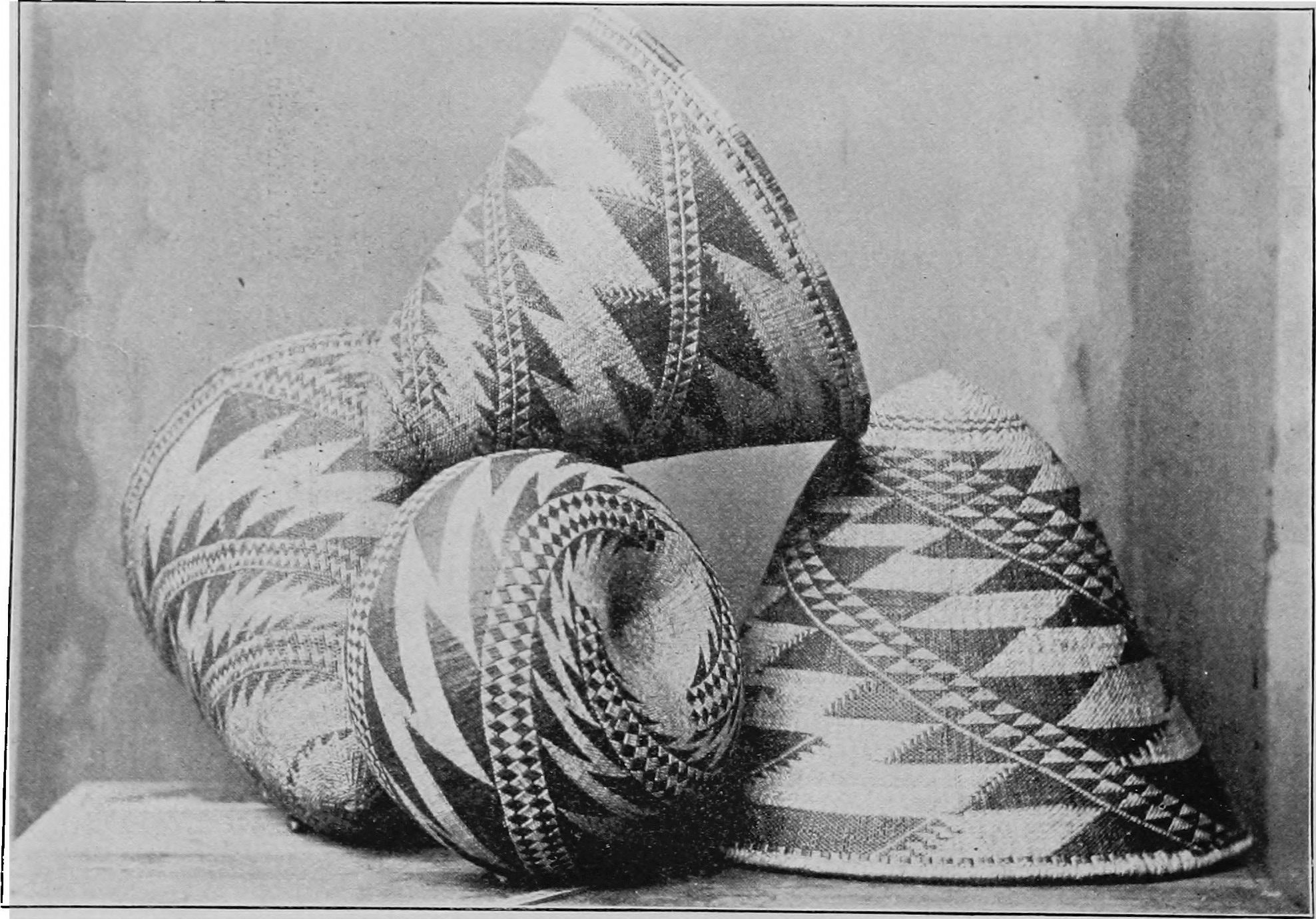
Pomo baskets, chuset weave

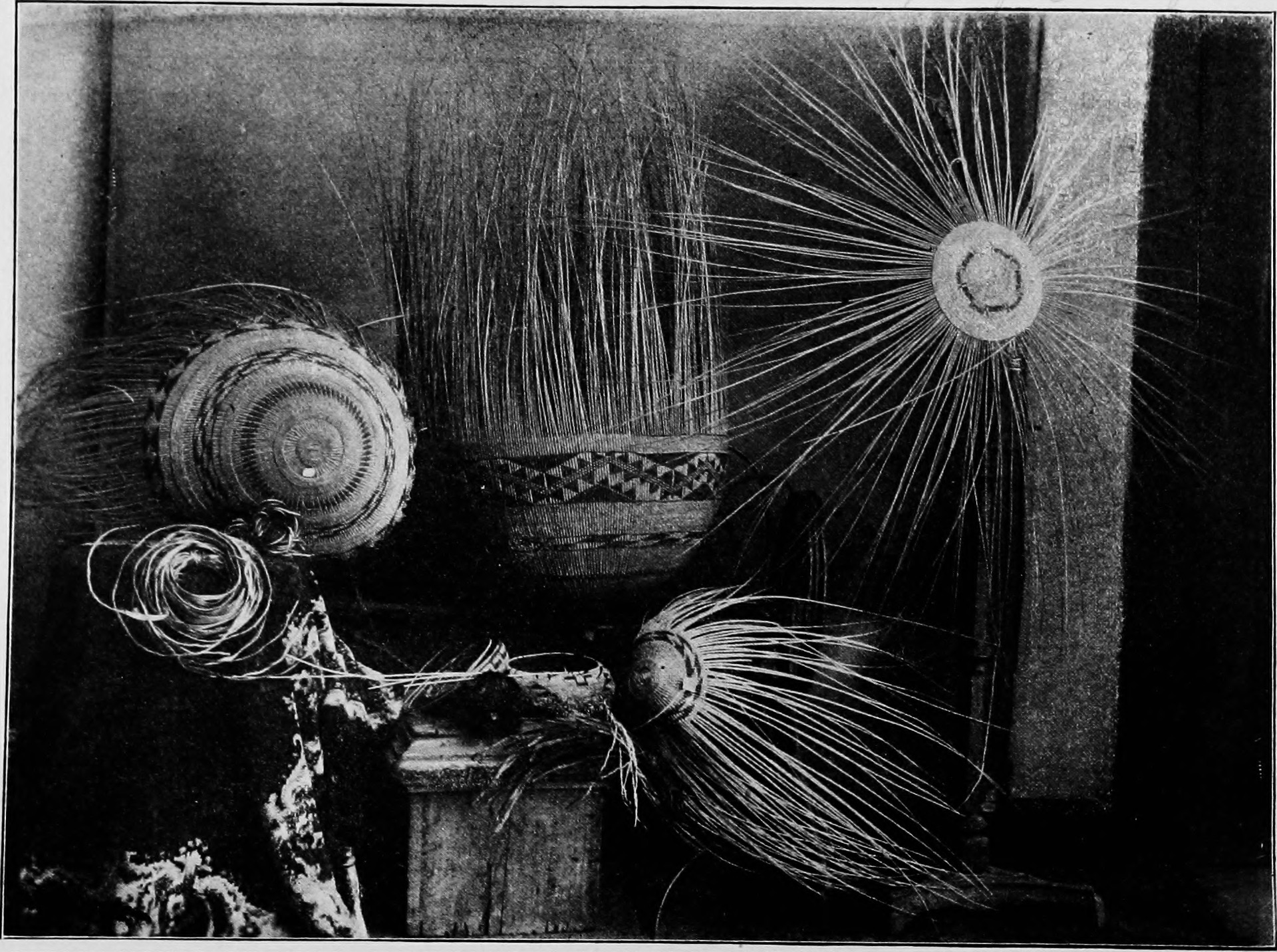
Basket materials and foundations

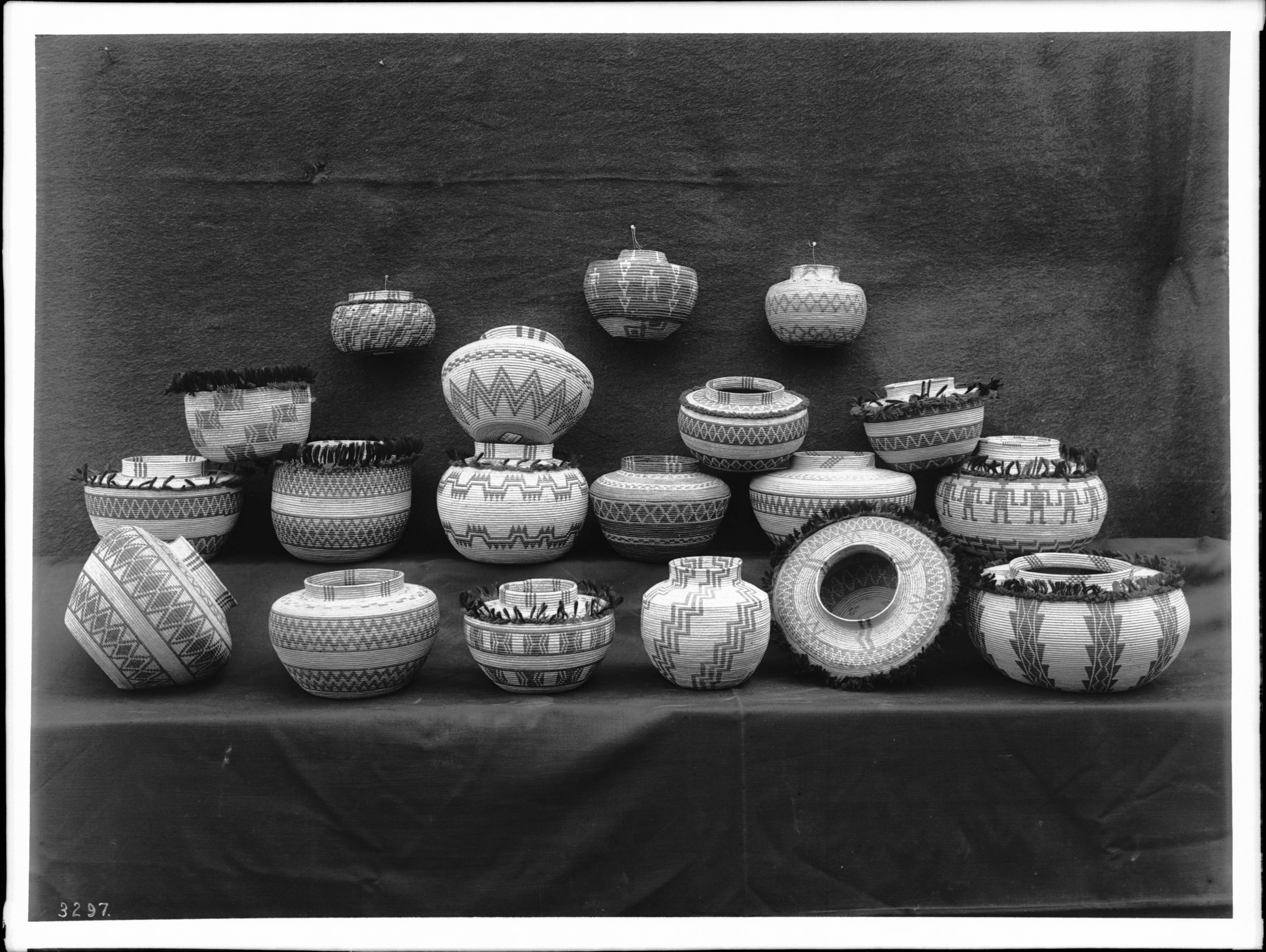
Indigenous baskets of California, photographed ca. 1900

=== Foods ===
The Indigenous peoples of California had a rich and diverse resource base, with access to hundreds of types of edible plants, both terrestrial and marine mammals, birds and insects. Coastal groups often depended more on fish and shellfish, while inland communities relied more on nuts, seeds, hunting, and river resources. Mountain and desert groups also used foods that were available in their local areas. Because of this, scholars note that there was no single diet shared by all Indigenous peoples of California. The diversity of the food supply was particularly important and sets California apart from other areas, where if the primary food supply diminished for any reason it could be devastating for the people in that region. In California, the variety meant that if one supply failed there were hundreds of others to fall back on. Despite this abundance, there were still 20–30 primary food resources which Native peoples were dependent on. Different tribes' diets included fish, shellfish, insects, deer, elk, antelope, and plants such as buckeye, sage seed, and yampah (Perideridia gairdneri).

==== Plant-based foods ====
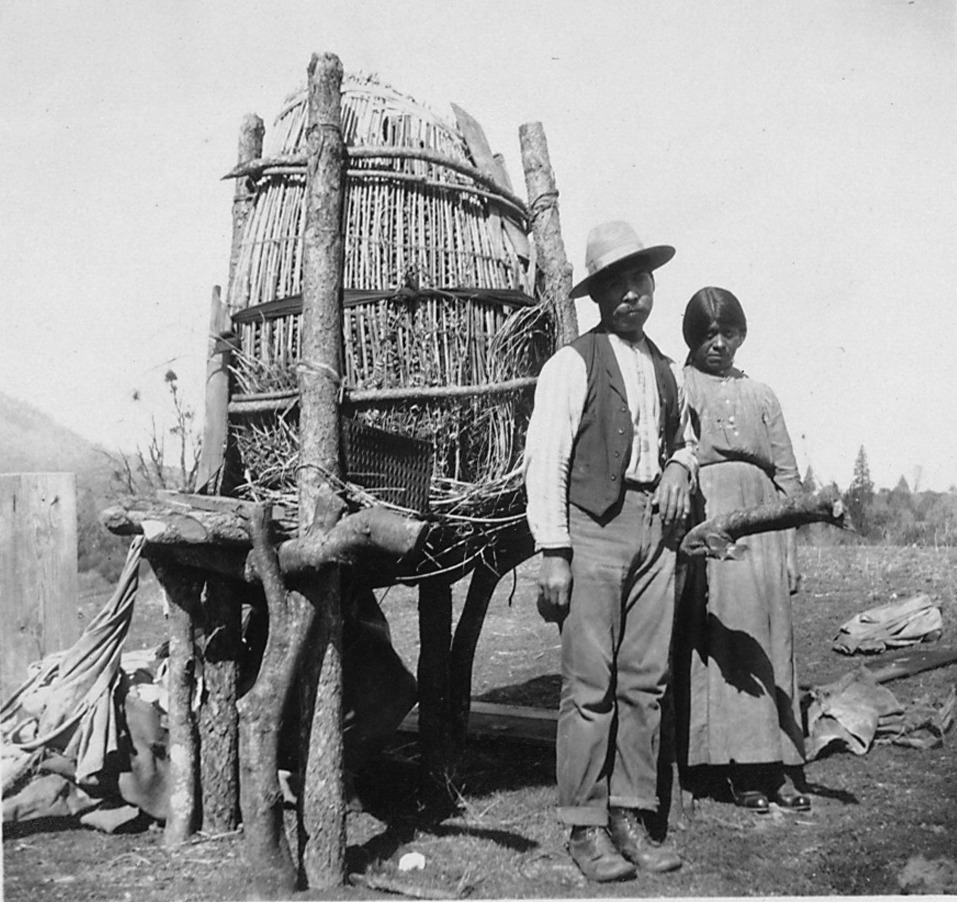
Acorn cache of the Mono people, California. c. 1920.

Acorns of the California Live Oak, Quercus agrifolia, were a primary traditional food throughout much of California. The acorns were ground into meal, and then either boiled into mush or baked in ashes to make bread. Acorns contain large amounts of tannic acid, so turning them into a food source required a discovery of how to remove this acid and significant amounts of labor to process them. Grinding in the mortal and pestle, then boiling allows for the tannins to be leached out in the water. There was also the need to harvest and store acorns like crops since they were only available in the fall. Acorns were stored in large granaries within villages, "providing a reliable food source through the winter and spring."

Native American tribes also used the berries of the Manzanita as a staple food source. The ripe berries were eaten raw, cooked or made into jellies. The pulp of the berries could also be dried and crushed to make a cider, while the dry seeds were sometimes ground to make flour. The bark was also used to make a tea, which would help the bladder and kidneys.

Native Americans also made extensive use of the California juniper for medicinal purposes and as a food. The Ohlone and the Kumeyaay brewed a tea made from juniper leaves to use as a painkiller and to help remedy a hangover. They also picked the berries for eating, either fresh or dried and pulverised. The ripe berries of the California huckleberry were also collected and eaten by many peoples in the region.

California hazelnuts were also an important food source for some Indigenous groups. Research from Quiroste Valley suggests that Indigenous communities interacted with hazelnut populations for long periods of time. Hazelnuts provided a nutritious seasonal food and were likely part of a broader food system that included seeds, nuts, and other plant resources.

Food also had social and ceremonial importance in many Indigenous communities beyond its nutritional value. Evidence from the Mission Santa Clara ranchería connects plant and animal remains with both daily meals and ritual activities. Shared meals could strengthen family and community relationships, showing that foodways often carried cultural meaning in addition to practical use.

==== Marine life ====
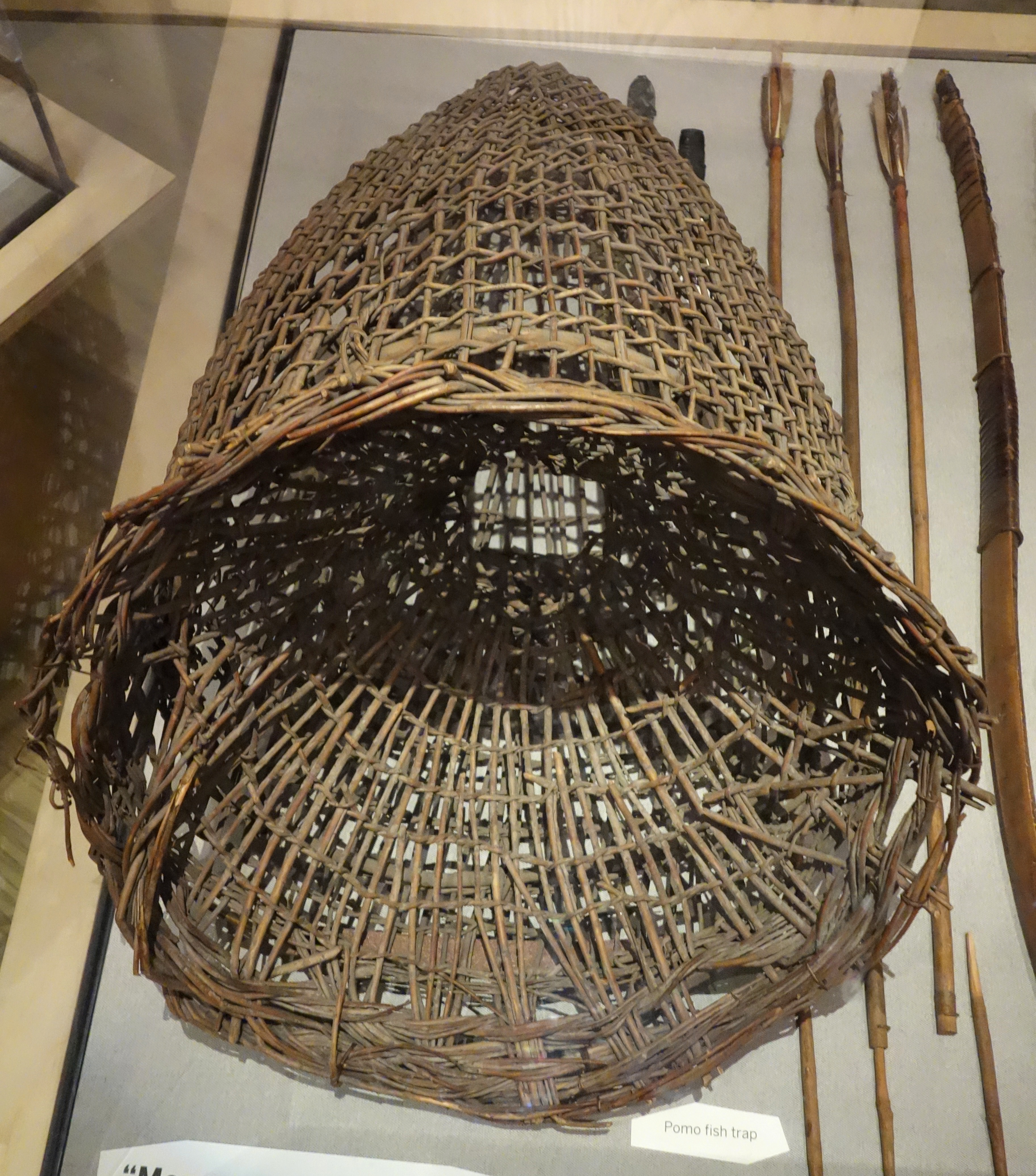
Pomo fish trap

There were two types of marine mammals important as food sources, large migratory species such as northern elephant seals and California sea lions and non-migratory, such as harbor seals and sea otters. Marine mammals were hunted for their meat and blubber, but even more importantly for their furs. Otter pelts in particular were important both for trade and as symbols of status.

A large quantity and variety of marine fish lived along the west coast of California, providing shoreline communities with food. Tribes living along the coast did mostly shore-based fishing.

==== Anadromous fish ====
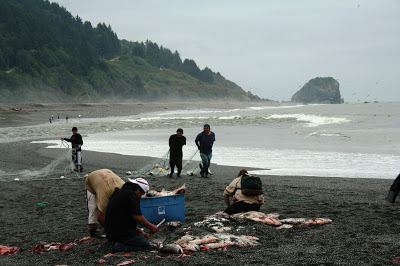
Yurok harvesting Chinook Salmon at the Klamath River's mouth in 2013

Anadromous fish live half their life in the sea and the other half in the river where they come to spawn. Large rivers such as the Klamath and Sacramento "provided abundant fish along hundreds of miles during the spawning season." Pacific salmon in particular were very important in the Californian Native American diet. Pacific salmon ran in Californian coastal rivers and streams from the Oregon line down to Baja California. For northwestern groups like Yurok and Karuk, Salmon was the defining food. For example, more than half of the diet of the Karuk people consisted of acorns and salmon from the Klamath River. This combination of fish with acorns distinguished them from some societies in the north which focused solely on fishing.

In contrast to acorns, fish required sophisticated equipment such as dip nets and harpoons and they could only be caught during a brief seasonal window. During this time, salmon would be harvested, dried and stored in large quantities for later consumption.

==== Land Management ====
Many Indigenous communities in California managed the land in ways that helped increase food resources. Vegetation on native lands were not always consistently the same across the California region according to lake sediment records. Changes along the central California coast during the late Holocene era using lake sediment records show that Indigenous cultural burning practices played a key role in shaping local ecosystems over time. These burns primarily consumed fine organic materials such as grasses, leaf litter, and small woody debris, which allowed for controlled, low-intensity fires. Studies from the central California coast also find that controlled burning was used to keep grasslands open, support useful plants, and make hunting easier. These practices required detailed environmental knowledge passed down over generations. Land management was an important part of how communities supported themselves. Archaeological and paleoenvironmental evidence also show that Indigenous cultural burnings that took place in the Quiroste Valley maintained open coastal prairie habitats rich in edible and useful plant species. These controlled, low-intensity fires encouraged the growth of seed-producing grasses, which are well represented in the site's archaeobotanical record. Faunal remains further indicate that such managed landscapes supported a diversity of animals attracted to these productive environments, providing reliable food sources. Together, these lines of evidence demonstrate that cultural burning was a deliberate strategy that enhanced biodiversity and supplied Native Californians with a wide range of sustainable resources. Without Indigenous cultural burning, landscape(s) would likely have become dense shrubland and forest with limited plant food resources; routine ritual burnings helped maintain biodiversity and prevent the buildup of heavier organic fauna that could lead to more destructive wildfires. Frequent and low-intensity burns helped maintain open grassland and coastal prairie ecosystems that supported abundant seed-bearing plants and other useful species. Archaeobotanical evidence demonstrates higher proportions of fire-adapted plants, indicating that these burning practices actively enhanced biodiversity and resource availability. Overall, cultural burning functioned as a deliberate land management strategy that sustained productive ecosystems and allowed natural resources to thrive over long periods.

Colonization dramatically altered native ecosystems by disrupting Indigenous land management practices and introducing new species and agricultural systems. Ecological transformations stemming from colonial rule reshaped the availability of natural resources, often changing how Indigenous communities accessed and used plant and animal species. Spanish missionization and colonial policies suppressed practices such as controlled burning, which had previously maintained diverse and productive ecosystems, leading to long-term environmental change. As a result, while some Indigenous groups adapted and maintained elements of traditional foodways, the overall impact of colonization was a significant shift in coastal ecosystems and resource distribution.

Before colonization, Indigenous practices created and sustained habitats favoring species like California voles, which thrive in open environments rather than dense vegetation. With the suppression of these practices during colonization, landscapes shifted toward denser shrubland and forested conditions, reducing suitable habitats for many native fauna. These ecological changes altered local microclimates and habitat structures, leading to declines or redistribution of species that depended on maintained grassland ecosystems. Over time, fauna and climate-related habitat patterns were reshaped by interrupting Indigenous environmental stewardship that had actively structured and stabilized their ecosystems.

== Society and culture ==
Tribes lived in societies where men and women had different roles. Women were generally responsible for weaving, harvesting, processing, and preparing food, while men were generally responsible for hunting and other forms of labor. It was also noted by Juan Crespi and Pedro Fages of "men who dressed as women" being an integral part of Native society. The Spanish generally detested these people, who they referred to as joyas in mission records. With colonialism "joyas were driven from their communities by tribal members at the instigation of priests and made homeless." The joyas traditionally were responsible for death, burial, and mourning rituals and performed women's roles.

Many tribes in Central California and Northern California practised the Kuksu religion, especially the Nisenan, Maidu, Pomo and Patwin tribes. The practice of Kuksu included elaborate narrative ceremonial dances and specific regalia. A male secret society met in underground dance rooms and danced in disguises at the public dances.

In Southern California the Toloache religion was dominant among tribes such as the Luiseño and Diegueño. Ceremonies were performed after consuming a hallucinogenic drink made of the jimsonweed or Toloache plant (Datura meteloides), which put devotees in a trance and gave them access to supernatural knowledge.

Native American culture in California was also noted for its rock art, especially among the Chumash of southern California. The rock art, or pictographs were brightly colored paintings of humans, animals and abstract designs, and were thought to have had religious significance.

== Reservations ==
Map of Indian reservations in Northern California.

Map of Indian reservations in Southern California.

Reservations with over 500 people:

Most Populated Reservations in California
Legal/Statistical Area Description	Tribe(s)	Population (2010)	Area in mi^{2} (km^{2})			Includes ORTL?	Seat of Government/Capital
Legal/Statistical Area Description	Tribe(s)	Population (2010)	Land	Water	Total	Includes ORTL?	Tribal Council Address Location
Agua Caliente Indian Reservation	Cahuilla (Ivilyuqaletem)	24,781	53.32 (138.090)	0.36 (0.94)	53.68 (139.04)	yes	Se-Khi (Palm Springs)
Colorado River Indian Reservation	Chemehuevi Mohave Hopi Navajo	8,764	457.31 (1,184.44)	6.83 (17.68)	464.14 (1,202.13)	no	'Amat Kuhwely (Parker, Arizona)
Torres-Martinez Reservation	Cahuilla (Ivilyuqaletem)	5,594	34.22 (88.62)	15.04 (38.96)	49.26 (127.58)	no	Kokell (Thermal)
Hoopa Valley Reservation	Hupa	3,041	140.77 (364.59)	0.92 (2.38)	141.68 (366.96)	no	Hoopa
Washoe Ranches Trust Land	Washoe	2,916	144.99 (375.53)	1.05 (2.71)	146.04 (378.24)	no	Gardnerville, Nevada
Fort Yuma Indian Reservation	Quechan	2,197	68.93 (178.53)	1.39 (3.61)	70.32 (182.14)	no	Yuma, Arizona
Bishop Reservation	Mono Timbisha	1,588	1.35 (3.50)	0.014 (0.035)	1.37 (3.54)	no	Bishop
Fort Mojave Reservation	Mohave	1,477	51.58 (133.58)	1.15 (2.99)	52.73 (136.57)	yes	ʼAha Kuloh (Needles, California)
Pala Reservation	Luiseño (Payómkawichum) Cupeño (Kuupangaxwichem)	1,315	20.35 (52.71)	0	20.35 (52.71)	no	Pala, California
Yurok Reservation	Yurok	1,238	84.73 (219.46)	3.35 (8.67)	88.08 (228.13)	no	Klamath
Rincon Reservation	Luiseño (Payómkawichum)	1,215	6.16 (15.96)	0	6.16 (15.96)	yes	Sówmy/Kuutpamay (Valley Center)
Tejon Indian Tribe of California	Kitanemuk Yokuts Chumash	1,111					South of Woilo (Bakersfield)
San Pasqual Reservation	Kumeyaay	1,097	2.24 (5.79)	0	2.24 (5.79)	no	Valley Center
Tule River Reservation	Yokuts Mono	1,049	84.29 (218.32)	0	84.29 (218.32)	yes	Uchiyingetau_{(Indigenous name of area)} (address in Porterville)
Morongo Reservation	Cahuilla (Ivilyuqaletem) Serrano (Taaqtam)	913	53.48 (138.50)	0.13 (0.33)	53.60 (138.83)	yes	Banning
Cabazon Reservation	Cahuilla (Ivilyuqaletem)	835	3.00 (7.77)	0	3.00 (7.77)	no	Indio
Santa Rosa Rancheria	Yokuts	652	0.63 (1.62)	0	0.63 (1.62)	no	Walu_{(Indigenous name of area)} (Lemoore)
Barona Reservation	Kumeyaay	640	9.31 (24.12)	0	9.31 (24.12)	no	Lakeside
Susanville Indian Rancheria	Washoe Achomawi Northern Paiute Atsugewi	549	1.67 (4.33)	0	1.67 (4.33)	yes	Susanville
Viejas Reservation	Kumeyaay	520	2.51 (6.50)	0	2.51 (6.50)	no	Alpine
Karuk Reservation	Karuk	506	1.49 (3.85)	0.035 (0.091)	1.52 (3.94)	yes	Athithúf-vuunupma (Happy Camp)

== List of peoples ==
- Achomawi, Achumawi, Pit River tribe, northeastern California
- Atsugewi, northeastern California
- Cahuilla, southern California
- Chemehuevi, eastern California
- Chumash, coastal southern California
  - "Barbareño", Coast Central Chumash
  - "Cruzeño, Isleño", Island Chumash
  - "Emigdiano", Tecuya, Interior Central Chumash
  - "Interior", Cuyama, Interior Northwestern Chumash
  - "Inezeño", "Ineseño", Samala, Inland Central Chumash
  - "Obispeño", Yak-tityu-tityu-yak-tilhini, Northern Chumash
  - "Purisimeño", Kagismuwas, Northern Chumash
  - "Ventureño", Alliklik – Castac, Southern Chumash
- Chilula, northwestern California
- Chimariko, extinct, northwestern California
- Kuneste, "Eel River Athapaskan peoples"
  - Lassik, northwestern California
  - Mattole (Bear River), northwestern California
  - Nongatl, northwestern California
  - Sinkyone, northwestern California
  - Wailaki, Wai-lakki, northwestern California
- Esselen, west-central California
- Hupa, northwestern California
  - Tsnungwe
- Karok, northwestern California
- Kato, Cahto, northwestern California
- Kawaiisu, southeast-central California
- Konkow, northern-central California
- Kumeyaay, Diegueño, Kumiai
  - Ipai, southwestern California
    - Jamul, southwestern California
  - Tipai, southwestern California and northwestern Mexico
- La Jolla complex, southern California, c. 6050–1000 BCE
- Maidu, northeastern California
  - Konkow, northern California
  - Yamani, Mechoopda, northern California
  - Nisenan, Southern Maidu, northern California
- Miwok, Me-wuk, central California
  - Bay Miwok, west-central California
  - Coast Miwok, west-central California
  - Lake Miwok, west-central California
  - Valley and Sierra Miwok
- Monache, Western Mono, central California
- Mohave, southeastern California
- Nisenan, eastern-central California
- Nomlaki, northwestern California
- Ohlone, Costanoan, west-central California
  - Awaswas
  - Chalon
  - Chochenyo
  - Karkin
  - Mutsun
  - Ramaytush
  - Rumsen
  - Tamyen
  - Yelamu
- Patwin, central California
  - Suisun, Southern Patwin, central California
- Pauma Complex, southern California, c. 6050–1000 BCE
- Pomo, northwestern and central-western California
- Quechan, Yuman, southeastern California
- Te'po'ta'ahl, ("Salinan"), coastal central California
  - "Antoniaño"
  - "Migueleño"
  - "Playano"
- Shasta northwestern California
  - Konomihu, northwestern California
  - Okwanuchu, northwestern California
- Tolowa, northwestern California
- Takic
  - Acjachemem, ("Juaneño"), Takic, southwestern California
  - Iívil̃uqaletem, Iviatim, ("Cahuilla"), Takic southern California
  - Kitanemuk, ("Tejon") Takic, south-central California
  - Kuupangaxwichem, ("Cupeño"), southern California
  - Payómkawichum, ("Luiseño"), Takic, southwestern California
  - Tataviam, Allilik Takic ("Fernandeño"), southern California
  - Tongva, ("Gabrieleño"), ("Fernandeño"), ("Nicoleño"), "San Clemente tribe" Takic, coastal southern California
  - Yuhaviatam Morongo, Vanyume Mohineyam ("Serrano"), southern California
- Tubatulabal, south-central California
  - Bankalachi, Toloim, south-central California
  - Pahkanapil, south-central California
  - Palagewan, south-central California
- Wappo, north-central California
- Whilkut, northwestern California
- Wintu, northwestern California
- Wiyot, northwestern California
- Yana, northern-central California
  - Yahi
- Yokuts, central and southern California
  - Chukchansi, Foothill Yokuts, central California
  - Northern Valley Yokuts, central California
  - Tachi tribe, Southern Valley Yokuts, south-central California
- Timbisha, eastern California
- Yuki, Ukomno'm, northwestern California
  - Huchnom, northwestern California
- Yurok, northwestern California

== Languages ==
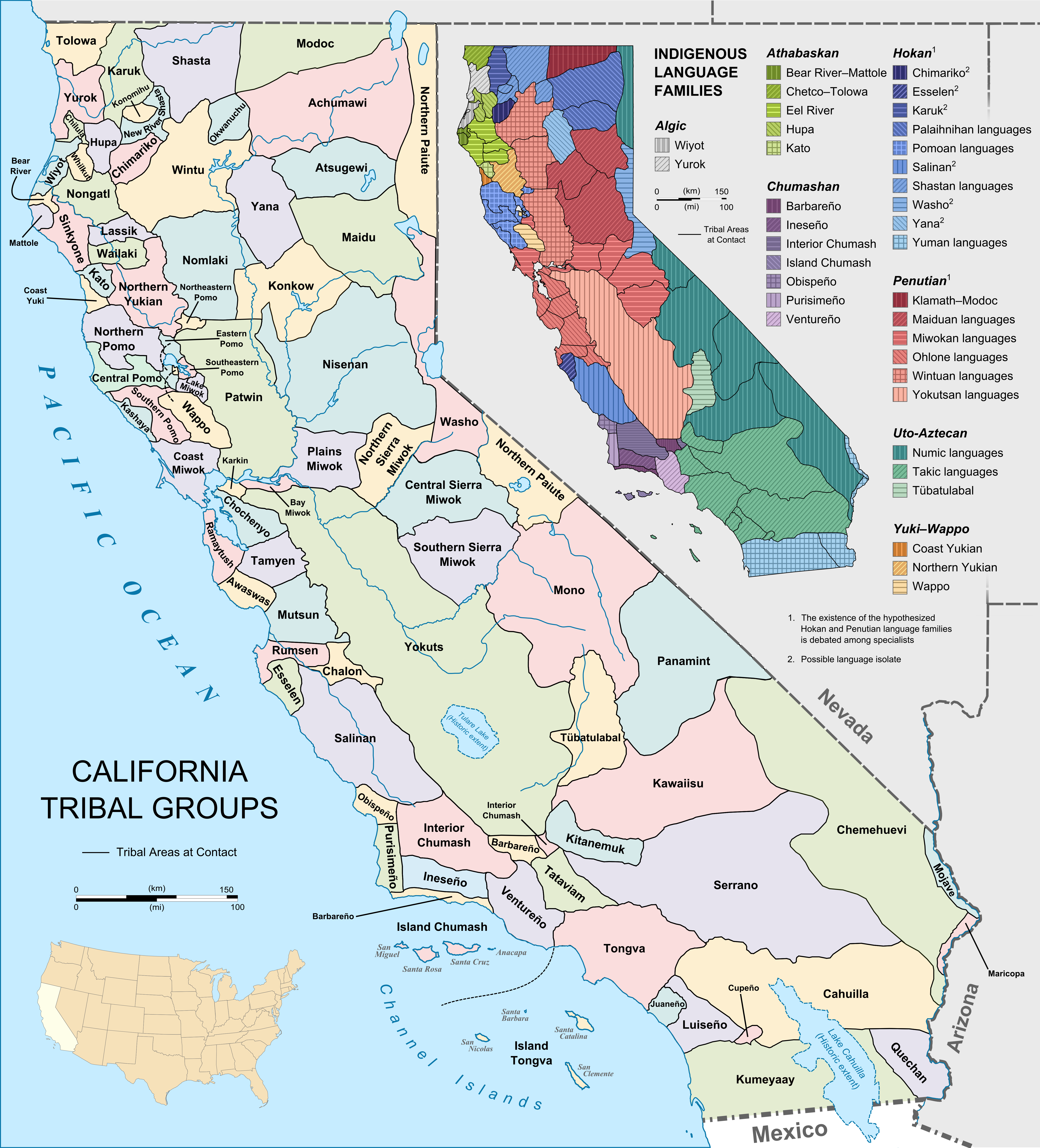
A map of California tribal groups and languages at the time of European contact.

Before European contact, Native Californians spoke over 300 dialects of approximately 100 distinct languages. The large number of languages has been related to the ecological diversity of California, and to a sociopolitical organization into small tribelets (usually 100 individuals or fewer) with a shared "ideology that defined language boundaries as unalterable natural features inherent in the land". Together, the area had more linguistic diversity than all of Europe combined.

According to Victor Golla, "The majority of California Indian languages belong either to highly localized language families with two or three members (e.g. Yukian, Maiduan) or are language isolates (e.g. Karuk, Esselen)." Of the remainder, most are Uto-Aztecan or Athapaskan languages. Larger groupings have been proposed. The Hokan superstock has the greatest time depth and has been most difficult to demonstrate; Penutian is somewhat less controversial.

There is evidence suggestive that speakers of the Chumashan languages and Yukian languages, and possibly languages of southern Baja California such as Waikuri, were in California prior to the arrival of Penutian languages from the north and Uto-Aztecan from the east, perhaps predating even the Hokan languages. Wiyot and Yurok are distantly related to Algonquian languages in a larger grouping called Algic. The several Athapaskan languages are relatively recent arrivals, having arrived about 2000 years ago.

Existing Indigenous Languages of California
Language	Language Family	Tribe(s)	Number of Speakers
Karuk	Hokan	Karok	700
Kumeyaay	Yuman	Kumeyaay	427
Yurok	Algic	Yurok	414
Mono	Uto-Aztecan	Mono Owens Valley Paiute	349
Mojave	Yuman	Mohave	330
Luiseño	Uto-Aztecan	Payómkawichum/Luiseño Acjachemen/Juaneño	327
Quechan	Yuman	Quechan	290
Cahuilla	Uto-Aztecan	Cahuilla	139
Tiipai-Kumeyaay	Yuman	Kumeyaay	100
Achumawi	Shasta	Achomawi	68
Tachi	Yok-Utian	Santa Rosa Rancheria (Yokut)	45
Chumash (any Chumash)	Chumashan	Chumash	39
Nomlaki	Wintuan	Nomlaki	38
Konkow	Maiduan	Mechoopda (Maidu)	32
Yawelmani	Yok-Utian	Tule River Reservation (Southern Valley Yokuts)	25
Kashaya	Hokan	Kashia	24
Wintu	Wintuan	Wintu	24
Timbisha	Uto-Aztecan	Timbisha	20
Washo	Hokan	Washoe	20
Atsugewi	Shasta	Atsugewi	15
Central Sierra Miwok	Utian	Chicken Ranch Rancheria of Me-Wuk Indians of California (Miwok)	12
Cupeño	Uto-Aztecan	Cupeño	11
Chukchansi	Yok-Utian	Picayune Rancheria of Chukchansi Indians (Yokut)	8
Southern Sierra Miwok	Utian	Plains and Sierra Miwok	7
Southeastern Pomo	Hokan	Pomo	7
Serrano	Uto-Aztecan	Serrano	6
Ipai-Kumeyaay	Yuman	Kumeyaay	6
Kawaiisu	Uto-Aztecan	Kawaiisu	5
Tübatulabal	Uto-Aztecan	Tübatulabal	5
Tolowa	Athabaskan	Tolowa Chetco	4
Hupa	Athabaskan	Hupa Tsnungwe	4
Chemehuevi	Uto-Aztecan	Chemehuevi	3
Shasta	Shastan	Shasta	2
Patwin	Wintuan	Patwin	1
Wikchamni	Yok-Utian	Wukchumni (Yokut)	1
Chochenyo (Ohlone)	Utian	Chochenyo; within the Muwekma Ohlone Tribe	1

== See also ==
- Aboriginal title in California
- California State Indian Museum
- Indigenous peoples of Mexico
- List of federally recognized tribes by state#California
- Martis people
- Mission Indians
- Population of Native California
- Survey of California and Other Indian Languages
- Traditional narratives of Indigenous Californians
- Bibliography of California history
- Rematriation
