= Clarence Atwell Jr. =

American Tachi Yokuts tribal leader and politician

Clarence Atwell Jr. (November 30, 1945 – February 28, 2013) was an American Tachi Yokuts tribal leader and politician. He served as the Chairman of the Tachi Yokuts of Santa Rosa Rancheria from 1967 until 2009. Atwell has been widely credited with improving the standard of living on the Santa Rosa Rancheria reservation during his 42-year tenure as Chairman of the Tachi Yokuts.

Atwell was born on Tachi Yokuts land, under a tree, on November 30, 1945. His father was a medicine man. He was raised by his grandmother, who only spoke the Tachi language. She taught Atwell indigenous Tachi Yokuts traditions and hunting techniques. Clarence Atwell would later become a medicine man like his father. As an adult, Clarence Atwell Jr. held bear dances and sweat lodge throughout California. His first wife, Audrey, died in 2000. He had two children from his first marriage: Kaya Atwell and Rufus Atwell. He married his second wife, Jeanette, in 2002.

Clarence Atwell died from cancer at Adventist Medical Center in Hanford, California, on February 28, 2013, at the age of 67.
