= Santa Rosa Rancheria =

Native American nation in California

Coordinates: 36°14′10″N 119°45′18″W

Location of Santa Rosa Rancheria

Santa Rosa Rancheria is the reservation of the Santa Rosa Indian Community of the Santa Rosa Rancheria. It is located 4.5 miles (7.24 km) southeast of Lemoore, California. Established in 1934 on about 40 acres (16 hectares), the Santa Rosa Rancheria belongs to the federally recognized Tachi Yokuts tribe. It is the site of the Tachi Palace Hotel & Casino. The population was 517 at the time of the 2000 United States census and had increased to 652 by the 2010 United States census. In 2010, 288 residents (44.2% of the total) were under 18 and 29 (4.4%) were 65 and over.

Ruben Barrios was elected as the Tribal Chairman in 2009. The previous Tribal Chairman, Clarence Atwell Jr., served in that position for 42 years and died in 2013.

The Santa Rosa Rancheria expanded in size over the years to 643 acres (260 hectares) by the beginning of 2008. On May 28, 2008, then–Tribal Chairman Clarence Atwell Jr. and Dale Morris, Pacific Region Director of the U.S. Bureau of Indian Affairs, signed documents that added 1,163 acres (471 hectares) of trust land, thus enlarging the Rancheria to 1,806 acres (731 hectares).

== Citizenship ==
The Citizenship Act of 1924 gave all American Indians citizenship rights while allowing them to retain their tribal citizenship but it made little difference in the way they were treated by the government. As part of their integration into the larger American society, the federal government sent their children to government schools, the religion was banned, and the teaching of the native language and culture was all but forbidden. Even after the land grabs and removal efforts had ceased, the damage had been done. The division of the native people, the suppression of the Indian culture, and the influence of the greater American society left them with few ties to the past. Aspirations for the future were being destroyed by the resulting economic hardships and prejudice. For generations, the native people have tried to support themselves as seasonal field laborers. Government regulations produced long-term economic stagnation on the reservation, resulting in 85% unemployment, a crumbling infrastructure, and a cycle of poverty which ground away at the hope for a better future for their children.

== Government ==
The Tachi-Yokuts Tribe Tribal administrator is Janice Cuara. The Santa Rosa Rancheria Tribal council consists of six members. Ruben Barrios the chairman, Elmer Thomas the vice-chairman, Rafaella Dieter the Secretary, Dena Baga the Treasurer, Elaine Jeff and Patricia Davis as Delegates. As of June 1, 2018 Elmer Thomas and Rafaella Dieter has been recalled and removed from their position.

== Language ==
The traditional language of the tribe is the Tachi Yokuts dialect of Valley Yokuts.

== See also ==
- List of Indian reservations in the United States
