= Southern Valley Yokuts =

Valley Yokuts dialect of California, USA

- Native to: United States
- Region: California
- Language family: Yok-Utian: Yokutsan; General Yokuts; Nim; Northern Yokuts; Valley Yokuts; Southern Valley Yokuts
- Dialects: Wechihi; Tachi; Telamni; Chunut; Wowol; Yawelmani; Nutunutu; Wo'lasi; Choynok; Koyeti

Language codes
- ISO 639-3: –
- Glottolog: sout2955

Southern Valley Yokuts is a dialect network within the Valley Yokuts division of the Yokutsan languages spoken in the Central Valley of California.

Among the dialects grouped under the label Southern Valley Yokuts are Tachi, Telamni, Chunut, Wechihi, Wowol, Nutunutu, Wo'lasi, Choynok, Koyeti, and Yawelmani.

As of 2024, Tachi and Yawelmani are the only surviving varieties.
