= Northern Valley Yokuts =

Valley Yokuts dialect

- Native to: United States
- Region: Central Valley, California
- Language family: Yok-Utian ?: Yokutsan; General Yokuts; Nim; Northern Yokuts; Valley Yokuts; Northern Valley Yokuts
- Dialects: Chawchila; Nopṭinṭe; Kechayi; Dumna; Dalinchi; Toltichi; Chukchansi

Language codes
- ISO 639-3: –
- Glottolog: nort2937

Northern Valley Yokuts is a dialect network within the Valley Yokuts division of the Yokutsan languages spoken in the Central Valley of California. Among the languages belonging to the network are Chawchila, Nopṭinṭe, Kechayi, Dumna, Dalinchi, Toltichi, and Chukchansi. Of these, Kechayi, Dumna, Dalinchi, Toltichi, and Chukchansi are frequently grouped under the label Northern Hill dialects.

As of 2024, Chukchansi is the only surviving variety.
