= Yawelmani Yokuts =

Southern Valley Yokuts dialect of America

Yawelmani
- Yowlumne
- Yawʼlamnin ṭeexil
- Yawelmani sentence documented by A. L. Kroeber
- Pronunciation: [jawˀlamnin ʈɛːxil]
- Native to: California
- Region: Kern River
- Native speakers: 20–25 (2007, fluent and semispeakers)
- Language family: Yok-Utian ?: Yokutsan; General Yokuts; Nim; Northern Yokuts; Valley Yokuts; Southern; Koyeti–Yawelmani; Yawelmani

Language codes
- ISO 639-3: –
- Glottolog: None
- Historical distribution of Yawelmani

Closeup map of historical Yawelmani distribution

Yawelmani Yokuts (also spelled Yowlumne and Yauelmani) is an endangered dialect of Southern Valley Yokuts historically spoken by the Yokuts living along the Kern River north of Kern Lake in the Central Valley of California. Today, most Yawelmani speakers live on or near the Tule River Reservation.

== Name ==
Academic sources frequently use the name Yawelmani while referring to the language, though tribe members more often use the name Yowlumne. The difference in terminology comes from the language itself, where the form Yowlumne is singular and Yawelmani is the paucal form, that is, it refers to a small group. An increasing number of academic sources, including Weigel (2005), have opted to use Yowlumne instead, as the use of Yawelmani can be regarded as a misnomer.^{[a]}

When referencing their language, modern speakers of Yawelmani use the terms inyana (Indian), and yaw'lamnin ṭeexil (speech of the Yowlumne).

== Speakers ==
A 2011 estimate by Victor Golla placed the number of fluent and semi-fluent Yawelmani speakers at "up to twenty-five."

== Revitalization efforts ==
In 1993, the Master-Apprentice Language Learning Program piloted a series of language programs that included Yawelmani. The program was reportedly effective in teaching conversational Yawelmani to tribal members without prior knowledge and increasing language use among elders.

== Phonology ==
=== Consonants ===
Consonant phonemes
		Bilabial	Dental	Retroflex	Palatal	Velar	Glottal
Stop	plain	p /p/	t /t/	ṭ /ʈ/		k /k/	ʼ /ʔ/
Stop	aspirated	ph /pʰ/	th /tʰ/	ṭh /ʈʰ/		kh /kʰ/	
Stop	ejective	pʼ/pʼ/	tʼ/tʼ/	ṭʼ /ʈʼ/		kʼ /kʼ/	
Affricate	plain		c /t͡s/	c̣ /t͡ʂ/			
Affricate	aspirated		ch /t͡sʰ/	c̣h /t͡ʂʰ/			
Affricate	ejective		cʼ /t͡sʼ/	c̣ʼ /t͡ʂʼ/			
Fricative			s /s/	ṣ /ʂ/		x /x/	h /h/
Nasal	plain	m /m/	n /n/				
Nasal	glottalized	mʼ /mˀ/	nʼ /nˀ/				
Approximant	plain	w /w/	l /l/		y /j/		
Approximant	glottalized	wʼ /wˀ/	lʼ /lˀ/		yʼ /jˀ/		

=== Vowels ===
Yawelmani has 10 vowel phonemes:

	Unrounded		Rounded	
	short	long	short	long
High	i	iː	u	uː
Mid	ɛ	ɛː	ɔ	ɔː
Low	a	aː		

- There are 5 short-long vowel pairs.
- Short high vowels may become more centralized in fast speech: /i/ → [ɪ], /u/ → [ʊ].
- Long high vowels are almost always lower than their short counterparts: /iː/ → [ɛː], /uː/ → [ɔː].
- All long vowels may be shortened by a phonological process. Thus, a single long vowel has two different phonetic realizations:
  - /iː/ → [ɛ, ɛː],
  - /ɛː/ → [ɛ, ɛː],
  - /aː/ → [a, aː],
  - /uː/ → [ɔ, ɔː],
  - /ɔː/ → [ɔ, ɔː].
- Note that the high long vowel /uː/ is usually pronounced the same as /ɔ/ and /ɔː/.
- Note that the high long vowel /iː/ is usually pronounced the same as /ɛ/ and /ɛː/.

As can be seen, Yawelmani vowels have a number of different realizations (phones) which are summarized below; [ɪ] and [ʊ] are variants in rapid speech of /i/ and /u/, respectively:

	Front		Back	
	short	long	short	long
High	i		u	
Near-high	ɪ		ʊ	
Mid	ɛ	ɛː	ɔ	ɔː
Low			a	aː

=== Syllable & phonotactics ===
The Yawelmani syllables can be either a consonant-vowel sequence (CV), such as in wa 'however', or a consonant-vowel-consonant sequence (CVC), such as in xat 'eating, food'. Thus the generalized syllable is the following:

CV(C)

Verbal roots^{[b]} are disyllabic and have either one of two shapes:

- CV.CV
- CV.CVC

Outside of verbal roots, more complex phonotactic forms are also permitted, so long as each syllable has the structure CV(C).

Restrictions exist on the distribution of certain glottalized consonant phonemes in surface form: glottalized nasals and approximants cannot appear word-initially or after another consonant; if they would otherwise appear after another consonant, they lose their glottalized quality.

=== Phonological processes ===
==== Vowel shortening ====
When long vowels are in closed syllables, they are shortened:

/p’a.xaː.t’it/	→	[p’axaːt’it]	p̓axaat̕it	'mourn (passive aorist)'	(/aː/ remains long)
/p’a.xaːt’.hin/	→	[p’axat’hin]	p̓axat̕hin	'mourn (aorist)'	(/aː/ is shortened)
/ts’u.juː.hun/	→	[ts’ujɔːhun]	c̓uyoohun	'urinate (aorist)'	(/uː/ remains long)
/ts’u.juːt/	→	[ts’ujɔt]	c̓uyot	'urinate (passive aorist)'	(/uː/ is shortened)

==== Vowel harmony ====
Yawelmani has suffixes that contain either an underspecified high vowel /I/ or an underspecified non-high vowel /A/.

- Underspecified /I/ will appear as /u/ following the high rounded vowel /u/ and as /i/ following all other vowels /i, a, ɔ/:

/-hIn/			-hun/-hin	(aorist suffix)
/muʈhIn/	→	[muʈhun]	muṭhun	'swear (aorist)'
/ɡij’hIn/	→	[ɡij’hin]	giy̓hin	'touch (aorist)'
/ɡɔphIn/	→	[ɡɔphin]	gophin	'take care of infant (aorist)'
/xathIn/	→	[xathin]	xathin	'eat (aorist)'

- Underspecified /A/ will appear as /ɔ/ following the non-high rounded vowel /ɔ/ and as /a/ following all other vowels /i, u, a/:

/-tAw/			-tow/-taw	(nondirective gerundial suffix)
/ɡɔptAw/	→	[ɡɔptɔw]	goptow	'take care of infant (nondir. ger.)'
/ɡij’tAw/	→	[ɡij’taw]	giy̓taw	'touch (nondir. ger.)'
/muʈtAw/	→	[muʈtaw]	muṭtaw	'swear (nondir. ger.)'
/xattAw/	→	[xatːaw]	xattaw	'eat (nondir. ger.)'

==== Vowel epenthesis ====
Yawelmani adds vowels to stems, when suffixes with an initial consonant are affixed to word with two final consonants in order to avoid a triple-consonant-cluster.

== Grammar ==
=== Case system ===
Yawelmani is a primary object language.

A. L. Kroeber documented the language's case system in his 1907 paper The Yokuts Language of South Central California.

Case suffixes (per Kroeber)
Objective	Noun	-a (-i)
Objective	Demonstrative	-n, -in
Objective	(plural), Pronoun	-wa
Possessive		-in
Instrumental		-ni
Locative		-u
Ablative		-nit

In his 1944 grammar of the Yokuts language, Newman analyzed the case system in greater depth, taking care for the different realizations of the case suffixes with nouns based primarily on the phonotactic profile of the root or stem to which the nouns attach, as in the table below. Note that the forms represent the basic case suffixes; in Newman's analysis, vowel harmony with the preceding syllable may apply as appropriate. Elements in parentheses are analyzed by Newman to be added to the root in preparation for the affix (which he terms an "inorganic protective element"), rather than forming part of the affix itself. Moreover, Newman treats the CV:C category (his IAb type) as generally a variant of CVC (his IAa type), except for two unique members of the CV:C class, yeet'- 'one' and mooṣ- 'sweathouse'.

Case suffixes (per Newman)
	Subjective	Objective	Possessive	Indirect Objective	Ablative	Locative
CVC (IAa)	-	-i, -a	-in	(V:)-ni	(V:)-nit	(V)-w
CV:C (IAb)	-	-	-in	-ni	-nit	(V)-w
CV: (IBa)	(')-	(')-in, (')-an	(')-in	-ni	-nit	-w
CV: verb nominalizations (IBb)	(')-	-i, -a	(')-in	-ni	-nit	-w
CV.CVC (IIA)	-	-i, -a	-in	(V:)-ni	(V:)-nit	(V)-w
CV.CV:C (IIBa)	-	-, -i, -a	-in	-ni	-nit	(V)-w
CV.CV:C variant form (IIBb)	-	-	-in	-ni	-nit	(V)-w
CV.CV:C limited set of words (IIBc)	-	-i, -a	-in	(V:)-ni	(V:)-nit	(V)-w

Examples of these paradigms are provided in the following table.

Example case paradigms (per Newman)
	Word root	Subjective	Objective	Possessive	Indirect Objective	Ablative	Locative
CVC (IAa)	pil 'road'	pil	pila	pilin	pilni or pilaani	pilnit or pilaanit	pilaw
CV: (IBa)	samaa 'mouth'	sama'	samaa'in	samaa'in	samaani	samaanit	samaw
CV: verb nominalizations (IBb)	damnaa 'act of trying'	damna'	damna	damnin	damnaani	damnaanit	damnaw
CV.CVC (IIA)	biwiineelis 'one who is made to sew'	biwiineelis	biwiinelsi	biwiinelsin	biwiinelseeni	biwiinelseenit	biwiinelsiw
CV.CV:C (IIBa)	lagaa'eey 'a place for staying overnight'	lagaa'iy	lagaa'ey	lagaa'eeyin	lagaa'eyni	lagaa'eyni	lagaa'eeyaw

== Selected vocabulary ==
Yawelmani anatomy

Yawelmani kinship terms

== Notes ==
^{a} These include, for example, Kiparsky (2023).
^{b} That is, "bases" in Newman's (1944) sense.
