= Chukchansi dialect =

Valley Yokuts dialect of California

Chukchansi
- Region: San Joaquin Valley, California
- Ethnicity: Chukchansi
- Native speakers: 8 semispeakers (2011)
- Language family: Yok-Utian ?: Yokutsan; General Yokuts; Nim; Northern Yokuts; Valley Yokuts; Northern; Chukchansi

Language codes
- ISO 639-3: –
- Glottolog: None

Chukchansi (Chuk'chansi) is a dialect of Valley Yokuts spoken in and around the Picayune Rancheria of Chukchansi Indians, in the San Joaquin Valley of California, by the Chukchansi band of Yokuts. As of 2011, there were eight native semi-speakers.

== Revitalization ==
In May 2012, the Linguistics Department of Fresno State University received a $1 million grant to compile a Chuckchansi dictionary and grammar texts, and to "provide support for scholarships, programs, and efforts to assemble native texts and create a curriculum for teaching the language so it can be brought back into social and ritual use." The five-year grant was provided by the Picayune Rancheria of the Chukchansi Indians from funds generated by the Chukchansi Gold Resort & Casino, and is expected to speed existing volunteer efforts by CSU Fresno faculty to document and teach the language. However, the grant has also been criticized in connection with recent disenrollments of Chuckchansi tribal members.

Recordings of the language were made by Sydney Lamb between 1953 and 1957. Efforts at documentation of Chukchansi have also been attempted using the Phraselator, a handheld recording device developed for military purposes. "When a person speaks into the device in English, it responds with the Chukchansi translation." However, as of 2007, these devices were too expensive to be widely distributed.

Chukchansi classes have been taught at the elementary school in Coarsegold, CA since 2008. As of 2012, Chukchansi classes are available for children and adults. The Native American Coffee Company's first coffee shop, which opened in Coarsegold in 2012, plans to translate the names of its coffee drinks into Chukchansi.

Preservation of the language has evoked strong feelings. Tribal Chairman Reggie Lewis emphasized the need to "preserve, protect, and revitalize our cultural identity and traditions." One tribal member, who put it more directly, said, "When [the United States] began the genocide of Native American communities, the reason they allowed us to sign our treaties was because we had a language ... Generations of our elders went through drought and atrocities; the core of our language is our identity," adding that she was encouraged by the fact that "non-native speakers in the community come to learn the language."

== Phonology ==
The following tables are based on Collord's 1968 grammar.

Orthography is written in ⟨⟩ when applicable.

=== Consonants ===
| | | Bilabial | Dental/ Alveolar | Post- alveolar | Velar | Glottal |
|---|---|---|---|---|---|---|
| Nasal | plain | m | n | | | |
| Nasal | glottalic | mˀ ⟨mʼ⟩ | nˀ ⟨nʼ⟩ | | | |
| Plosive/ Affricate | voiceless | p ⟨b⟩ | t ⟨d⟩ | tʃ ⟨j⟩ | k ⟨g⟩ | ʔ ⟨ʼ⟩ |
| Plosive/ Affricate | aspirated | pʰ ⟨p⟩ | tʰ ⟨t⟩ | tʃʰ ⟨ch⟩ | kʰ ⟨k⟩ | |
| Plosive/ Affricate | ejective | pʼ | tʼ | tʃʼ ⟨chʼ⟩ | kʼ | |
| Fricative | | | s | ʃ ⟨sh⟩ | x | h |
| Approximant | plain | | l | j ⟨y⟩ | w | |
| Approximant | rhotic | | | (ɻ) | | |
| Approximant | glottalic | | lˀ ⟨lʼ⟩ | jˀ ⟨yʼ⟩ | wˀ ⟨wʼ⟩ | |

- /ɻ/ sound is borrowed from other languages.
- Glottalized sounds /mˀ, nˀ, lˀ, jˀ, wˀ/ are also heard as creaky-voiced [m̰, n̰, l̰, w̰, j̰].
- /l/ is generally high-tongued /l̪/ after front vowels, and is slightly lowered elsewhere.

=== Vowels ===
| | Front | Back |
|---|---|---|
| Close | i iː ⟨ii⟩ | u uː ⟨uu⟩ |
| Mid | e eː ⟨ee⟩ | o oː ⟨oo⟩ |
| Open | a aː ⟨aa⟩ | |

== Sample Text ==
The transcribed recorded passage below is an adapted version of The North Wind and the Sun.

The North Wind and the Sun

=== Phonemic transcription ===
/ˌwoʃ.ˈho.noʔ ˈnoː.tʰun̰ ˈʃokʰ.woʔ ˈʔa.maʔ joʔ ˈʔ opʰ ˈjeː.ʧ’atʰ he.ˈjeː.maʔ ˈnoː.tʰun̰ ˈʃokʰ.woʔ ˈʔa.maʔ joʔ ˈʔ opʰ ho.ˌjo:.ˈwuʃ.tʰaʔ ˌhut.ˌmaʔ.ˈʃe.xon̰ ˈʔa.mak’ ˈwatʰ ˈmiʧʰ ˈʧaw.wan ˈmi.ʔin ˈʔa.maʔ ˌnox.ˈno.xuʧ’ ˌwal.ˈxo.tʰaʔ ʔa.ˈmaː.mik pe.ˌlen.ˈwi.ʃam̰ ʔam ˈmik.ʧ’i ʧa.ˌkeː.ˈta.ʔan ˈnoː.tʰun̰ ˈʃokʰ.woʔ ˈʔa.maʔ joʔ ˈʔopʰ ˈwil.tʰaʔ ˈmiʧʰ ˈʧaw.wan ˈnah.niʔ ˈna.ʔaʃ ˌʔox.ˌjiw.ʃal ʔam ʧa.ˌkeː.ˈta.ʔan ˈmi.ʔin ˈʔa.maʔ ˈnoː.tʰun̰ ˈʃokʰ.woʔ ˌmeː.ˈʧin.tʰaʔ ˈpʰoʃ.tʰaʔ ˈpʰoʃ.tʰaʔ ˈnoː.tʰun̰ ˈʃokʰ.woʔ ˈmi.ʔin ˌmeː.ˈʧin.tʰaʔ ˌnox.ˈno.xuʧ’ pe.ˌlen.ˈwiʃ.tʰaʔ ʔam ʧa.ˌkeː.ˈta.ʔan ˈmi.ʔin ˈʔa.maʔ ˈnoː.tʰun̰ ˈʃokʰ.woʔ ka.ˌlaː.ˈpij.tʰaʔ ʔam ˈpʰoː.ʃa ˈmi.ʔin ˈʔa.maʔ ˈʔopʰ ˌmeː.ˈʧin.tʰaʔ ˌʔal.ˌʔal.ˈk’a.tʰaʔ ˈmi.ʔin ˈʔa.maʔ ˌnox.ˈno.xuʧ’ ˌmeː.ˈʧin.tʰaʔ xa.ˌp’eː.ˈla.tʰaʔ ˈmi.ʔin ʧa.ˌkeː.ˈta.ʔan ʔam ˌʔo.ˈ xij.tʰaʔ ˈmi.ʔin ˈʔa.maʔ ˈnoː.tʰun̰ ˈʃokʰ.woʔ ˈwil.tʰaʔ ˈʔopʰ ˈmiʧʰ ˈʧaw.wan/

=== Orthographic transcription ===
Woshhonoʼ Nootunʼ Shokwoʼ ʼamaʼ yoʼ ʼOp. Yeechʼat heyeemaʼ Nootunʼ Shokwoʼ ʼamaʼ yoʼ ʼOp hoyoowushtaʼ. Hudamaʼshexonʼ ʼamakʼ wat mich jawwan. Miʼin ʼamaʼ noxnoxuchʼ walxotaʼ ʼamaamig, belenwishamʼ ʼam migchʼi jageedaʼan. Nootunʼ Shokwoʼ ʼamaʼ yoʼ ʼOp wiltaʼ mich jawwan nahniʼ naʼash ʼoxyiwshal ʼam jageeda'an. Miʼin ʼamaʼ Nootunʼ Shokwoʼ meejintaʼ poshtaʼ. Poshtaʼ Nootunʼ Shokwoʼ miʼin meejintaʼ noxnoxuchʼ belenwishtaʼ ʼam jageedaʼan. Miʼin ʼamaʼ Nootunʼ Shokwoʼ galaabiytaʼ ʼam poosha. Miʼin ʼamaʼ ʼOp meejintaʼ ʼalʼalkʼataʼ. Miʼin ʼamaʼ noxnoxuchʼ meejintaʼ xapʼeelataʼ. Miʼin jageedaʼan ʼam ʼoxiytaʼ. Miʼin ʼamaʼ Nootunʼ Shokwoʼ wiltaʼ, ʼOp mich jawwan.

=== English translation ===
‘The story of North Wind and the Sun. Once a long time ago, the North Wind and the Sun argued with each other. The two of them wanted to know who was very strong. Then, a traveler, wrapping himself up in a heavy coat, passed by the two of them. The North Wind and the Sun said that the very strong one could make the traveler take off his coat. Then the North Wind blew very hard. When the North Wind blew, the traveler wrapped himself tighter in his coat. Then the North Wind gave up blowing. Then the Sun shone bright. Then the traveler got very hot. So, he took off his coat. Then the North Wind said that the Sun was very strong.’
