= Valley Yokuts =

Yokutsan dialect cluster of California, US

- Native to: United States
- Region: San Joaquin Valley, California
- Ethnicity: Yokuts
- Native speakers: 20–25 fluent and semi-speakers (2007)
- Language family: Yok-Utian ?: Yokuts; General Yokuts; Nim; Northern Yokuts; Valley Yokuts
- Dialects: Delta?; Northern; Southern

Language codes
- ISO 639-3: (included in Yokuts [yok])
- Glottolog: vall1251
- Historical distribution with dialects

Valley Yokuts is a dialect cluster of the Yokuts language of California.

Chukchansi, which is still spoken natively, has language classes and a preschool for children. It is also taught at a local elementary school. Though there are no longer any native speakers, Tachi has a Headstart language program.

Divisions of Valley Yokuts

== Varieties ==
Valley Yokuts is sometimes considered three languages.

- † Far Northern Valley Yokuts (a.k.a. Delta Yokuts)

Yachikumne (a.k.a. Chulamni)
Chalostaca
Lakisamni
Tawalimni

- Northern Valley Yokuts

Nopṭinṭe †
Chawchila †
Chukchansi
Kechayi †
Dumna †
Dalinchi †
Toltinchi †

- Southern Valley Yokuts

Wechihit †
Nutunutu–Tachi
Chunut (a.k.a. Sumtache) †
Wo’lasi–Choynok †
Wowol †
Telamni †
Koyeti–Yawelmani

Of these, Yawelmani /jɑːwɛlˈmɑːni/, also known as Yowlumni, is the best known. See also Chukchansi dialect.

== Grammar ==
- ablaut
- suffix

deeyi 'to lead'
deeyen 'he will lead'
deyhin 'he led'
diyhatinhin 'he wanted to lead'
diyee’iy 'place where one got the lead' (subjective)
diyaa’an 'he is leading'
deydiyen 'he will lead repeatedly'
diyidyiisaahin ’anam 'they led each other repeatedly'
diyeediyic’ 'one who is leading repeatedly' (subjective)
deyday 'act of leading repeatedly' (subjective)

- reduplication

’ɔɔṭ’hun 'he stole' - ’ɔɔṭ’uṭ’hun 'he stole often'
’ɔɔṭ’al 'he might steal' - ’ɔɔṭ’uṭ’al 'he might steal often'

== Bibliography ==
- Archangeli, Diana B. (1985). Extrametricality in Yawelmani. Linguistic review, 4 (2), 101–120.
- Archangeli, Diana B. (1986). Yokuts harmony: Evidence for coplanar representation in nonlinear phonology. Linguistic inquiry, 16, 335–372.
- Archangeli, Diana B. (1988). Underspecification in Yawelmani phonology and morphology. Outstanding dissertations in linguistics. New York: Garland Pub. ISBN 0-8240-5175-0. (Revision of 1984 doctoral dissertation, Massachusetts Institute of Technology).
- Archangeli, Diana B. (1991). Syllabification and prosodic templates in Yawelmani. Natural Language and Linguistic Theory 9, 231–283.
- Gamble, Geoffrey. (1975). Consonant symbolism in Yokuts. International Journal of American Linguistics, 41, 306–309.
- Harris, Zellig. (1944). Yokuts structure and Newman's grammar. International Journal of American Linguistics, 10, 196–211.
- Hockett, Charles. (1967). The Yawelmani basic verb. Language, 26, 278–282.
- Hockett, Charles. (1973). Yokuts as a testing ground for linguistic methods. International Journal of American Linguistics, 39, 63–79.
- Hymes, Dell H. (1964). Language in culture and society: A reader in linguistics and anthropology. New York: Harper & Row.
- Kuroda, S.-Y. (1967). Yawelmani phonology. Special technical report (No. 15); M.I.T. research monograph series (No. 43). Cambridge, MA: M.I.T. Press, Massachusetts Institute of Technology, Research Laboratory of Electronics.
- Kroeber, Alfred L. (1906). The Yokuts and Yuki languages. In B. Laufer & H. A. Andrews (Eds.), Boas anniversary volume (pp. 64–79). New York: G.E. Stechert & Co. (Reprinted as separate book 1906).
- Kroeber, Alfred L. (1906). The Yokuts and Yuki languages. New York: Stechert. (Originally in Laufer & Andrews 1906).
- Kroeber, Alfred L. (1907). The Yokuts language of south central California. University of California publications in American archaeology and ethnology (Vol. 2, pp. 165–377).
- Laufer, Berthold; & Andrews, H. A. (Eds.). (1906). Boas anniversary volume: Anthropological papers written in honor of Franz Boas. New York: G.E. Stechert & Co.
- Newman, Stanley S. (1932). The Yawelmani dialect of Yokuts. International Journal of American Linguistics, 7, 85–89.
- Newman, Stanley S. (1940). Linguistic aspects of Yokuts style. Anthropological Record, 5 (1), 4–15. (Reprinted in Hymes 1964).
- Newman, Stanley S. (1944). Yokuts language of California. Viking Fund publications in anthropology (No. 2). New York: Viking Fund. (Reprinted 1963 & 1968, New York: Johnson Reprint Corp.).
- Newman, Stanley S. (1946). The Yawelmani dialect of Yokuts. In C. Osgood & H. Hoijer (Eds.), Linguistic structures of native America (pp. 222–248). New York: The Viking Fund.
- Newman, Stanley S. (1964). Linguistic aspects of Yokuts style. In D. H. Hymes, Language in culture and society. New York: Harper & Row. (Originally published as Newman 1940).
- Newman, Stanley S. (1966). Word classes in Yokuts. Lingua, 17, 182–199.
- Noske, Roland. (1985). Syllabification and Syllable Changing Processes in Yawelmani. In Harry van der Hulst & Norval S.H. Smith (Eds.), Advances in Nonlinear Phonology, Dordrecht: Foris, 335–361.
- Noske, Roland. (1993). A Theory of Syllabification and Segmental Alternation. With studies on the phonology of French, German, Tonkawa and Yawelmani. Tübingen: Niemeyer.
- Osgood, Cornelius; & Hoijer, Harry (Eds.). (1946). Linguistic structures of native America. Viking fund publications in anthropology (No. 6). New York: The Viking Fund. (Reprinted 1963, 1965, 1967, & 1971, New York: Johnson Reprint Corp.).
- Pullum, Geoffrey. (1973). Yokuts bibliography: An addendum. International Journal of American Linguistics, 39, 269–271.
- Steriade, Donca. (1986). Yokuts and the vowel plane. Linguistic inquiry, 17, 129–146.
