= Tachi Yokuts =

Southern Valley Yokuts dialect of California

Tachi
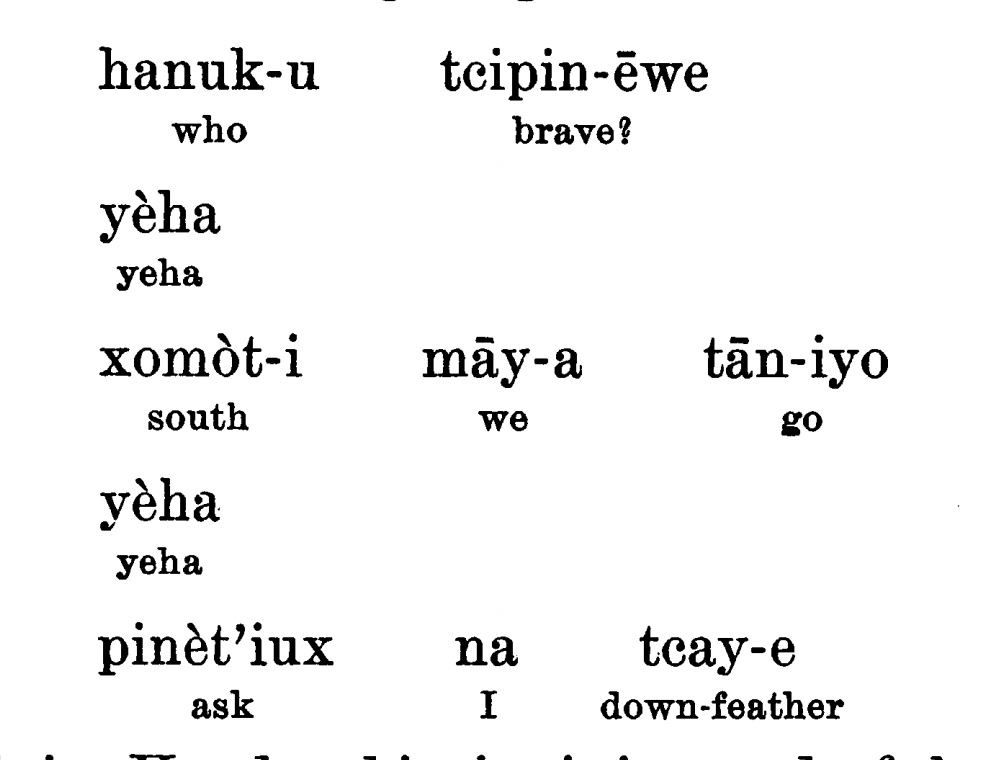
- Tachi Yokuts song recorded by A. L. Kroeber
- Native to: United States
- Region: California
- Ethnicity: Tachi Yokuts
- Native speakers: "a few" (2019)
- Language family: Yok-Utian ?: Yokutsan; General Yokuts; Nim; Northern Yokuts; Valley Yokuts; Southern; Nutunutu–Tachi; Tachi

Language codes
- ISO 639-3: –
- Glottolog: None

Tachi is an endangered dialect of Southern Valley Yokuts historically spoken north of Tulare Lake in the Central Valley of California. A. L. Kroeber estimated that Tachi was, at one point, one of the most widely spoken Yokutsan dialects.

As of 2019, a few individuals of the Santa Rosa Rancheria are reportedly able to speak Tachi.

== Grammar ==
Tachi has been described as following a subject–verb–object word order though may allow for verb-initial order. The dialect uses dative case and lacks possessed case.

== Status ==
=== Speakers ===
In 1988, an estimated 30 individuals spoke Tachi, including a number who spoke Tachi as a first language.

=== Revival efforts ===
In 1987, the Santa Rosa Rancheria piloted a language renewal program, Tachi as a Second Language, through the tribe's Head Start language program. The program sought to increase language exposure among young children within the tribe.

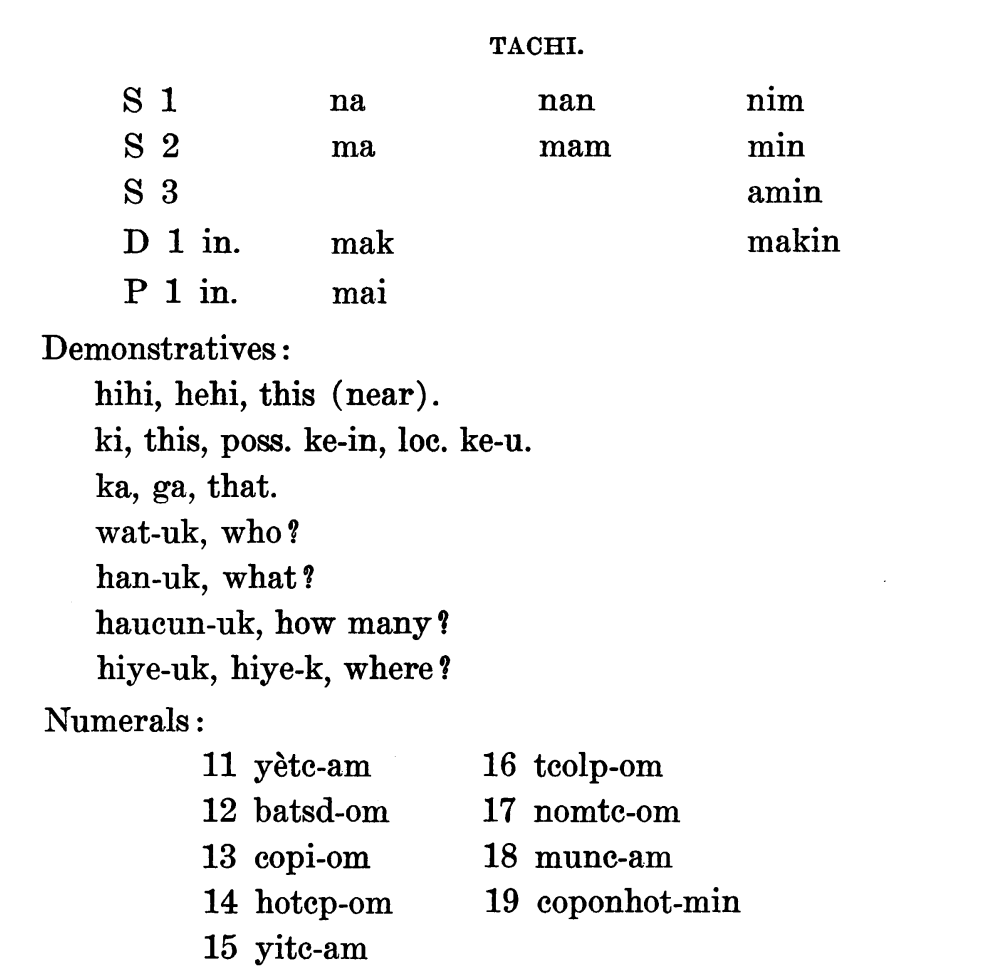
Information on Tachi published by A. L. Kroeber
