= List of Indigenous peoples in California =

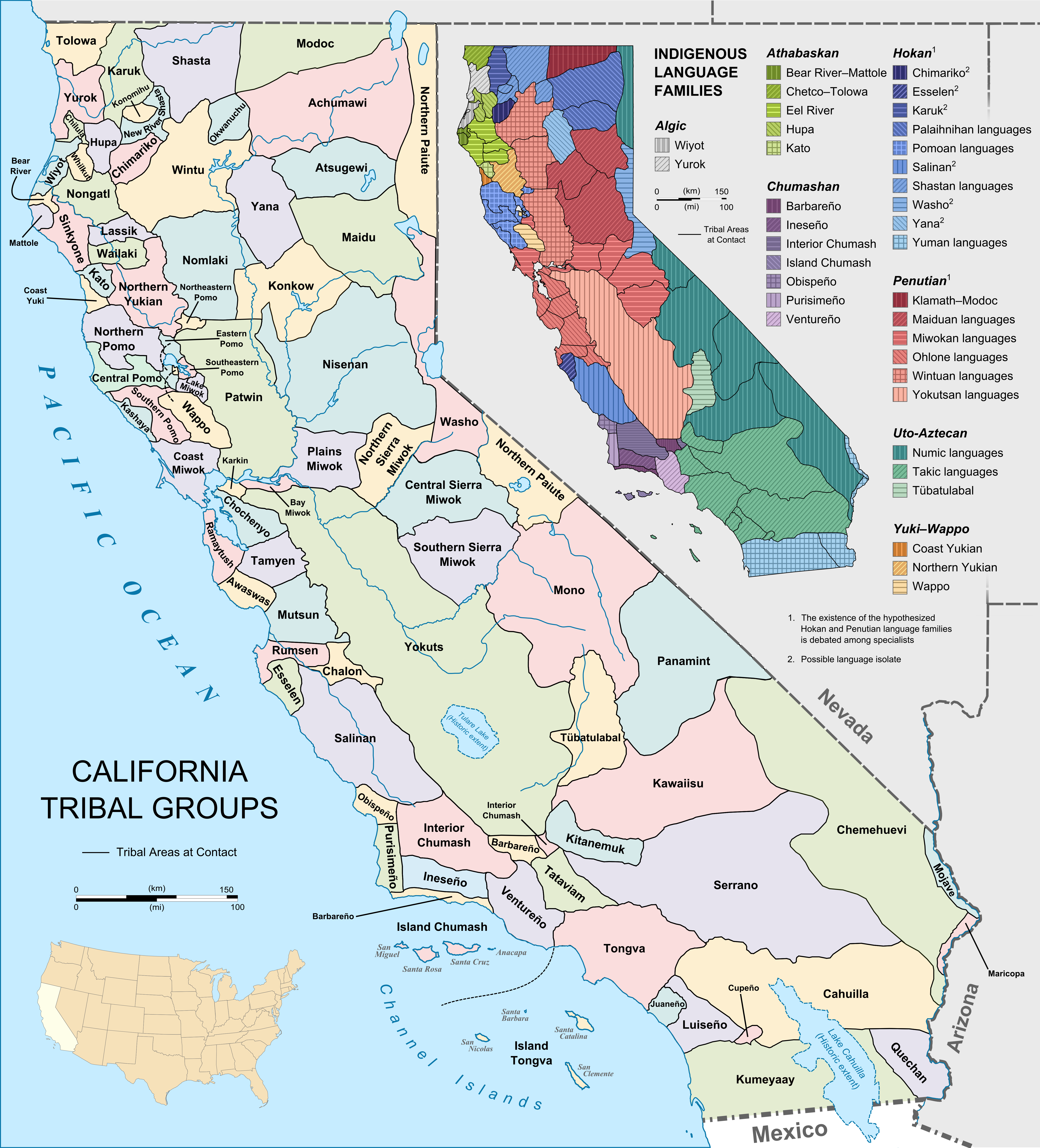
A map of California tribal groups and languages at the time of European contact.

The Indigenous peoples of California are the Indigenous inhabitants who have previously lived or currently live within the current boundaries of California before and after the arrival of Europeans.

- Achomawi, Achumawi, Pit River tribe, northeastern California
- Atsugewi, northeastern California
- Ahwahnechee, eastern-central California
- Cahuilla, southern California
- Chumash, coastal southern California
  - Barbareño
  - Cruzeño, Island Chumash
  - Inezeño, Ineseño
  - Obispeño, Northern Chumash
  - Purisimeño
  - Ventureño
- Chilula, northwestern California
- Chimariko, extinct, northwestern California
- Coso, southeastern California
- Cupeño, southern California
- Eel River Athapaskan peoples
  - Lassik, northwestern California
  - Mattole, Bear River, northwestern California
  - Nongatl, northwestern California
  - Sinkyone, northwestern California
  - Wailaki, Wai-lakki, northwestern California
- Esselen, west-central California
- Hupa, northwestern California
  - Tsnungwe
- Juaneño, Acjachemem, southwestern California
- Karok, northwestern California
- Kato, Cahto, northwestern California
- Kawaiisu, southern-central California
- Kitanemuk, southern-central California
- Kizh, southern California
- Konkow, northern-central California
- Kucadikadi, eastern-central California
- Kumeyaay, Diegueño, Kumiai, southern California
  - Cuyamaca complex, late Holocene precolumbian culture
  - Ipai, southwestern California
    - Jamul, southwestern California
  - Tipai, southwestern California and northwestern Mexico
- La Jolla complex, southern California, ca. 6050—1000 BCE
- Luiseño, southwestern California
- Maidu, northeastern California
  - Konkow, northern California
  - Mechoopda, northern California
  - Nisenan, Southern Maidu, eastern-central California
- Miwok, Me-wuk, central California
  - Coast Miwok, west-central California
  - Lake Miwok, west-central California
  - Saklan, west-central California
  - Valley and Sierra Miwok, eastern-central California
- Mohave, southeastern California
- Monache, Western Mono, central California
- Mono, eastern-central California
- Nomlaki, northwestern California
- Ohlone, Costanoan, west-central California
  - Muwekma
  - Awaswas
  - Chalon
  - Chochenyo
  - Karkin
  - Mutsun
  - Ramaytush
  - Rumsen
  - Tamyen
  - Yelamu
- Patayan, southern California
- Patwin, central California
  - Suisun, Southern Patwin, central California
- Pauma Complex, southern California, ca. 6050—1000 BCE
- Pomo, northwestern and central-western California
- Salinan, coastal central California
- Quechan, South Eastern California (Colorado River Peoples)
  - Antoniaño
  - Migueleño
- Serrano, southern California
- Shasta northwestern California
  - Konomihu, northwestern California
  - Okwanuchu, northwestern California
- Sinkyone, northwestern California
- Tataviam, Allilik (Fernandeño), southern California
- Timbisha, southeastern California
- Tolowa, northwestern California
- Tubatulabal, south-central California
  - Bankalachi, on west slopes of the Greenhorn Mountains.
  - Palagewan, on the Kern River above its confluence with the South Fork of the Kern River.
  - Tübatulabal, on the lower reaches of South Fork of the Kern River.
- Wappo, north-central California
- Washoe, northeastern California
- Whilkut, northwestern California
- Wintu, northwestern California
- Wiyot, northwestern California
- Yana, northern-central California
  - Yahi
- Yokuts, central and southern California
  - Chukchansi, Foothill Yokuts, central California
  - Northern Valley Yokuts, central California
  - Tachi tribe, Southern Valley Yokuts, south-central California
- Yuki, Ukomno'm, northwestern California
  - Huchnom, northwestern California
- Yurok, northwestern California
