= List of Ohlone villages =

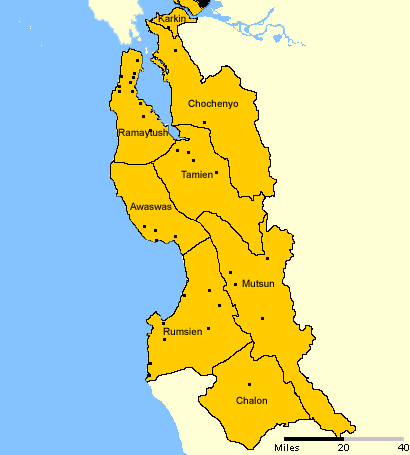
Map of the Costanoan languages and major villages.

Over 50 villages and tribes of the Ohlone (also known as Costanoan) Native American people have been identified as existing in Northern California circa 1769 in the regions of the San Francisco Peninsula, Santa Clara Valley, East Bay, Santa Cruz Mountains, Monterey Bay and Salinas Valley. The known tribe names and village locations of people who spoke the Costanoan languages are listed by regions below.

In 1925, Alfred Kroeber, then director of the Hearst Museum of Anthropology, declared the tribe extinct, which directly led to its losing federal recognition and land rights.

== San Francisco Peninsula ==
Languages spoken: Ramaytush, Tamyen on southern border

Tribes and villages of the San Francisco Peninsula:

1. Ahwaste – the San Francisco Peninsula
2. Chiguan – Pacific Coast of San Francisco Peninsula vicinity of Half Moon Bay
3. Cotegen – Pacific Coast south of Half Moon Bay
4. Lamchin – present-day San Mateo County, Bay shore from Belmont south to Redwood City and valleys to the west
5. Oljon – Pacific Coast on lower San Gregorio Creek and Pescadero Creek
6. Quiroste – Pacific Coast from Bean Hollow Creek to Ano Nuevo Creek
7. Name unknown – At Tunitas Creek
8. Ssalson (tribe) – along San Mateo Creek, in San Andreas Valley. Had 3 villages:
  - Aleitac (village) – along San Mateo Creek in San Andreas Valley
  - Altahmo (village; also spelled Altagmu) – along San Mateo Creek in San Andreas Valley
  - Uturbe (village) – along San Mateo Creek in San Andreas Valley
9. Pruristac – One mile from the Pacific Coast in San Pedro Valley, near San Pedro Creek, present day Pacifica
10. Timigtac – half mile from Pacific Coast, on bank of Calera Creek, present-day Pacifica
11. Tulomo – the San Francisco Peninsula
12. Urebure (also spelled Buriburi) – San Bruno Creek south of San Bruno Mountain
13. Yelamu (tribe) – northern San Francisco Peninsula
  - Amuctac (village) – near Visitacion Valley in San Francisco
  - Abmoctac (village) connected with Dolores Mission
  - Acnagis (village) connected with Dolores Mission
  - Acynm (village) connected with Dolores Mission
  - Aleta (village) connected with Dolores Mission
  - Aluenchi (village) connected with Dolores Mission
  - Amutaja (village) connected with Dolores Mission
  - Anamas (village) connected with Dolores Mission
  - Anamon (village) connected with Dolores Mission
  - Anchin (village) connected with Dolores Mission
  - Aramay (village) connected with Dolores Mission
  - Assunta (village) connected with Dolores Mission
  - Atarpe (village) connected with Dolores Mission
  - Cachanegtac (village) connected with Dolores Mission
  - Caprnp (village) connected with Dolores Mission
  - Carascan (village) connected with Dolores Mission
  - Cazopo (village) connected with Dolores Mission
  - Chagunte (village) connected with Dolores Mission
  - Chanigtac (village) connected with Dolores Mission
  - Chapngtac (village) connected with Dolores Mission
  - Chayen (village) connected with Dolores Mission
  - Chicntae (village) connected with Dolores Mission
  - Chiguau (village) connected with Dolores Mission
  - Chipisclin (village) connected with Dolores Mission
  - Chipletac (village) connected with Dolores Mission
  - Chiputca (village) connected with Dolores Mission
  - Chuchictac (village) connected with Dolores Mission
  - Churmutce (village) connected with Dolores Mission
  - Chuscan (village) connected with Dolores Mission
  - Chutchin (village) connected with Dolores Mission
  - Chynau (village) connected with Dolores Mission
  - Conop (village) connected with Dolores Mission
  - Elarroyde (village) connected with Dolores Mission
  - Flunmuda (village) connected with Dolores Mission
  - Gamchines (village) connected with Dolores Mission
  - Genau (village) connected with Dolores Mission
  - Guanlen (village) connected with Dolores Mission
  - Guloismistae (village) connected with Dolores Mission
  - Halchis (village) connected with Dolores Mission
  - Horocroc (village) connected with Dolores Mission
  - Huimen (village) connected with Dolores Mission
  - Hunctu (village) connected with Dolores Mission
  - Itaes (village) connected with Dolores Mission
  - Joquizara (village) connected with Dolores Mission
  - Josquigard (village) connected with Dolores Mission
  - Juniamuc (village) connected with Dolores Mission
  - Juris (village) connected with Dolores Mission
  - Lamsim (village) connected with Dolores Mission
  - Libantone (village) connected with Dolores Mission
  - Livangebra (village) connected with Dolores Mission
  - Livangelva (village) connected with Dolores Mission
  - Luianeglua (village) connected with Dolores Mission
  - Luidneg (village) connected with Dolores Mission
  - Macsinum (village) connected with Dolores Mission
  - Malvaitac (village) connected with Dolores Mission
  - Mitline (village) connected with Dolores Mission
  - Muingpe (village) connected with Dolores Mission
  - Naig (village) connected with Dolores mission
  - Olemos. A former rancheria connected with Dolores
  - Olestura rancheria connected with Dolores mission
  - Olpen rancheria connected with Dolores mission
  - Ompivromo (village) connected with Dolores mission
  - Olmolosoc rancheria connected with Dolores mission
  - Otoacte (village) connected with Dolores Mission
  - Ousint (village) connected with Dolores mission
  - Patnetac (village) connected with Dolores mission
  - Pructaca (village)connected with Dolores mission
  - Proqueu (village) connected with Dolores mission
  - Purutea (village)connected with Dolores mission
  - Puycone (village) connected with Dolores mission
  - Sadaues rancheria connected with Dolores mission
  - Sagunte (village) connected with Dolores mission
  - Saraise (village) connected with Dolores mission
  - Sarontac (village) connected with Dolores mission
  - Satumuo rancheria connected with Dolores mission
  - Saucon (village) connected with Dolores mission
  - Sicca (village) connected with Dolores mission
  - Sipanum (village) connected with Dolores mission
  - Siscastac (village) connected to Dolores Mission
  - Sitintajea rancheria connected with Dolores mission
  - Sitlintaj rancheria connected with Dolores mission
  - Ssalayme (village) connected with Dolores Mission
  - Ssichitca (village) connected with Dolores Mission
  - Ssiti (village) connected with Dolores Mission
  - Ssogereate (village) connected with Dolores Mission
  - Saupichum (village) connected with Dolores Mission
  - Subchiam (village) connected with Dolores mission
  - Suchigin (village) connected with Dolores mission
  - Suchui (village) connected with Dolores mission
  - Sunchaque (village) connected with Dolores mission
  - Tatquinte (village) connected with Dolores mission
  - Timsim (village) connected with Dolores mission
  - Titiyu (village) connected with Dolores mission
  - Torose (village) connected with Dolores mission
  - Totola (village) connected with Dolores mission
  - Tubisuste (village) connected with Dolores mission
  - Tuca (village) connected with Dolores mission
  - Tupuic (village) connected with Dolores mission
  - Tupuinte (village) connected with Dolores mission
  - Tuzsint (village) connected with Dolores mission
  - Ussete (village) connected with Dolores mission
  - Vagerpe (village) connected with Dolores mission
  - Yacomui (village) connected with Dolores mission
  - Zomiomi (village) connected with Dolores mission
  - Zucigin (village) connected with Dolores mission
  - Chutchui (village) – near the present day site of Mission Dolores in San Francisco.
  - Uchium – a division of the Olamentke, and according to Chamisso one of the most numerous connected with Dolores mission in 1816
  - Petlenuc (village) – near the Presidio of San Francisco
  - Sitlintac (village) – near Mission Creek in San Francisco
  - Tubsinta (village) – near Visitacion Valley in San Francisco
14. Puichon – near present-day Menlo Park, Palo Alto and Mountain View
15. Supinum - near present-day The Horse Park, Woodside, California, Portola Valley,
16. Tuchayune – fishing village on Yerba Buena Island

The following tribes furnished most of the converts at Mission Dolores: Ahwaste, Bolbone, Chiguau, Cuchillones, Chuscan, Cotejen, Junatca, Karkin, Khulpuni, Olemos, Olhon, Olmolococ, Olpen, Quemelentus, Quirogles, Saclan, Salzon (Suisun), Sanchines, Saucou, Sichican, Uchium and Uquitinac.

== Santa Clara Valley ==
Languages spoken: Tamyen, Mutsun, Chochenyo on eastern fringes

Tamyen language region (also spelled Tamien, Thamien) – tentatively Santa Clara Valley along Guadalupe River and west through Cupertino.

Tribes and villages of Santa Clara Valley:

1. Alson – low marshlands at southern end of San Francisco Bay, present-Day Newark, Milpitas and Alviso
2. Asirin – Coast Ranges east of Santa Clara Valley
3. Aulintac (also spelled Auxentac) – along Coyote Creek
4. Churistac – cover term for cluster of villages in the mountains east of Morgan Hill
5. Matalan – Santa Clara Valley from Coyote to Morgan Hill
6. Pala (also known as Palenos) – mountains of Hall's Valley between Santa Clara Valley and Mount Hamilton
7. Ritocsi – Santa Clara Valley at Upper Guadalupe River and central Coyote Creek
8. San Bernardino Group – Santa Clara Valley unknown location; see Partacsi
  - Lamaytu (tribe) – Santa Clara Valley
  - Muyson (tribe) – Santa Clara Valley
  - Pornen (tribe) – Santa Clara Valley
  - Solchequis (tribe) – Santa Clara Valley
9. So-co-is-u-ka (village) – the original site of the Mission Santa Clara (Mission Santa Clara de Thamien) on the Guadalupe River, 1777
10. "Santa Ysabel" – eastern Santa Clara Valley and Upper Calaveras Creek
11. Somontac (also called Santa Clara) – tentatively Los Gatos region of Santa Clara Valley, and/or a village of the Matalan
12. Thamien (village or locality) – the original site of the Mission Santa Clara (Mission Santa Clara de Thamien) on the Guadalupe River, 1777
13. Tayssen – large area of eastern Coast Ranges east and southeast of Santa Clara Valley

In vicinity:

1. Junas – probably in Hospital Creek drainage or San Antonio Valley of Diablo Range
2. Werwersen – vicinity of Mount Hamilton, Diablo Range

*See also: Chitactac, Partacsi, possibly in this valley.

== East Bay area ==
Languages spoken: Chochenyo, Karkin in the north

Tribes and villages of the East Bay area:

1. Causen (aka Patlans) – Sunol Valley
2. Huchiun – large area of East Bay shore, from Temescal Creek to present-day Richmond
3. Huchiun-Aguasto – East Bay on southeast shores of San Pablo Bay
4. Karkin (aka Los Carquines in Spanish) – on both sides of Carquinez Strait, present-day Crockett, Port Costa, Martinez and Benicia
5. Luecha – southeast of Livermore
6. Jalquin/Yrgen – present day Hayward, Castro Valley
7. Pelnen – western part of Livermore Valley, from Pleasanton to Dublin
8. Seunen – northwest side of Livermore Valley
9. Souyen – marshland of Livermore Valley and up Tassajara Creek into southern foothills of Mount Diablo
10. Ssaoam – around Brushy Peak and Altamont Pass, between Livermore Valley and San Joaquin Valley
  - Yulian (either a subgroup or alias name of Ssaoams)
11. Taunan – mountainous parts of Alameda Creek and Arroyo del Valle south to Alameda–Contra Costa County line
12. Tuibun – mouth of Alameda Creek and Coyote Hills area, eastern shore of San Francisco Bay. Site is preserved in Coyote Hills Regional Park.
13. Saclan – a former group or division of the Costanoan family inhabiting the shore at or south of Oakland

== Santa Cruz Mountains ==
Languages spoken: Awaswas, Tamyen on eastern border

Tribes and villages of the Santa Cruz Mountains:

1. Achista (tentatively included Acsaggis) – Santa Cruz Mountains, present-day Boulder Creek, and Riverside Grove
2. Chalumu – current location of city of Santa Cruz
3. Chaloctac – around Loma Prieta Creek on crest of Santa Cruz Mountains
4. Chitactac – Santa Cruz Mountains and/or Santa Clara Valley
5. Cotoni – Pacific Coast at present-day Davenport
6. Olpen (also known as Guemelentos) – interior hills and valleys in Santa Cruz Mountains, La Honda Creek, Corte de Madera Creek
7. Partacsi (also known as "Paltrastach") – Saratoga Gap mountainous area, upper Pescadero Creek, Stevens Creek, and Saratoga Creek watersheds; tentatively the village and center of San Bernardino tribal groups
8. Sayanta – Scotts Valley, Glenwood, and Laurel areas (part of Mexican grant Arrollo de Sayante)
9. Sokel – present-day Aptos

== Monterey Bay area ==
Languages spoken: Awaswas north coast, Rumsen south coast, Mutsun inland

Tribes and villages of the Monterey Bay area:

1. Aptos – Shores of Monterey Bay from Aptos east, halfway up Pajaro River
2. Cajastaca – north or northeast of Watsonville, near the Pajaro River
3. Ichxenta – at San Jose Creek, near Point Lobos State Reserve
4. Kalindaruk (Calendaruc)- Monterey County
5. Rumsien (village) – Carmel River, roughly 5 miles inland from San Carlos Mission and Pacific Coast
6. Tiubta (Settlement)
7. Uypi – present-day City of Santa Cruz
8. Wacharon – near present-day Moss Landing

== Salinas Valley ==
Languages spoken: Rumsen, Mutsun, Chalon

Tribes and villages of Salinas Valley:

1. Ansaime (also spelled Ausaima) – east side of San Felipe sink on Pacheco Creek
2. Chipuctac – Cañada de los Osos area northeast of Gilroy
3. Mutsun (village) – at the Mission San Juan Bautista, on San Benito River, west of present-day city of Hollister.
4. Pitac – possibly San Martin area or else part of Unijama in the Gilroy area
5. Tomoi – in the general area of Pacheco Pass
6. Unijaima (also spelled Unijaimas) – Gilroy and Carnadero areas
7. Wachero-n – at site of Mission Soledad on Salinas River
