= Ramaytush dialect =

Ohlone language

Ramaytush
- San Francisco
- Native to: United States
- Region: San Francisco Peninsula, California
- Ethnicity: Ramaytush people
- Extinct: (date missing)
- Revival
- Language family: Yok-Utian: Utian; Ohlone; Northern; San Francisco Bay; Ramaytush
- Writing system: Latin

Language codes
- ISO 639-3: (included in Northern Ohlone cst)
- Glottolog: sanf1261
- ELP: San Francisco Bay Costanoan (shared)

The Ramaytush dialect is one of the eight Ohlone languages, historically spoken by the Ramaytush people who were indigenous to California. Historically, the Ramaytush inhabited the San Francisco Peninsula between San Francisco Bay and the Pacific Ocean in the area which is now San Francisco and San Mateo Counties. Ramaytush is a dialect or language within the Ohlone branch of the Utian family. The term Ramaytush was first applied to it during the 1970s, and is derived from the term rammay-tuš "people from the west". It is extinct, but efforts are being taken to revive it.

The Ramaytush dialect territory was largely bordered by ocean, except in the south, which was bordered by the people of the Santa Clara Valley who spoke the Tamyen language and the people of the Santa Cruz Mountains and Pacific Coast at Point Año Nuevo who spoke dialects merging toward the Awaswas language. To the east, across San Francisco Bay, were tribes that spoke the Chochenyo language. To the north, across the Golden Gate, was the Huimen local tribe of Coast Miwok language speakers. The northernmost Ramaytush local tribe, the Yelamu of San Francisco, were intermarried with the Huchiun Chochenyos of the Oakland area at the time of Spanish colonization.

== See also ==
- Sánchez Adobe Park
- San Pedro y San Pablo Asistencia
- Utian languages
