= Tamien =

Tamien may have several meanings:

- Tamien, San Jose, California
- Tamyen dialect, an indigenous language of California
- Tamien Nation, a non-profit; see Tamien people § Territory
- Tamien people, a Native American people in Santa Clara Valley, California
- Tamien Station, a train and light rail station in San Jose, California
