= Awaswas language =

Extinct Ohlone language

Awaswas
- Santa Cruz
- Native to: United States
- Region: California
- Extinct: 19th century
- Language family: Yok-Utian: Utian; Ohlone; Northern; Awaswas
- Dialects: four varieties
- Writing system: Latin

Language codes
- ISO 639-3: (included in Northern Ohlone [cst])
- Glottolog: sant1428
- Map of Ohlone varieties with Awaswas

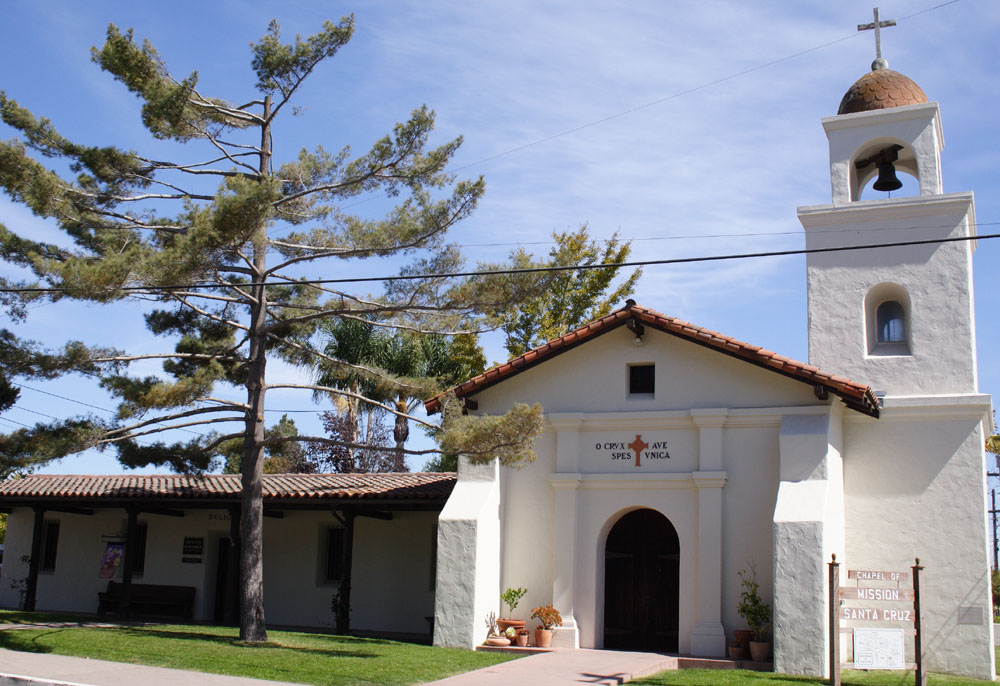
Chapel of the Mission Santa Cruz, reconstruction

Awaswas, or Santa Cruz, is one of eight Ohlone languages. It was historically spoken by the Awaswas people, an indigenous people of California. The last speaker of Awaswas died in the 19th century, and the language has been extinct ever since.

Linguists originally called the language Santa Cruz after the mission in the area, but it was renamed to Awaswas as part of a move in the late 1960s and early 1970s by graduate students at the University of California Berkeley to use native names for the Ohlone languages. 'Awaswas' is derived from the term ʔawas-was, meaning 'north-people from there'.

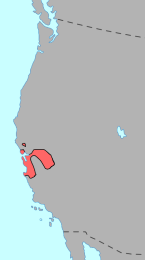
Area where the Utian languages were spoken

== History ==
The Awaswas lived in the Santa Cruz Mountains and along the coast of present-day Santa Cruz County from present-day Davenport to Aptos. Awaswas became the main language spoken at the Mission Santa Cruz. However, there is evidence that this grouping was more geographic than linguistic, and that the records of the "Santa Cruz Costanoan" language in fact represent several diverse dialects. A report from 1952 identified four different distinct forms of Costanoan and a more recent report from 2009 states, "No area in North America was more crowded with distinct languages and language families than central California at the time of Spanish contact."

The Ohlone language group is broken into branches with the most related languages grouped together. Awaswas has been grouped in both the northern and southern branches with different research disagreeing on the best fitting classification. Some branches within the Ohlone language group have been described as being as similar to each other as different local dialects of Italian, while others, such as Rumsen, Mutsun, and Awaswas "were as closely related as French, Spanish, and Portuguese."

In 2012, Amah Mutsun Tribal Chairman Valentin Lopez stated that "his great-great-grandmother was the last of the Awaswas speakers."

== See also ==
- Ohlone tribes and villages in Santa Cruz Mountains
