= Tamien people =

Native American people of the Santa Clara Valley in Northern California

Tamien
- Map of historical Tamien territory

Regions with significant populations
- Santa Clara Valley, California

Languages
- Tamyen (Santa Clara Costanoan)

Religion
- Kuksu, Ohlone mythology

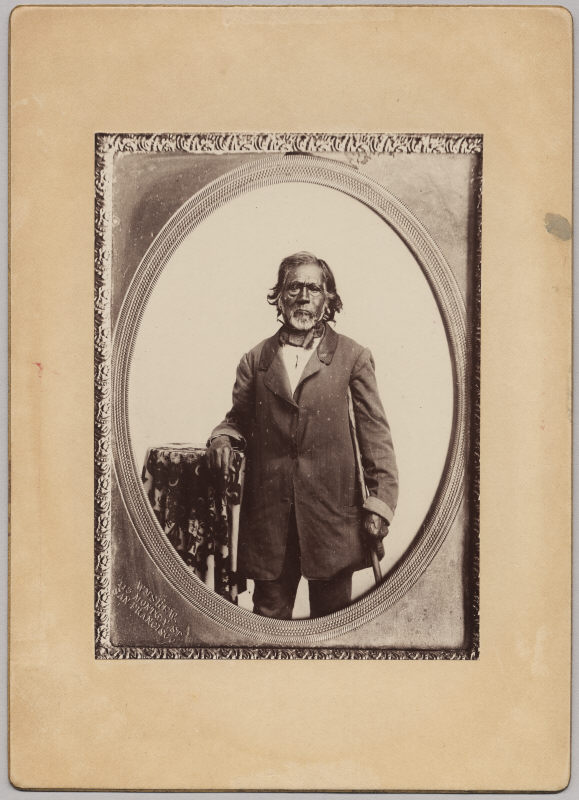
Lope Inigo, a Tamien man who lived at Mission Santa Clara de Asís

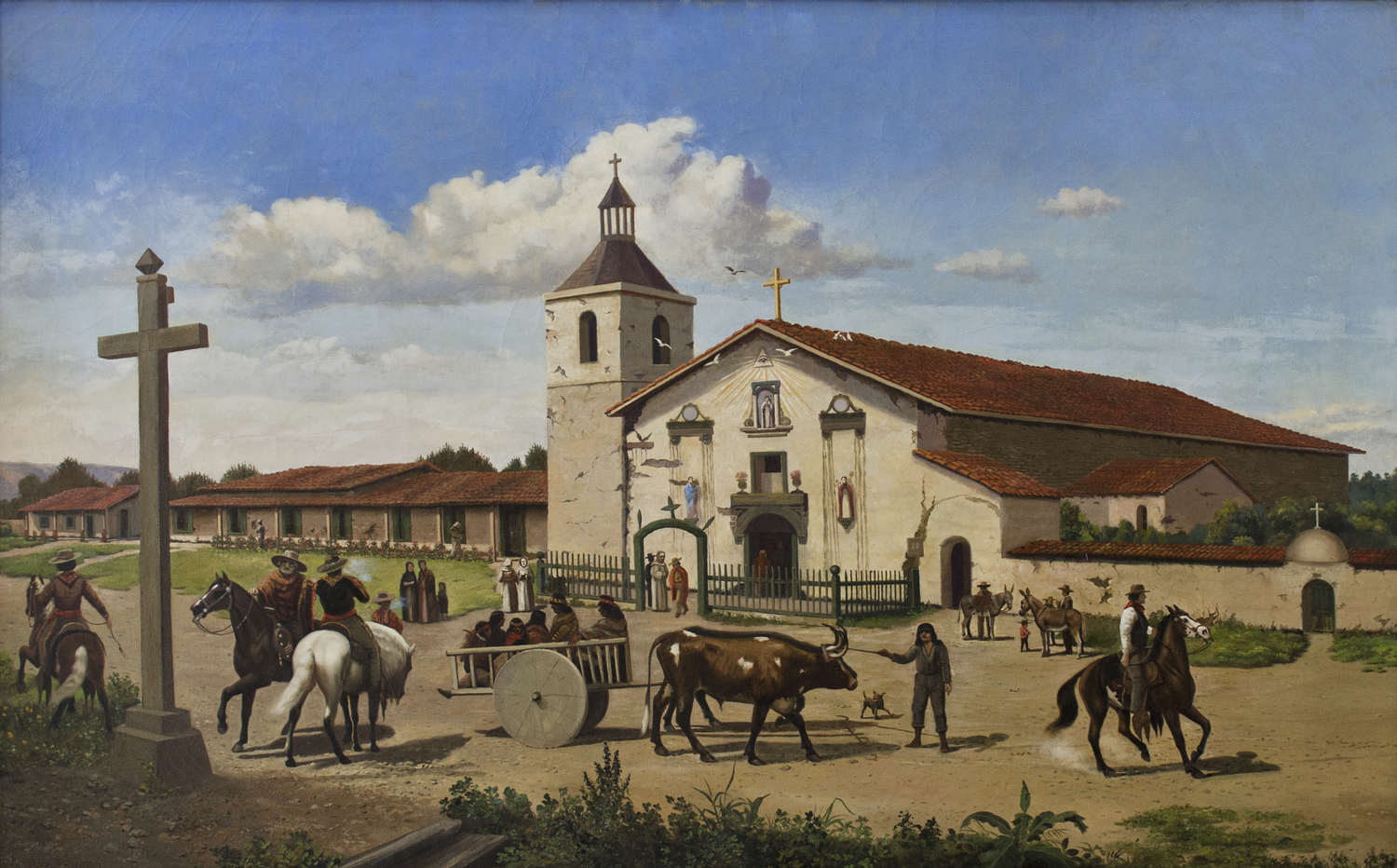
Mission Santa Clara de Asís (1849; oil on canvas)

The Tamien people (also spelled Tamyen, Thamien, or Thámien) are one of eight linguistic divisions of the Ohlone people, who are groups of Native Americans who live in Northern California. The Tamien traditionally lived throughout the Santa Clara Valley. The use of the name Tamien is on record as early as 1777; it comes from the Ohlone name for the location of the first Mission Santa Clara (Mission Santa Clara de Thamien) on the Guadalupe River. Father Padres Tomás de la Peña mentioned in a letter to Junipero Serra that the area around the mission was called Thamien by the native people. The missionary fathers erected the mission on January 17, 1777, at the native village of So-co-is-u-ka.

== Language ==
Traditionally, the Tamien people spoke the Tamyen language, a Northern Ohlone language, which ceased to be spoken since possibly the early 19th century. "Tamyen", also called Santa Clara Costanoan, has been extended to mean the Native people of Santa Clara Valley, as well as the language they spoke. Tamyen is listed as one of eight Costanoan language dialects in the Utian family, although the cogency of the Utian language grouping (combining Miwokan with Ohlone) is contested. Tamyen was the primary language of the Native people living at the first and second Mission Santa Clara (both founded in 1777). Linguistically, it is thought that Chochenyo, Tamyen, and Ramaytush are dialects of a single language. This is not to imply, however, that Chochenyo, Tamien, and Ramaytush people ever belonged to a single unified tribe.

== Territory ==
Tamien territory extends over most of the present day Santa Clara County, California, and was bordered by communities that spoke other Ohlone languages: Ramaytush to the northwest on the San Francisco Peninsula, Chochenyo, East Bay, Mutsun, south of San Martin, and the Awaswas to the southwest.

== Tribes and villages ==
The Tamyen (Tamien, Thamien) people are associated with the original site of Mission Santa Clara (Mission Santa Clara de Thamien) on the Guadalupe River, 1777. The entire Santa Clara Valley was populated with dozens of Tamyen-speaking villages, several on Coyote Creek.

== Politics and tribal controversy ==
In 1925, Alfred Kroeber, then director of the Hearst Museum of Anthropology, declared the Ohlone extinct, which directly led to the historic Verona Band of Alameda County (whose lineal descendants established the unrecognized Muwekma Ohlone Tribe) losing federal recognition and land rights. Land claims made by the Muwekma Ohlone Tribe have caused great confusion about which entity represents Tamien people. While Muwekma claims to be "comprised of all known surviving American Indian lineages aboriginal to the San Francisco Bay region who trace their ancestry through Mission Dolores (Ramaytush), Santa Clara (Tamien), and San Jose (Chochenyo)", this statement is false and the tribe is composed mainly of lineages with ancestral connections to the Pleasanton Rancheria. The Association of Ramaytush Ohlone have accused the Muwekma Ohlone Tribe of "undermin[ing] the Indigenous Sovereignty of other Bay Area Native Peoples" and partaking in "internalized colonialism and lateral oppression." The Muwekma Ohlone Tribe has also received backlash from the Tamien Nation for encroaching on Tamien Nation traditional tribal territory.

On January 25, 2022, in a virtual presentation at Santa Clara University, Tamien Nation Councilwoman Quirina Luna Geary claimed that the historic Tamien were not tribelets, rather "a nation based on Tamyen-speaking villages." Geary claims that her great-grandmother (Mutsun Ohlone) described Mutsun-speaking villages as one "Mutsun Nation"; by similar logic Geary concluded that the Tamien must have been one Tamien Nation as well, however this claim has not been proven.

In 2024, it was announced that the Tamien nation would receive $6 million in state funds in support of tribal land return and stewardship in California, as approved by Governor Gavin Newsom.

== See also ==
- Ohlone tribes and villages in Santa Clara Valley
- Namesakes:
  - Tamien Station
  - Tamien, San Jose

== General and cited references ==
- Hylkema, Mark (1994). "Tamien Station Archeological Project", published by Bean, Lowell John, editor, in The Ohlone: Past and Present Native Americans of the San Francisco Bay Region. Menlo Park, CA: Ballena Press Publication. pp. 249–270. ISBN 0-87919-129-5.
- Levy, Richard (1978). "Costanoan", in Handbook of North American Indians Vol. 8 California. William C. Sturtevant, and Robert F. Heizer, eds. Washington, DC: Smithsonian Institution. pp. 485–495. ISBN 0-16-004578-9, ISBN 0160045754.
- Milliken, Randall (1995). A Time of Little Choice: The Disintegration of Tribal Culture in the San Francisco Bay Area 1769–1910. Menlo Park, CA: Ballena Press Publication. ISBN 0-87919-132-5.
- Teixeira, Lauren (1997). The Costanoan/Ohlone Indians of the San Francisco and Monterey Bay Area: A Research Guide. Menlo Park, CA: Ballena Press Publication. ISBN 0-87919-141-4.
