= Karkin language =

Ohlone language of North America

Karkin
- Carquin
- Native to: United States
- Region: California
- Ethnicity: Karkin people
- Extinct: 1850s
- Language family: Yok-Utian: Utian; Ohlone; Karkin

Language codes
- ISO 639-3: krb
- Glottolog: kark1259
- Map of Ohlone varieties with Karkin

The Karkin language (also called Los Carquines in Spanish) is an extinct Ohlone language. It was formerly spoken in north central California, but by the 1850s there were no more native speakers. The language was historically spoken by the Karkin people, who lived in the Carquinez Strait region in the northeast portion of the San Francisco Bay estuary. The name 'Karkin' means 'trader' in some varieties of Ohlone.

Karkin's only documentation is a single vocabulary obtained by linguist-missionary Felipe Arroyo de la Cuesta at Mission Dolores in 1821. Although meager, the records of Karkin show that it constituted a distinct branch of Ohlone, strikingly different from the neighboring Chochenyo Ohlone language and other Ohlone languages spoken farther south.

== Vocabulary ==
=== Numerals ===
Numeral	Karkin
1	nisthrjan
2	othsjin
3	capjan
4	cathrahuas
5	misuru
6	tanipos
7	kenetis
8	othronacantumus
9	talan
10	tagthreithris
