= Awaswas =

Group of Ohlone Native Americans of Northern California

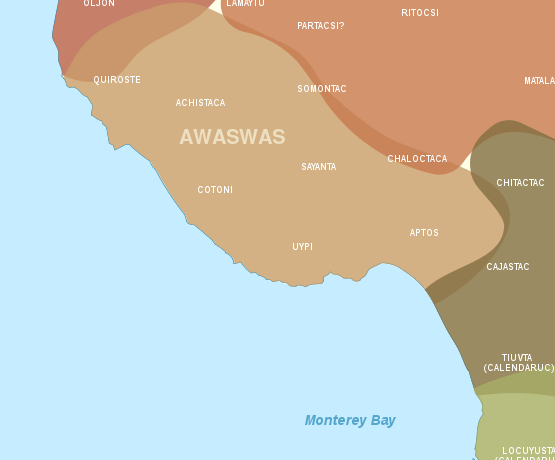
- Awaswas territory boundaries with known Indigenous tribes labeled

Total population
- c. 600 – 1,400 (1769)

Regions with significant populations
- US: CA (Santa Cruz and San Mateo Counties)

Languages
- Ohlone language (Awaswas), Spanish, English

Religion
- Traditional religion, Animism, Kuksu, Christianity

Related ethnic groups
- Mutsun, Ramaytush, Rumsen, Tamien, and other Ohlonean-speaking peoples

The Awaswas, also known as the Santa Cruz people, were a group of the Indigenous peoples of California in North America, with subgroups historically numbering about 600 to 1,400. Academic research suggests that their ancestors had lived within the Santa Cruz Mountains region for approximately 12,000 years. The Awaswas maintained regular trade networks with regional cultures before the Spanish colonists began settling in the area from the 18th century.

The Awaswas people were Ohlone, with linguistic and cultural ties to other Ohlone peoples in the region. "Ohlone" is a modern collective term for the peoples of the region; however, the term was not historically used by the Indigenous populations themselves. They did not consider themselves to be a part of a larger confederacy, but instead functioned independently of one another.

For centuries, the Santa Cruz Mountains Indigenous people experienced economic competition and military conflict with a series of colonizing newcomers. Centralized government and religious policies designed to foster language shift and cultural assimilation, as well as continued contact with the colonizers through trade, inter-marriage and other intercultural processes, have resulted in varying degrees of language death and loss of original cultural identity.

Awaswas speakers were formerly distributed over much of the northern Monterey Bay area, living along the Pacific Coast and the coastal mountain range of the Santa Cruz Mountains with territories between Point Año Nuevo and the Pajaro River in present-day Santa Cruz and San Mateo Counties.

== Etymology ==
The term Awaswas is an exonym derived from the Mutsun language that may refer and translate to "north". It may have been used by the Mutsun to refer to the Awaswas, who lived to the north of them. Unfortunately, translations for villages in Awaswas territory are difficult to piece together, as very little of the Awaswas language is still in circulation or on record. Many of the names for Monterey Bay places come from Mutsun words.

The Awaswas spoke an Ohlone dialect that has some structural affiliation to San Francisco Bay Ohlone and some affiliation to Mutsun Ohlone. An analysis of Awaswas shows it to represent disparate dialects spoken by Natives who were apparently in the midst of language shift from a divergent form of San Francisco Bay to Mutsun. There is evidence that this grouping was more geographic than linguistic, and that the records of the 'Santa Cruz Costanoan' language in fact represent several diverse dialects. Awaswas Ohlone continues to be considered a separate language, but the degree to which it originally extended to the east of present-day Santa Cruz County is completely unknown.

== Divisions ==
The Awaswas were six distinct tribes, and further branched into bands. They lived in territories marked by watersheds with ridgelines as boundaries.

=== Quiroste ===
The largest and most economically and politically powerful tribe of the Santa Cruz Mountains, the Quiroste lived at the northern edge of the mountain range on the Pacific Coast from Bean Hollow south to Año Nuevo Creek, and inland to Butano Ridge. The Quiroste derived their political influence from controlling the production of Monterey chert arrowheads and Olivella snail shell beads, the latter being used as currency throughout Indigenous California.

Two known villages were Churmutcé (south of Oljons, present-day Pescadero) and Mitenne (west of Chipletac) at Whitehouse Creek. It was at Mitenne that the Portola Expedition first encountered the Awaswas on October 23, 1769. At the time of their first interactions with the Spanish, the chief of the Quiroste was Charquin. The Spanish renamed the people "San Rafael".

=== Cotoni ===
Just south of the Quiroste and north of the Uypi, the Cotoni lived along the Pacific Ocean, near present-day Davenport, likely including the inland ridge of Ben Lomond Mountain in the Bonny Doon area. They subsisted on shellfish from the coast and carried them to the hills, where their villages were located. Two known villages were Asar and Jlli.

- Achistaca (Mutsun: "Place of the Enemy/Competitor")

An inland Cotoni group that lived in the Santa Cruz Mountains away from the coast. It is believed that they lived in the upper San Lorenzo River drainage near the present-day towns of Boulder Creek and Riverside Grove. They held kinship ties with the Cotoni, Sayanta, and Chaloctaca. The Spanish renamed the people "San Dionisio".

=== Uypi ===
The Uypi were concentrated along the mouth of the San Lorenzo River in present-day Santa Cruz and Soquel Creek. Uypi territory was rich in fields and coastal terraces. Three known villages were Aulintak ("Place of Red Abalone", near the river mouth), Chalumü (about one mile northwest of Aulintak, present-day Westlake neighborhood), and Hottrochtac (one mile further northwest). They held kinship ties with the Aptos, Sayanta, Cajastaca, Chaloctaca, Cotoni, Pitac, and Chitactac. At the time of their first interactions with the Spanish, the chief of the Uypi was Soquel ("Laurel Tree").

The Spanish identified Aulintak as an ideal settlement site for Mission Santa Cruz and renamed the people "San Daniel". By 1810, the Spanish began to call the Uypi tribe the Soquel tribe.

=== Aptos ===
At the southern edge of Uypi territory, bound by Aptos Creek and Monterey Bay at the western edge of their land, and eastward about halfway to the Pajaro River, lived the Aptos ("The People"). The Aptos tribe was one of the larger Awaswas groups in the region. They held kinship ties with the Uypi, Calendaruc (a Mutsun speaking people), and Cajastaca. At the time of their first interactions with the Spanish, the chief of the Aptos was Molegnis. The Spanish renamed the people "San Lucas".

- Cajastaca

Living to the south of the Aptos, the Cajastaca ("Jackrabbit") were a sub-group of the larger Aptos tribe. The Spanish renamed the people "San Antonio".

=== Sayanta ===
The Sayanta tribe was a smaller Awaswas group that lived in the Santa Cruz Mountains around the Zayante Creek drainage, near present-day Scotts Valley, Glenwood, and Laurel to the north and east. They held kinship ties with the Chaloctaca and Achistaca. The Spanish renamed the people "San Juan Capistrano".

=== Chaloctaca ===
The Chaloctaca lived along the crest of the Santa Cruz Mountains around Loma Prieta Creek. They may have been a separate village community of one larger group with the Sayanta. They held kinship ties with the Sayanta, Achistaca, Cotoni, Partacsi of Santa Clara Valley, and Somontoc. The Spanish renamed the people "Jesus" (Mission Santa Cruz) and "San Carlos" (Mission Santa Clara de Asís).

== History ==
Map showing the Awaswas amongst the Ohlone tribes.

The Awaswas were one of the Ohlone peoples, with linguistic and genetic ties to other Ohlone groups, such as peoples of the Mutsun, Ramaytush, Rumsen, and Tamien. The Santa Cruz Mountain tribes were united linguistically, as they spoke a language called Awaswas, a branch of the larger Ohlonean language family. They inhabited multilingual regions interconnected through shared symbols and rituals as well as monetary, trade, and complex kinship relationships. This shared culture connected with a larger Indigenous California, where long-distance trade relations and communication characterized linguistically diverse societies that shared a variety of resources and practicies, spiritual and physical, tracing back over thousands of years.

Santa Cruz had been the home to the Awaswas people whose self-sustaining culture supported them in the coastal bioregion of the Monterey Bay for more than 12,000 years. Archaeological excavations suggest these early dates but it is possible that human habitation goes back further, as it is generally believed that sites of earlier habitation may have been washed away by stream action or submerged on the continental shelf. Archaeological evidence points to a major change beginning around 1,000 years old, with the arrival of new technologies such as notched line sinkers and circular shell fishhooks, bows and arrows, flanged steatite pipes, stone "flower-pot" mortars, new Olivella shell bead types, and "banjo" effigy ornaments signifying the development of the Kuksui secret society.

=== Spanish period (1769-1821) ===
==== Under Spanish rule ====
When the Portolá expedition arrived on October 23, 1769, near Año Nuevo, Awaswas-speaking Quiroste representatives from Mitenne village welcomed the expedition, exchanging food for Spanish glass beads and cloth; an overture which was readily accepted by the Spanish. The expedition was traveling through the area during the fall, a time when Awaswas tribes left their coastal village sites for their winter forest homes to hunt and gather, not encountering people and, being unfamiliar with the land, were badly in need of food. Shortly after the Portolá expedition returned to Monterey, permanent Spanish settlement began in the region, with the founding of Mission San Carlos Borromeo de Carmelo in June 1770.

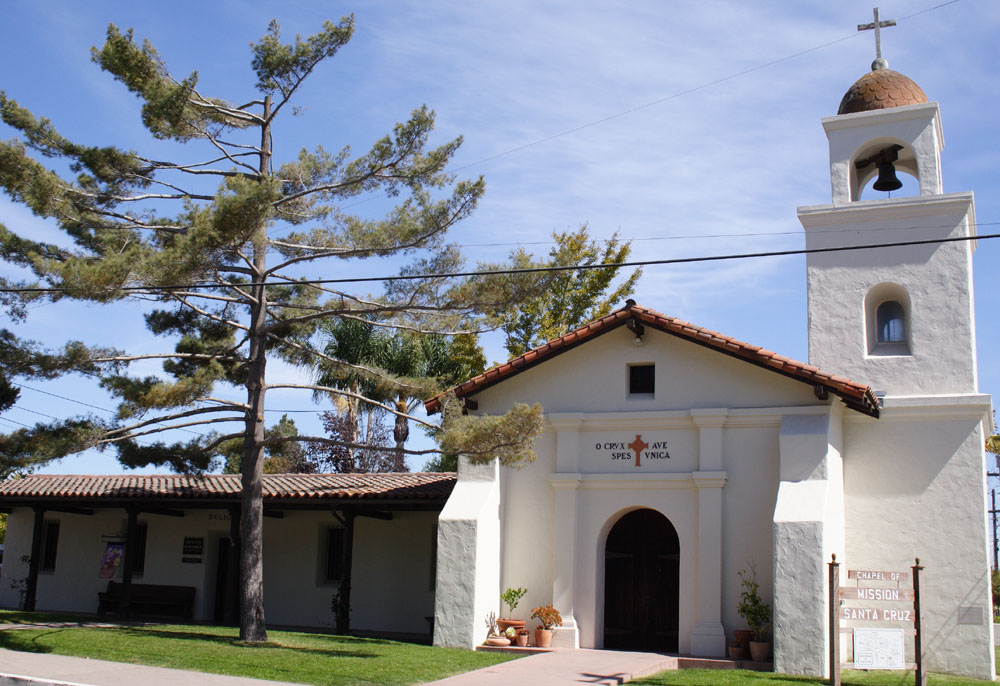
Reduced scale reconstruction of the 1795 Mission Santa Cruz Parish Chapel.

The slow conversion of the Awaswas began after the founding of Mission San Francisco de Asís in October 1776 and Mission Santa Clara de Asís in June 1777. Quiroste people appear among the early San Francisco Peninsula coastal groups baptized at Mission San Francisco, starting in 1787 and 1788.

The Spanish called the Awaswas "the Santa Cruz people" and theirs became the main language spoken at the Mission Santa Cruz. The Franciscans named local tribes after saints. During the era of Spanish missions in California, the Awaswas people's lives changed with the Mission Santa Cruz (founded in 1791) built in their territory. Most were forced into slavery at this mission and were baptized, lived and educated to be Catholic neophytes, also known as Mission Indians, until the missions were discontinued by the Mexican Government in 1834.

==== Loss of recognition ====
In 1925, Alfred Kroeber, then director of the Hearst Museum of Anthropology, declared the Ohlone extinct, which directly led to the tribe's losing federal recognition and land rights.

== Legacy ==
There are no living survivors of the Awaswas, who are spoken for by the Amah Mutsun Tribal Band.

In 2011, a march was held in Santa Cruz to preserve "the Knoll", the 6,000-year-old burial site of a child, located near Branciforte Creek.

Awaswas people, the "documented descendants of Missions San Juan Bautista and Santa Cruz", have become members of the Amah Mutsun tribal band. In 2012, Amah Mutsun Tribal Chairman Valentin Lopez stated that "tribe members are scattered. Few can afford to live in their historic lands today," and many now make their homes in the Central Valley.

== See also ==
- California genocide
- Ohlone tribes and villages in Santa Cruz Mountains
- Mission Indians
- Population of Native California
- Reductions
- Slavery among Native Americans in the United States

== General and cited references ==
- Kroeber, Alfred L. (1925). Handbook of the Indians of California. Bureau of American Ethnology Bulletin No. 78. Washington, D.C: Government Printing Office; Smithsonian Institution. p. 465 (map of villages).
  - Kroeber, A. L. (1966) [1925]. Handbook of the Indians of California (registration required) (reprint ed.). Bureau of American Ethnology Bulletin No. 78. Berkeley, Calif.: California Book Company. p. 465 (map of villages).
- Milliken, Randall (1995). A Time of Little Choice: The Disintegration of Tribal Culture in the San Francisco Bay Area 1769-1910. Menlo Park, CA: Ballena Press Publication. ISBN 0-87919-132-5 (alk. paper).
- Rizzo-Martinez, Martin (2022). We Are Not Animals: Indigenous Politics of Survival, Rebellion, and Reconstitution in Nineteenth-Century California. University of Nebraska Press.
- Teixeira, Lauren (1997). The Costanoan/Ohlone Indians of the San Francisco and Monterey Bay Area, A Research Guide. Menlo Park, CA: Ballena Press Publication. ISBN 0-87919-141-4.
- Yamane, Linda, ed. (2002). "A Gathering of Voices: The Native Peoples of the Central California Coast". Santa Cruz County History Journal, Number 5. Santa Cruz, CA: Museum of Art & History. ISBN 0-940283-11-5.
