= Rumsen language =

Extinct Utian language of California

Rumsen
- San Carlos, Rumsun, Rumsien
- Native to: United States
- Region: California
- Ethnicity: Rumsen people
- Extinct: May 21, 1939, with the death of Isabel Meadows
- Language family: Yok-Utian: Utian; Costanoan; Southern; Rumsen
- Writing system: Latin

Language codes
- ISO 639-3: (included in Southern Ohlone [css])
- Glottolog: rums1243

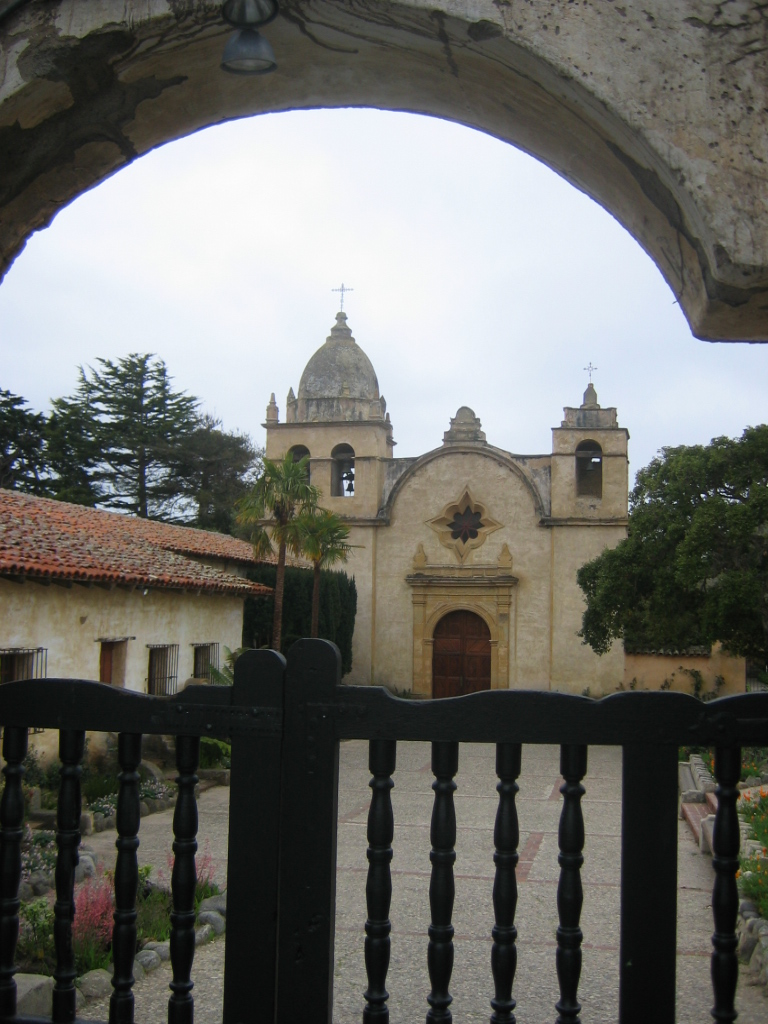
Mission San Carlos Borroméo de Carmelo, where many Rumsen were brought to live in the Mission Era

The Rumsen language (also known as Rumsien, Rumsun, San Carlos Costanoan and Carmeleno) is one of eight Ohlone languages, historically spoken by the Rumsen people of Northern California. The Rumsen language was spoken from the Pajaro River to Point Sur, and on the lower courses of the Pajaro, as well as on the Salinas and Carmel Rivers, and the region of the present-day cities of Salinas, Monterey and Carmel.

Myth of the Coyote in the Rumsen language recorded by Alfred L. Kroeber in 1902

Body parts in Rumsen

== History ==
One of eight languages within the Ohlone branch of the Utian family, it became one of two important native languages spoken at the Mission San Carlos Borroméo de Carmelo founded in 1770, the other being the Esselen language.

The last fluent speaker of Rumsen was Isabel Meadows, who died in 1939. The Bureau of American Ethnology linguist John Peabody Harrington conducted very extensive fieldwork with Meadows in the last several years of her life. These notes, still mostly unpublished, now constitute the foundation for current linguistic research and revitalization efforts on the Rumsen language. The Costanoan Rumsen Carmel Tribe has been in the process of reestablishing their language. They have begun efforts to teach their tribal members Rumsen and are working to complete a revised English - Rumsen Dictionary.

== Rumsen-speaking tribes ==
Dialects of the Rumsen language were spoken by four independent local tribes, including the Rumsen themselves, the Ensen of the Salinas vicinity, the Calendaruc of the central shoreline of Monterey Bay, and the Sargentaruc of the Big Sur Coast. The territory of the language group was bordered by Monterey Bay and the Pacific Ocean to the west, the Awaswas Ohlone to the north, the Mutsun Ohlone to the east, the Chalon Ohlone on the south east, and the Esselen to the south.

== Phonology ==
Consonant phonemes
	Labial	Dental	Retroflex	Palatal	Velar	Glottal
Nasal	m ⟨m⟩	n ⟨n⟩				
Plosive	p ⟨p⟩	t ⟨t⟩	ʈ ⟨ṭ⟩		k ⟨k⟩	ʔ
Affricate		ts ⟨ts⟩		t͡ʃ ⟨č⟩		
Fricative		s ⟨s⟩	ʂ ⟨ṣ⟩	ʃ ⟨š⟩	x ⟨x⟩	
Approximant	w ⟨w⟩	l ⟨l⟩		j ⟨y⟩		
Tap		ɾ ⟨r⟩				
Trill		r ⟨rr⟩				

Vowel phonemes
	Front	Back
Close	i ⟨i⟩	u ⟨u⟩
Mid	ɛ ⟨e⟩	o ⟨o⟩
Open		ɑ ⟨a⟩

== See also ==
- Ohlone tribes and villages in the Monterey Bay Area
- Abalone, which is an English word loaned from Rumsen
