= Ramaytush =

Linguistic subdivision of Ohlone people

Map of Ramaytush tribelets and villages at the time of contact

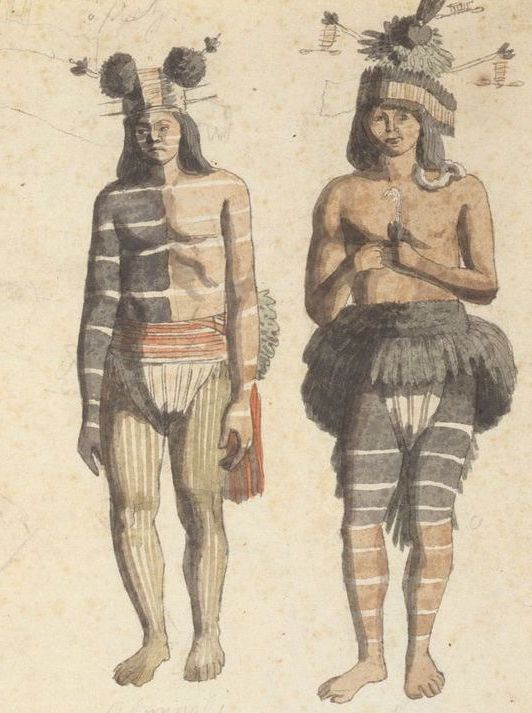
Ramaytush dancers at Mission San Francisco de Asís in modern San Francisco, California

The Ramaytush (/rɑːmaɪtuʃ/) or Rammay-tuš people are a linguistic subdivision of the Ohlone people of Northern California. The term Ramaytush was first applied to them in the 1970s, but the modern Ohlone people of the peninsula have claimed it as their ethnonym. The ancestors of the Ramaytush Ohlone people have lived on the peninsula—specifically in contemporary San Francisco and San Mateo county—for thousands of years. Prior to the California genocide, the Ohlone people were not consciously united as a singular socio-political entity. In the early twentieth century anthropologists and linguists began to refer to the Ramaytush Ohlone as San Francisco Costanoans—the people who spoke a common dialect or language within the Costanoan branch of the Utian family. Anthropologists and linguists similarly called the Tamyen people Santa Clara Costanoans, and the Awaswas people Santa Cruz Costanoans.

The homeland of the Ramaytush is largely surrounded by ocean and sea, the exception being the valley and the mountains to the southeast, home to the Tamyen Ohlone and Awaswas Ohlone, among others. To the east, across San Francisco Bay, what is now known as Alameda County is home to the Chochenyo Ohlone. To the north, across the Golden Gate, was a Huimen Miwok village. The northernmost Ramaytush local tribe—the Yelamu tribe of what is now San Francisco—was closely connected with the Huchiun Chochenyos of what is now Oakland, and members of the two tribes frequently intermarried at the time of Spanish colonization.

European disease took a heavy toll of life on all Indigenous people who came to Mission Dolores after its creation in 1776. The Ohlone people were forced to use Spanish resulting in the loss of their language. The Spanish rounded up hundreds of Ohlone people at Mission Dolores and took them to the north bay to construct Mission San Rafael. Although none of their villages survived, four branches of one lineage are known to have survived the genocide.

In 1925, Alfred Kroeber, then director of the Hearst Museum of Anthropology, declared the Ohlone extinct, which directly led to the tribe losing federal recognition and land rights.

== Etymology ==
The term "Ramaytush" (Rammay-tuš) meaning "people from the west," is a Chochenyo word the Ohlone of the East Bay used to refer to their westward neighbors. The term was adopted by Richard L. Levy in 1976 to refer to this peninsular linguistic division of the Ohlone which are the Ramaytush.

== Ramaytush tribes and villages ==
Ramaytush groups, for the most part independent territorial local tribes, include:

The Yelamu group, probably a multi-village local tribe, with the following villages within the present City and County of San Francisco:

- The location of Yelamu villages in modern San Francisco
  Chutchui also listed as Suchui in Mission Dolores Registry – on Mission Creek, the latter in the vicinity of Mission Dolores. The Mission also had a Christianized named for Chutchui which was Nuestra Senora de la Asumpcion. The burial ground (shellmound) for Chutchui was located on where the Marshall school (15th Street & Capp Street) is located today
- Sitlintac also listed as Sitinac in Mission Dolores Registry – near Chutchui
- Amuctac and Tubsinte – in Visitacion Valley, San Francisco.
- Amutaja – Adjoining Canada de la Visitacion (Visitation)
- Petlenuc – near the San Francisco Presidio.
- Mitline – near Lake Merced
- Opuromo – beach side of Lake Merced

On San Francisco Bay, south of San Francisco:

- Siplichiquin – on San Bruno Mountain in South San Francisco.
- un-named village CA-SMA-299 on present-day El Camino Real in South San Francisco.
- Urebure – San Bruno Creek near San Bruno Mountain.
- Altamu – San Mateo
- Chagunte – San Bruno
- Chioischin – San Bruno
- Malsaitac – near San Mateo
- Shalson (spelled Ssalson by Spanish missionaries) along San Mateo Creek and in the contiguous San Andreas Valley (present-day San Mateo). Their permanent or semi-permanent villages included:
  - Aleitac – along San Mateo Creek in San Andreas Valley.
  - Altahmo – (also spelled Altagmu) – along San Mateo Creek, in San Mateo or in the San Andreas Valley.
  - Tunmuda – near San Mateo Creek
  - Uturbe – along San Mateo Creek, probably in San Mateo, less likely in the San Andreas Valley.
- Lamchin lived along Pulgas Creek in the present city of San Carlos and several other nearby villages appear in the mission records
  - Chachanegtac – Main village along Pulgas Creek
  - Ussete – near Pulgas Creek
  - Gulcismijtac (also spelled Guloisnistac) – North of Pulgas Creek
  - Oromstac – near Pulgas Creek
  - Supichum (also spelled Ssupichom) – San Mateo
- Puichon – lower San Francisquito Creek and nearby areas (present-day Cities of Palo Alto and Mountain View).

On the Pacific Coast, south of San Francisco:

- Aramai – coastal valleys just south of San Francisco. Its constituent villages were:
  - Timigtac on Calera Creek in modern-day Pacifica.
  - Pruristac on San Pedro Creek in modern-day Pacifica.
- Chiguan
  - Ssatumnumo – Princeton Point
  - Chagunte – near Half Moon Bay
- Cotegen – Tunitas Creek and adjoining areas south of Half Moon Bay.
- Oljon – Lower San Gregorio and Pescadero creeks, north of Point Ano Nuevo.

Other Villages (known as Rancherias by the Spanish) listed in San Francisco Mission De Asiss registry that are not given specific locations:

- Aluenchi
- Amictu
- Atarpe
- Chimus
- Chirau
- Chocoayco
- Chupanes
- Chynan Jumiamuc
- Conap
- Cosapa
- Geluasibe
- Liuanegtur
- Macsinum
- Olestura
- Ousint
- Payesone
- Puichon
- Pusuay
- Septuca
- Subchiam
- Toquisara
- Tuzsint
- Uturpe

== Ramaytush Ohlone people ==
- 1777 – Chamis of the village Chutchui. On June 24, 1777, at age 20 he became the first neophyte to join the Mission San Francisco by baptism. He was given the Christian name of Francisco Moraga. No Mission Indian would be given a last name. Chamis would also be the first to be married on April 27, 1778 to the Ohlone woman with the Christian name Catarina de Bononia. Between 1777 and 1850 7,280 Ohlone people were baptized at Mission Dolores.
- 1777 – Pilmo from Playa de la Dolores is 2nd baptized on June 24, 1777 and given the name Jose Antonio.
- 1777 – Taulvo from Playa de la Dolores is 3rd baptized on June 24, 1777 and given the name Juan Bernardino.
- 1777 – Xigmacse, A Yelamu chief, at the time of the establishment of the Mission San Francisco.
- 1779 – Charquín, given the baptismal name of Francisco in the same year, appears to have been the leader of the first band of runaways in 1789. Exiled to San Diego, he died there in the spring of 1798.
- 1783 – Mossués, captain of the village Pruristac, baptized in 1783
- 1797 – Valeriano and Jorge elected Alcalde of Mission SF de Assis. California's first governor Felipe de Neve ordered the Missions to elect local Alcaldes around 1779.List of pre-statehood mayors of San Francisco
- 1797 – Acursio and Fermin elected regidores (council members) at Mission SF Assis.
- 1798 – Biridianna, last living Chutchui villager to have witnessed the founding of Mission Dolores.
- 1804 – Poylemja, ceremonially reburied at Dolores cemetery. {not Ramaytush but Chochenyo}
- 1807 – Hilarion and George (their baptismal names) were two Ohlone men from the village Pruristac who served as alcaldes (mayors) of the Mission San Francisco in 1807.
- 1807 – Jocnocme, ceremonially reburied at Dolores cemetery.
- 18?? – 1823- Pomponio of Half Moon Bay led raids against Mission Dolores, taking livestock and horses. He was caught, escaped, recaptured, and then executed.
- 18?? – Monica worked as a boatman for William Richardson, who built the first house in Yerba Buena in 1836. Monica told Richardson about the oral history of a time prior to the opening now known as the Golden Gate.
- 1842 – José Antonio – age 16, one of the last twelve known Ohlone living in SF. All Ohlone people at the Mission would be given the name of a Catholic saint upon baptism. None would be given a last name and be designated in the census as either a neofita or neofito in the census.
- 1842 – Alejo – age 35, one of the last twelve known Ohlone living in SF.
- 1842 – Pablo – age 18, one of the last twelve known Ohlone living in SF.
- 1842 – Junipero – age 43, one of the last twelve known Ohlone living in SF.
- 1842 – José Ramon – age 16, one of the last twelve known Ohlone living in SF.
- 1842 – Josefa – age 14, one of the last twelve known Ohlone living in SF.
- 1842 – Consolacion – age 12, one of the last twelve known Ohlone living in SF.
- 1842 – Ygnacio – age 53, one of the last twelve known Ohlone living in SF.
- 1842 – Dunas – age 49, one of the last twelve known Ohlone living in SF.
- 1842 – Forcuata – age 40, one of the last twelve known Ohlone living in SF.
- 1842 – José – age 16, one of the last twelve known Ohlone living in SF.
- 1842 – José D. – age 3, one of the last twelve known Ohlone living in SF.
- 1893 – Pedro Evencio has been called the last (Ramaytush) Native American of San Mateo. His son José Evencio lived at Coyote Point until World War II; his final whereabouts are unknown.
- 1950s – Andrés Osorio of Half Moon Bay, said to be the area's last "Indian", possibly Tulare or Mexican.

== See also ==
- Sánchez Adobe Park
- San Pedro y San Pablo Asistencia
- Ramaytush language
- List of Ohlone villages
