= Ohlone languages =

Revitalizing Utian language family of California

Ohlone
- Costanoan, Ohlonean
- Geographic distribution: San Francisco Bay Area
- Ethnicity: Ohlone
- Extinct: 1950s
- Linguistic classification: Yok-Utian: Utian; Ohlone
- Subdivisions: Karkin †; Northern; Southern †

Language codes
- Glottolog: cost1250
- Pre-contact distribution of the Ohlone languages
- Notes: ISO 639-3 codes: krb: Karkin; cst: N. Costanoan; css: S. Costanoan

The Ohlone languages, also known as Costanoan, form a small Indigenous language family historically spoken in Northern California, both in the southern San Francisco Bay Area and northern Monterey Bay area, by the Ohlone people. Along with the Miwok languages, they are members of the Utian language family. The most recent work suggests that Ohlone, Miwok, and Yokuts are branches of a Yok-Utian language family.

Myth of the Coyote in the Rumsen language recorded by Alfred Kroeber in 1902

== Languages ==
Ohlone comprises eight attested varieties: Awaswas, Chalon, Chochenyo (also spelt as Chocheño), Karkin, Mutsun, Ramaytush, Rumsen, and Tamyen. Overall, divergence among these languages seems to have been roughly comparable to that among the languages of the Romance sub-family of Indo-European languages. Neighboring groups seem to have been able to understand and speak to each other.

The number and geographic distribution of Ohlone language divisions partially mirrors the distribution of Franciscan missions in their original lands. While the known languages are, in most cases, quite distinct, intermediate dialects may have been lost as local groups gathered at the missions. A newly discovered text from Mission Santa Clara provides evidence that Chochenyo of the East Bay area and Tamyen of the Santa Clara Valley were closely related dialects of a single San Francisco Bay Ohlone language.

The last native speakers of Ohlone languages died by the 1950s. However, Chochenyo, Mutsun, and Rumsen are now in a state of revival (relearned from saved records).

The classification below is based primarily on Callaghan (2001). Other classifications list Northern Costanoan, Southern Costanoan, and Karkin as single languages, with the following subgroups of each considered as dialects:

- Ohlone
  - Karkin (also known as Carquin)
    Vincent Medina presents in the Chochenyo Ohlone language at the San Francisco Public Library.
  - Northern Costanoan
    - San Francisco Bay Costanoan
      - Tamyen (also known as Tamien, Santa Clara Costanoan)
      - Chochenyo (also known as Chocheño, Chocheno, East Bay Costanoan)
      - Ramaytush (also known as San Francisco Costanoan)
    - Awaswas (also known as Santa Cruz Costanoan) – There may have been more than one Costanoan language spoken within the proposed Awaswas area, as the small amount of linguistic material attributed to Mission Santa Cruz Costanoans is highly variable.
    - Chalon (also known as Cholon, Soledad) – Chalon may be a transitional language between Northern and Southern Costanoan.
  - Southern Costanoan
    - Mutsun (also known as San Juan Bautista Costanoan)
    - Rumsen (also known as Rumsien, San Carlos, Carmel)

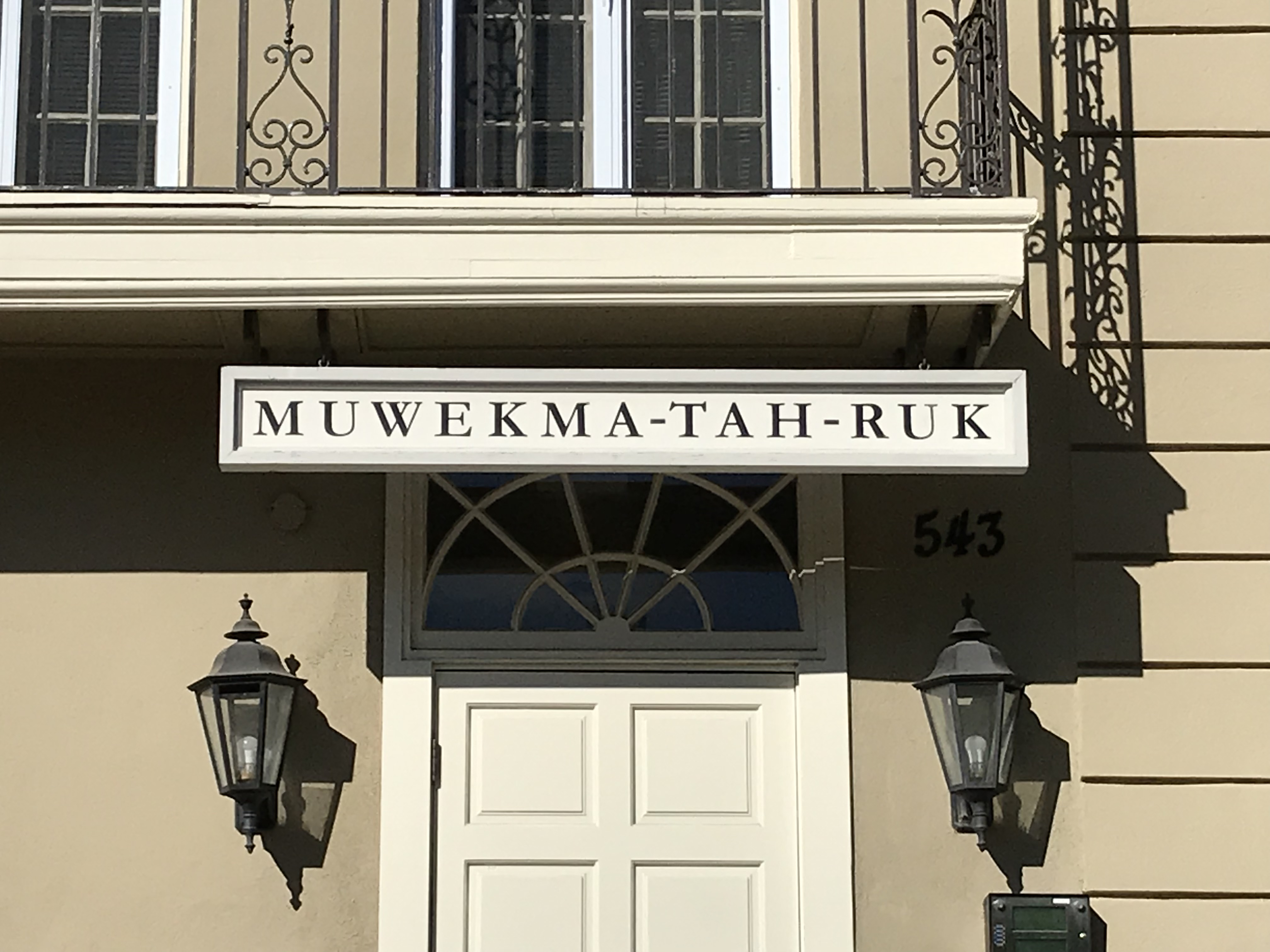
The Muwekma-Tah-Ruk theme house at Stanford University. Muwekma-Tah-Ruk means "house of the people" in Ohlone.

More recently, Callaghan (2014) groups Awaswas together with Mutsun as part of a South Central Costanoan subgroup with the Southern Costanoan branch.

== Dialect or language debate ==
Regarding the eight Ohlone branches, sources differ on if they were eight language dialects, or eight separate languages. Richard Levy, himself a linguist, contradicted himself on this point: First he said "Costanoans themselves were a set of tribelets [small tribes] who spoke a common language [...] distinguished from one another by slight differences in dialect"; however, after saying that, he concluded: "The eight branches of the Costanoan family were separate languages (not dialects) as different from one another as Spanish is from French". Randall Milliken stated in 1995 that there were eight dialects, citing missionary-linguist Felipe Arroyo de la Cuesta to the effect that the idioms seemed distinct as one traveled from mission to mission, but actually formed a dialect chain from one neighboring local tribe to another. Catherine Callaghan (1997, 2001), a linguist who steeped herself in the primary documents, offered evidence that the Costanoan languages were distinct, with only Ramaytush, Tamyen, and Chochenyo possibly being dialects of a single language. Milliken (2008), himself an ethnohistorian and not a linguist, shifted his position in 2008 to follow Callaghan, referring to separate Costanoan languages rather than dialects. Golla (2011) states that all Costanoan languages in the vicinity of San Francisco Bay, with the exception of Karkin, were mutually intelligible.

== Native placenames ==
The Ohlone native people belonged to one or more tribes, bands or villages, and to one or more of the eight linguistic group regions (as assigned by ethnolinguists). Native names listed in the mission records were, in some cases, clearly principal village names, in others the name assigned to the region of a "multifamily landholding group" (per Milliken). Although many native names have been written in historical records, the exact spelling and pronunciations were not entirely standardized in modern English. Ethnohistorians have resorted to approximating their indigenous regional boundaries as well. (The word that Kroeber coined to designate California tribes, bands and villages, tribelet, has been published in many records but is advisably offensive and incorrect, per the Ohlone people.)

Many of the known tribal and village names were recorded in the California mission records of baptism, marriage, and death. Some names have come from Spanish and Mexican settlers, some from early Anglo-European travelers, and some from the memories of Native American informants. Speakers were natives still alive who could remember their group's native language and details.

Some of the former tribe and village names were gleaned from the land maps ("diseños de terreno") submitted by grantees in applying for Spanish and Mexican land grants or designs ("diseños") that were drawn up in Alta California prior to the Mexican–American War. In this regard, large amounts of untranslated material is available for research in the records of Clinton H. Merriam housed at the Bancroft Library, and more material continues to be published by local historical societies and associations.

== Spelling and pronunciation ==
Many of the original sounds were first heard and copied down by Spanish missionaries using Spanish as a reference language, subject to human error, later translated into English and Anglicized over time. Spelling errors crept in as different missionaries kept separate records over a long period of time, under various administrators. Ethnohistorians Kroeber, Merriam, and others interviewed Ohlone speakers and were able to define some pronunciations on word lists. Ethnolinguists have used this to some advantage to create phonetic tables giving some semblance of languages, notably the Selected Costanoan Words by Merriam.

== Native words ==
A partial table of words comes from Indian Names for Plants and Animals Among California and other Western North American Tribes by Clinton Merriam. This published list covers 400 Ohlone words from interviews of native speakers. The Ohlone words listed are by "phonetic English" pronunciations.

Selected Costanoan Words by Merriam
English Word	Schedule #56	Schedule #57	Word #
Salmon	Oo'-rahk	Hoo"-rah-ka	247
Abalone	Oo==ch	Hah-shan	254
Redwood (Sequoia sempervirens)	–	Ho-o-pe	280
Valley Live Oak (Quercus agrifolia or Quercus lobata)	Yū'Ks	You-kish	296
Big Round Tule	Rōks	Ró-kus	409
Legend: Schedule # – record number of one more interviews, with one or more persons.; Word # – Merriam numbers his words for easy reference.
