= Kakonkaruk, California =

Former settlement in California

Kakonkaruk (also, Cakanaruk and Kakontaruk) is a former Rumsen settlement in Monterey County, California, United States. It was located in the Big Sur area; its precise location is unknown.
