= Santa Teresa, California =

Santa Teresa, California may refer to:

- Santa Teresa, San Jose, California, a neighborhood in southern San Jose, California, USA
- Santa Teresa, alternate name for Tukutnut, California
- Santa Teresa, a fictional version of Santa Barbara, California, in the "Alphabet" detective series by Sue Grafton
