= Achasta, California =

Achasta
- Former settlement
- Location in California
- Coordinates: 36°36′01″N 121°53′41″W
- Country: United States
- State: California
- County: Monterey
- Elevation: 85 ft (26 m)

Achasta (also, Achiesta) is a former Ohlone settlement in Monterey County, California, United States. It was located at the site of modern-day Monterey.

Achasta was historically a dwelling of the Rumsen people. Alternate historical spellings include Achastas, Achastli, Achastlian, Achastlien, Achastlier, Achastlies.
