= Tamien language =

Extinct indigenous language of California

Tamyen
- Santa Clara
- Native to: United States
- Region: California
- Ethnicity: Tamien people
- Extinct: (date missing)
- Language family: Yok-Utian: Utian; Ohlone; Northern; San Francisco Bay; Tamyen
- Writing system: Latin

Language codes
- ISO 639-3: (included in Northern Ohlone cst)
- Glottolog: sant1427
- ELP: San Francisco Bay Costanoan (shared)
- Map of Ohlone varieties with Tamien

- Geographic distribution of Tamien people and language

The Tamyen language (also spelled as Tamien, Thamien) is one of eight Ohlone languages, once spoken by Tamien people in Northern California.

Tamyen (also called Santa Clara Costanoan) has been extended to mean the Santa Clara Valley Indians, as well as for the language they spoke. Tamyen is listed as one of the Costanoan language dialects in the Utian family. It was the primary language that Natives spoke at the first and second Mission Santa Clara (both founded in 1777). Linguistically, it is thought that Chochenyo, Tamyen and Ramaytush were close dialects of a single language.

== See also ==
- Ohlone tribes and villages in Santa Clara Valley
- Tamien Station
- Tamien, San Jose
