= San Jose language =

San Jose language may refer to:

- Tamyen language (California)
- Guamo language (Venezuela)
