= Kalindaruk =

Kalindaruk may refer to:

- a subdivision of the Ohlone people
- Kalindaruk, California, a former settlement in Monterey County, California
