= Rumsen people =

Indigenous people of California, US

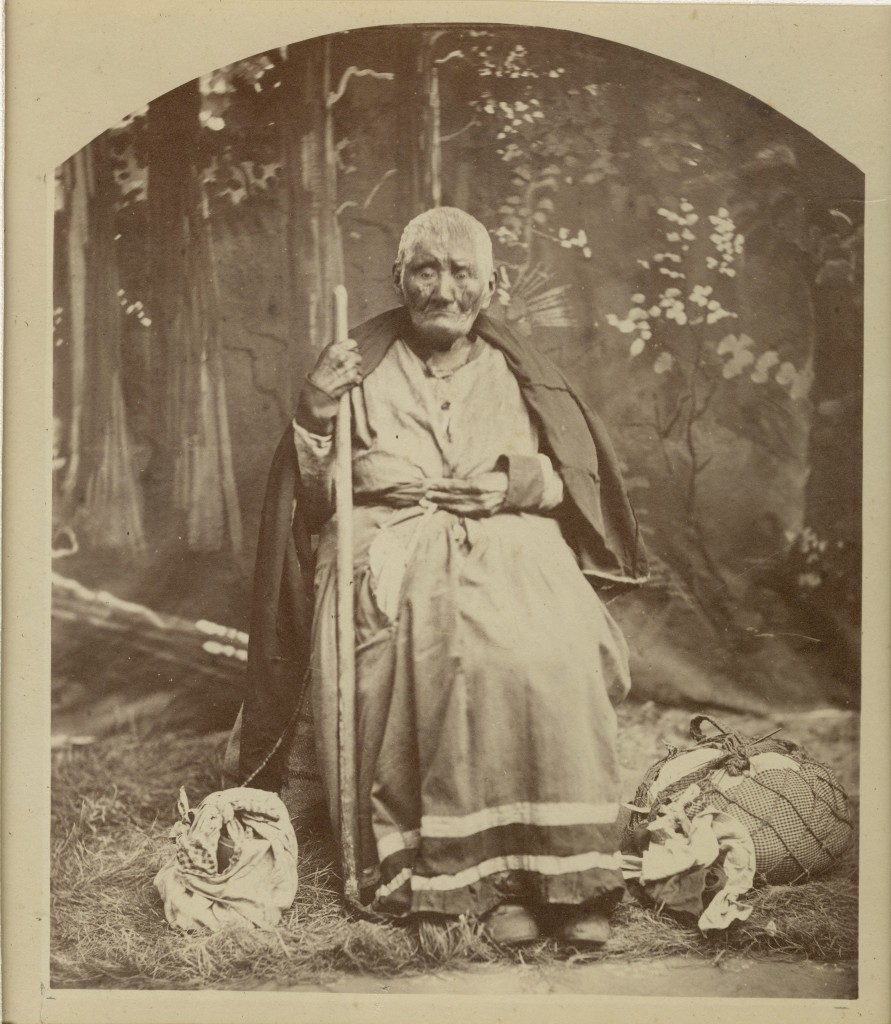
Omesia Teyoc, a Rumsen woman born and baptized at Mission San Carlos Borroméo de Carmelo

The Rumsen (also known as Rumsien, San Carlos Costanoan, and Carmeleno) are one of eight groups of the Ohlone, an Indigenous people of California. Their historical territory included coastal and inland areas within what is now Monterey County, California, including the Monterey Peninsula.

Like other Ohlone, Rumsen no longer have federal recognition but continue to sustain their culture and community presence in central California. This is despite the fact the Rumsen signed a treaty with the United States: the Treaty of Camp Belt, signed May 13, 1851. The treaty was then taken to Washington DC and hidden for 30 years while the US government attempted to learn if the land and water sources they "gave" to these tribes had gold in their streams or rivers.

== Territory ==
The Rumsen historically shared a common language, Rumsen, which was spoken from the Pajaro River to Point Sur, and on the lower courses of the Pajaro, as well as on the Salinas and Carmel Rivers, and the region of the present-day cities of Salinas, Monterey and Carmel Valley.

The Rumsen tribe held the lower Carmel River Valley and neighboring Monterey Peninsula at the time of Spanish colonization. Their population of approximately 400 to 500 people was distributed among at least five villages within their territory. An early 20th-century mapping of a specific village called Rumsen on the Carmel River, several miles inland from the Mission in Carmel, may or may not be accurate. Mission registers indicate that "Tucutnut", about three miles upstream from the mouth of the Carmel River, was the largest village of the Rumsen local tribe. The other four tribal villages include the Achista in Monterey, the Shokronta in Carmel Valley, the Echilat on the San Francisquito Flat, and Ishxenta along San Jose Creek.

== History ==
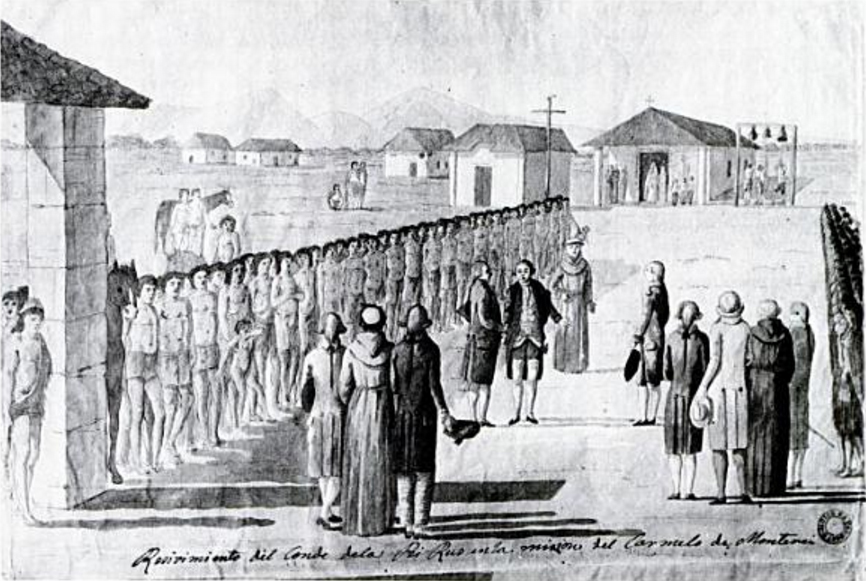
Rumsen individuals lined up at Mission San Carlos Borroméo de Carmelo

The Rumsen were the first Costanoan people to be seen and documented by the Spanish explorers of Northern California, as noted by Sebastian Vizcaíno when he reached Monterey in 1602. Since this first Spanish contact, Manila galleons may have occasionally ventured up the California coastline and stopped in Monterey Bay between 1602 and 1769.

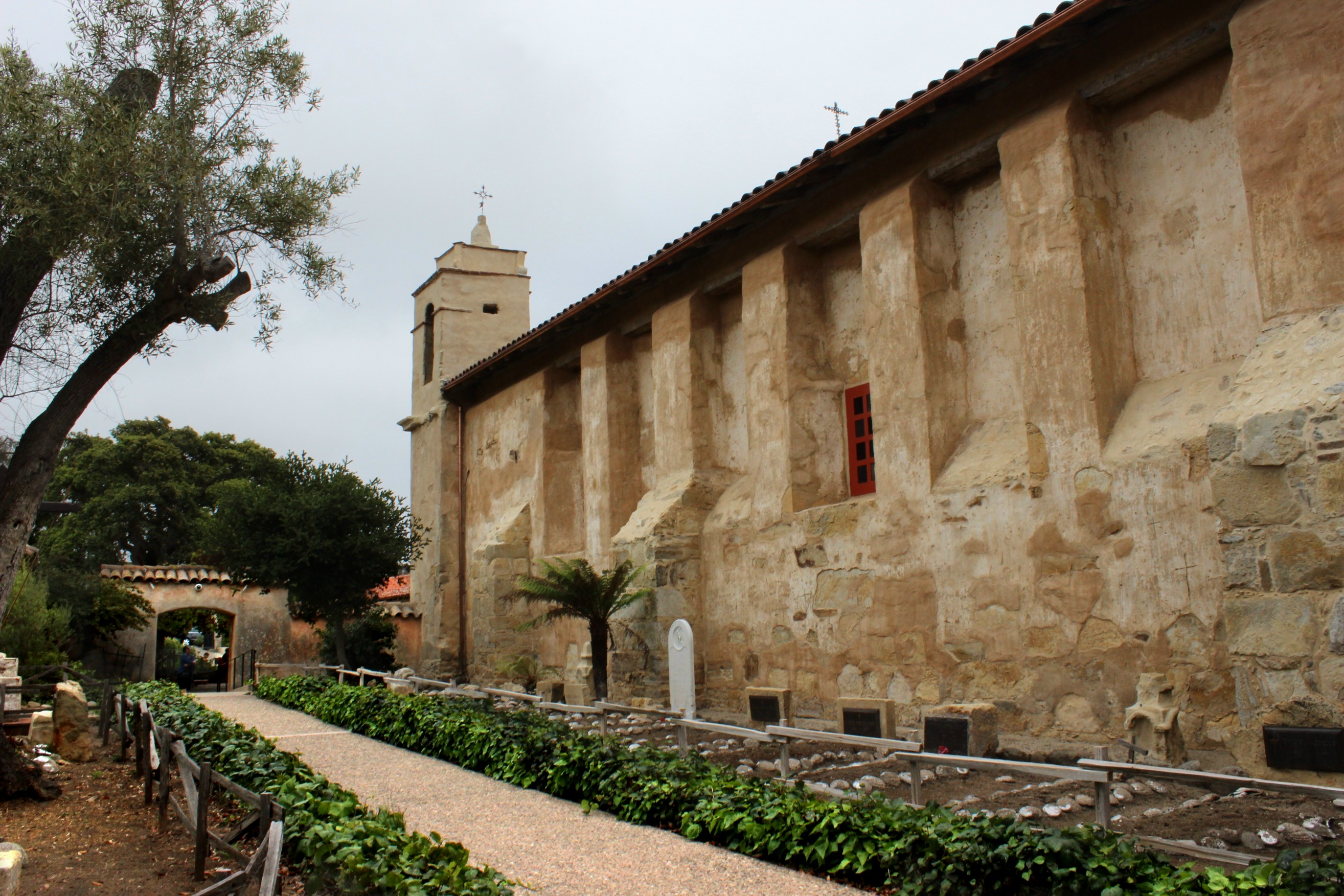
Graves of the Rumsen who died at Mission San Carlos Borroméo de Carmelo

During the era of Spanish missions in California, the Rumsen people's lives changed when the Spaniards came from the south to build the Mission San Carlos Borroméo de Carmelo and the Monterey Presidio in their territory. Many were baptized between 1771 and 1808. Once baptized, the Rumsen people were enslaved and forced to live in the mission village and its surrounding ranches. They were taught as Catholic neophytes, also known as Mission Indians, until the missions were secularized (discontinued) by the Mexican Government in 1834. Some Mission San Carlos Indian people were formally deeded plots upon secularization, only to have those plots stolen during the Rancho Period.

At least since the mission era, the people of the Esselen Nation claim close association with the Rumsen Ohlone, through Mission integration and intermarriage.

In 1925, Alfred Kroeber, then director of the Hearst Museum of Anthropology, declared the tribe extinct, which directly led to its losing federal recognition and land rights. Despite this declaration, the Rumsen Ohlone Tribal Community persists in the Monterey Bay area, preserving and revitalizing Rumsen Ohlone traditions.

== Rumsen folklore ==
Rumsen oral tradition tells the story of Caacakiy Maccan - or Coyote - an anthropomorphic trickster god. In one story, Coyote takes his wife to the ocean. He tells her that the sea creatures are her relatives, but does not tell her that the sea creature called Makkeweks is her uncle. Upon seeing Makkeweks, Coyote’s wife dies in fright, and Coyote performs a shamanic ritual to revive her. Another story tells of a rivalry between Coyote and Hummingbird, in which Hummingbird bests Coyote in a battle of wits.

== Rumsen-speaking tribes and heritage ==
Dialects of the Rumsen language were spoken by four independent local tribes, including the Rumsen themselves, the Ensen of the Salinas vicinity, the Calendaruc of the central shoreline of Monterey Bay, and the Sargentaruc of the Big Sur Coast. The territory of the language group was bordered by Monterey Bay and the Pacific Ocean to the west, the Awaswas Ohlone to the north, the Mutsun Ohlone to the east, the Chalon Ohlone on the southeast, and the Esselen to the south.

Linda Yamane is an Ohlone scholar and basket weaver who traces her heritage to the Rumsen Ohlone. She has spent more than 30 years researching and reviving Rumsen language, stories, songs, basketry, and other Ohlone cultural traditions.

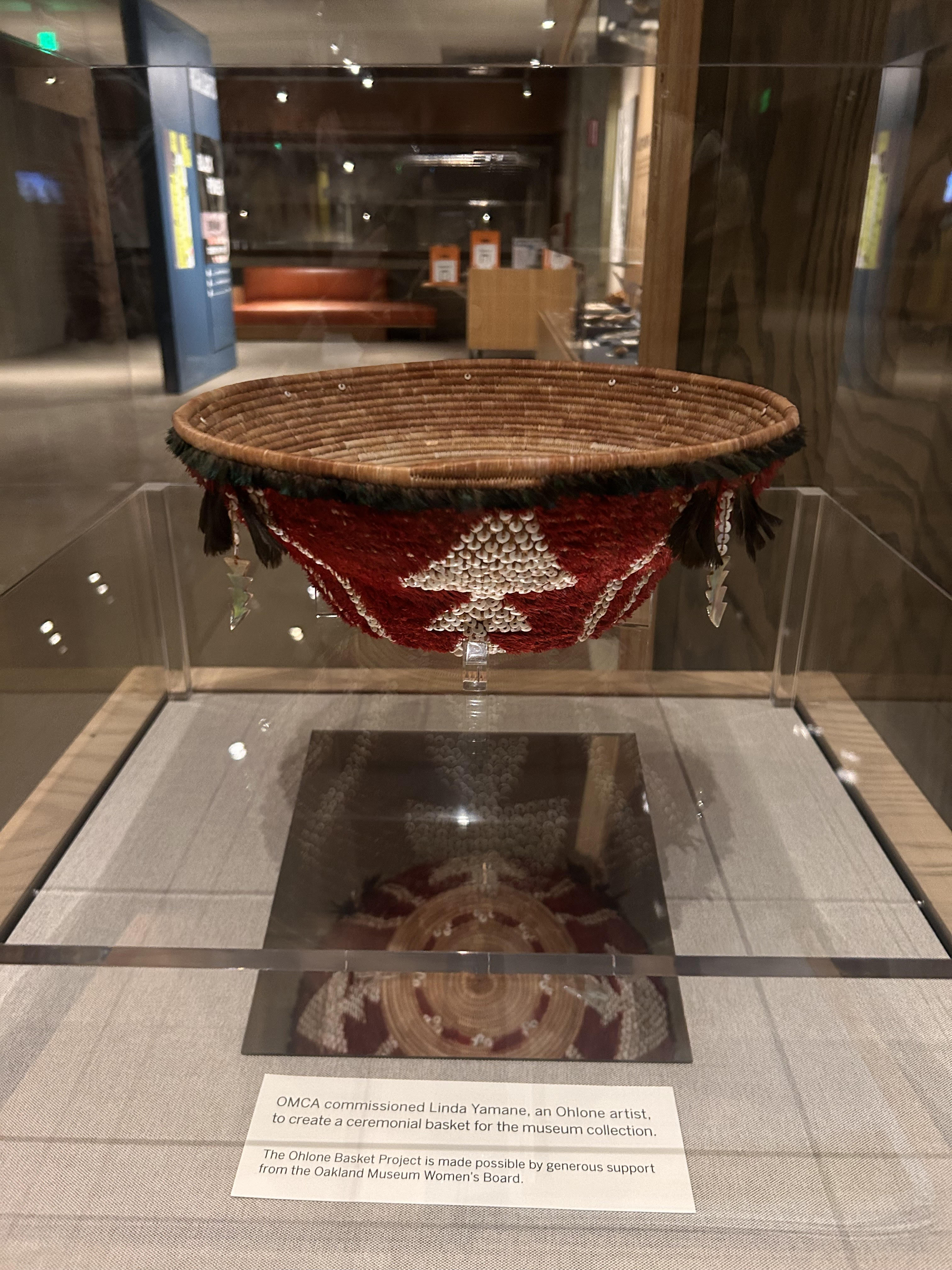
Photo of Rumsen Ohlone ceremonial basket weaved by Ohlone scholar and basket weaver Linda Yamane, commissioned by the Oakland Museum of California.

== See also ==
- Ohlone tribes and villages in the Monterey Bay Area
- Ohlone: History
