= Coyote Hills (Alameda County) =

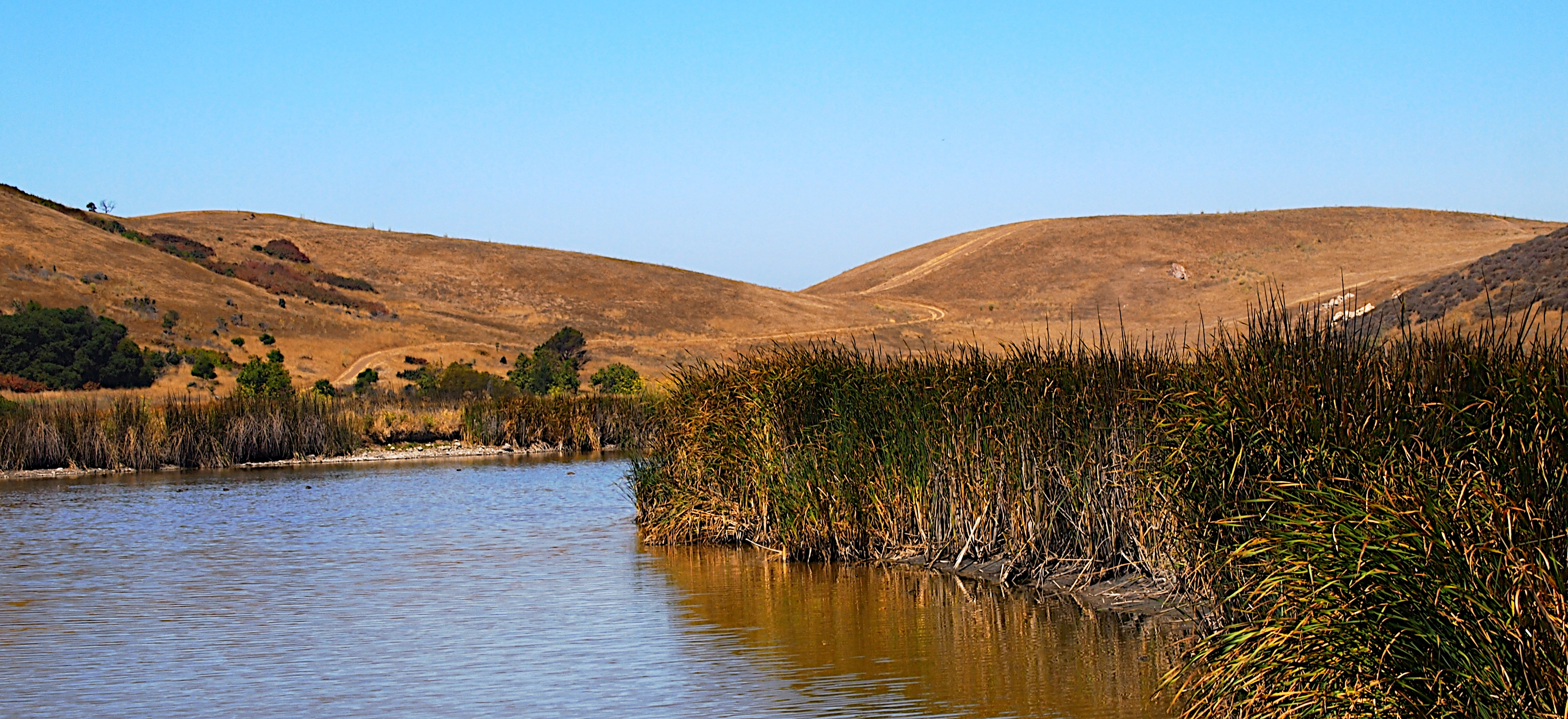

Highest point
- Elevation: 68 m (223 ft)

Geography
- Location within California
- Country: United States
- State: California
- District: Alameda County
- Range coordinates: 37°32′31.771″N 122°5′8.867″W
- Topo map: USGS Newark

The Coyote Hills, or Máyyan Šaatošikma in Chochenyo dialect, are a low mountain range in Alameda County, California.

The 1,266-acre Coyote Hills Regional Park is located in and named for these hills, additionally containing marshland.
