= Chalon language =

Extinct Ohlone language of California

Chalon
- Soledad
- Native to: United States
- Region: California
- Ethnicity: Chalon people
- Era: attested 19th century
- Language family: Yok-Utian: Utian; Ohlone; Northern; Chalon
- Writing system: Latin

Language codes
- ISO 639-3: (included in Northern Ohlone cst)
- Glottolog: chal1270

The Chalon language, also known as Soledad Costanoan, or just Soledad, is one of eight Ohlone (or Costanoan) languages of the Utian family. Though now sleeping, the language was historically spoken by the Chalon and Noptac people of Native Americans who lived in Northern California. These speakers were mainly settled in small tribes settled along the Chalone Creek, in the Gabilan Range east of the Salinas River and near Mission Soledad, though the total geographic extent of the language is largely disputed.

The only documentation of the language originates from the wordlists created by Horatio Hale, Alphonse Pinart, and Henry W Henshaw, as well as a fragment of Jesuit Bartolomé Castaño's Catecismo Breve (1644) as translated by Father Vicente Francisco de Sarría of the Franciscan mission all in the 19th century.

It is debated whether Chalon may be considered northern, southern, or transitional between the two groups of Ohlone languages, and only began to be considered an independent language rather than a dialect after Richard Levy proposed it in 1978.

== Phonology ==
Chalon words can be both monosyllabic and polysyllabic, with the longest recorded word being six syllables.

=== Consonants - North American Phonetic Alphabet (NAPA) ===
	Bilabial	Labio-Dental	Alveolar	Postalveolar	Palatal	Velar	Glottal
Stop	p		t			k	
Nasal	m		n				
Fricative		v	s	š			h
Affricates			ts	č			
Approximant	w		r		y		
Lateral-Approximant			l				

The consonants /b, d, g/ appear infrequently in language data, and are speculated to be allophones of /p, t, k/. Likewise, /h/ and /x/ are also speculated to be allophones in complementary distribution.

=== Vowels ===
	Front	Central	back
Close	i		u
Mid	e		o
Open	a		

It has been marked that Chalon vowels can be elongated with at least one minimal pair, and there are three known diphthongs (a͜i, o͜ʊ and o͜i ). Lax vowels /ɪ, ɛ, ʊ, ɔ/ in the language data are speculated to be allophones of /i, e, u, o/.

== Grammar ==
Shaul has identified several independent pronouns, as well as a determiner ik, which he notes may be unique to the Chalon language.

=== Noun & Verb Morphology ===
- Third person prefix i- on both nouns and verbs
- Objective case suffix -s or -se on some nouns
- Plural suffix -mak on some nouns
- Instrumental case suffix -sum on some nouns
- Comitative case suffix -me on some nouns
- Tense suffix -s marking both past and future on verbs
- Reflexive suffix -pi on some verbs
- Benefactive case suffix -mi on some verbs
- Nominalizer suffix -(k)men on some verbs
- Additional evidence of locative case affixes on nouns
