= Chalon people =

Population in California, USA

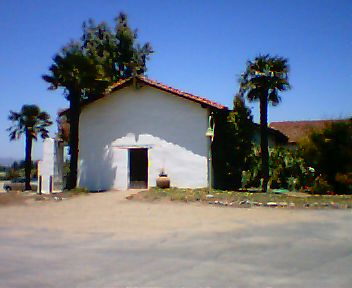
Mission Nuestra Señora de la Soledad

The Chalon people are one of eight divisions of the Ohlone (Costanoan) people of Native Americans who lived in Northern California. Chalon (also called Soledad) is also the name of their spoken language, which is listed as one of the Ohlone (alias Costanoan) languages of the Utian family. Recent work suggests that Chalon may be transitional between the northern and southern groups of Ohlone languages.

The original Chalon homeland area is the subject of some local controversy. Initial studies in the early twentieth century placed them in the portion of the Salinas Valley that surrounds the modern town of Soledad, as well as in the adjacent lower Arroyo Seco area to the west and Chalon Creek are to the east. In contrast, a late twentieth century study gives the Spanish-contact period Chalon people the rugged Coast Range valleys centered farther to the east, including upper Chalon Creek, the San Benito River east of the Salinas Valley, and the small creeks around San Benito Mountain. The latter study assigns most of that Salinas Valley area to the Eslenajan local tribe of Esselen speakers.

While not much is known about the Chalon people specifically, certain characteristics are shared by the Californian tribes. This includes their diet which consisted of local wildlife such as deer and plants and nuts like acorns. Chalon territory was bordered by the Mutsun (another Ohone division) to the east, Rumsen (another Ohlone division) to the north, Esselen in the Salinas Valley to the west, Salinan to the south, and Yokuts in the San Joaquin Valley to the east.

== Spanish missionaries ==
During the era of Spanish missions in California, the Chalon people's lives changed with the founding of Mission Nuestra Señora de la Soledad in 1791. Most Chalon speakers were forced into the mission between 1795 and 1814, where they were baptized, lived and educated to be Catholic neophytes, also known as Mission Indians. Many Mission Indians would attempt to stay in touch with their original tribe and would maintain a dual identity. At Mission Soledad many Chalon married local Esselen speakers, while others married Yokuts who were brought into the mission between 1806 and 1834. The Soledad mission was discontinued by the Mexican Government in 1835 during the period of secularization, at which time the survivors scattered. Most went to work on the farms and ranches of west-central California, while many with Yokuts ancestry moved east into the San Joaquin Valley.

== Chalon mobile bands and villages ==
The term Chalon was documented by the Franciscan priests in their Mission Soledad ecclesiastical records. The term definitely applied to a region, since individuals were baptized from specific villages such as "Ponojo del Chalon" and "Zusotica del Chalon." Anthropologist A.L. Kroeber, who first mapped the Chalon language area, presumed that it entirely surrounded Mission Nuestra Señora de la Soledad on the Salinas River; he mapped the specific village of Wacharo-n adjacent to the mission itself. A recent alternative analysis places the Eslenajan local tribe of Esselen language speakers as the inhabitants of the Soledad vicinity at the founding of the mission, places the Guachirron local tribe as Rumsen speakers farther north near Monterey Bay, and places the villages of Chalon to the east of the Salinas Valley.

== Chalon clothing and culture ==
The relationships between the Spanish missionaries and the Chalon people could be described and measured by the giving and receiving of gifts and especially clothing. During the early encounters between the two groups, the Chalon people would gladly accept gifts of cloth and could even be enticed into joining the missionaries communities for these gifts. Later on the Chalon people would start to refuse these gifts as they spent more time with them and started to die of disease. The natives would demonstrate their feelings towards the missionaries by accepting or avidly refusing these gifts.

== Westward expansion ==
The initial population of Native Americans in the early 1800s was estimated to be around 300,000. When more colonists and missionaries began populating the area, the natives were exposed to many new factors. This included colonists who were looking for gold across the state and trading food, furs, and other items. As a result, many natives had contracted new diseases or became vulnerable to other factors. This had a heavy effect on the native population and an estimated 20,000 people remained by the late 1800s. This also had a great effect on the loss of language, as many of the Chalon languages were intelligible to each other.
