= Tiubta, California =

Human settlement in Monterey County, California, United States of America

Tiubta is a former Kalindaruk (Costanoan) settlement in Monterey County, California, United States.

Its precise location is unknown.
