= Lamchin =

Extinct native American tribe from California

The Lamchin were one of many tribes of the Ohlone (Coastanoan) people, Native Americans who lived along the San Francisco Peninsula. The Lamchin were the native inhabitants of what is now San Carlos, California. Information is sparse and dispersed, coming mostly from Spanish mission records – as the natives had no written language. The collected information follows over 100 years of research by many noted historians. The Lamchin are believed to be extinct – as historical, statistical and limited written accounts would seem to indicate.

Their north-western neighbors were the Ssalson, to the south the Suchihín, and to the east the Puichon, respectively in present-day Belmont, California, the southern end of Crystal Springs Reservoir, and Redwood City, California. All the groups are considered part of the Ohlone (or Costanoan) language group. The Ohlone group language has been labeled Utian.

The Lamchin may have had two villages named Ormostac, close to the Ssalson and Cachanigtac, their main village in what is now directly south of the downtown San Carlos along Pulgas Creek. The main village name appears to contain a word for vermin, which the Spanish missionaries translated as las Pulgas (the Fleas). The names still lives on as Alameda de las Pulgas, a local main thoroughfare connecting peninsula towns along the feet of the foothills. The mission's baptismal record mentions other Lamchin villages of Ussete, Guloisnistac, and Ssupichom.

The first native inhabitants were baptized at Mission San Francisco de Asís (Mission Dolores) in 1777 and last in 1794. A total of 139 Lamchin people appear in the mission's baptismal records.

== Differences in spelling ==
It bears repeating that the Spanish mission records are fuzzy and sparse. Spelling differs on many entries for the same word, as the missionaries were trying to write with reference to their native language. We, in turn, re-write to our phonetic references and language. As such, authorities on this subject differ in spelling.

Currently only Milliken (1995) and Brown (1973) cover Lamchin material sufficiently for reference. The table below gives a few of the (currently) known spellings, with Milliken getting preference.

Milliken (1995)	Brown (1973)
Lamchin	Lamshín
Ormostac	Wuloisnístac
Cachanigtac	Cachaníhtac
