= Tukutnut, California =

Tukutnut (also, Santa Teresa and Tucutnut) is a former Rumsen settlement in Monterey County, California, United States.

According to mission records, the village was located about 3 miles (4.8 km) upstream from the mouth of the Carmel River, and it was the largest village of the Rumsen group of Costanoans.
