= Bean Hollow State Beach =

State park in California, United States

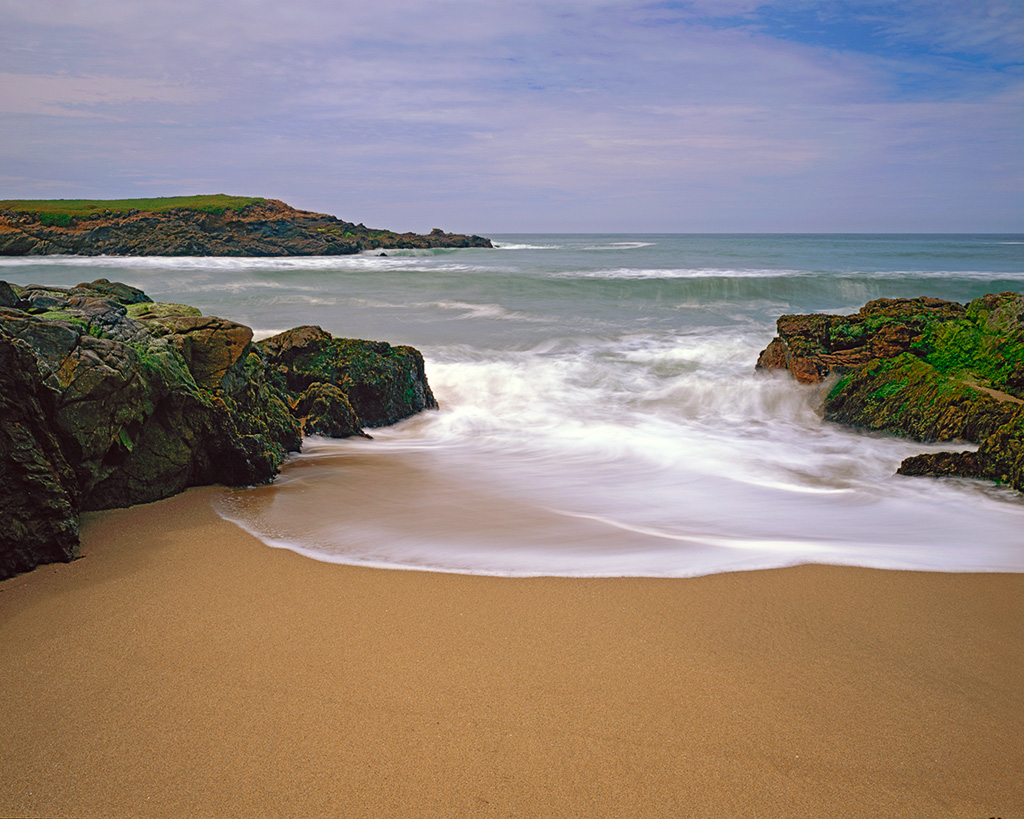

- Location within California Location within the United States
- Location: San Mateo County, California, United States
- Nearest city: Pescadero, California
- Coordinates: 37°13′33″N 122°24′32″W
- Area: 44 acres (18 ha)
- Established: 1958
- Governing body: California Department of Parks and Recreation

Bean Hollow State Beach is a beach in the state park system of California, United States. It is located in San Mateo County near Pescadero. It encompasses a one-mile stretch of shoreline with two main parking lots, the northernmost providing access to the Pebble Beach area of the State Beach. The two beaches are connected by the mile-long Arroyo de los Frijoles Trail. The beach offers fishing, picnicking and beachcombing and exploring the tide pools. The beach also has a self-guided nature trail. Swimming is dangerous because of cold water, rip currents, heavy surf and sharks. Bean Hollow is 17.5 miles (28.2 km) south of Half Moon Bay and 3 miles (4.8 km) south of Pescadero on State Route 1. The 44-acre (18 ha) property was acquired by the state in 1958. Bean Hollow has become one of the premier locations in California for 1/10 scale radio control 4 wheel drive trucks.

== Name ==
Named after Cañada del Frijol which was applied in the 1840s. The English term was in use by 1861.

== History ==
The earliest recording of the area was from the Portolá Expedition of 1769 who were retreating back to San Diego along an Ohlone road. "...we made camp close to one of two large streams in the San Pedro Regalado hollow, where there is a good-size lake, a great deal of wood, and grand grass." - Return Journal of Fray Juan Crespí, Saturday November 18. Once in Ohlone country, the Expedition found the native people to be most gracious, offering food and guidance. The Quiroste’s home territory encompassed roughly 90 square miles and stretched from the sea to ridge-tops in the mountains to the east. They were hunters and gatherers who knew how to manage their land’s resources so that the plants upon which they relied would proliferate. Quiriste Valley contains at least 13 documented and undocumented archaeological sites. Initial research shows they occupied the area at least a thousand years.

== Ecology ==
The beach has both a sandy beach area and a vast array of rocky tide pools all along its coastline. There is a nearby harbor seal rookery. The mile-long nature trail touts ice plants, lizard's tail, coyote bush, blackberry, and wildflowers. The bluffs feature orange sandstone cliffs with tafoni formations leading all around into the tide pools. The area of Pebble Beach features stones from an offshore gravel bed dating from the Pleistocene era, including moonstone, jade, chert, agate, and jasper, none of which are allowed for collection. Visitors can explore tide pools with anemones, crabs, sea urchins, starfish, and other marine inhabitants.

== See also ==
- List of California state parks
- List of California State Beaches
