= Kalindaruk, California =

Former Native American settlement in the US

Kalindaruk (also, Calendaruc, Kathlendaruc, and Katlendarukas) is a former Ohlone Native American settlement in Monterey County, California, United States. Its precise location is unknown.

== See also ==
- Population of Native California
- Native American history of California
