= Catherine Callaghan (linguist) =

American linguist (1931–2019)

- Callaghan in 2015
- Born: October 31, 1931
- Died: March 16, 2019 (aged 87)
- Occupation: Linguist

Academic background
- Education: University of California, Berkeley (1963)
- Doctoral advisor: Mary Haas

Academic work
- Main interests: Penutian languages, Utian languages

Catherine A. Callaghan (October 31, 1931 – March 16, 2019) was an American linguist who spent much of her academic life as a professor at the Ohio State University.

She received a Ph.D. in linguistics from the University of California, Berkeley in 1963. Her doctoral dissertation was a grammar of Lake Miwok, written under the supervision of Mary Haas. She then started work on the Lake Miwok Dictionary, which was published in 1965. She was appointed Assistant Professor of Linguistics at the Ohio State University in 1965 and remained there until her retirement. She was named a Fellow of the American Association for the Advancement of Science in 1969.

Throughout her career, Callaghan's research focused on the Penutian languages of California, especially connections between Yokuts and Miwok. She appeared briefly in the documentary, How Dead do I Look?, which was filmed in 2014. Her papers on Miwok Languages are collected at the California Language Archive.

In 1973, Callaghan co-founded Feminists for Life, an anti-abortion feminist non-profit.

Callaghan died on March 16, 2019, in Columbus, Ohio.

== Key publications ==
- Callaghan, Catherine A. 1965. Lake Miwok Dictionary. University of California Press.
- Callaghan, Catherine A. 1970. Bodega Miwok Dictionary. Publications in Linguistics 60. University of California Press.
- Callaghan, Catherine A. 1984. Plains Miwok Dictionary. Publications in Linguistics 105. University of California Press.
- Callaghan, Catherine A. 1987. Northern Sierra Miwok Dictionary. Publications in Linguistics 110. University of California Press.
- Callaghan, Catherine A. 2012. Proto-Utian Grammar and Dictionary with notes on Yokuts. Trends in Linguistics Documentation 31. Berlin: De Gruyter Mouton.
