= Felipe Arroyo de la Cuesta =

Spanish Franciscan missionary and linguist

Felipe Arroyo de la Cuesta (1780–1842) was a Spanish Franciscan missionary and linguist notable for his work on native languages.

Arroyo de la Cuesta was born in Cubo de Bureba, Burgos, Spain in 1780. He arrived in the Spanish territory of Alta California in 1808 and worked at the Mission San Juan Bautista in California from 1808 to 1833. He studied and wrote numerous works on the languages of the region including Costanoan, Mutsun, and Yokuts.

In 1833, Arroyo de la Cuesta handed the work of San Juan Bautista over to Zacatean Franciscans. He then worked in a number of other Central California missions including San Luis Obispo, San Miguel, La Purísima, and Santa Inés. During the last years of his life he studied a variance of the language Chumash that is native to Saint Inés. He died in Santa Inés on 20 September 1842.
