= Tamien, San Jose =

Neighborhood of San Jose in Santa Clara, California, United States

Tamien
- Neighborhood of San Jose
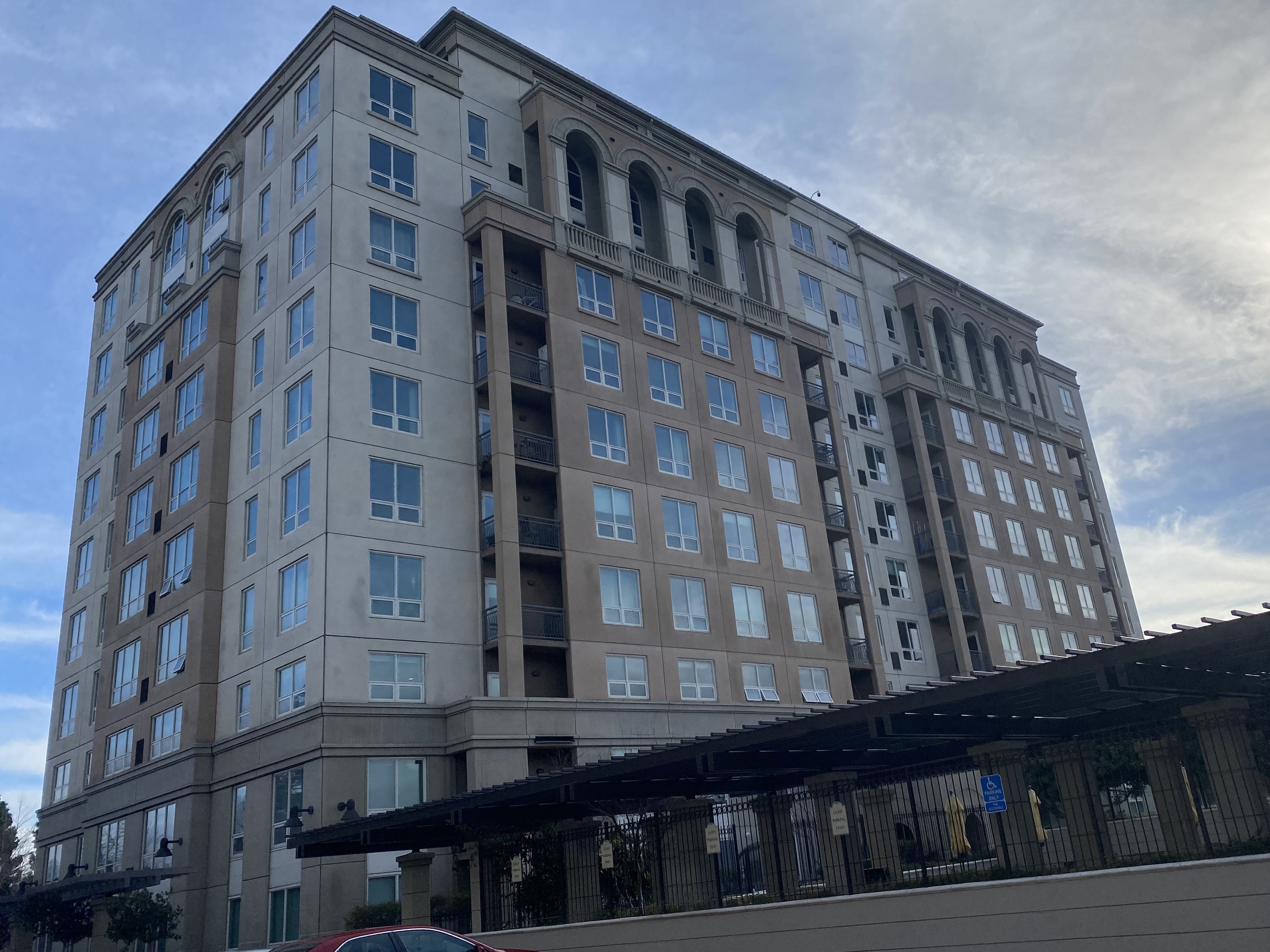
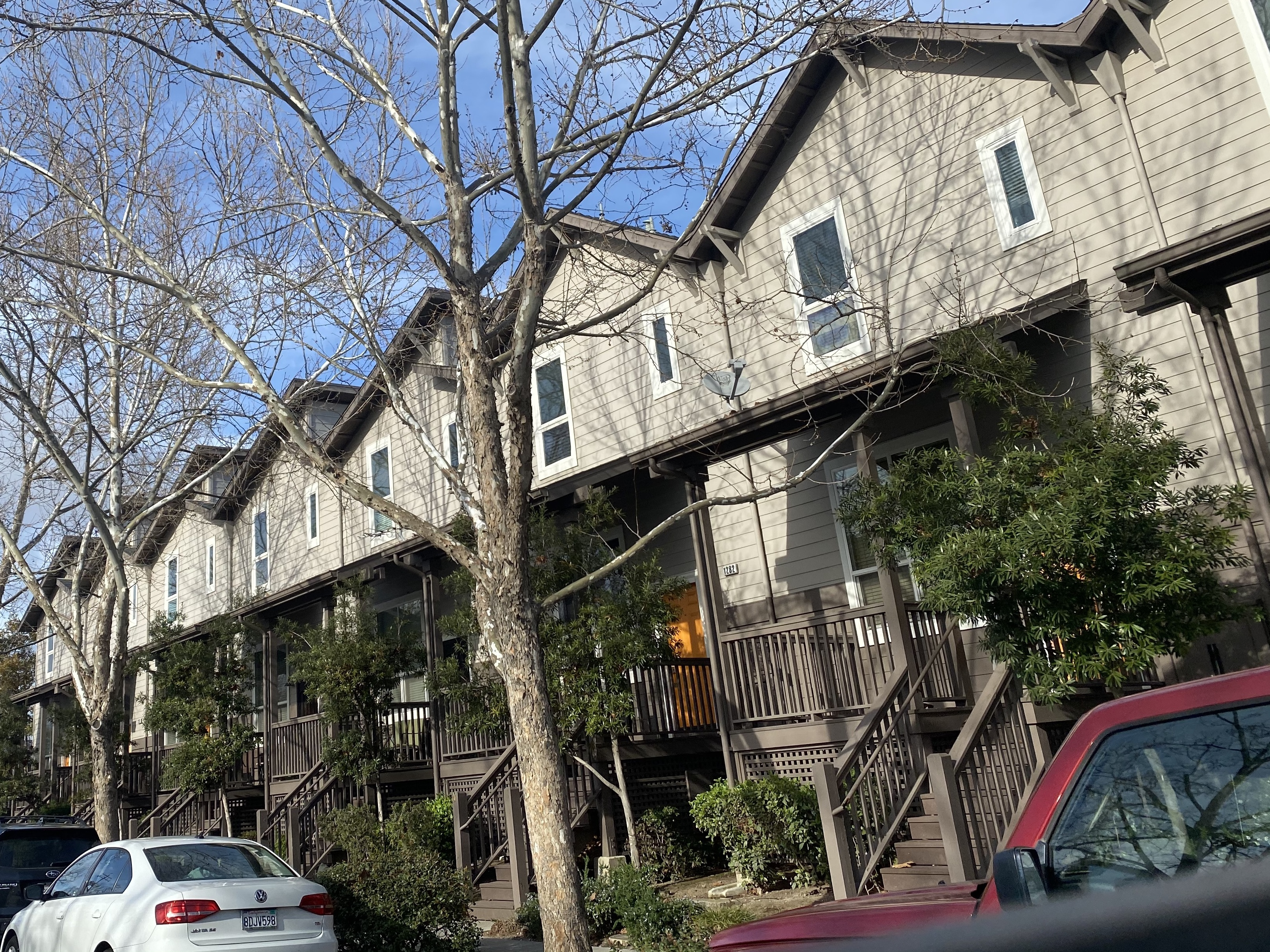
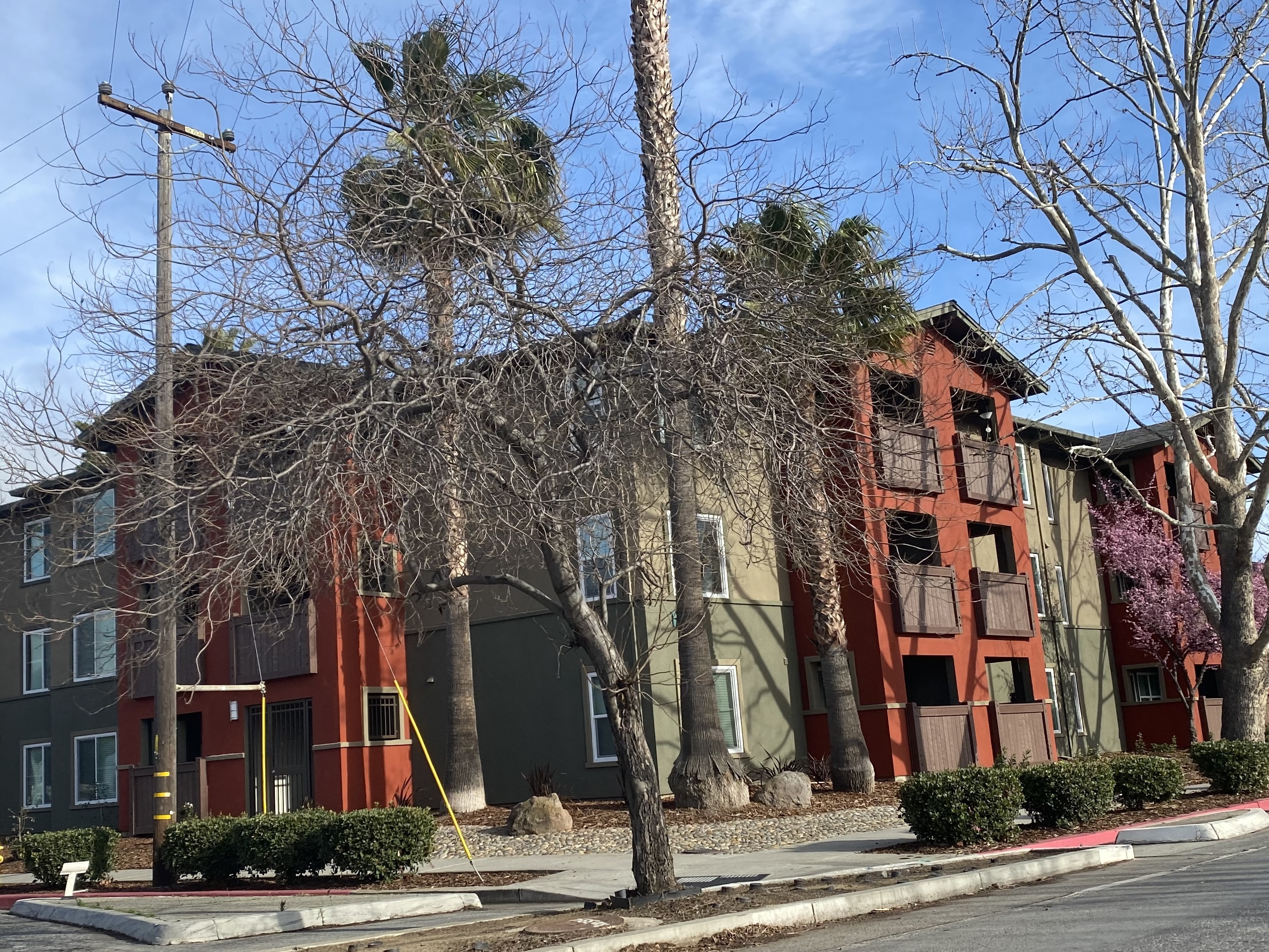

- Location within San Jose
- Coordinates: 37.312171°N 121.882585°W
- Country: United States
- State: California
- City: San Jose

Tamien is a neighborhood of central San Jose, California. The neighborhood is centered around Tamien station.

== History ==
The neighborhood and its station are named after the Tamien people of the Ohlone nation, the indigenous inhabitants of San Jose and the Santa Clara Valley.

== Geography ==
Tamien is immediately south of Washington-Guadalupe. The Guadalupe Freeway (CA-87) cuts through the neighborhood.

Since the onset of the California housing crisis, the neighborhood has been earmarked by city and transit authorities for a mixed-used transit-oriented development around Tamien Station.

== Transportation ==
Tamien station is served by:

- VTA light rail, on the Blue Line (VTA)
- VTA bus routes 25 and 56
- Caltrain (Local, Limited, & Caltrain Baby Bullet)

== Parks and plazas ==
- Tamien Park
