= Yelamu =

Ohlone tribe living in what is now San Francisco, California

Map of Yelamu villages

The Yelamu were a local tribe of Ohlone people from the San Francisco Bay Area in Northern California. The Yelamu spoke a language called Ramaytush. The modern Association of Ramaytush Ohlone (ARO) are the descendants of the Ramaytush.

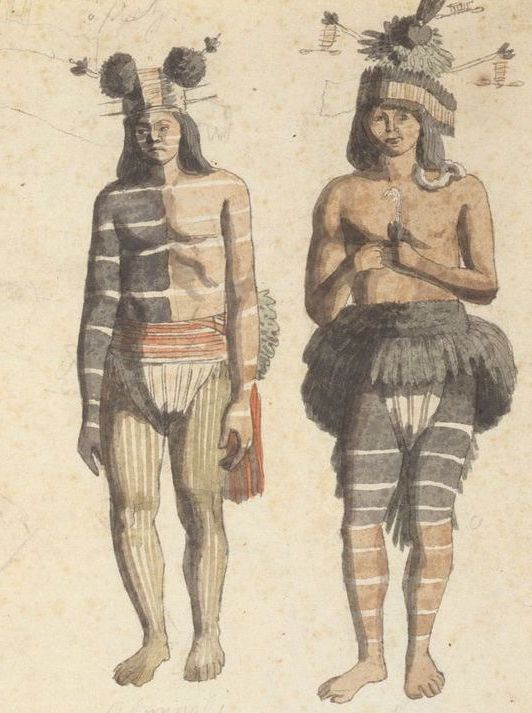
Watercolor by Louis Choris of two Ohlone men living near Mission Dolores

Randall Milliken's study, "A Time of Little Choice: The Disintegration of Tribal Culture in the San Francisco Bay Area 1769-1810", estimates that 160 to 300 Yelamu were living in San Francisco when the Spanish established Mission San Francisco de Asís on June 30, 1776.

Artifacts have been found across San Francisco from at least 50 different locations during modern construction activities within the city that were originally left by family groups that moved seasonally between villages around present day San Francisco. Additional villages existed to the south of San Francisco as well.

== History ==
According to anthropologists, the Yelamu people and their Ohlone neighbors arrived in the San Francisco area between 4,000 and 6,000 years ago. They lived on the northern tip of the San Francisco Peninsula in the region comprising the City and County of San Francisco before the arrival of Spanish missionaries in 1769.

The first four Yelamu people who converted to Christianity were baptized by Father Palou and Father Santa Maria between 1777 and 1779. They were absorbed into the Mission San Francisco de Asís that was founded in 1776 by the Spaniards, and became some of the first "Mission Indians" in the San Francisco area.

== Villages ==
The largest of the three San Francisco groups had its winter village at Tubsinthe, near Candlestick Point and its summer home at Amuctac in Visitacion Valley. The second group moved between their summer camp at Chutchui village located along Mission Creek in the Mission and Sitlintac on the edge of Mission Bay that was filled in during the 19th century. The third community lived near Crissy Field at Petlenuc. The Yelamu/Ramai villages south of San Francisco:

- Ompuromo - Southwest of Lake Merced
- Timigtac - Near present day Pacifica
- Pruristic - Present day Pacifica
- Siplichiquin - southeast foot of San Bruno Mountain
- Urebure - Present day San Bruno
