= Utian languages =

Language family of Northern California, US

Utian
- Miwok–Costanoan, Miwok–Ohlone, Mutsun
- Geographic distribution: California
- Linguistic classification: Yok-Utian ?: Utian
- Subdivisions: Miwok; Ohlone †

Language codes
- Glottolog: miwo1274
- Pre-contact distribution of Utian languages

Utian (also Miwok–Costanoan, Miwok–Ohlone or formerly Mutsun) is a family of Indigenous languages spoken in Northern California, United States. The Miwok and Ohlone peoples both spoke languages of the Utian language family. It has been argued that the Utian languages and Yokuts languages are sub-families of the Yok-Utian language family. Utian and Yokutsan have traditionally been considered part of the Penutian language phylum.

All Utian languages are severely endangered, extinct or revitalizing.

== Languages ==
The Miwok classification below is based on Mithun (1999), while the Ohlone classification below is based primarily on Callaghan (2001). Other classifications of Ohlone list Northern Costanoan, Southern Costanoan, and Karkin as single languages, with the following subgroups of each considered as dialects:

- Utian languages
  - Miwok
    - Eastern Miwok
      - †Plains Miwok
      - †Bay Miwok (a.k.a. Saclan)
      - Sierra Miwok
        - †Northern Sierra Miwok (Camanche, Fiddletown, Ione, and West Point dialects)
        - Central Sierra Miwok (nearly extinct) (East Central and West Central dialects)
        - Southern Sierra Miwok (nearly extinct) (Yosemite, Mariposa, and Southern dialects)
    - †Western Miwok
      - Coast Miwok (Bodega and Marin dialects)
      - Lake Miwok
  - †Ohlone
    - Karkin (also known as Carquin)
    - Northern Costanoan
      - San Francisco Bay Costanoan
        - Tamyen (also known as Tamien, Santa Clara Costanoan)
        - Chochenyo (also known as Chocheño, Chocheno, East Bay Costanoan)
        - Ramaytush (also known as San Francisco Costanoan)
      - Awaswas (also known as Santa Cruz Costanoan) – There may have been more than one Costanoan language spoken within the proposed Awaswas area, as the small amount of linguistic material attributed to Mission Santa Cruz Costanoans is highly variable.
      - Chalon (also known as Cholon, Soledad) – Chalon may be a transitional language between Northern and Southern Costanoan.
    - Southern Costanoan
      - Mutsun (also known as San Juan Bautista Costanoan)
      - Rumsen (also known as Rumsien, San Carlos, Carmel)

== See also ==
- Penutian languages
- Miwok languages
- Ohlone languages
