= Chochenyo dialect =

Language of the Chochenyo Ohlone people

Chochenyo
- Čočeño, East Bay
- lisiánish
- Native to: United States
- Region: California
- Ethnicity: Chochenyo people
- Extinct: 1934, with the death of José Guzmán
- Revival: from 2002
- Language family: Yok-Utian: Utian; Ohlone; Northern; San Francisco Bay; Chochenyo
- Writing system: Latin

Language codes
- ISO 639-3: (included in cst [cst])
- Glottolog: east2548
- ELP: San Francisco Bay Costanoan (shared)
- Map of Chochenyo varieties

Chochenyo (also called Chocheño, Northern Ohlone and East Bay Costanoan) is the spoken language of the Chochenyo people. Chochenyo is one of the Ohlone languages in the Utian family.

== Description and history ==
Linguistically, Chochenyo, Tamyen and Ramaytush are thought to have been dialects of a single language, but Tamyen and Ramaytush are very poorly attested. The speech of the last two native speakers of Chochenyo was documented in the 1920s in the unpublished fieldnotes of the Bureau of American Ethnology linguist John Peabody Harrington. The final native speaker of the language was José Guzmán who died in 1934 in Niles, California.

Vincent Medina presents in Chochenyo at the San Francisco Public Library.

The Muwekma Ohlone Tribe, which (as of 2007) is petitioning for U.S. federal recognition, has made efforts to revive the language. As of 2004, "the Chochenyo database being developed by the tribe ... [contained] from 1,000 to 2,000 basic words." By 2009, many students were able to carry on conversations in the Chochenyo language. Through both successful word formation, as well as extending documented words, the Chochenyo dictionary has grown significantly throughout the early 21st century. During the canonization of Saint Junípero Serra on September 23, 2015, the first reading at Mass was read in Chochenyo by Vincent Medina.

== Phonology ==
Consonants
	Labial	Dental/ alveolar		Retroflex	Palatal	Velar	Glottal
	Labial	hard	soft	Retroflex	Palatal	Velar	Glottal
Nasal	m ⟨m⟩	n ⟨n⟩	nʲ ⟨nY⟩				
Plosive	p ⟨p⟩	t ⟨t⟩		ʈ ⟨ṭ⟩		k ⟨k⟩	ʔ ⟨'⟩
Affricate		ts ⟨ts⟩			tʃ ⟨č⟩		
Fricative		s ⟨s⟩			ʃ ⟨š⟩	x ⟨x⟩	h ⟨h⟩
Approximant	w ⟨w⟩	l ⟨l⟩			j ⟨y⟩		
Flap		ɾ ⟨r⟩					

Vowels
	Front	Back
Close	i	u
Close-mid		o
Open-mid	ɛ	
Open		ɑ

The vowels can be long or short. Prolongation is shown by repeating the vowel.

- oo is pronounced /oː/, not /uː/
