= Mutsun language =

Extinct Utian language

Mutsun
- San Juan Bautista
- Native to: United States
- Region: California
- Ethnicity: Mutsun Ohlone
- Extinct: 1930, with the death of Ascencion Solórzano de Cervantes
- Revival: early 2000s
- Language family: Yok-Utian: Utian; Ohlone; Southern; Mutsun
- Writing system: Latin

Language codes
- ISO 639-3: (included in Southern Ohlone css)
- Glottolog: muts1243
- Map of Ohlone varieties with Mutsun

Mutsun (also known as San Juan Bautista Costanoan) is a Utian language spoken in Northern California. It was the primary language of a division of the Ohlone people living in the Mission San Juan Bautista area. It initially went extinct in 1930 when the last speaker died, Ascencion Solórzano de Cervantes. The Tamien Nation and Amah Mutsun band is currently working to restore the use of the language, using a modern alphabet.

== Studies of the language ==
Maria Ascención Solórsano de Garcia y de Cervantes, the last known fluent speaker of Mutsun, amassed large amounts of language and cultural data specific to the Mutsun. The Spanish Franciscan missionary and linguist Felipe Arroyo de la Cuesta wrote extensively about the language's grammar, and linguist John Peabody Harrington made very extensive notes on the language from Solórsano. Harrington's field notes formed the basis of the grammar of Mutsun written by Marc Okrand as a University of California dissertation in 1977 which to this day remains the only grammar ever written of any Costanoan language. Scholars from the U.S., Germany, and the Netherlands have discussed methods that could facilitate the revitalization of Mutsun.

== Phonology ==
Vowel and consonant phonemes are represented here with the descriptions and orthography of the English–Mutsun dictionary, with additions from an earlier paper by Warner, Butler, and Luna-Costillas.

=== Vowels ===
	Front		Back	
Close	i ⟨i⟩	iː ⟨ii⟩	u ⟨u⟩	uː ⟨uu⟩
Mid	ɛ ⟨e⟩	ɛː ⟨ee⟩	o ⟨o⟩	oː ⟨oo⟩
Open			ɑ ⟨a⟩	ɑː ⟨aa⟩

- /ɛ/ is open-mid, whereas /o/ is close-mid.
- Vowels and consonants are doubled to indicate longer pronunciation (ex: IPA for toolos 'knee' is [toːlos])

=== Consonants ===
	Labial	Alveolar		Retroflex	Palatal	Velar	Glottal
	Labial	hard	soft	Retroflex	Palatal	Velar	Glottal
Nasal	m ⟨m⟩	n ⟨n⟩	nʲ ⟨N⟩				
Stop	p ⟨p⟩	t ⟨t⟩	tʲ ⟨tY⟩	ʈ ⟨T⟩		k ⟨k⟩	ʔ ⟨ʼ⟩
Affricate		ts ⟨ts⟩			tʃ ⟨c⟩		
Fricative		s ⟨s⟩			ʃ ⟨S⟩		h ⟨h⟩
Approximant	w ⟨w⟩	l ⟨l⟩	lʲ ⟨L⟩		j ⟨y⟩		
Flap		ɾ ⟨r⟩					

== Alphabet ==
Unlike many Latin-script alphabets, Mutsun uses capital letters as separate sounds. The following alphabet is based on the alphabetization of the Mutsun-English dictionary and includes an example word.

Mutsun alphabet
Letter	Example word	Gloss
a	aacic	pipe
c	caahi	barn owl
d	diyos	God
e	eccer	iron (n)
h	haahe	run away (v)
i	icci	bite (v)
k	kaa	daughter
l	laake	rise (v)
L	Luohu	yearling calf
m	maahi	close, cover (v)
n	naaru	turnip
N	Notko	be short
o	oce	send
p	paaka	shell (v)
r	raakat	name (n)
s	saake	gather pinenuts
S	Saanay	near, nearby (adv)
t	taacin	river rat, kangaroo rat
T	Taakampi	bring, carry to
ts	tsayla	lie face up
tY	tYottYoni	holly berry
u	ucirmin	small needle
w	waaha	scratch, sing slowly
y	yaase	eat
ʼ	-ʼa	unknown meaning

== Bibliography ==
- Okrand, Marc (1977). Mutsun Grammar (Ph.D. dissertation). Berkeley: University of California.
- Warner, N. (2006). "Making a Dictionary for Community Use in Language Revitalization: The Case of Mutsun". International Journal of Lexicography. 19 (3): 257–285. doi:10.1093/ijl/ecl014.
- Warner, Natasha; Luna, Quirina; Butler, Lynnika (2007). "Ethics and revitalization of Dormant languages: The Mutsun language". Language Documentation & Conservation. 1 (1): 58–76. Archived from the original on January 7, 2024.
- Warner, Natasha; Butler, Lynnika; Geary, Quirina (February 20, 2016). mutsun-inkiS inkiS-mutsun riica pappel [Mutsun-English English-Mutsun Dictionary]. University of Hawai'i Press. hdl:10125/24679. ISBN 978-0-9856211-8-6.
- Warner, Natasha; Butler, Lynnika; Luna-Costillas, Quirina (September 2006). "Making a Dictionary for Community Use in Language Revitalization: The Case of Mutsun". International Journal of Lexicography. 19 (3): 257–285. doi:10.1093/ijl/ecl014.
- Warner, Natasha; Luna, Quirina; Butler, Lynnika; van Volkinburg, Heather (July 2009). "Revitalization in a scattered language community: problems and methods from the perspective of Mutsun language revitalization". International Journal of the Sociology of Language (198): 135–148. doi:10.1515/IJSL.2009.031. hdl:11858/00-001M-0000-0012-CC69-A. ISSN 0165-2516.
