= Yok-Utian languages =

Proposed language family of California

Yok-Utian
- (proposed)
- Geographic distribution: California
- Linguistic classification: Penutian ?: Yok-Utian
- Subdivisions: Yokuts; Utian

Language codes
- Glottolog: None
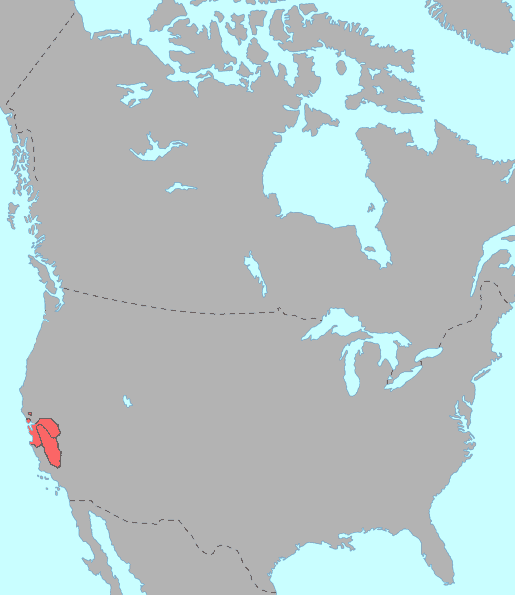
- Pre-contact distribution of Yok-Utian languages

Yok-Utian is a proposed language family of California. It consists of the Yokuts language and the Utian language family.

While connections between Yokuts and Utian languages were noticed through attempts to reconstruct their proto-languages in 1986, it was not until 1991 that Yok-Utian was proposed and named by Geoffrey Gamble. Yok-Utian has been further supported by Catherine Callaghan, who has argued for the family's existence on the basis of lexical, morphological, and phonological similarities between the reconstructed proto-languages. However, she and others have noted that while it is compelling, the evidence presented is not conclusive.

According to the proposal, the Yok-Utian proto-language was spoken by a group originating in the Great Basin at least as early as 4500 BC. There was a division as early as 2500 BC, as the group which began speaking Proto-Utian migrated from the Great Basin into California. Proto-Miwok began to emerge in the northern Bay Area between 1000 and 500 BC, and began to spread west and south. Proto-Costanoan emerged in the eastern Bay Area, splitting from the larger Utian group sometime after 1500 BC, if not earlier. The language that remained in the Great Basin turned into Proto-Yokuts before gradually splitting into the various Yokuts dialects and only later began to migrate into California. However, Scott DeLancey and Victor Golla have proposed that the language distribution could be the result of a single migration of Yok-Utian speakers who later spread out throughout California.

One component of the evidence offered for Yok-Utian is that of sound correspondences in the reconstructed proto-languages for Yokuts and the Utian family, such as the sample below.

Proto-Yokuts	Proto-Utian	English
[*waʔin]	[*waja]	"to give"
[*ʔatʰ-]	[*ʔat-]	"to split, break"

However, while the reconstructed correspondences can be compelling, they are not conclusive. As the speakers of the Yokuts and Utian languages were in contact with one another for hundreds or thousands of years, it is entirely possible that the sound correspondences are the result of borrowing, rather than a common linguistic ancestor.

While Yok-Utian can be included in the larger Penutian proposal, the Yok-Utian proposal does not directly support Penutian.
