= Johnella LaRose =

American grassroots organizer

Johnella LaRose is an American grassroots organizer based in the San Francisco Bay Area who advocates for Indigenous communities and the preservation and restitution of Indigenous lands. Alongside fellow Indigenous rights' activist Corrina Gould, LaRose is a co-founder of Indian People Organizing for Change (IPOC), a San Francisco Bay Area-based organization working to protect and raise awareness about the region's sacred shellmounds, and the Sogorea Te Land Trust, an urban land trust working to restore Indigenous stewardship of occupied Chochenyo and Karkin Ohlone lands in the East Bay Area.

== Early life and education ==
LaRose was born in Los Angeles, California, and raised on a reservation in Utah. Born to a military family, LaRose travelled frequently in her youth, and graduated from high school in Portland, Oregon, before eventually returning to California. In the late 1970s, she became involved in the Red Power Movement, and lived at the American Indian Movement Freedom and Survival School in Oakland. During this time, she joined the organizing efforts for the Longest Walk. She is a graduate of Mills College with a degree in Sociology and Cultural Anthropology.

== Projects ==
=== Indian People Organizing for Change ===
In 1998, LaRose began working with Corrina Gould to found Indian People Organizing for Change (IPOC), an activist group working to preserve and bring attention to the shellmounds of the Bay Area, such as the West Berkeley Shellmound and the Emeryville Shellmound, the latter of which was demolished and paved over, despite workers uncovering human remains during the excavation. IPOC's many organizing efforts throughout the years have included Peace Walks that simultaneously trace the sacred ancestral sites and protest against their destruction by urban redevelopment and design proposals for the Shellmound heritage sites that present inclusive, historically respectful alternatives to condominium developments being planned at these sites.

=== Sogorea Te' Land Trust ===
The Sogorea Te Land Trust was co-founded in 2012 by LaRose.
