= Corrina Gould =

American Activist from California

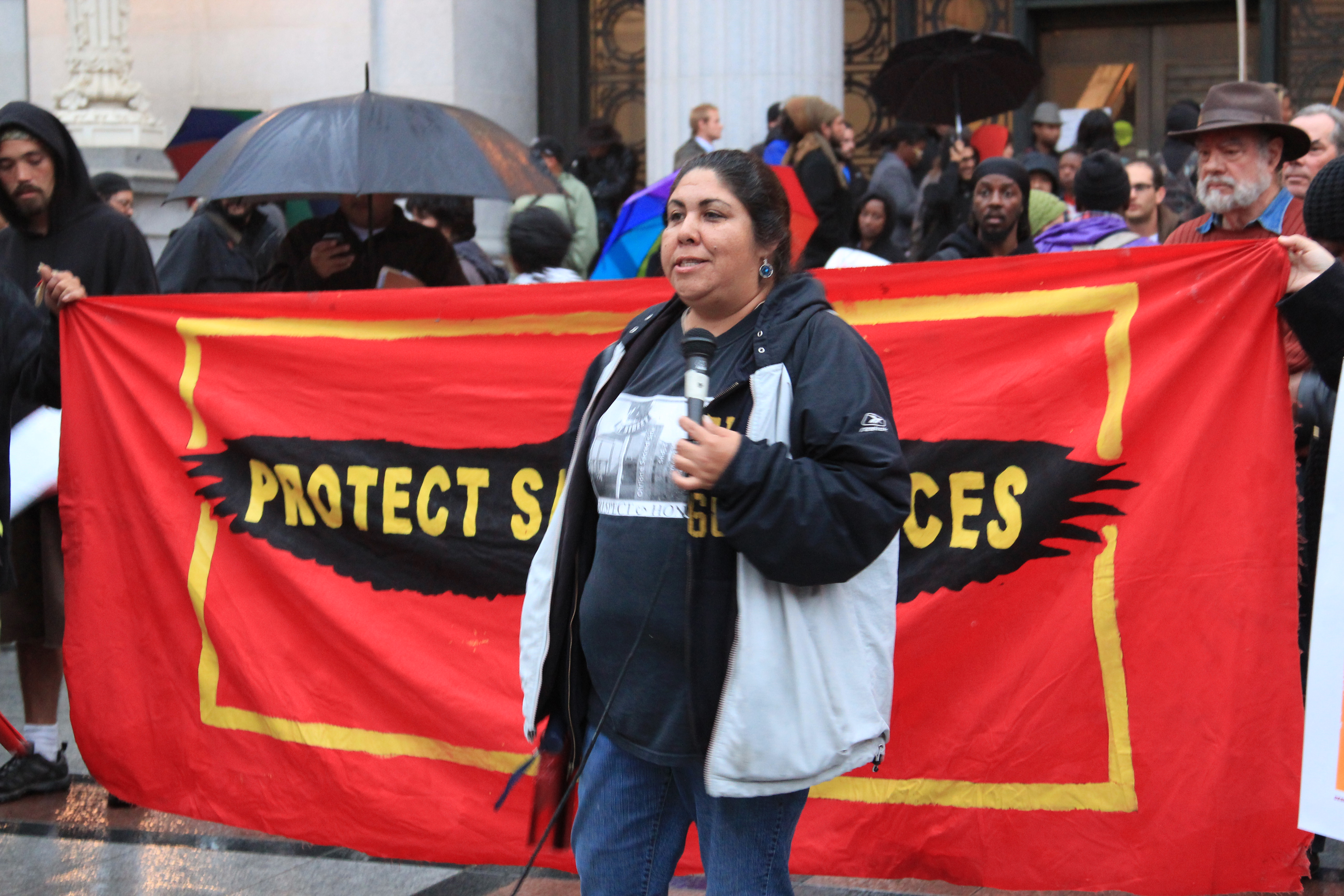
- Gould speaking at an Occupy Oakland decolonization protest
- Born: Corrina Emma Tucker; November 12, 1965 (age 61); Oakland, California
- Citizenship: American
- Known for: tribal chair of the Confederated Villages of Lisjan/Ohlone, cofounder of the Sogorea Te Land Trust and Indian People Organizing for Change

Corrina Gould is an American spokeswoman and tribal chair of the unrecognized Confederated Villages of Lisjan/Ohlone, a nonprofit organization. She identifies as a Chochenyo and a Karkin Ohlone woman and is a long-time activist who works to protect, preserve, and reclaim ancestral lands of the Ohlone peoples. The Ohlone people live in the greater San Francisco Bay Area, and Gould's organization, specifically, is located in the East Bay, in regions now occupied by Oakland, Berkeley, and beyond.

== Early life ==
Gould was born Corrina Emma Tucker, on November 12, 1965, and grew up in Oakland, California. She married Paul Gould Jr. (1964–2021), and took his name.

== Career ==
Gould worked full time at the American Indian Child Resource Center for 12 years, running an after school program that provides services for Native students in Oakland.

She is the tribal chair for the Confederated Villages of Lisjan/Ohlone, and a cofounder of the Sogorea Te Land Trust as well as Indian People Organizing for Change.

Gould was the producer of several documentaries about Ohlone peoples and other Native peoples. Her films include Buried Voices (2012), Injunuity (2013), and Beyond Recognition (2014).

In addition, Gould is a member of the board of directors for the Oakland Street Academy Foundation.

== Major campaigns ==
=== Indian People Organizing for Change (IPOC) ===
As the lead organizer for the group Indian People Organizing for Change (IPOC), Gould has worked for over two decades to preserve and protect Ohlone Shellmounds, the ancient burial sites of her ancestors. She is a cofounder of IPOC, which sponsored the Shellmound Peace Walk 2005–2009 and currently works to protect the West Berkeley Shellmound. She has also led the campaign to collect a Shuumi Land Tax in order to return land to Indigenous people through the Sogorea Te Land Trust.

=== West Berkeley Shellmound ===
Gould is currently focused on the West Berkeley Shellmound, at the site of the earliest known habitation in the Bay Area, the subterranean portions of which are currently covered by a parking lot. A developer with plans to build high density housing on that spot has been stopped by the City of Berkeley, motivated by Gould's activism. In 2000 the Berkeley City Council named the spot an historic landmark, and in September, 2020, the National Trust for Historic Preservation declared the site as one of the 11 “most endangered historic places” in the United States. Although the developer tried to get a streamlined approval process which would not have included as much public comment, the City did not pass that request and a judge further backed the City in a subsequent lawsuit. Gould and the IPOC have continued to advocate throughout for the preservation of the remaining portions of their sacred site.

=== 2011 sit-in ===
In April 2011, Gould, Johnella LaRose, Wounded Knee De Ocampo, and other held a sit-in at Sogorea Te, a sacred site in the current city of Vallejo, CA, that lasted 109 days. The occupation led to a cultural easement between the City of Vallejo, the Greater Vallejo Recreation District, and two federally recognized tribes.
