= Tongva Taraxat Paxaavxa Conservancy =

Indigenous land trust

- Purpose: Land return to the Indigenous peoples of the greater Los Angeles County area
- Website: tongva.land

The Tongva Taraxat Paxaavxa Conservancy is an Indigenous urban land trust that formed with the objective to return or repatriate land to self-identified Tongva descendants in the greater Los Angeles County area. It was inspired by the work of the Sogorea Te’ Land Trust and has been associated with the Land Back movement. The conservancy is notable for its part in the return of Tongva land in Los Angeles County for the first time in nearly 200 years. The trust developed a kuuy nahwá’a or "guest exchange" program for people who live and work in the tribe's traditional homelands to financially support the land trust's goals.

== Background ==
The Tongva experienced genocide and displacement from their lands known as Tovaangar since the arrival of settlers in the Los Angeles Basin area, which began with the Spanish mission period in the 18th century. The Spanish Empire founded Mission San Gabriel Arcángel in 1771, which became the site of displaced peoples and violence.

In the 19th century, following the American conquest of California in the Mexican–American War, soldiers and settlers carried out state-sanctioned genocidal massacres on the Indigenous peoples throughout the state known as the California genocide. Indigenous peoples concealed their identities among Mexican communities to keep their communities and cultures alive. In 1852, treaties that would have ensured about one-half of the current area of Los Angeles County for the tribe received hostility from settlers, who lobbied to prevent the treaties from being ratified.

Without federal recognition, the Tongva remained without a land base and have been effectively landless in their own traditional homelands for hundreds of years.

== Formation ==
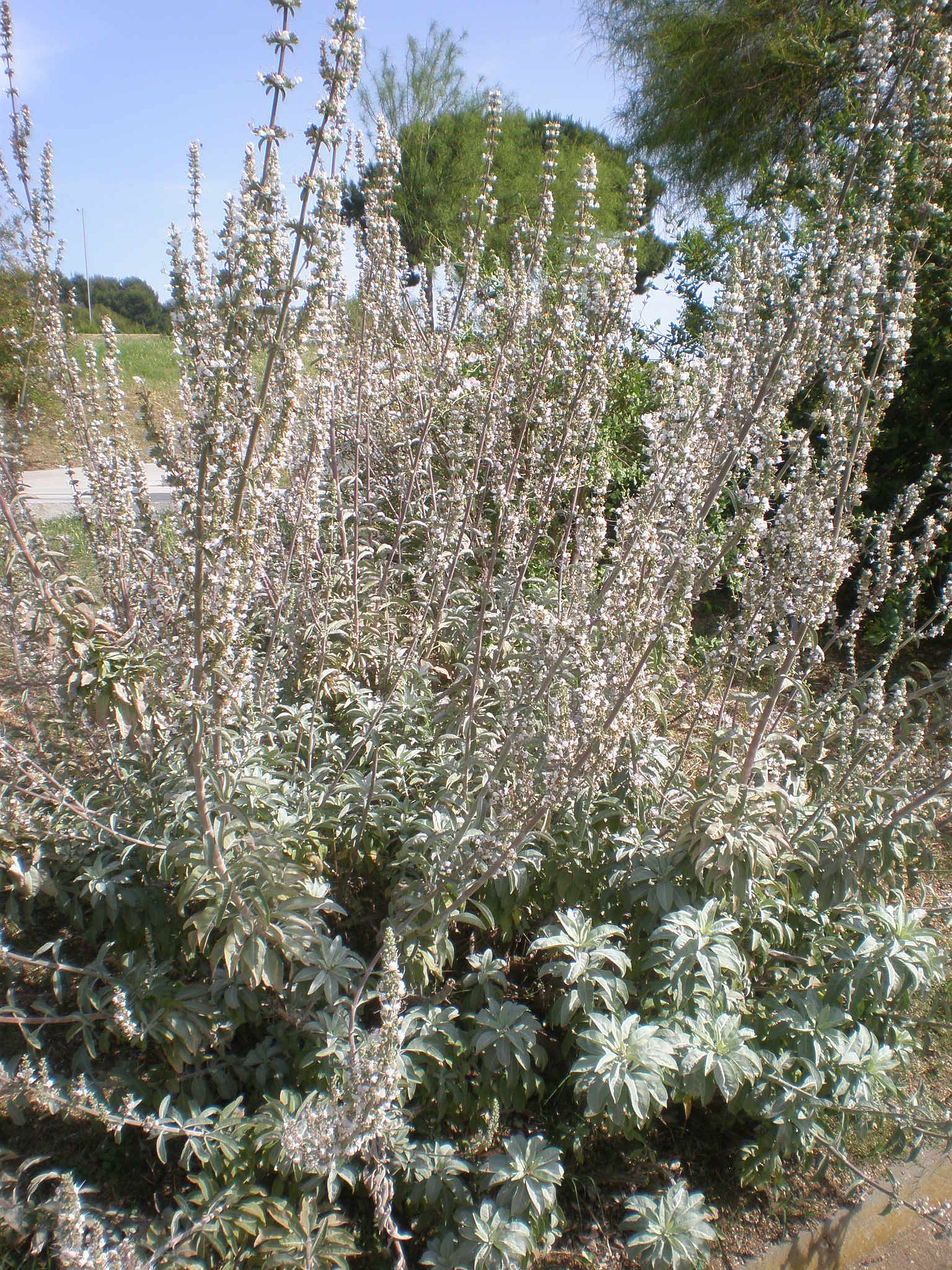
Part of the work of the land trust is to protect white sage plants in Southern California.

The Tongva Taraxat Paxaavxa Conservancy was established in 2021 and received nonprofit status in January 2022. Its formation is part of an effort to return land throughout the traditional homelands of the Tongva to the tribe.

The objectives of the conservancy are to steward and heal the lands by returning native plants to areas that have been overrun by invasive species, to protect the theft and destruction of wild white sage plants, and to build community toward supporting tribal members and cultural practices. The trust has also developed a kuuyam nahwá’a or "guest exchange" program for people who live and work in the tribe's traditional homelands to support the land trust's goals.

== History ==
The first land return was from a private resident of a 1-acre property (0.40 ha) in Altadena, California, in October 2022. The return was notable for being the first time the tribe had land anywhere in Los Angeles County in nearly 200 years. A grant to restore the sage scrub ecosystem was awarded in 2023 by the Wildlife Conservation Board.
