= West Berkeley Shellmound =

Historic site in California, United States

- Location: three blocks bounded by University Avenue, Hearst Avenue, I-880 and Fourth Street, Berkeley, California, U.S.
- Coordinates: 37.8679°N 122.3018°W
- Founded: ca. 3700 B.C.E., Chochenyo people

Berkeley Landmark
- Designated: February 7, 2000
- Reference no.: 228

The West Berkeley Shellmound, in West Berkeley, California, sits at the site of the earliest known habitation in the San Francisco Bay Area, a village of the Ohlone people on the banks of Strawberry Creek. The shellmound, or midden, was used for both burials and ceremonial purposes, and was a repository for shells, ritual objects, and ceremonial items. It is listed as a Berkeley Landmark. Part of the site was paved in the twentieth century and for many years was a restaurant parking lot. In the 21st century, the lot was acquired by a developer, but development plans were stalled by the City of Berkeley and local Native American activists. In 2024 an agreement was reached for the land to be returned to the Ohlone, facilitated by a gift to the Sogorea Te' Land Trust, which will pay the majority of the acquisition cost, with the city paying the remainder. An artificial mound covered with vegetation and housing an educational and memorial center is planned.

== History ==
The shellmound sits within the territory of the Chochenyo people, a division of the Indigenous Ohlone. Carbon dating puts the earliest additions to the shellmound at about 3700 B.C.E., with continuous additions from a village at the site until 800 C.E. The village, the earliest known habitation in the Bay Area, then relocated, but the mound remained in use for ceremonial purposes, including as a burial site and a repository for shells, ritual objects, and ceremonial items.

There are no remains of the village. The aboveground portions of the mound, reportedly 300 feet (91 m) long and 30 feet (9.1 m) high, were removed between 1853 and 1910 and used for road construction and other commercial purposes. The Berkeley City Council designated a three-block area as a city landmark in 2000. In the early 1970s, a 2.2-acre (0.89 ha) area at 1900 Fourth Street within the site was paved and became a parking lot for Spenger's Fish Grotto, a restaurant that operated from 1890 to 2018. Whether this paved area is on the site of a shellmound is disputed, but it is within the area sacred to the Ohlone.

=== Development proposal ===
Ruegg & Ellsworth LLC, a property developer, acquired a share in the parcel in 2000 and total ownership in 2022. The company proposed a mixed-use development to include 135 apartments and 33,000 square feet (3,100 m^{2}) dedicated to retail and food service; in 2018 the proposal was modified to include 260 residential units including below-market rate housing, to take advantage of the fast-track provisions of Senate Bill 35. Protests against the development of the site were strengthened after two sets of ancient human remains were discovered during construction at 1919 Fourth Street, outside the previously established boundaries of the shellmound. In September 2020, the National Trust for Historic Preservation declared the site one of the 11 "most endangered historic places" in the United States.

The City of Berkeley did not grant permission for the proposed development in either form, partly in response to Indigenous activists including Corrina Gould, a local Lisjan Ohlone leader, and organizations including the Coalition to Save the West Berkeley Shellmound and Indian People Organizing for Change. The developers sued the city; in 2019, a judge ruled in favor of the city, but on April 20, 2021, a three-justice panel of the California Court of Appeal unanimously declared that "[t]here is no evidence in the record that the Shellmound is now present on the project site in a state that could reasonably be viewed as an existing structure, nor even remnants recognizable as part of a structure" that would be disturbed by the development and that the project could proceed. The City of Berkeley and the Confederated Villages of Lisjan sought review from the California Supreme Court of the order allowing the development to proceed, but only one, rather than the required four, Justices considered the case appropriate for further review, so the appellate decision allowing the development to proceed became law. A building permit was issued in 2022, but work has not begun at the site. The developer sued the city for financial damages, and a trial date was set for April 2024.

== Planned Ohlone memorial park ==
Ohlone people opposed to the development of the parking lot proposed a park and memorial center. In March 2024, an agreement was reached under which Ruegg & Ellsworth will sell the land to representatives of the Ohlone for $27 million, of which $1.5 million will be paid by the city and the remaining $25.5 million by Sogorea Te' Land Trust, an organization for the return of Indigenous lands, facilitated by a recent $20 million gift. Gould's plan is to uncover the creek and use the site for a park surrounding a vegetated mound 40 feet (12 m) tall housing an educational and memorial center.
