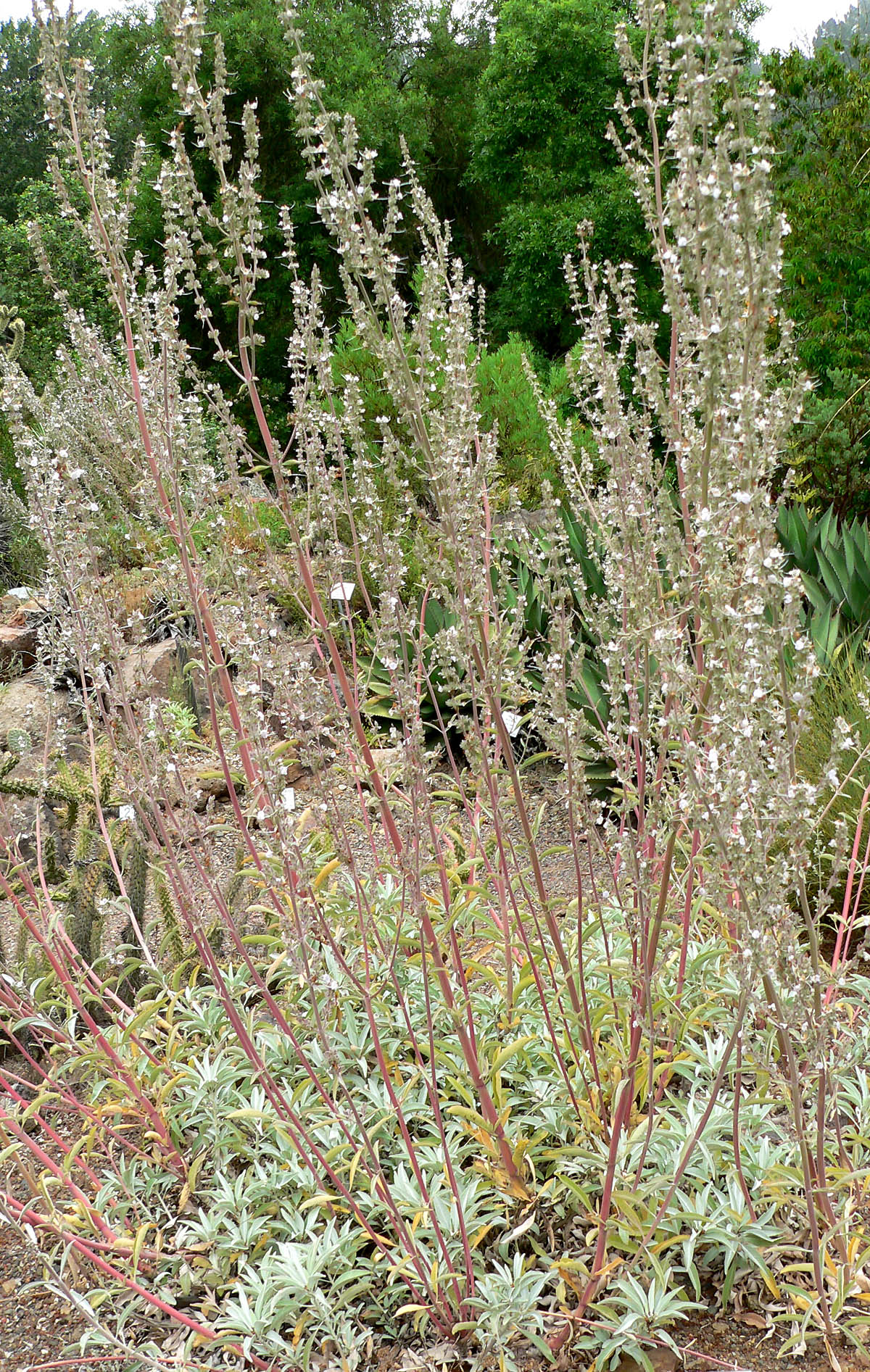

Scientific classification
- Kingdom: Plantae
- Clade: Tracheophytes
- Clade: Angiosperms
- Clade: Eudicots
- Clade: Asterids
- Order: Lamiales
- Family: Lamiaceae
- Genus: Salvia
- Species: S. apiana

Binomial name
- Salvia apiana Jeps.

= Salvia apiana =

White sage

Species of shrub

Salvia apiana, the Californian white sage, bee sage, or sacred sage is an evergreen perennial shrub that is native to the southwestern United States and northwestern Mexico, found mainly in the coastal sage scrub habitat of Southern California and Baja California, on the western edges of the Mojave and Sonoran deserts.

== Description ==
Salvia apiana is a shrub that reaches 1.3 to 1.5 metres (4.3 to 4.9 ft) tall and 1.3 metres (4.3 ft) wide. The whitish evergreen leaves are 3 to 9 cm (1.2 to 3.5 in) and persist throughout the year; they are opposite with crenulate margins. Leaves are thickly covered in hairs that trigger oil glands; when rubbed oils and resins are released, producing a strong aroma. The flowers are very attractive to bees, which is described by the specific epithet, apiana. Several 1 to 1.3 metres (3.3 to 4.3 ft) flower stalks, sometimes pinkish colored, grow above the foliage in the spring. Flowers are white to pale lavender.

== Distribution and habitat ==
Californian white sage is a common plant that requires well-drained dry soil, full sun, and little water. The plant occurs on dry slopes in coastal sage scrub, chaparral, and yellow-pine forests of Southern California to Baja California at less than 1,500 metres (4,900 ft) elevation.

== Ecology ==
Flowers attract varied pollinators including bumblebees, carpenter bees, Bombyliidae, and hummingbirds. However most of these species are ineffective pollinators, with only three species of carpenter bee and one species of bumblebee actually leading to routine pollination.

=== Pests and disease ===
The terpenoids and essential oils found in white sage likely deter herbivory.

== Uses ==
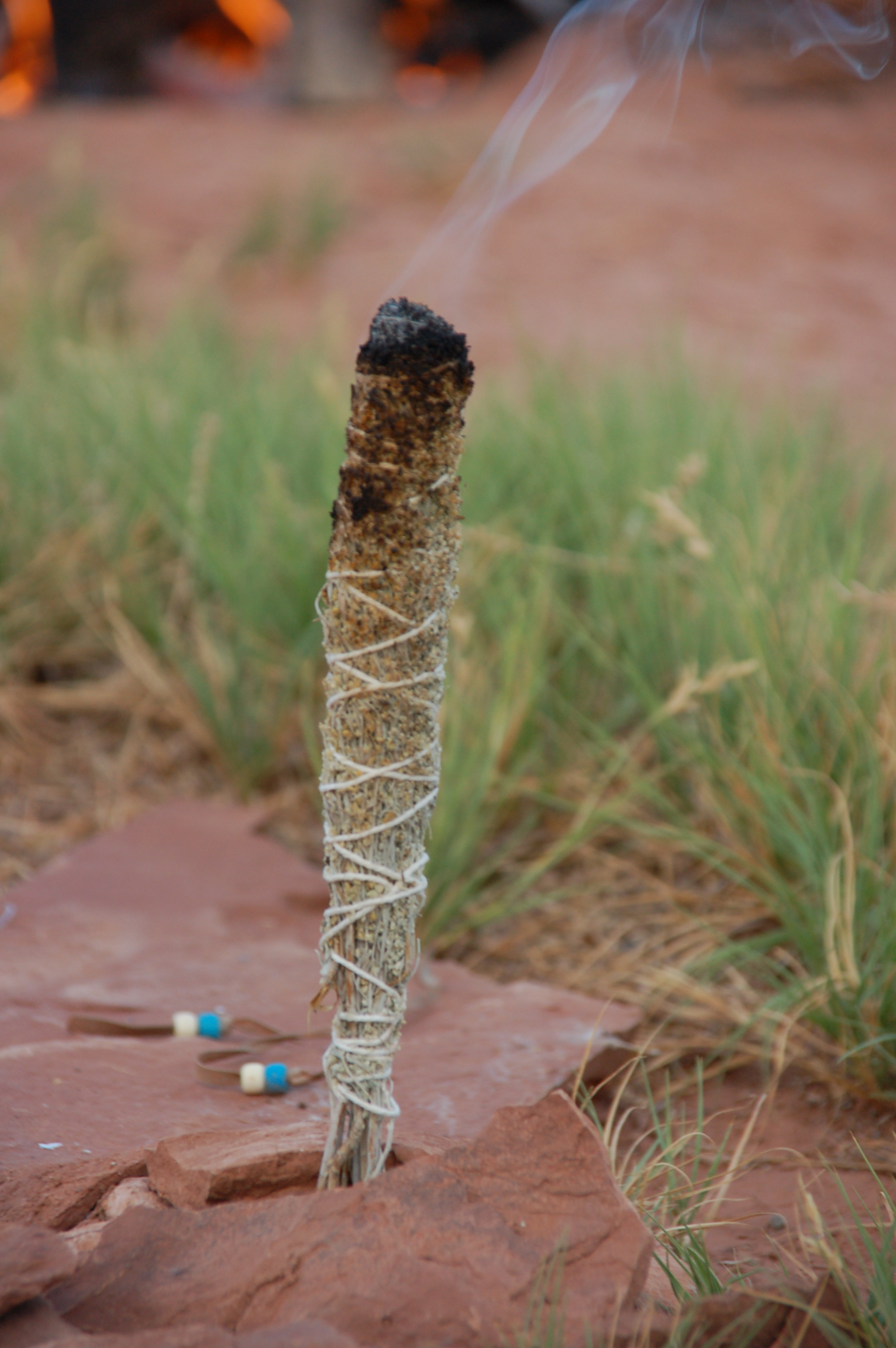
Burning sage bundle

Salvia apiana is widely used by Native American peoples on the Pacific coast of the United States. The seed is a traditional flavouring in pinole, a staple food made from maize. The Cahuilla people have traditionally harvested large quantities of the seed, then mixed it with wheat flour and sugar to make gruel and biscuits. The leaves and stems are a traditional food among the Chumash people and neighboring communities.

For healing use, several tribes have traditionally used the seed for removing foreign objects from the eye, similar to the way that Clary sage seeds have been used in Europe. A tea from the roots is traditional among the Cahuilla women for healing and strength after childbirth.

Different parts of the plant are also used in ritual purification by several Native American cultures.

White sage is overharvested to sell commercially for smudging, incense sticks and cones.

== Conservation ==
Over-harvest of wild Californian white sage populations is a concern held by many Native American groups and conservationists. Over-harvesting is negatively affecting the wild population and distribution of white sage. It is believed that illegal harvest is occurring on public lands and non-permitted harvesting is also taking place on private land. In June 2018, four people were arrested for the illegal harvest of 400 pounds of white sage in North Etiwanda Preserve of Rancho Cucamonga, California. Due to the potential for overharvesting and the plant's sacredness to certain Indigenous tribes, many Native Americans have asked non-Natives to refrain from the usage of white sage.

It is frequently suggested that white sage is protected by the Endangered Species Act of 1973, which is a common misconception. Collecting plants without permission from a landowner or land manager is illegal. Although Californian white sage is not listed on the Endangered Species List, conservationists are still concerned about the future survival and distribution of the species. The destruction of white sage has become a focus of the Tongva Taraxat Paxaavxa Conservancy.

== Cultivation ==
Salvia apiana prefers a sunny location, well draining soil, and good air circulation. It easily hybridizes with other Salvia species, particularly Salvia leucophylla and Salvia clevelandii.

== Image gallery ==
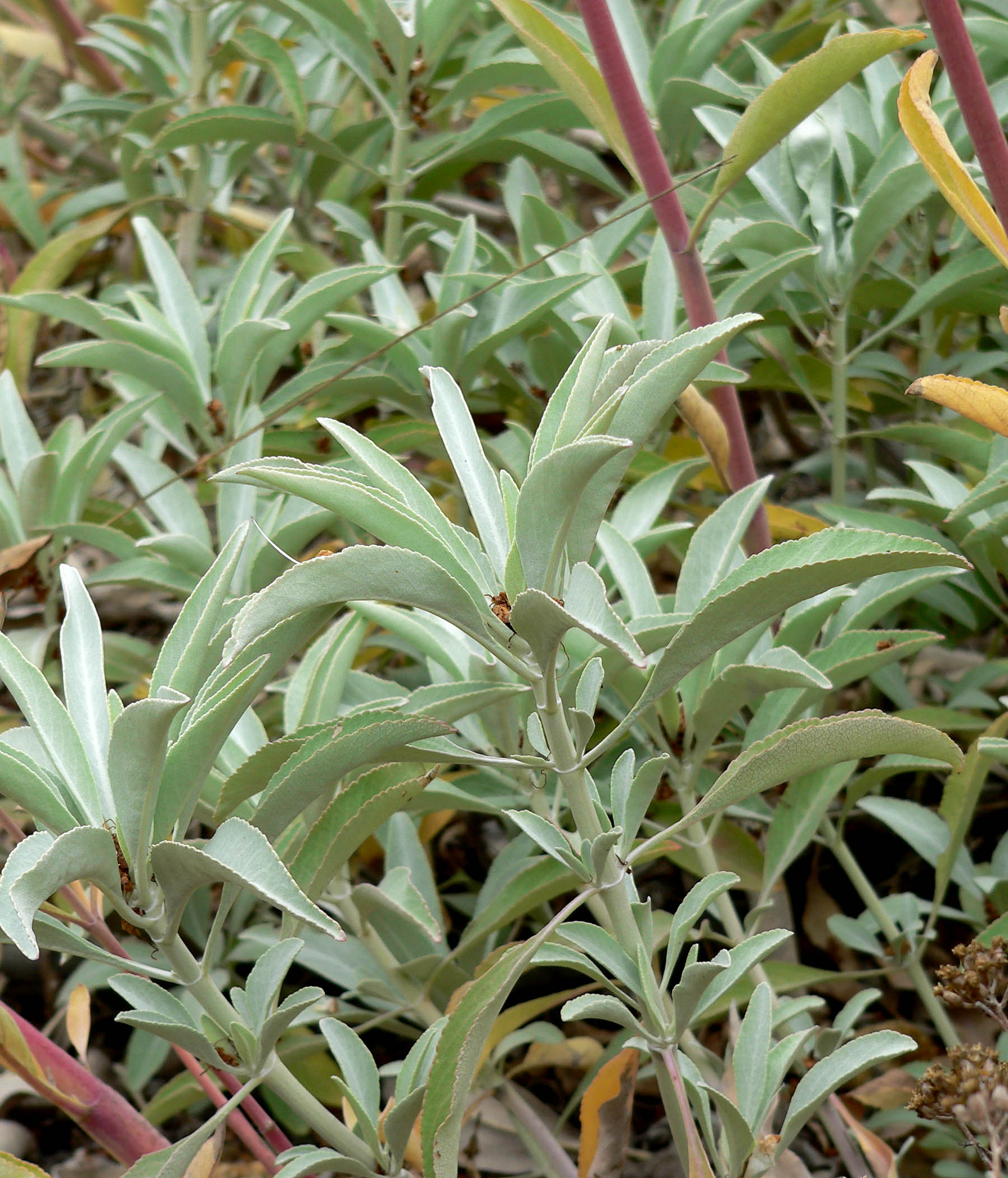
Glaucous foliage of Salvia apiana

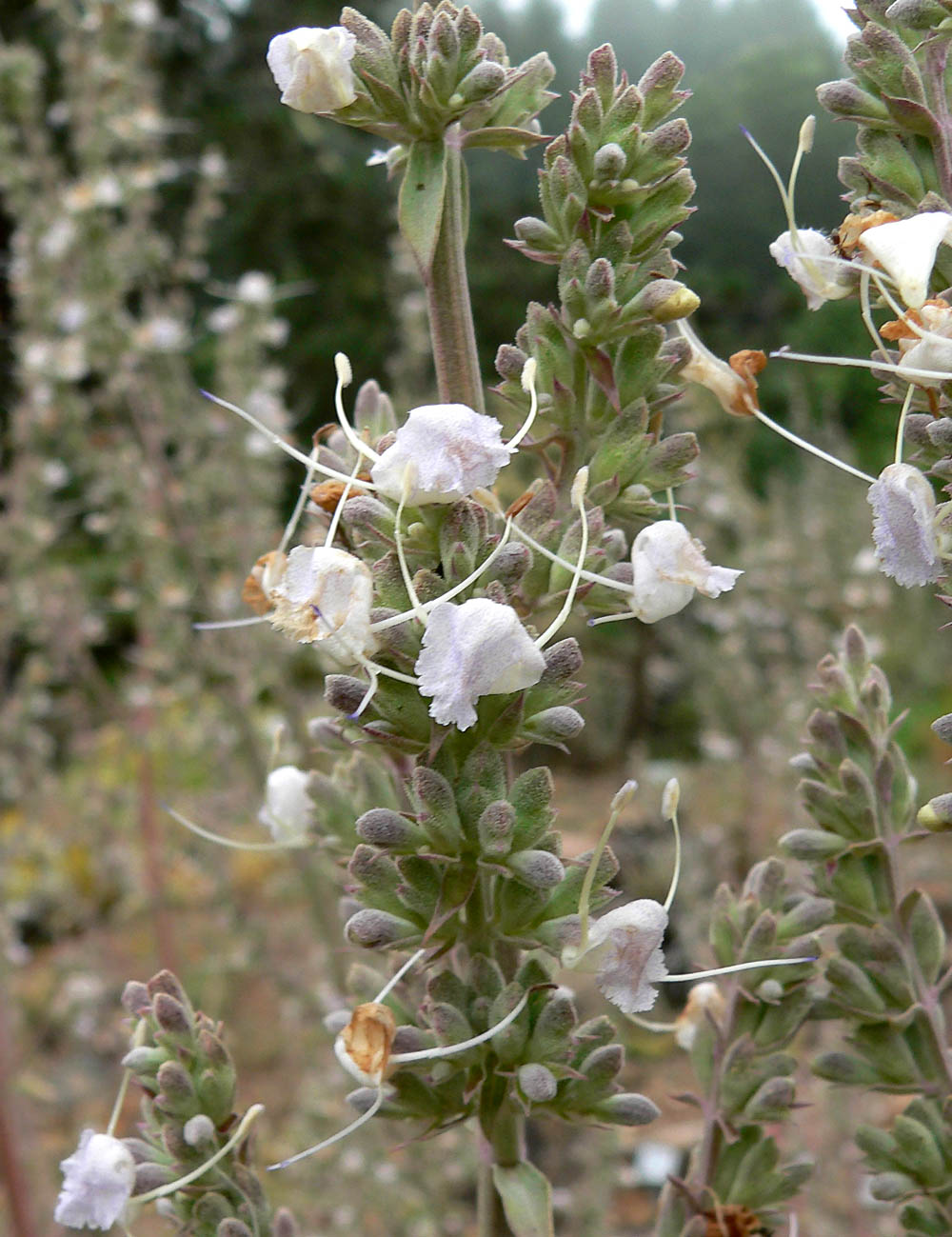
Close-up of characteristic flowers

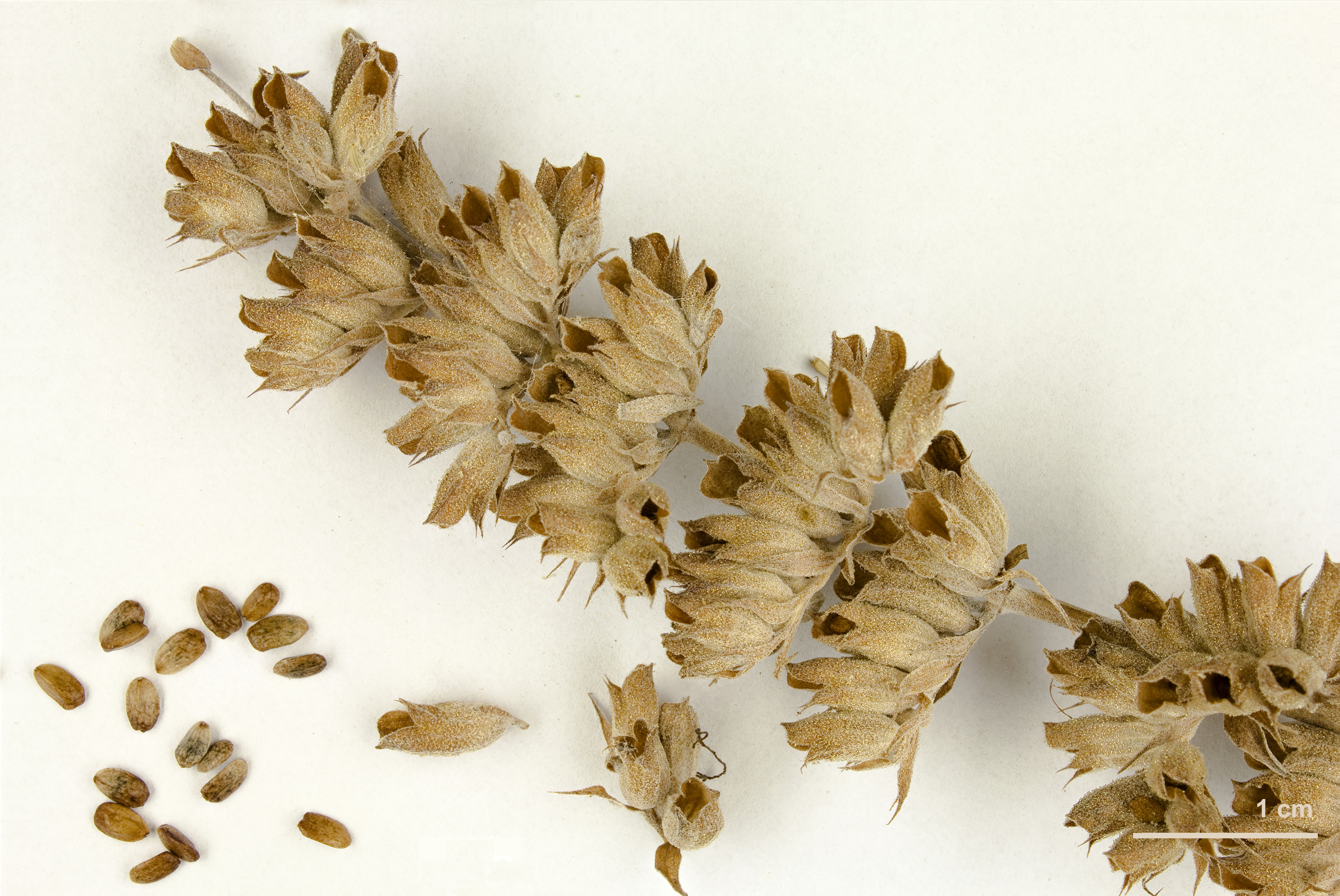
Salvia apiana dried flower - MHNT
