= Karkin people =

Division of the Ohlone people of Northern California

Karkin
Regions with significant populations
- United States (California)

Languages
- English, formerly Karkin

Religion
- Traditional tribal religion

The Karkin people (also called Los Carquines in Spanish) are one of eight Ohlone peoples, Indigenous peoples of California.

== History ==
The Karkin people have historically lived in the Carquinez Strait region in the northeast portion of the San Francisco Bay estuary. They spoke the Karkin language, the only documentation of which is a single vocabulary obtained by linguist-missionary Felipe Arroyo de la Cuesta at Mission Dolores in 1821 from Karkin speaker Mariano Antonio Sagnegse. According to de la Cuesta, karkin means 'to trade.' Although meager, the records of Karkin show that it constituted a distinct branch of Costanoan/Ohlone, strikingly different from the neighboring Chochenyo and other Ohlone languages spoken farther south and across the bay. It is believed that there were about 200 Karkin speakers before colonization.

Starting in 1787, some Karkin people began moving to Mission Dolores in present-day San Francisco. In 1804 and 1807, Karkins resisted attempts by Mission Indians to recapture fugitive Indians who had escaped the mission. The last Karkins moved to the mission between 1809 and 1810. At the end of 1817, 49 Karkins were living at Mission Dolores. By the end of 1823, 35 Karkin people lived at Mission Dolores, Mission San Francisco Solano, and Mission San Jose, seven of whom had been born in the missions.

In 1925, Alfred Kroeber, then director of the Hearst Museum of Anthropology, declared the Ohlone extinct, which directly led to its losing federal recognition and land rights.

The Confederated Villages of Lisjan is a tribe made up of Karkin and six other neighboring indigenous groups.

Corrina Gould is a Karkin and Chochenyo activist who co-founded Indian People Organizing for Change and the Sogorea Te’ Land Trust, and is the spokesperson for the Confederated Villages of Lisjan.

== See also ==
- Sogorea Te Land Trust
