= Indian Canyon, California =

Indian Canyon (formerly known as Indian Gulch) is the only federally recognized Indian Country from Sonoma to the coast of Santa Barbara in California. As the only such place within the original Costanoan-Ohlone territory, anyone of Native American heritage can come to Indian Canyon to hold ceremonies on this sacred and traditional land. Until 1978, when the American Indian Religious Freedom Act was passed, Native Americans were prohibited from practicing traditional forms of spirituality.

The canyon is a mile long, and contains canopies of trees, streams, and a cascading waterfall. The parcel contains more than 30 gathering areas and nine sweat lodges are available for ceremonies. The canyon's arbor is used for cultural storytelling, chanting, and dancing that bring together Indigenous peoples from around the world, from the Maori of New Zealand to the Gwich’in of Alaska.

== Ann-Marie Sayers and the reclamation of Indian Canyon ==
Anne Marie Sayers is a Mutsun Ohlone leader and the former tribal chair of the Indian Canyon Nation. She was born and raised in Indian Canyon, on her great-grandfather's trust allotment – a piece of land granted to an individual Native American – which had been established in 1911. In a landmark 8-year case ending in 1998, Sayers used the Dawes Act (also known as the Allotment Act of 1887) to reclaim land in the Indian Canyon, that had belonged to her family for centuries.

Sayers is also the Director of the Costanoan Indian Research, Inc., an organization based in the Indian Canyon, dedicated to the preservation and return of native artifacts to their tribal groups.

In 2015, during Pope Francis's visit to the United States, Sayers joined religious leaders across the country to protest fracking.

Sayers' story is the subject of a short documentary, In the Land of My Ancestors, produced by photojournalist Rucha Chitnis.
