= Chochenyo =

Division of the Ohlone people of Northern California

lisiánish
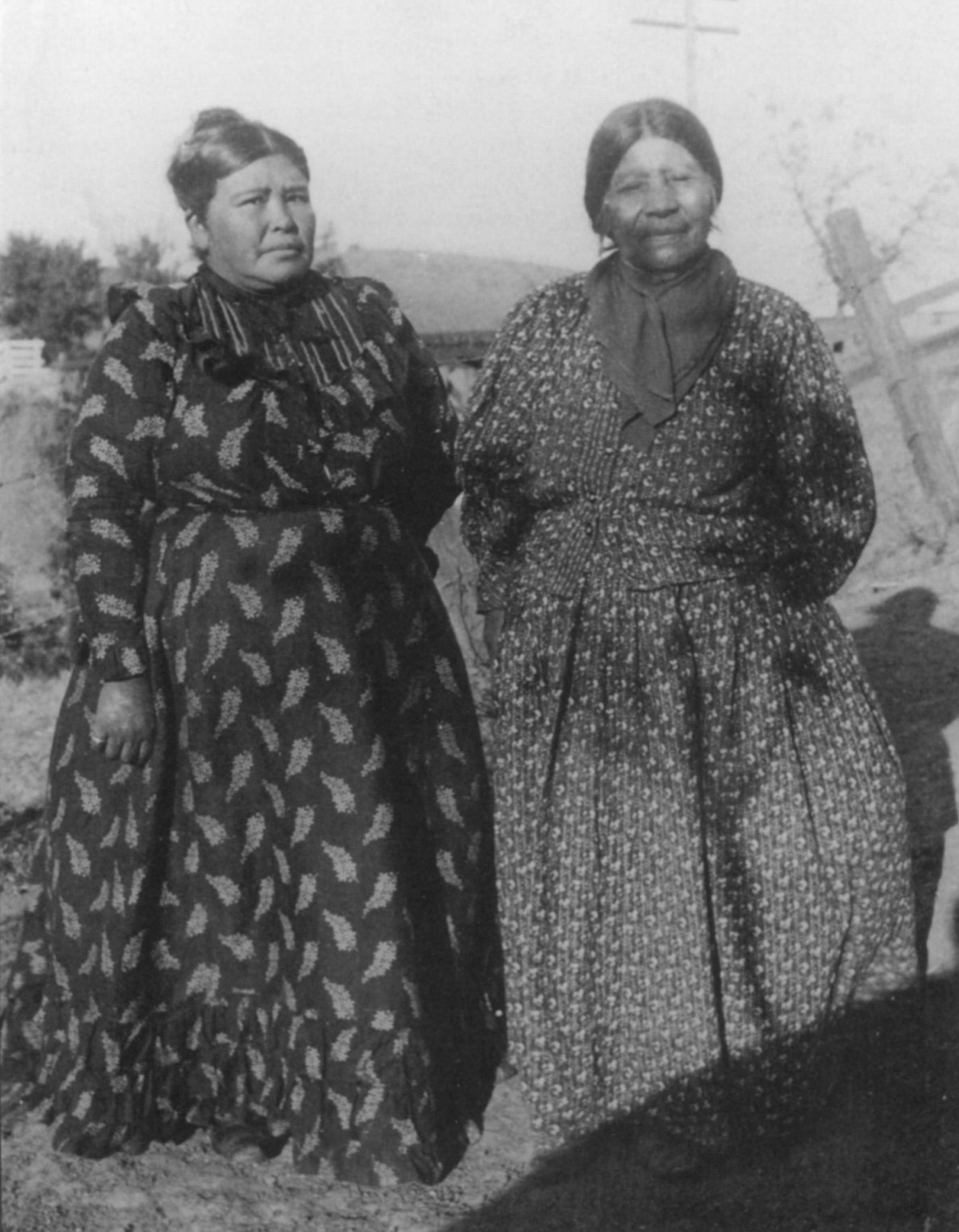
- Ohlone elders at Alisal Rancheria (now Pleasanton, California)

Languages
- Chochenyo language

Religion
- Kuksu, Roman Catholicism

Related ethnic groups
- other Ohlone peoples

The Chochenyo (also called Chocheño, Chocenyo) are one of the divisions of the Ohlone, an Indigenous people of Northern California. The Chochenyo resided on the east side of the San Francisco Bay (the East Bay), primarily in what is now Alameda County, and also Contra Costa County, from the Berkeley Hills inland to the western Diablo Range.

== Language ==
Map of Chochenyo dialects in the East Bay of the San Francisco Bay Area

They spoke the Chochenyo dialect (also called Chocheño and East Bay Costanoan), which was one of the Costanoan dialects in the Utian family. Linguistically, Chochenyo, Tamyen (also Tamien) and Ramaytush are thought to be close dialects of a single language.

== Historical subsistence ==
The Ohlone tribes were hunter-gatherers who moved into the San Francisco Bay Region around 500 CE, displacing earlier Esselen people. In Chochenyo territory, datings of the ancient Newark Shellmound, West Berkeley Shellmound, and Emeryville Shellmound attest to people residing in the Bay Area since 4000 BCE.

== Territory ==
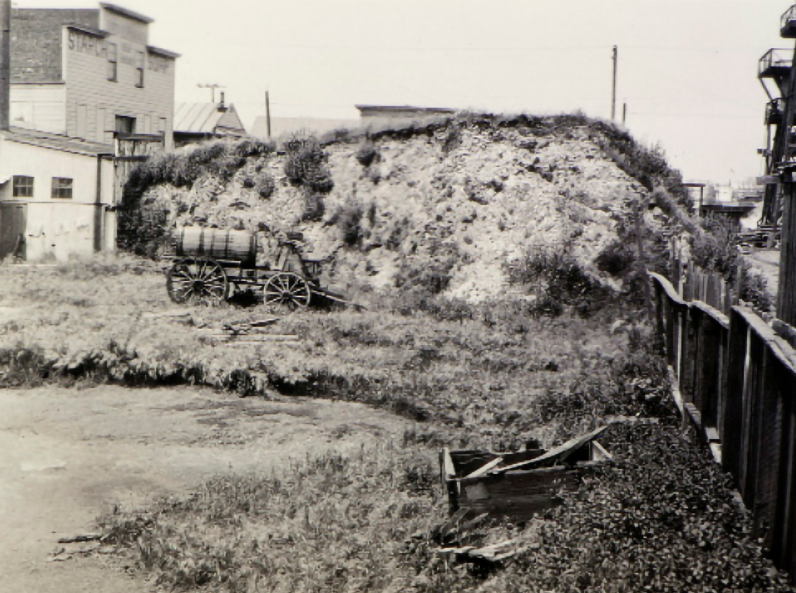
The West Berkeley Shellmound, a Chochenyo shellmound

Chochenyo territory was bordered by Karkin territory to the north (at Mount Diablo), Tamyen territory to the south and southwest, and the San Francisco Bay to the west, overlapping a bit with the Bay Miwok and Yokuts to the east.

== History ==
During the California Mission Era, the Chochenyo moved en masse to the Mission San Francisco de Asís (founded in 1776) in San Francisco, and Mission San José of Fremont (founded in 1797). Most moved into one of these missions and were baptized, lived and educated to be Catholic neophytes, also known as Mission Indians. When the missions were discontinued by the Mexican Government in 1834, the people found themselves landless. A large majority of the Chochenyo died from disease in the missions and shortly thereafter, with only a fragment remaining by 1900. The speech of the last two native speakers of Chochenyo was documented in the 1920s in the unpublished fieldnotes of the Bureau of American Ethnology linguist John Peabody Harrington.

In 1925, Alfred Kroeber, then director of the Hearst Museum of Anthropology, declared the Ohlone extinct, which directly led to its losing federal recognition and land rights.

== Contemporary descendants ==
Today, some Ohlone, of which most are Chochenyo, have formed the Muwekma Ohlone Tribe. As of 2007, the Muwekma Ohlone Tribe were petitioning for U.S. federal recognition.

In 2017, Chochenyo chef Vincent Medina and his Rumsen partner Louis Trevino opened Cafe Ohlone in Berkeley, focused on traditional Chochenyo foods and cultural restoration.

== See also ==
- List of Ohlone villages
- Sogorea Te Land Trust
