= Sogorea Te Land Trust =

Indigenous land trust in California

- Founder: Corrina Gould and Johnella LaRose
- Website: sogoreate-landtrust.com

The Sogorea Te Land Trust is an urban land trust founded in 2012 with the goals of returning traditionally Chochenyo and Karkin lands in the San Francisco Bay Area to Indigenous stewardship and cultivating more active, reciprocal relationships with the land. The land trust inspired the work of the Tongva Taraxat Paxaavxa Conservancy in the Los Angeles region of Southern California.

== Background ==
=== Ohlone history ===
The Ohlone people have lived in what is now the Bay Area since 4000 BCE. The arrival of Spanish soldiers and missionaries in the 18th century disrupted and undermined the Ohlone people's way of life, and their population (along with that of other indigenous groups in California) was reduced to a fraction of its former size. When California was incorporated into the United States, the Ohlone (as well as most other indigenous groups) were denied land and legal recognition by the United States.

=== Modern activism ===
Beginning in the 1970s, Ohlone descendants have engaged in efforts to reclaim historic Ohlone land, and to revitalize their languages and cultures. In the 1990s, Corrina Gould (a Chochenyo and Karkin Ohlone leader) and Johnella LaRose (of Shoshone–Bannock and Carrizo heritage) co-founded Indian People Organizing for Change.

== History ==
In 2011, Indigenous People Organizing for Change led the occupation of a construction site for a waterfront property called Glen Cove Park, which was being built on the site of an ancient Ohlone village, gathering place, and burial ground, known as Sogorea Te in the Karkin language. While the occupation was successful and development was halted, the land was not turned over to the Ohlone people, as they are denied recognition as a Native American tribe by the federal government of the United States. Instead, the land was transferred to the nearest federally recognized tribe, the Yocha Dehe Wintun Nation, which lacked any connection to the location or to the occupation, and consequently gave significant concessions to the land developers.

To prevent a similar situation from occurring again, the Sogorea Te Land Trust was founded in 2012 by Gould and LaRose as a way to collectively own and buy back the traditional lands of the Karkin and Chochenyo people. The first plot of land for the Land Trust was donated by Planting Justice, a non-profit organization dedicated to improving food security, and is located near 105th Avenue in Oakland. A second piece of land, consisting of a small garden, was secured in 2018 on 30th and Linden in West Oakland. Another parcel of land in Southwest Berkeley was donated to the trust in 2022. The land has been used as a community garden since 2004, with support from the nonprofit We Bee Gardeners.

== Purpose ==
The vision for the land trust is for it to be a patchwork of small plots of land across the East Bay, the traditional territory of the Chochenyo and Karkin divisions of the Ohlone people, that would be available for communal use, beginning with land that is either owned by the city, neglected, abandoned, or under a lien. The organization is also in the process of building a ceremonial space at its 105th Avenue location. Long-term goals for the project include a burial ground for the bones of Ohlone ancestors, medicine plant gardens, and educational and cultural centers for native languages and cultures. The organization also hopes to create an opportunity for all people to develop more active relationships with the land and as a community.

== Shuumi Land Tax ==
In order to financially support their goals, the Sogorea Te Land Trust has begun a project that it calls the Shuumi Land Tax (shuumi means "gift" in Ohlone languages), which asks non-indigenous people living on Ohlone land to pay dues for the land that they live on. The tax has no legal ramifications and no connection with the local and state governments or the Internal Revenue Service. The organization prefers this term (as opposed to merely calling contributions donations) as it asserts indigenous sovereignty. The suggested tax amount is calculated based on the would-be taxpayer's usage of the land: renters are asked to pay a small percentage of their rent, homeowners are expected to pay based on the number of rooms (for an estimated total between $65 and $500). Those who use the land for commercial purposes are expected to make a contribution based on the size and scale of their business.

== In media ==
The founding of the Sogorea Te Land Trust is the subject of the film Beyond Recognition, produced in 2014 by Underexposed Films.
