= Dana Thompson =

American restaurateur

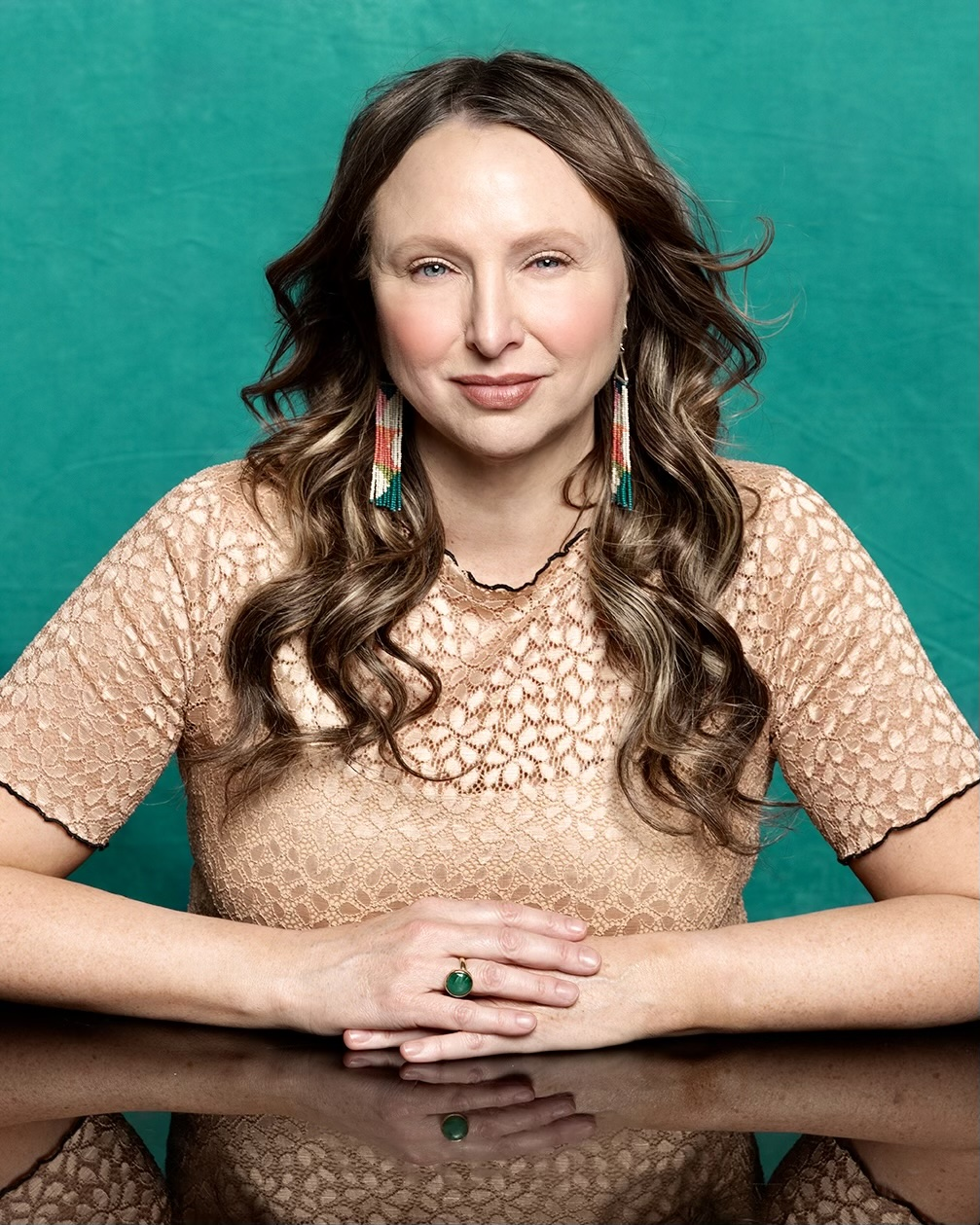
Thompson in 2020

Dana Thompson is an American restaurateur, songwriter, and promoter of indigenous cuisine and food sovereignty. In 2022, her Minneapolis, Minnesota, restaurant Owamni won the James Beard Award for Best New Restaurant.

== Early life ==
Thompson was born in Sandstone, Minnesota, to Paul Thompson, who served as the chief of police, and Anne Felix Thompson, who was of Dakota, French, and Irish descent and worked as a homemaker.

She is a descendant of Wahpeton-Sisseton and Mdewakanton Dakota through a grandfather, Clem Felix, who worked with Paul Durand to record place names. In Sandstone, her father was investigated by the Bureau of Criminal Apprehension for a violent crime. Their family then moved to Pipestone, Minnesota where her father, still a police officer, was charged and convicted of multiple felonies. After the trial, the family moved to Hibbing, Minnesota where her mother became a registered nurse and later a delegate for the Democratic Farmer Labor Party. Thompson started working in restaurants as a teenager. She left at Hibbing age 15, moved to Duluth with her mother, and eventually to Minneapolis, where she worked in the music industry and in a variety of retail organizations as a marketing and branding specialist.

== Career ==
In 2014, Thompson and Sean Sherman met at a dinner where he was preparing and speaking about indigenous foods, and she offered to become his manager. They became romantically involved soon after and created a formal business partnership in 2015. According to The New Yorker and MplsStPaul Magazine, Thompson's work helped Sherman gain wide recognition.

Thompson was co-owner with Sean Sherman of The Sioux Chef, which started as a catering business, and was its chief operating officer. She and Sherman founded two of its projects, Owamni, a Minneapolis restaurant serving indigenous cuisine; and NATIFS, an indigenous food educational nonprofit organization for which Thompson was executive director.

In 2017, Thompson and Sherman founded North American Traditional Indigenous Food Systems, or NATIFS, a nonprofit which promotes indigenous cuisine and food sovereignty. The organization operates the Indigenous Food Lab within the Midtown Global Market.

In 2021, Thompson and Sherman opened Owamni in Minneapolis. The restaurant was funded by a 2016 Kickstarter campaign and through a partnership with the Minneapolis Park & Recreation Board, which had around the same time announced a request for proposals for a venue then being planned at Mill Ruins Park. In 2022 Owamni was named Best New Restaurant by the James Beard Foundation. Later the same year, the Indigenous Food Lab was named one of Bon Appetit's Heads of the Table.

In 2023, the nonprofit NATIFS acquired Owamni to be run as a not-for-profit and Thompson left to pursue other opportunities.

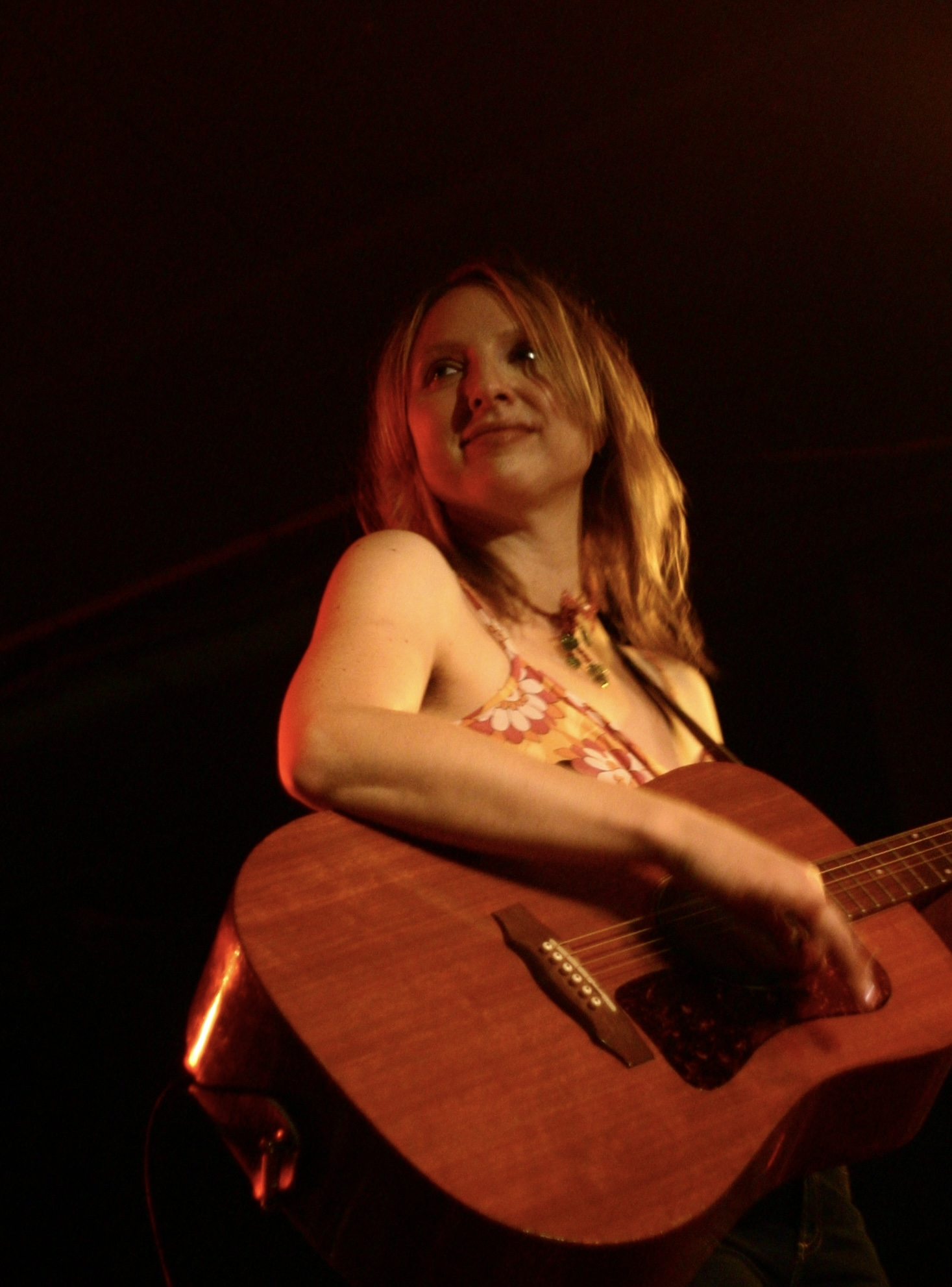
Thompson playing a guitar in 2004

In 2024, Thompson created the social impact brand Heti (which means home in Dakota), where a percentage of revenues is going to develop housing out of Hempcrete for tribal community members.

Also in 2024, Thompson launched a company to create Indigenous food experiences called The Modern Indigenous with chef Dawn Drouillard, a direct descendant of the Grand Portage band of Ojibwe.

As of 2023, Thompson was working on a memoir about her traumatic childhood.

== Personal life ==
Thompson's romantic relationship with Sherman ended shortly after Owamni opened. She has a daughter. Thompson is also a singer and songwriter; she is a jazz and Americana vocalist and plays multiple instruments.

She studied guitar and songwriting in Austin, Texas.
