= Original Local =

2013 cookbook by Heid E. Erdrich

Original Local: Indigenous Foods, Stories and Recipes from the Upper Midwest
- Author: Heid E. Erdrich
- Language: English
- Subject: Native American cuisine
- Genre: Cookbook
- Publisher: Minnesota Historical Society Press
- Publication date: October 2013
- Publication place: United States
- Media type: Book
- Pages: 264
- ISBN: 978-0873518949

Original Local: Indigenous Foods, Stories and Recipes from the Upper Midwest is a recipe/collage book written by Heid E. Erdrich and published by the MN Historical Society Press in Minneapolis, Minnesota. Heid E. Sherman is a member of the North Dakota Turtle Mountain Band of the Ojibwe people (and also half-German), currently based in South Minneapolis. Her cookbook explores native american cuisine and indigenous ingredients within a globally-aware framework that includes stories, recollections, and anecdotes.

== Origins ==
Original Local grew out of the "locavore" movement—the push to buy and consume locally grown food. Heid noticed that, in all the enthusiasm in the Midwest within that movement, there was a complete lack of awareness about the foods' indigenous origins. She started working with the Minnesota Historical Society Press on a project to address that gap, and that grew into this complete work. Other work in this 'return to healthy indigenous eating' space includes Foods of the Americas: Native Recipes and Traditions, written by husband/wife team Fernando Divina and Marlene Divina and published by the Smithsonian National Museum of the American Indian when it opened in 2004, and The Sioux Chef's Indigenous Kitchen by Sean Sherman and Beth Dooley in 2017, a 2006 Television Series called 'Seasoned With Spirit: A Native Cook's Journey with Loretta Barrett Oden', organizations including Native Seeds/SEARCH and the International Institute of Indigenous Science-Indigenous Permaculture, and various groups focusing on sustainable agriculture.

== Cuisine ==
The cookbook also takes some poetic license with the concepts of authentic traditions - Erdrich challenges limitations and incorporates dynamic, contemporary ingredients and cooking styles. The book showcases a spectrum of Ojibwe, Ho-Chunk, Menominee, Potawatomi and Mandan gardeners and harvesters; while also incorporating styles and ingredients from other continents. Among the heritage ingredients Erdrich explored are mandaamin (corn) and actual wild rice, which the Anishinaabe people call manoomin - a very different creature from the cultivated, hard black rice that bears the name in stores in the area. "The tastes range from astringent and grassy to smoky and nutty," Erdrich explains. Another is Sumac, "a great seasoning or you can make drinks from it – Indian Kool-Aid, they call it. I love it on popcorn. I say in the book to make a seasoning from sumac and maple sugar, put it in a shaker, and use it on everything."

Erdrich also looks at the geo-political context of the ingredients she includes when relevant. The topic of freshwater fish includes a discussion of "shifts in climate and threats to water purity as it reveals the deep relationship between Ojibwe people and indigenous fish species such as Ginoozhii, the Muskie, Ogaa, the Walleye, and Adikamig, Whitefish."

== Format ==
Coming from a family of writers (including her sister, Louise Erdrich - renowned contemporary Native American writer) Heid is primarily a poet. Original Local's chapters are structured by food groups, but within that structure the content is more of a collage. Each recipe's 'headnote' incorporates Heid's poetic writing style, and there are essays, interviews, cooking tips and notes throughout. “Writing about cooking is a lot like poetry to me – interesting and emotional and evocative and condensed. So is cooking itself … themes and carrying certain flavors and matching things together," says Erdrich

== Reception ==
From a Madison, Wisconsin publication, "Poet Heid E. Erdrich does not consider herself a cook or even a foodie, but you wouldn’t know it by the appetizing recipes and edifying tales in her salute to the native foods of the Great Lakes and Great Plains." Oliver Pollack of Mid West Review describes Heid's creations as 'fusion recipes combining local sources and lore, and twenty-first-century palates..'.

In including Original Local in its 2014 10 Best Local Cookbooks and Food Guides list, Minneapolis City Pages called it, "a soulful cookbook for the Midwestern heart."
