= The Sioux Chef's Indigenous Kitchen =

2017 recipe book

- Author: Sean Sherman, Beth Dooley
- Language: English
- Subject: Native American cuisine
- Genre: Cookbook
- Publisher: University of Minnesota Press
- Publication date: October 2017
- Publication place: United States
- Media type: Book
- Pages: 240
- ISBN: 978-0-8166-9979-7 (1ed, hardcover)

The Sioux Chef's Indigenous Kitchen is a recipe book written by Sean Sherman with Beth Dooley, published by the University of Minnesota Press in Minneapolis, Minnesota. Sean Sherman is an Oglala Lakota chef who was born in Pine Ridge, South Dakota, and is currently based in South Minneapolis. Sherman opened an Indigenous cuisine restaurant within the Water Works park development project overlooking Saint Anthony Falls and the Stone Arch Bridge in Minneapolis in 2021.

The cookbook advocates use of Native American cuisine, Indigenous ingredients and ancestral culinary techniques as a way to return to healthy collective eating habits and reduce the incidence of diabetes and other health issues which are endemic on Indian reservations and among Native people.

== Format ==
Recipes are grouped by where the ingredients are obtained, including 'Fields and Gardens', 'Prairies and Lakes' and 'The Indigenous Pantry.' Informative sidebars cover topics ranging from the difference between terminology, to ingredient information, to the noble way to hunt. Commonly-held information such as the Three Sisters ingredients of corn, beans and squash; and the unique, crucial aspects of hominy is enhanced with additional science/cooking/diet aspects based on Sherman's extensive research.

Sherman researched the foods and cooking methods extensively, using published sources as well as personal interviews with family members and others in his tribe in Pine Ridge, and principles of ethnobotany. The food-related disruptions of colonialism – including the additions of white flour, sugar, dairy and fat – are stripped away, replaced by food that utilizes regional ingredients to create an empowering diet.

== Context ==
While the health issues facing Native people are extensively researched solutions are less clear. Many groups have tackled the problems before with limited success, and for some the idea of returning to original eating habits is unrealistic. Nevertheless, the facts speaking to the misfit between government-issued foods and the genetic disposition of Native people, or, indeed anything even remotely resembling a healthy diet for any ethnicity, is clear. The Sioux Chef's Indigenous Kitchen joins a decades-long, growing movement including cookbooks such as Foods of the Americas: Native Recipes and Traditions written by husband/wife team Fernando Divina and Marlene Divina and published by Smithsonian National Museum of the American Indian when it opened in 2004 and Original Local: Indigenous Foods, Stories and Recipes from the Upper Midwest by Heid E. Erdrich in 2013. Other parts of the movement include the 2006 television series called Seasoned With Spirit: A Native Cook’s Journey with Loretta Barrett Oden, organizations like Native Seeds/SEARCH and the International Institute of Indigenous Science-Indigenous Permaculture, health systems focused on Native populations, and various groups focusing on sustainable agriculture such as the USDA and the Land Stewardship Project.

== Reception ==
"There are cookbooks from which one simply cooks the recipes, and cookbooks like Chef Sherman’s, from which one learns how and why to cook," Eric Patterson notes in a positive review, calling the recipes a means to the end of reclaiming the history and culture of indigenous peoples.

Sherman's book–part textbook, part cookbook–tells the story of growing up on the Pine Ridge Reservation in South Dakota. It includes Sherman's dismissal of frybread as simply not good enough, given all that had been part of his people's diets before, and all that is available now–and how people in other parts of the world had retained their original, healthy diets.

The book won a James Beard Award in 2018.
