= Ahtone =

Ahtone is a Kiowa surname. Notable people with the surname include:

- Heather Ahtone, Choctaw/Chickasaw museum curator
- Sharron Ahtone Harjo, Kiowa painter and educator
- Tahnee Ahtoneharjo-Growingthunder, also known as Tahnee Ahtone, Kiowa/ Muscogee/Seminole curator, museum director, and beadwork artist
- Tristan Ahtone, Kiowa journalist
