= Huichun =

Huichun may refer to:

- Huichún, an archaeological site in Peru
- Fai chun, celebratory sayings as Chinese New Year decorations ("Huichun" in Mandarin)
- Hunchun, a city in Jilin province, China often mispronounced as Huichun
- Huichun (also called Xučyun or Huichin), a name for a grouping of people of the Verona Band of Alameda County, California; includes Muwekma and Chochenyo Ohlone tribes; see El Sobrante, Contra Costa County, California § History
  - The ancestral homeland of the aforementioned peoples, including Oakland, California, and the surrounding cities
