= First Americans Museum =

Museum in Oklahoma City

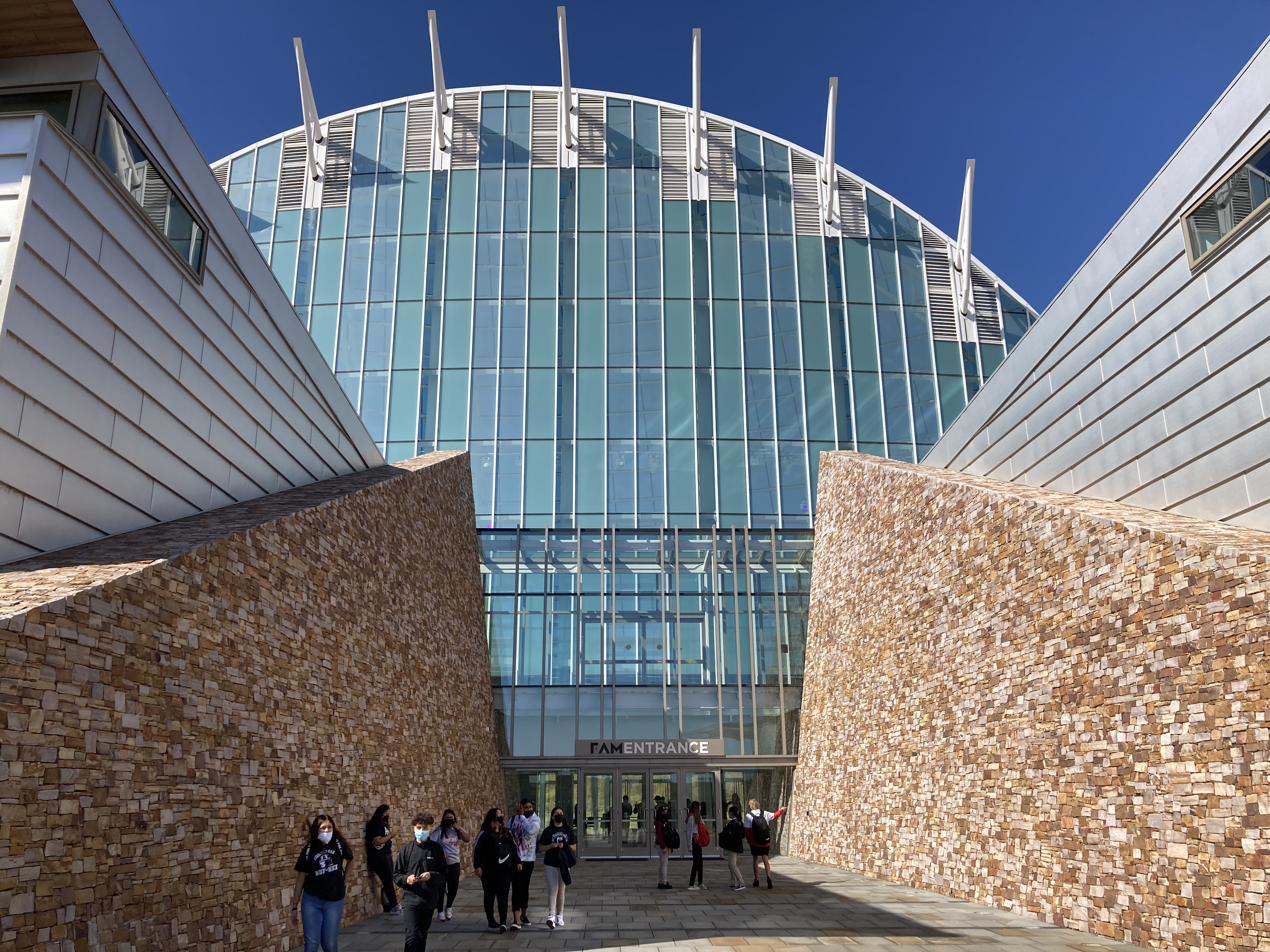
- Former name: American Indian Cultural Center and Museum
- Coordinates: 35.4578°N 97.48123°W
- Type: Cultural
- Visitors: 200,000+ (2022)
- Executive director: Dr. Kelli Mosteller
- Curator: Heather Ahtone
- Website: famok.org

The First Americans Museum (FAM) is a museum in Oklahoma City, Oklahoma, U.S. It was previously known as the American Indian Cultural Center and Museum. It officially opened on September 18, 2021.

== Background ==
The idea for a museum celebrating Oklahoma's Indigenous inhabitants arose from the state's 1989 celebration of the land run. The center was initiated in the 1990s and previously was named the American Indian Cultural Center and Museum. Construction began in 2006, was interrupted in 2012 when state funding ran out, but resumed in 2019, after the responsibility for the museum was transferred from the State of Oklahoma to Oklahoma City along with financial assistance from a Chickasaw Nation subsidiary, the American Indian Cultural Center Foundation, and numerous donors.

== Mission ==
The mission of First Americans Museum is, "To serve as a dynamic center promoting awareness and educating the broader public about the unique cultures, diversity, history, contributions, and resilience of the First American Nations in Oklahoma today."

== Staff ==
As of July 2024, Dr. Kelli Mosteller (Citizen Potawatomi Nation) is the new Executive Director and CEO, replacing James Pepper Henry (Kaw/Muscogee). Deputy director is Shoshana Wasserman (Thlopthlocco Muscogee). Chief curator is Heather Ahtone (Choctaw/Chickasaw). Loretta Barrett Oden (Potawatomi) is a culinary architect in the museum's on-site Thirty Nine Restaurant. Greg Wadley (Choctaw Nation) is chair of the FAM Board of Directors.

== Building and campus ==
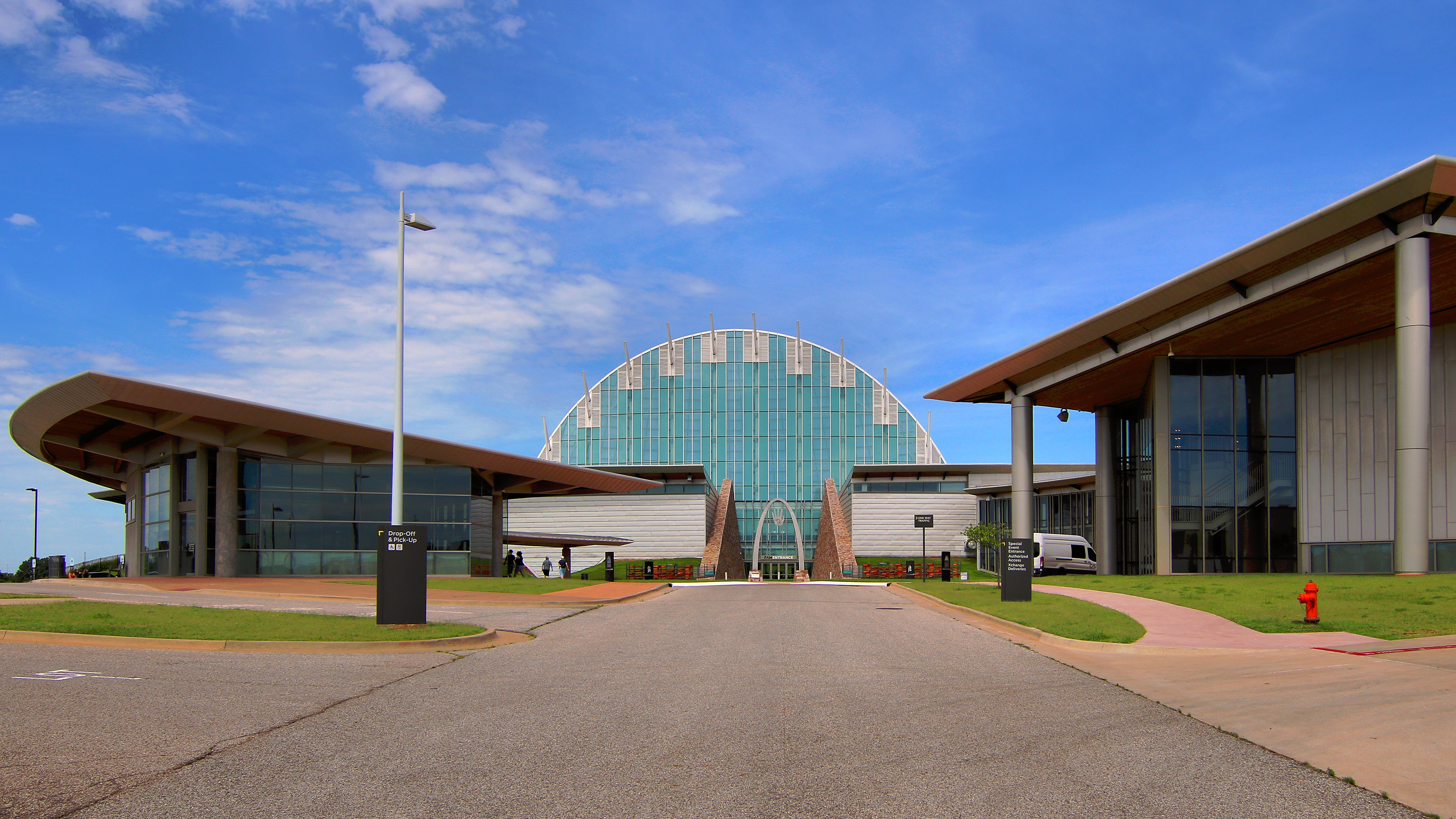
First Americans Museum Campus

The 12,000 square foot museum was designed by Johnson Fain Architects and Hornbeek, Blatt Architects, Co-Prime, Edmond. Visitors are greeted by the Remembrance Gate consisting of two inclining 40-foot walls of Mesquabuck stone. The name of the Potawatomi Chief Mes'kwah-buk, "whose name signifies the color of the sky at sunrise and sunset" is inscribed into the stone face. Visitors then enter The Hall of People, which takes inspiration from the traditional Wichita Grasshouse that were the original inhabitants of the area. The massive glass semi-dome is supported by ten columns of various stones. Each column represents the ten miles traveled each day by Indigenous people during forced removal to Indian Territory, while the variation in stone represents the distinction of tribal groups that came to the area. Behind the museum is a semi-circular earthen mound which pays tribute to the great mound-builder civilizations. The sunken area within the mound serves as an outdoor Festival Grounds.

=== Permanent exhibits ===
FAM maintains two permanent galleries alongside a temporary exhibition space.

The first-floor gallery, OKLA HOMMA, chronicles the histories of the 39 federally recognized tribes of Oklahoma, beginning with creation stories to the violent removal of Natives by Europeans and the United States, to present day issues and life ways. The gallery makes use of animation, audio recordings, interactive technology, contemporary artworks, and artifact displays.

The second-floor gallery, WINIKO: Life of an Object, is the product of a two-year (2023-2025) project between FAM and the National Museum of the American Indian with the goal of repatriating objects to hundreds of descendent families and community members. The resulting exhibit features 76 objects from the collections of 19th century archaeologist Mark R. Harrington on loan from the NMAI alongside commissioned works of art. The exhibit was co-curated by Dr. heather ahtone (Senior Curator) and Welana Queton (Curatorial Specialist), with assistance by Hallie Winter (Collections Manager) and Erin Minnaugh (NMAI registration technician) and consultation from representatives from the 39 tribes and Knowledge Keepers.

== Awards and recognitions ==
- 2024 The American Alliance of Museums Advancement of Diversity, Equity, Accessibility, and Inclusion in Museums Award
- 2024 National Endowment for the Arts Grant Recipient for its reunification work WINIKO: Life of an Object
- 2023 GOOD DESIGN award by the Chicago Athenaeum Museum of Architecture and Design and the European Centre for Architecture Art Design and Urban Studies
- 2023 Winner of the Urban Land Institute (ULI) National Award for Best Public Facility
- 2023 Oklahoma Nonprofit Excellence (ONE) Award for Best Arts & Humanities Organization
- 2023 American Association for State & Local History (AASLH) Award of Excellence & History In Progress Award
- 2022 Engineering News Record (ENR) Award of Excellence for Best Public Facility in the United States
- 2022 Oklahoma RedBud Award for Outstanding New Attraction
- 2022 EPA Region 6 Award and National Phoenix Award for Best Brownfield Project
- 2022 Oklahoma Museums Association Outstanding Exhibit Award for "Okla Homma" and Outstanding Publication Award for "WINIKO: Life of an Object"
- 2022 Anthem Gold Award for the exhibition "Okla Homma"
- 2022 Winner of the Urban Land Institute (ULI) Philanthropic Vision Award

== See also ==
- Center of the American Indian, Native-American led intertribal museum in Oklahoma City, active from 1978 to 1992
