= Vincent Medina =

Ohlone chef

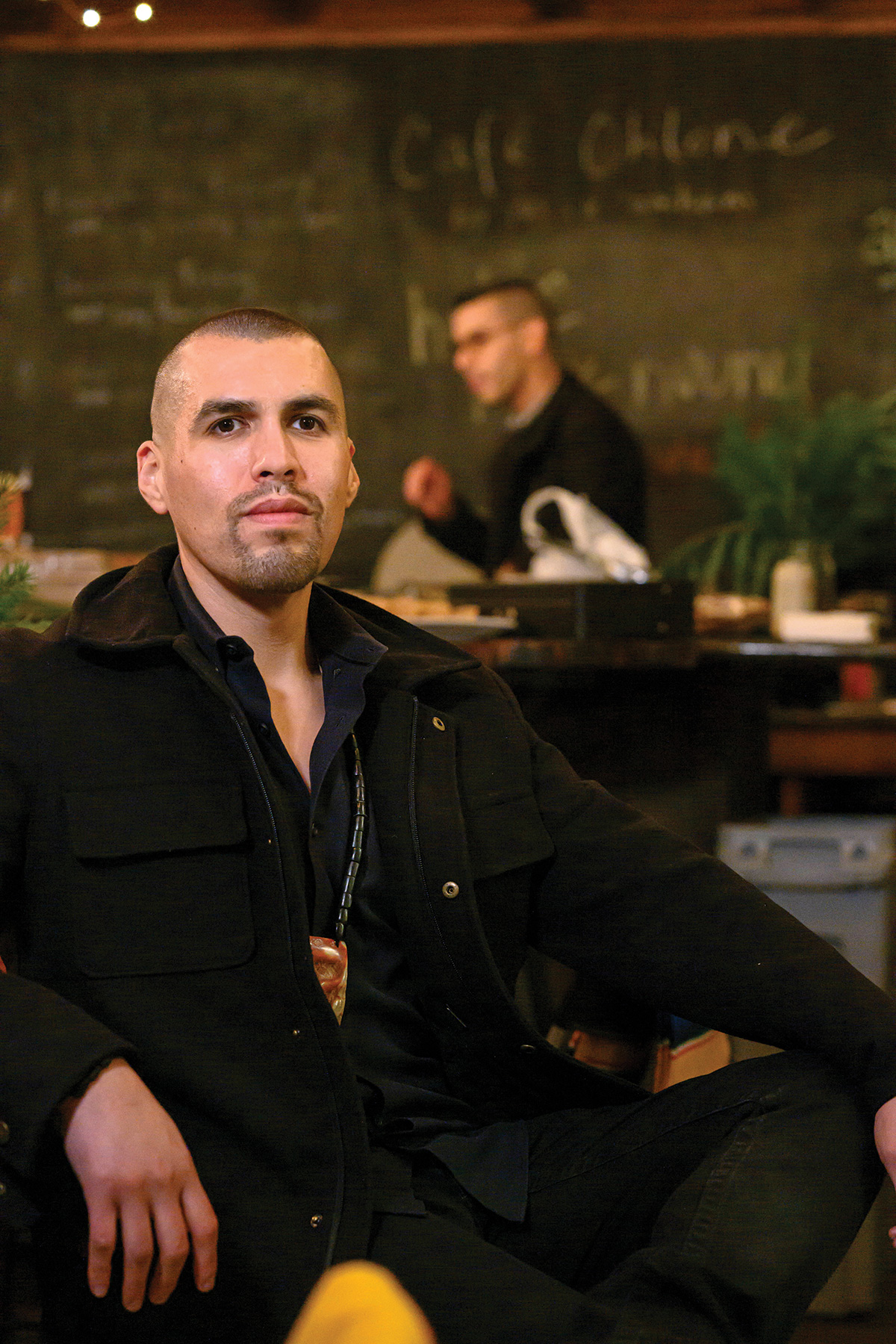
- Vincent Medina at Cafe Ohlone in Berkeley
- Born: Bay Area, California, US
- Culinary career
- Cooking style: Ohlone cuisine
- Current restaurant
- Cafe Ohlone
- Website: makamham.com

Vincent Medina (born October 6, 1986) is an indigenous rights, indigenous language, and food activist from California. He co-founded Cafe Ohlone, an Ohlone restaurant in Berkeley, California which serves Indigenous cuisine made with Native ingredients sourced from the San Francisco and Monterey Bay Areas. As of 2019 he was serving on the Muwekma council, and he is Capitán, or cultural leader, of the ‘Itmay Cultural Association.

He is a Chochenyo Ohlone member of the Muwekma Ohlone Tribe.

Medina is also a board member of Advocates for Indigenous California Language Survival. Medina speaks English, Spanish, and Chochenyo.

== Family and early life ==
Medina is the great-grandson of María Archuleta, nephew of Dolores Lameira Galvan, and cousin of Andrew Galvan. He attended Muwekma Ohlone tribal classes and campouts as a child. He also attended public school. He has a younger brother.

== Career ==
Medina was the assistant curator and a docent for seven years at Mission Dolores in San Francisco.

Starting in 2011, he wrote a blog about his experiences as a 21st-century Ohlone person and learning and sharing the Chochenyo language. He wrote a column, "In Our Languages" in News from Native California dedicated to writing in Indigenous California languages. News from Native California is published by the nonprofit Heyday, where Medina has been the Berkeley Roundhouse Outreach Coordinator since 2013. Heyday's Berkeley Roundhouse, formerly called the California Indian Publishing Program, celebrates Indigenous California cultures and support the local Indian community.

Medina has served on the board of directors of Advocates for Indigenous California Language Survival since 2012. He co-founded Cafe Ohlone in 2018. He is also one of a few rotating hosts of Bay Native Circle, a weekly indigenous radio program and podcast which airs on KPFA.

== Chochenyo language ==
Medina was introduced to Chochenyo as a child but began learning the language deeply around 2010 by studying the field notes produced by J. P. Harrington, who worked with early 20th-century Chochenyo speakers. Medina has participated in Breath of Life. By 2012 he could speak Chochenyo with others, and as he became more proficient, he began teaching his younger brother their ancestors' language as well.

Medina and the Muwekma Ohlone Tribe consider the Chochenyo language to be a distinct language, not just an Ohlone dialect.

In 1934, the only first language speaker of Chochenyo died, but in the 2000s the Muwekma Ohlone Tribe and linguists at UC Berkeley began to learn and revitalize the language, and in 2009 SIL International reclassified Northern Ohlone from "extinct" to "living".

After hearing Medina speak at Mission Dolores in 2012, a journalist wrote: "Chochenyo is full of both harsh guttural sounds and soft tones, like velvet sandpaper. There is nothing like it."

Medina wrote the "In Our Languages" column of News from Native California and wrote the first piece in Chochenyo in that publication in 2014. He has spoken at a number of libraries, museums, and conferences about Chochenyo and Indigenous issues. In 2015 he was chosen to read verses in Chochenyo during the Catholic Mass at the canonization ceremony for Father Serra, and he took advantage of the opportunity which would mean hundreds of millions of people hearing the language.

In 2020, when Cafe Ohlone was closed, Medina and Louis Trevino began hosting weekly Chochenyo and Rumsen language classes online.

Between 2020 and 2023, Medina and Trevino collaborated on the Exploratorium's ¡Plantásticas! exhibition, contributing traditional ecological knowledge passed down to them by Ohlone elders. Labels at the exhibition are trilingual in Spanish, English, and Chochenyo, and Chochenyo advertisements appeared in the San Francisco Chronicle, San Francisco magazine, and on BART public transportation. The exhibition was open through September 24, 2023.

== Ohlone cuisine ==
In 2018, Medina co-founded Cafe Ohlone (Chochenyo: mak-'amham, 'our food') with his Rumsen partner Louis Trevino. It was originally a pop-up restaurant located at the University Press Books bookstore in Berkeley. The menu changes seasonally, and ingredients are gathered by Native people around Ohlone territory. Dishes include acorn soup and acorn bread, watercress and sorrel salad with berries and seeds, quail eggs, venison, chia pudding, and a variety of teas. Meals are accompanied by information about Ohlone history and culture, and sometimes songs.

During the COVID-19 pandemic, University Press Books permanently closed, and Cafe Ohlone began offering foot-square wooden takeout boxes in lieu of communal dining. On Sunday, August 14, 2022, Cafe Ohlone held a one-time tasting event in Pacifica. After multiple reschedulings, Cafe Ohlone reopened in late 2022 at the Phoebe A. Hearst Museum of Anthropology at UC Berkeley. Upon reopening, Cafe Ohlone served tea on Wednesdays, lunch on Thursdays, and brunch on Sundays, with dinner beginning in October.

The café in its new location was dubbed ‘oṭṭoy, meaning "repair", "mend", or "healing" in Chochenyo, referring to the relationship between Ohlone people and the Hearst Museum. The museum houses human remains and cultural objects looted from Ohlone shellmounds, which it has stated that it intends to return to Ohlone people. However, the museum director Lauren Kroiz claims that NAGPRA prevents the museum from returning remains and artifacts. Medina said that Cafe Ohlone at the Hearst Museum "could be a model for other campuses across California and the country."
