= Loretta Barrett Oden =

Potawatomi chef and food writer from Oklahoma, U.S.

- Born: Shawnee, Oklahoma, U.S.
- Citizenship: Citizen Potawatomi Nation, American
- Occupations: Chef, Native foods historian, writer, television show host
- Known for: Indigenous food sovereignty
- Notable work: Corn Dance: Inspired First American Cuisine
- Awards: New England Emmy

Loretta Barrett Oden is a Native American chef, Native foods historian, food writer, and television show host. She is an enrolled citizen of the Citizen Potawatomi Nation. She wrote and hosted the PBS series Seasoned With Spirit: A Native Cook's Journey. Oden writes a column, Spirit of the Harvest, for Native Peoples Magazine.

== Early life ==
Oden was born in Shawnee, Oklahoma. She is a member of the Citizen Potawatomi Nation.

== Career ==
Oden spent three years traveling around the United States learning recipes from many different Native American tribes.

In the early 1990s, when she was 50 years old, Oden opened a restaurant, Corn Dance Café in Santa Fe, New Mexico, with her son Clayton. The dishes were inspired by the many tribal traditions she learned in her travels. The restaurant closed in 2003.

She returned to Oklahoma in 2003.

Oden is a Native foods historian, food writer, and television show host. She is the chef consultant of the First Americans Museum in Oklahoma City, Oklahoma, including 39 Restaurant which opened in 2021. She is working with AARP on an elder meals program, Native Origins.

Oden wrote and hosted the PBS series Seasoned With Spirit: A Native Cook's Journey for which she won a New England Emmy.

She is a founding council member of the not-for-profit organization, Native American Food Sovereignty Alliance, for the food security of Native peoples; that they can continue to produce their own food in traditional ways.

Oden writes a column, Spirit of the Harvest, for Native Peoples Magazine.

In 2023, her cookbook, Corn Dance: Inspired First American Cuisine, was published.

Other Indigenous chefs, including Sean Sherman (Lakota) and Crystal Wahpepah (Kickapoo), cite Oden as a teacher and role model.

== Personal life ==
Oden was first married to Jerry Vandegrift, whose father started Van's Pig Stand, Oklahoma’s oldest single family owned barbecue restaurant.

She has two sons and two stepdaughters from her second marriage.
