= Indigenous cuisine =

Indigenous cuisine is a type of cuisine that is based on the preparation of cooking recipes with products obtained from native species of a specific area.

Indigenous cuisine is prepared using indigenous ingredients of vegetable or animal origin in traditional recipes of the typical cuisine of a place.

Contemporary indigenous cuisine uses indigenous products to create new dishes.

Chefs and restaurateurs using indigenous foods are aided by farmers who are reviving traditional varieties and breeds.

== Defining terms ==
David Cook has asked how "indigenous cooking" can be defined, arguing that it can mean anything from techniques to ingredients, and that the ingredients can be further argued as using only pre-colonial ingredients vs. using post-colonial and invasive-species ingredients, concluding that "it all depends on your concept of [indigenous] identity."

== By country ==
=== Australia ===
In Australia, there are chefs both "sticking to the old recipes (and) innovating new ones" using traditional ingredients.

=== Canada ===
In Canada, multiple restaurants owned by First Nations restaurateurs offer menus based on traditional ingredients such as beans, corn, and squash. According to restaurateur, Shawn Adler, one of the challenges is public awareness. "People understand what Thai food is, what Italian food is, what Chinese food is, what Ethiopian food is," he said. "But people don’t really understand what indigenous cuisine is."

=== Caribbean ===
The concept was also used in the Caribbean.

=== Chile ===
The concept as such began to take shape and gain popularity in Chile at the beginning of the 2010s, when a restaurant dedicated to this style of cuisine in Santiago de Chile appeared in the ranking of the World's 50 Best Restaurants in 2014.

=== El Salvador ===
In El Salvador indigenous cuisine is an "emerging movement...composed of young chefs who are integrating traditional foods into contemporary cuisine", according to NPR. Fatima Mirandel said, "We take old ingredients from the [farming areas] and combine them in new ways. The flavor is new and exciting for our generation, and brings back a flood of good memories for the older people."

=== United States ===
Some US Native American chefs using indigenous ingredients in traditional dishes object to referring to indigenous cuisine as a "trend". Sean Sherman, a member of the Oglala Lakota and indigenous food activist, said, "It's not a trend. It's a way of life."

Vincent Medina, a member of the Muwekma Ohlone tribe, serves acorn-flour brownies, a non-traditional dish made with indigenous ingredients, at his Cafe Ohlone by Mak-’amham.

== See also ==
- Traditional food
- List of food origins
