= Owamni =

Restaurant in Minneapolis, Minnesota, U.S.

Owamni by the Sioux Chef

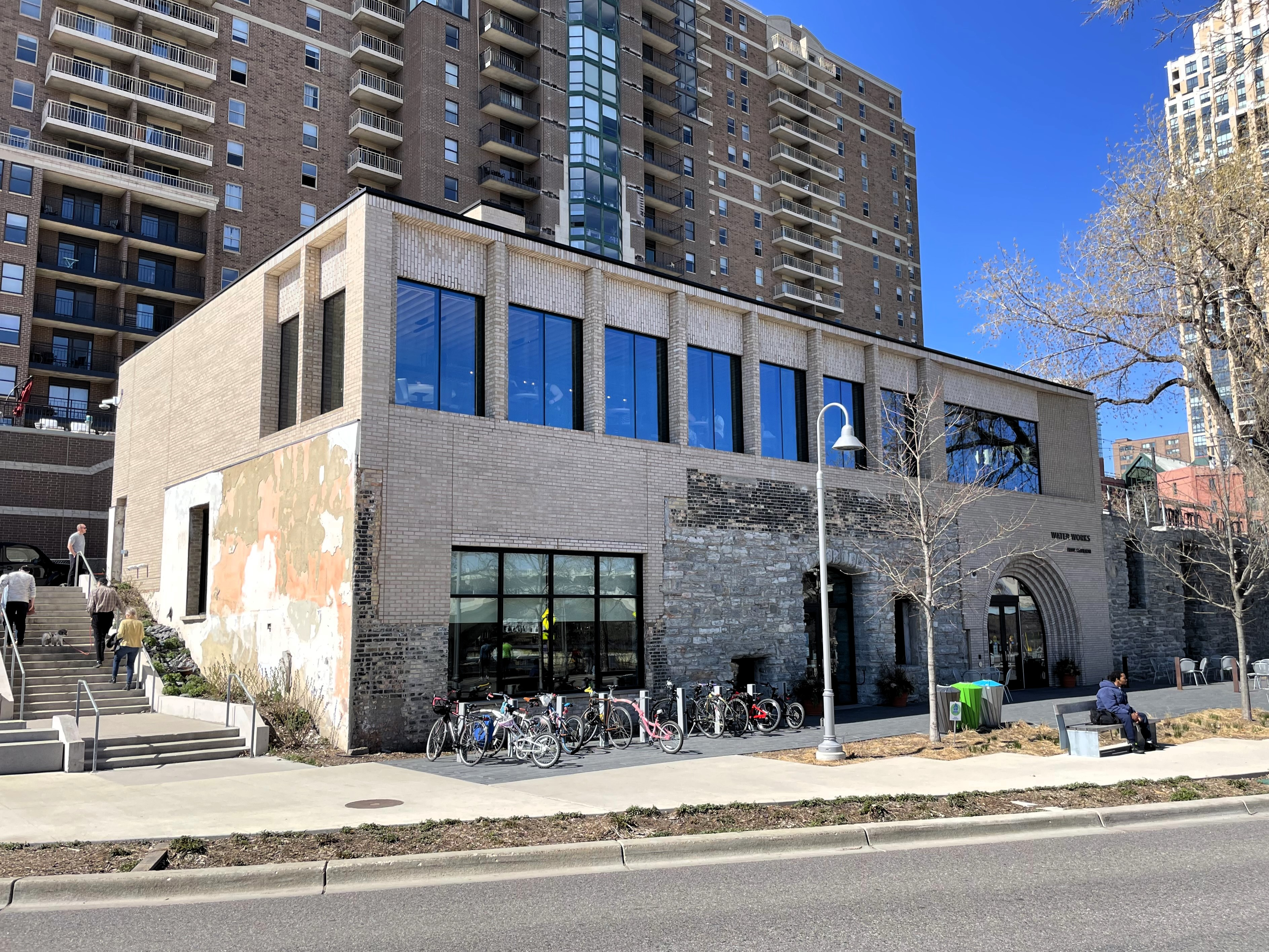
- Interactive map of Owamni by the Sioux Chef

Restaurant information
- Established: July 19, 2021
- Owner: North American Traditional Indigenous Food Systems (NATIFS)
- Chef: Sean Sherman
- Food type: Native American
- Location: 420 South 1st Street, Minneapolis, Minnesota, 55401, United States
- Coordinates: 44°58′52″N 93°15′37″W
- Website: owamni.com

Owamni by the Sioux Chef, or simply Owamni, is a Native American restaurant in downtown Minneapolis, Minnesota, that overlooks the Mississippi River. Owamni's majority Native American staff serves a menu made from indigenous ingredients such as game meats, corn, and wild plants. The restaurant does not serve ingredients that were introduced to the region by Europeans, including butter, dairy, sugar, black pepper, wheat, chicken, beef, and pork.

As of 2023, the restaurant is run as a not-for-profit.

== Description and history ==
Owamni opened on July 19, 2021. It is located in Mill Ruins Park, near Saint Anthony Falls. The name Owamni derives from the Dakota name Owámniyomni for St. Anthony Falls, which roughly translates to "place of the falling, swirling water". The Minneapolis Park and Recreation Board and Parks Foundation raised money to honor the indigenous heritage of the falls. They cooperated with architects Hammel, Green, and Abrahamson to build the restaurant Owamni on the second floor of the nineteenth century Columbia flour mill. A red neon sign inside the restaurant says, "You Are on Native Land".

The restaurant was originally co-owned by Dana Thompson and Sean Sherman, a member of the Oglala Lakota Sioux tribe who is also the head chef. Nearly two-thirds of the 70 staff members are Native American, representing several tribes: Anishinaabe, Mdewakanton and Wahpeton-Sisseton Dakota, Navajo, Northern Cheyenne, and Oglala Lakota. In 2023 the nonprofit North American Traditional Indigenous Food Systems (NATIFS) acquired the restaurant to be run as a not-for-profit.

=== Menu ===
Some of the dishes served include amaranth tostadas with dip made from tepary beans and smoked trout, a crispy cricket seed mix with chili and maple, and bison tartare garnished with wasna and curled crackers made of wild rice and corn's ancestor, teosinte. Also served are sandwiches—arepas heaped with ground elk, sweet potatoes, and pepitas, or, turkey, or, the three sisters: black bean pureé, pickled squash, and corn. Wojabe, a foraged berry sauce traditionally made with chokeberries, tops both sweet desserts and savory dishes.

The restaurant "breaks its decolonized rule with beverages" by serving coffee, indigenous wine, and alcohol-free cocktails. Beer comes from breweries owned by women and BIPOC (Black, Indigenous, people of color) individuals.

== Reception ==
On opening, recognition came from local, national, and international reviewers. Less than one year after opening, Owamni won the James Beard Foundation Award for best new restaurant in 2022.

== Gallery ==
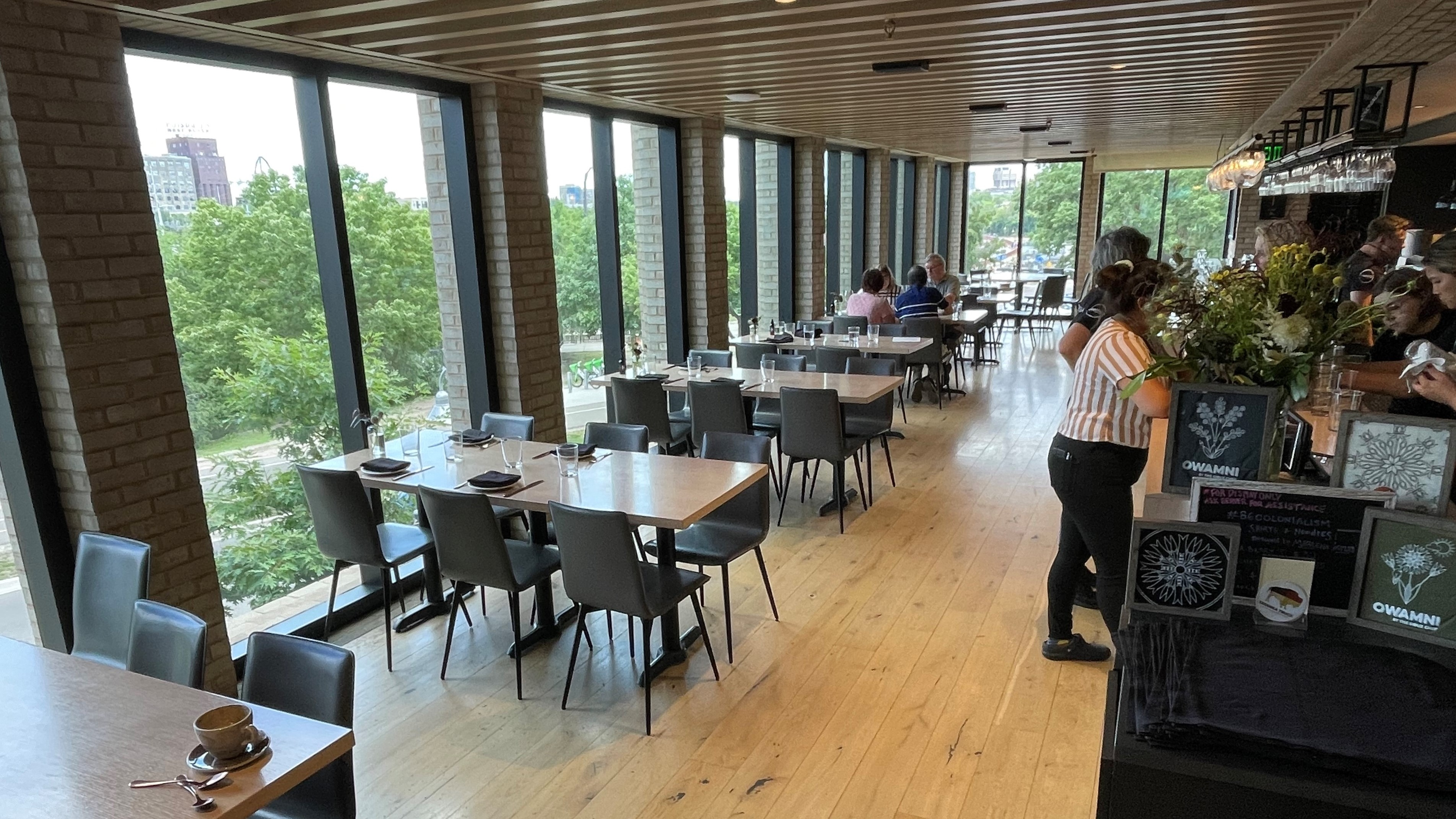
Main dining room in Owamni, with views of the Mississippi River and Pillsbury A-Mill

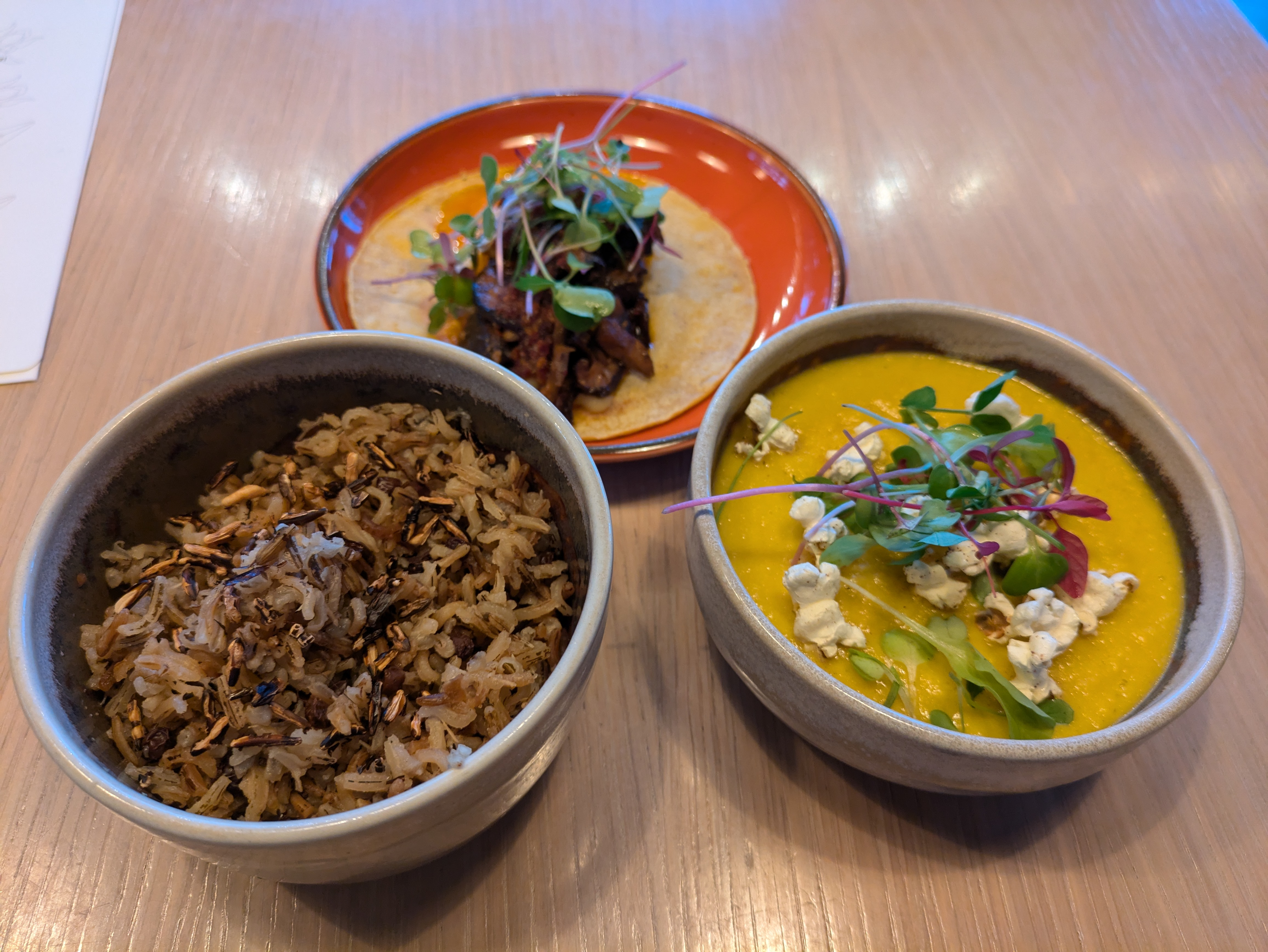
Food served at Owamni
