= Indigenous Food Lab =

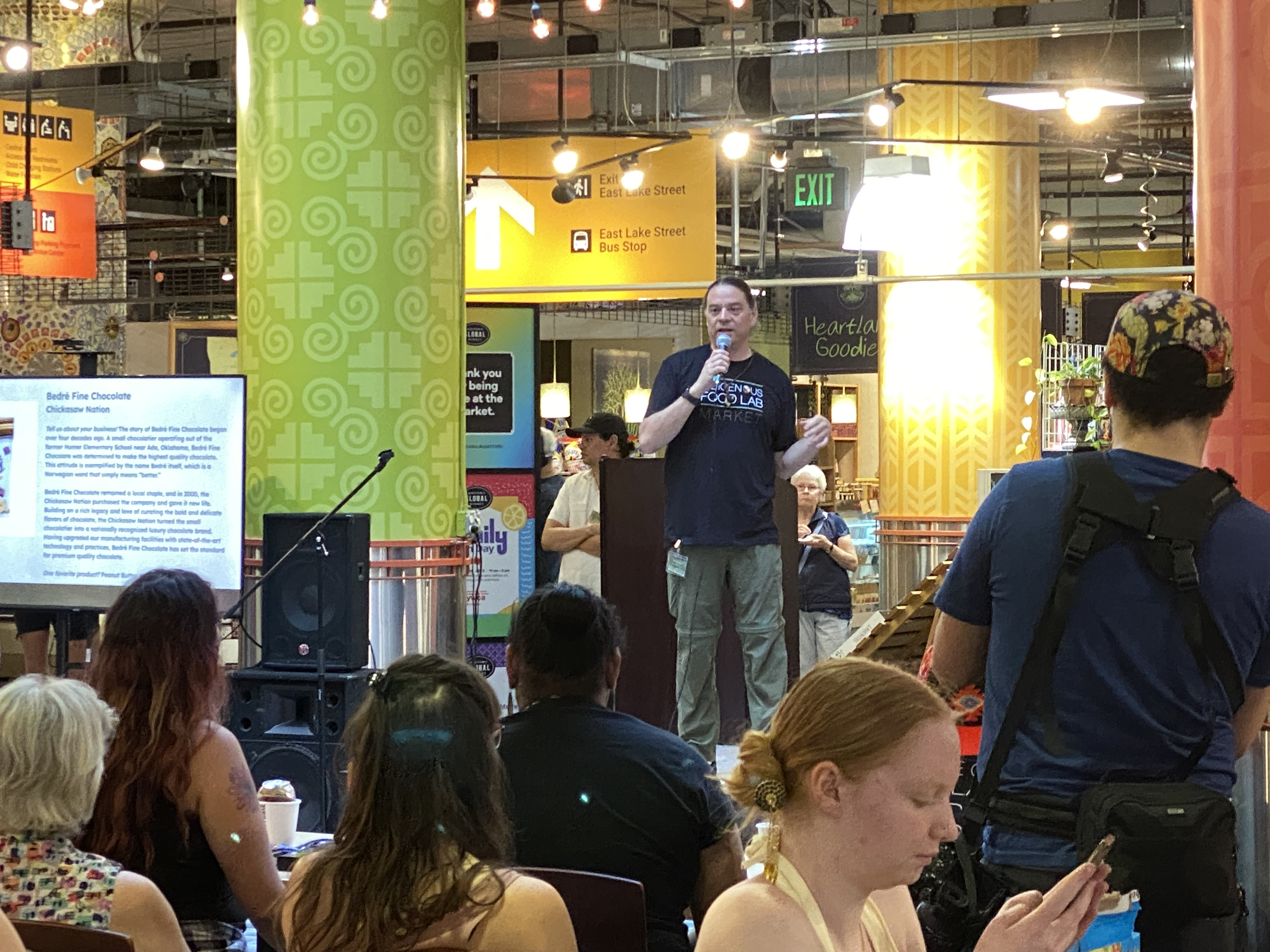
- Indigenous Food Lab, Grand Opening
- Founded: 2020
- Founder: Sean Sherman
- Type: Nonprofit
- Locations: Minneapolis, Minnesota; Montana State University

The Indigenous Food Lab is a project of the nonprofit North American Traditional Indigenous Food Systems (NATIFS), established in 2020 in Minneapolis, Minnesota. It was founded by Oglala Lakota Sioux chef Sean Sherman.

The Indigenous Food Lab serves as a hub for culinary education, agricultural practices, seed saving, and cultural programming, supporting Indigenous tribal communities in developing food enterprises and promoting food sovereignty. The organization is focused on the revitalization of pre-colonial American cuisine.

== History ==
The Indigenous Food Lab is a project of the nonprofit North American Traditional Indigenous Food Systems (NATIFS) that was established in 2020 in Minneapolis, Minnesota. It was founded to aid in creating Indigenous-controlled food systems and address a lack of Native American cuisine representation in urban centers. Their main facility was designed to serve as a learning hub for Indigenous agriculture, seed saving, ethnobotany, outdoor/indoor cooking techniques, and food preservation.

The organization was founded by Oglala Lakota Sioux chef Sean Sherman. It operates as an Indigenous test kitchen, education and training center focusing on cultural and nutritional revitalization through pre-colonial American cuisine. The organization is the first Indigenous food lab in the United States. The project focuses on cuisine from the Midwest, and Indigenous food traditions from across North America, spanning the Southwest to Alaska and Mexico.

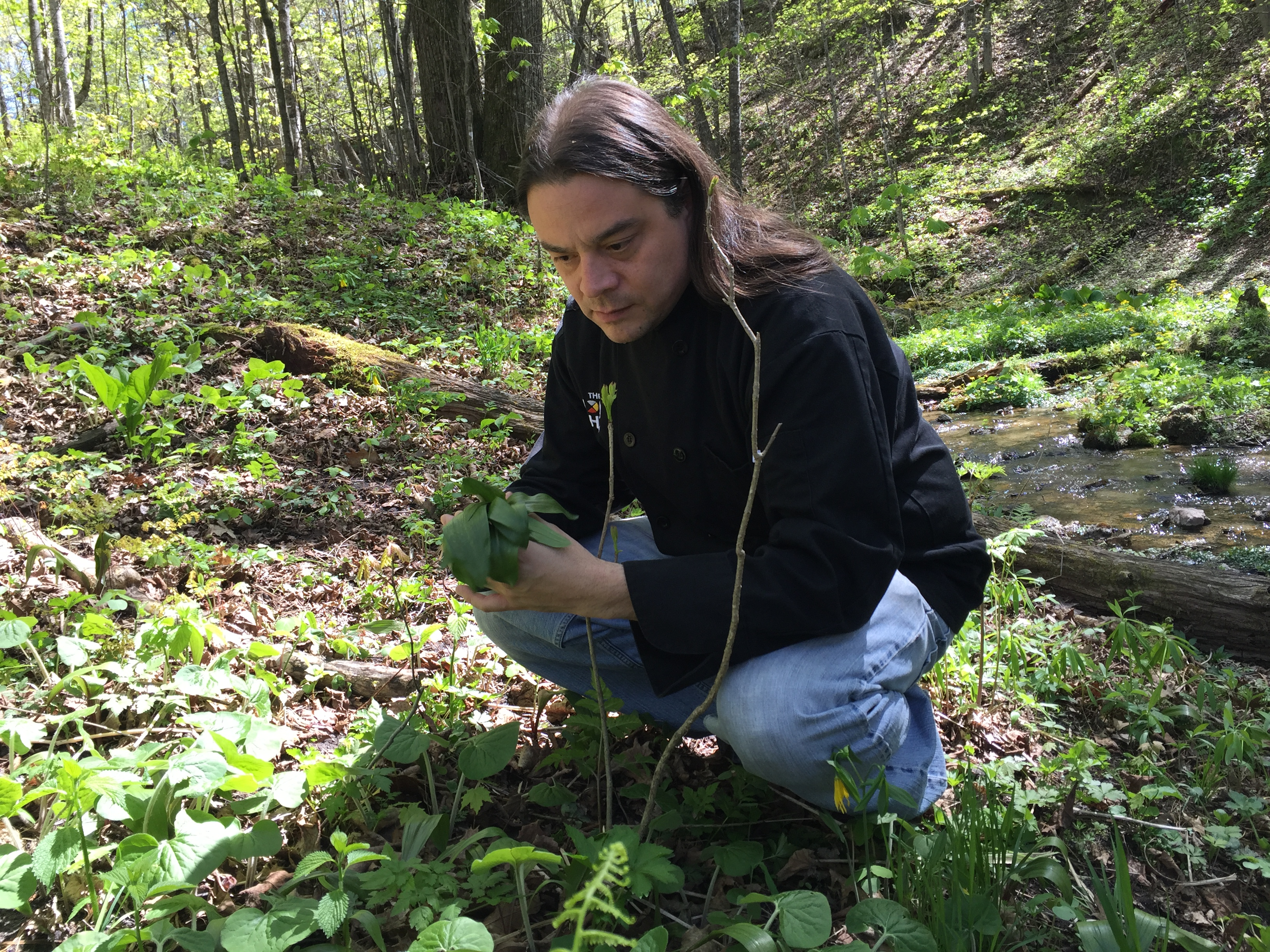
Founder Sean Sherman foraging Wild Ramps

Indigenous Food Lab's location at the Minneapolis's Midtown Global Market was opened in June 2023, and contained a restaurant, retail space, and community food education facilities. Sherman was also named one of Time's 100 Most Influential People in 2023.

Montana State University houses the second location of the Indigenous Food Lab, as of 2023. This location has a $29 million facility with a "state-of-the-art" kitchen. The Montana facility focuses on recipe development, cooking workshops, feeding Native American students, and producing educational cooking videos for social media.

=== Culinary ethos ===
The Indigenous Food Lab solely utilizes ingredients indigenous to the Americas, sourcing products such as bison from South Dakota's Cheyenne River Buffalo Company, corn from New Mexico's Ute Mountain region, and wild rice from Minnesota's Red Lake Nation. It explicitly excludes post-colonial ingredients including pork, chicken, beef, dairy, and wheat, emphasizing unprocessed, additive-free foods. The organization maintains a market selling tribal community products and offers educational programming through Indigenous cooking classes.

=== COVID-19 pandemic ===
Sherman envisioned expanding the model across North America, aiming to represent local Indigenous food cultures from every region in the Americas. They wanted to offer cultural programming such as pottery and language classes, though plans were affected by the COVID-19 pandemic. While initially planned for in-person instruction, the pandemic led to a shift toward online education during that time.

=== Events ===
The Indigenous Food Lab participated in the 2024 Minnesota State Fair with menus including, bison meatballs incorporating wild rice and cranberries with wóžapi sauce, and sweet potato dumplings topped with a seed mix. These items were accompanied by their Nixtamal bowls. The menu also featured an optional garnish of sumac and chili-seasoned crickets.
