= Heather Ahtone =

American academic

Director of Curatorial Affairs for the First Americans Museum
- Incumbent
- Assumed office 2018

Personal details
- Education: Institute of American Indian Arts (AA); University of Oklahoma (BFA/MA/PhD)

Heather Ahtone is an American academic and the director of Curatorial Affairs at the First Americans Museum.

== Background and education ==
Ahtone is enrolled in the Chickasaw Nation and a descendant of the Choctaw Nation of Oklahoma. She received an associate degree from the Institute of American Indian Arts (IAIA) in 1993 and her master's degree (2006) and doctoral degree from the University of Oklahoma (OU).

== Career ==
Ahtone previously worked at the Institute of American Indian Arts (IAIA) and the Southwestern Association for Indian Arts (SWAIA).

In 2007, she began researching at the University of Oklahoma School of Geology and Geophysics while teaching courses in Art History in Norman, Oklahoma. She served as the James T. Bialac Curator of Native American and Non-Western Art at the Fred Jones Jr. Museum of Art, part of OU, from 2012 to 2018.

She became the senior curator at the First Americans Museum in Oklahoma City, Oklahoma, in 2018. Involved with the museum's planning, Ahtone is responsible for creating exhibitions for the museum, managing publications, and coordinating research.

== Writing ==
Ahtone has published in journals such as American Indian Horizons, International Journal of Arts in Society, and Wíčazo Ša Review. She has authored and contributed to catalogues, ‘’OKLA HOMMA’’, ‘’WINIKO: Life of an Object, Selections from the Smithsonian’s National Museum of the American Indian’’, Warhol and the West, Crow's Shadow Institute of the Arts at 25, Hopituy: Hopi Art from the Permanent Collections, From the belly of our being: Art by and about Native Creation, Seeds of Being: A Project of the Andrew W. Mellon Foundation Native American Art & Museum Studies Seminar, and many more.

== Awards and honors ==
In 2007, Oklahoma Magazine named Ahtone a "40 Under 40."

== Select exhibitions curated ==
- 2020: Re/Convening: Native Arts of Oklahoma, Hardesty Arts Center (AHHA), Tulsa, Oklahoma
- 2017: Photo/Synthesis with Will Wilson, Fred Jones Jr. Museum of Art
- 2016: From the belly of our being art by and about Native creation, Oklahoma State University Museum of Art, Stillwater, OK
- 2015: Enter the Matrix: Indigenous Printmakers, Fred Jones Jr. Museum of Art
- 2013: Hopituy: Hopi Art from the Permanent Collection, Fred Jones Jr. Museum of Art
- 2012: James T. Bialac Native American Art Collection: Selected Works, Fred Jones Jr. Museum of Art

== See also ==
- James Pepper Henry
