= Louis Trevino =

Ohlone chef

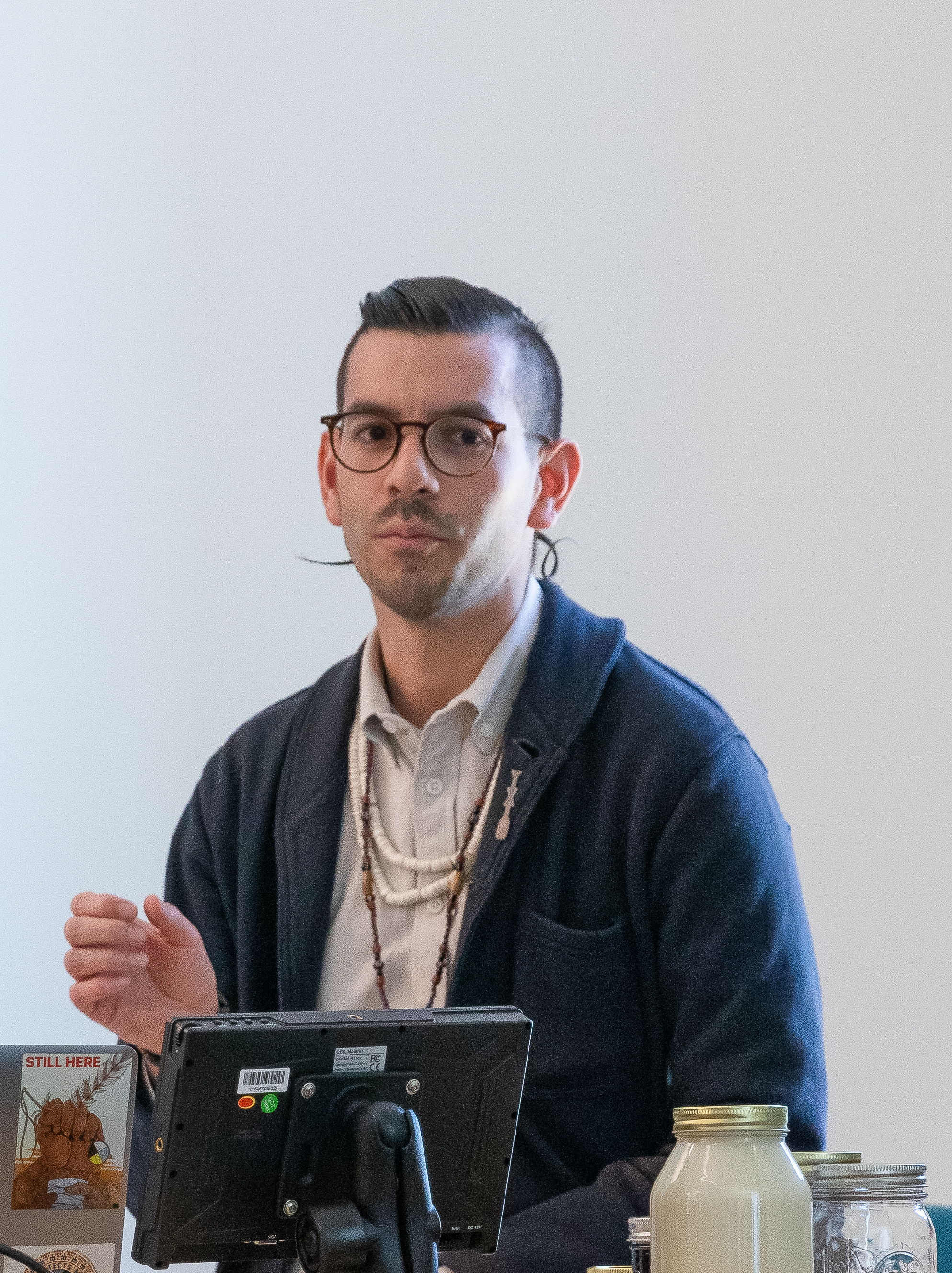
- Trevino teaching at UC Davis
- Born: 1991
- Education: UC Berkeley
- Culinary career
- Cooking style: Ohlone cuisine
- Current restaurant(s): Cafe Ohlone
- Television show(s): Tending Nature
- Award(s) won: James Beard Foundation Award semi-finalist

Louis Trevino (born 1991) is an American Rumsen Ohlone chef and co-founder of Cafe Ohlone. Raised in the Los Angeles area, Trevino attended UC Berkeley. He met his future partner, Vincent Medina, at an Indigenous languages conference in 2014.

== Personal life ==
As a child, Trevino's family owned a Mexican restaurant in Chino Hills, California.

== Cafe Ohlone ==
In 2018, Trevino and Medina founded California's first Indigenous restaurant as a pop-up in the courtyard of the University Press Bookstore in Berkeley.

In a 2019 interview with KQED, Trevino noted that his work at Cafe Ohlone highlighted the legacy of colonialism in California, stating, "We’re making people responsible for what they know, where they live, and what they’re implicated in by their presence here."

Due to the COVID-19 pandemic, the University Press Bookstore closed in 2020, and Cafe Ohlone transitioned to a monthly meal kit program. In 2021, Cafe Ohlone re-opened as oṭṭoy at the Hearst Museum of Anthropology at UC Berkeley. Trevino was a semi-finalist for a James Beard Foundation Award for Best Emerging Chef in 2023.

== Teaching ==
Trevino has introduced Ohlone cuisine through teaching and guest lecturing in a food engineering course at UC Davis in 2022. That same year, he gave a lecture at the Pacifica Coastside Museum in Pacifica on the history of the California genocide, followed by an Ohlone meal.

== Revitalization ==
Trevino is involved in the revitalization of the Rumsen language and teaches it through mak-‘amham, an Ohlone cultural organization he co-founded with Medina in 2017. Trevino stated to Slow Food that his goal is to uplift future generations of Ohlone youth, saying, "Moving forward, young people today and in the future will be empowered to continue the work of revitalization until our culture is as elevated and celebrated as any other." Departures Magazine noted that Trevino's work goes "beyond revival" by reflecting "the vibrant, living, evolving Ohlone culture that is here now, that has been here for centuries."
