= Verona Band of Alameda County =

The Verona Band of Alameda County, also known as the Pleasanton Rancheria, was a band of Ohlone people in Alameda County, California. Federally recognized in the early 20th century, they lost their recognition, and descendants of Verona Band members today remain unrecognized legally; some are members of unrecognized organized groups, most notably the Muwekma Ohlone Tribe.

== History ==
The ancestors of the Verona Band were the various Ohlone peoples from what is now Contra Costa County and Alameda County in California. Starting in the 1790s, those people began to live in Mission San José in modern-day Fremont, California.

After the missions were secularized in 1835, the Ohlone continued to live in the area. Many of them lived in Sunol and neighboring Pleasanton. Some of them were displaced by George Hearst's building of his mansion at Sunol. Known as the Verona Mansion, his mansion provided this band with its name.

In 1906, it was discovered that there were 18 unratified treaties with Indigenous peoples of California. The U.S. federal government decided to try to provide recognition to these groups, including the Verona Band of Alameda County.

In 1906, Congress passed a bill to provide funds to purchase land for this band's use. The money appropriated was not enough to purchase a suitable tract of land. Lafayette A. Dorrington, the Indian commissioner for the Sacramento Indian Agency in 1928, decided, instead of sending Congress a list of the Verona Band and 133 other California bands that had not yet received land grants, that he would just drop their 134 groups from being federally recognized.

== Contemporary descendants ==
The Muwekma Ohlone Tribe, formerly known as the Ohlone/Costanoan Muwekma Tribe, applied for federal recognition; however, their petition was denied in 2002. The US Department of the Interior Bureau of Indian Affairs found a lack of "evidence since 1927 of substantially continuous external identification of the petitioning group as a continuation of the historical 'Verona Band' or Pleasanton rancheria." The final determination also stated: "Because the petitioning group was not identified as an Indian entity for a period of almost four decades after 1927 … it has not been identified as an Indian entity on a 'substantially continuous' basis since 1927." The final determination also "concluded that 99 percent of its current members have satisfactorily documented their descent from individuals on the Verona Band proxy list, or sibling thereof."
