= James Pepper Henry =

Native American museum director

- Born: Portland, Oregon
- Citizenship: Kaw Nation and American
- Occupations: Museum director and politician

James Pepper Henry is a Native American museum director and vice chairman of the Kaw Nation. He was the executive director of the First Americans Museum in Oklahoma City, Oklahoma, which opened on 18 September 2021.

On 17 April 2017, the Tulsa World reported that Henry had resigned from his position as executive director of Tulsa's Gilcrease Museum, effective 14 April 2017. Five days later, The Oklahoman, the Oklahoma City newspaper, revealed on 22 April 2017, that the AICCM had hired the former Gilcrease executive director as "director of the Indian Cultural Center (ICC) and chief executive officer of its foundation," starting June 19.

Tulsa University announced that it had hired Henry as the executive director of Gilcrease Museum in Tulsa, Oklahoma, effective 1 March 2015. Henry had previously served as director and CEO of the Heard Museum in Phoenix, Arizona, since 2013. Before going to the Heard, he had served for six years at the Anchorage Museum and ten years as an associate director for the Smithsonian Institution's National Museum of the American Indian (NMAI). He was the founding director of the Kanza Museum in Kaw City, Oklahoma.

He was the first enrolled Native American to head the Heard Museum and is the first Native American, other than Thomas Gilcrease (Muscogee Creek) himself, to head the Gilcrease Museum.

== Early life ==
Henry's mother has Kaw and Muscogee Creek ancestry. He is an enrolled member of the Kaw Nation. Henry wrote about his lifelong connection with Oklahoma, Tulsa, and even Thomas Gilcrease himself. His maternal grandfather—Gilbert Pepper, a member of the Kaw tribe—had met his grandmother, Floy Childers, a Muscogee Creek, while both were attending Haskell Indian School in Lawrence, Kansas. (Note: Both were natives of Oklahoma.) Gilbert was from Washunga, Oklahoma and Floy was from Broken Arrow, Oklahoma. Gilbert Pepper had attended Chilocco Indian Agricultural School and had come to Lawrence, where he also worked as a baker. Floy was working as a home economics teacher. The couple married in Lawrence, then transferred to Chemawa Indian Boarding School in Salem, Oregon. When World War II began, Gilbert was recruited to work as a welder in a shipyard in Portland, Oregon, where their daughter was born.

James Pepper Henry says nothing about his father, (Note: One source claimed that his father was of European descent.) but only says he spent much of his youth with his grandparents. He wrote that every summer, the family went back to Oklahoma to stay with relatives in North Tulsa. His great-grandfather and Thomas Gilcrease were acquainted because both were members of the Muscogee Creek Nation. James had an early introduction to Gilcrease's art collection. The experience inspired him to study art and art history in college.

James Pepper Henry is the nephew of Native American jazz musician Jim Pepper.

== Education ==
Henry enrolled in the University of Oregon School of Architecture and Allied Arts, where he studied fine arts and art history, earning a Bachelor of Arts degree in 1988. He planned to become a sculptor.

== Museum career ==
Henry was reunited with the Gilcrease collection when his friend and former Smithsonian colleague Duane King was hired as the executive director of the Helmerich Center for American Research at Gilcrease Museum, a new facility built by The University of Tulsa. King contacted Henry and told him that the Gilcrease was conducting a search for a new director.

=== Rasmussen Center Museum, Anchorage ===
The extensively remodeled Anchorage Museum opened under Henry's direction in 2010. It was a project that took over ten years and $110 million to complete. According to Henry, the new planetarium included "one of the only two aurora borealis simulators in the world, in a science exhibit." The museum is Alaska-centered, with static exhibits and artifacts interspersed among dynamic, interactive displays designed, for example, to show the impacts of earthquakes and tsunamis. The revamp was also intended to display more of the museum's permanent holdings than it could formerly show at any one time. Director Henry told an interviewer that museum visitors would likely spend twice as much time (4 hours) per visit as before (2 hours per visit).

=== Heard Museum, Phoenix ===
Henry's most memorable achievement during his two-year tenure at the Heard Museum in Phoenix was the exhibit "BUILD! Toy Brick Art at the Heard." An article in Arts Journal blog described it as demonstrating "how American Indian and non-American Indian LEGO brick artists made many 'creative and surprising forms' from the toy." The journal added that "[it was] the most successful summer exhibit in the [Heard] museum's history, increasing museum attendance by 58 percent and memberships by 150 percent."

=== Gilcrease Museum, Tulsa ===
Henry announced his intention to work on the local and international reputation of the museum and renew to museum's offer to attract younger generations via Vision 2025.

Development plans included:

- Adding two new galleries - one containing 8,000 square feet (740 m^{2}) to show more of the existing collection, the other containing 12,000 square feet (1,100 m^{2}) to exhibit traveling collections; (Note: Museum officials say that the present space is sufficient only to display about five percent of the museum's collection to visitors at any one time.)
- Adding a new grand entry and great hall to accommodate large groups of visitors and to transform the appearance of the museum entrance;
- Adding underground parking space;
- Building an elevated restaurant;

On April 17, 2017, the Tulsa World reported that Henry had resigned his position at Gilcrease Museum, effective April 14, 2017. Chief Operating Officer Susan Neal took over day-to-day operations until a new executive director was hired.

=== First Americans Museum, Oklahoma City ===
The Oklahoma City newspaper The Oklahoman revealed on April 22, 2017, that the American Indian Cultural Center & Museum in Oklahoma City had hired the former Gilcrease Executive Director as "... director of the Indian Cultural Center (ICC) and chief executive officer of its foundation," starting June 19. The ICC has been a work in progress for the last 22 years. The "ground blessing" ceremony was held in 2005, and physical construction began in 2006. A visitor center was completed in 2008. According to the Oklahoman, the exterior was partially complete when the Native American Cultural & Educational Authority (NACEA), the state authority overseeing the center, stopped construction for four years because there was inadequate funding to complete the project. Recent agreements between the state government, the government of Oklahoma City and the Chickasaw Nation that will resolve the funding issue are said to be finalized soon. (Note: Bill Anoatubby, Chief of the Choctaw Nation, is also the chairman of NACEA.) Once the agreements are final, completion of the ICC is expected to take three more years.
