= Native Peoples Magazine =

Native Peoples Magazine is an American magazine which was started as a 32-page quarterly magazine in 1987. It was sent to the members of The Heard Museum.

== History ==
In 1987, the Heard Museum of Anthropology and Primitive Art, in association with Media Concepts Group Inc., and Native American Communication Career Development Inc. published the premiere issue of Native peoples : the journal of the Heard Museum. The magazine features articles on the arts and lifestyles of Native Americans. Later the frequency of the magazine was made six per a year.

In 2016 Native Peoples Magazine redesigned its logo and content and initiated its digital applications. The magazine, now serving the consumer periodical market, has an estimated readership of more than 100,000, in 36 countries.
