= Heid E. Erdrich =

Native American poet and author from Minnesota

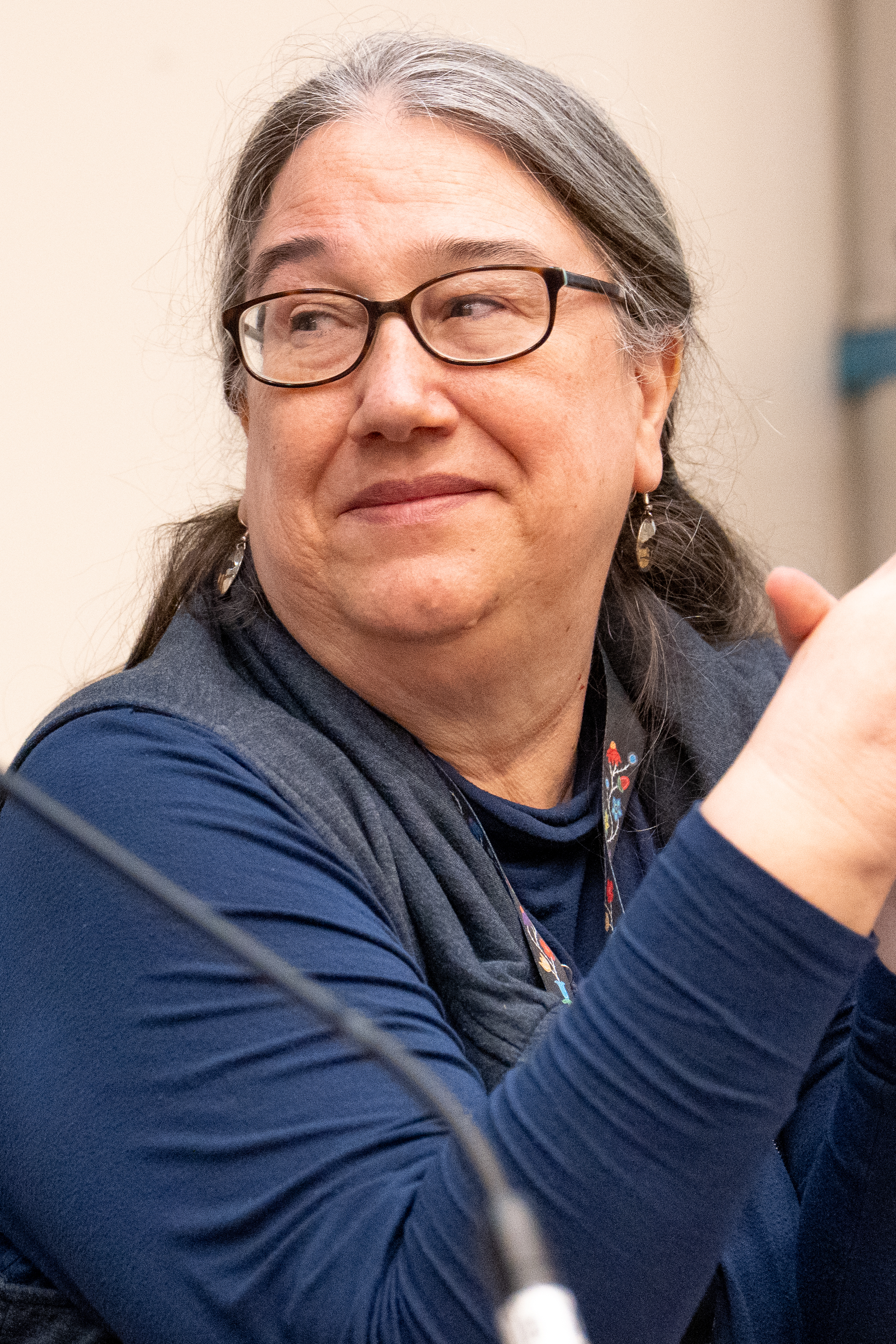
- Born: November 26, 1963 (age 62)
- Education: Dartmouth College (BA); Johns Hopkins University
- Occupation: Writer
- Relatives: Louise Erdrich (sister)
- Website: heiderdrich.com

Heid E. Erdrich (born November 26, 1963) is a Native American poet, editor, and writer. Erdrich is Ojibwe enrolled at Turtle Mountain.

== Early life and education ==
Heid Ellen Erdrich was born in Breckenridge, Minnesota, and was raised in Wahpeton, North Dakota. She comes from a family of seven siblings including sisters Louise Erdrich (well-known contemporary Native writer of fiction, poetry, and nonfiction) and Lise Erdrich (also a published writer). Their father Ralph (German-American) and mother Rita (Turtle Mountain Ojibwe) taught at a Bureau of Indian Affairs boarding school for the Turtle Mountain Band. Their maternal grandfather, Patrick Gourneau, was the tribal chairman of the Turtle Mountain Band of Ojibwe from 1953 to 1959 and fought against Indian termination.

Erdrich graduated from Dartmouth College in 1986 with a B.A. in Literature and Creative Writing. She earned two master's degrees from Johns Hopkins University, one in poetry (1989) and another in fiction (1990). Erdrich holds a PhD in Arts and Sciences in Native American Literature and Writing from Union Institute.

== Career ==
Erdrich has published several volumes of poetry: Fishing for Myth (1997); The Mother's Tongue (2005); National Monuments (2008), which won the Minnesota Book Award; Cell Traffic (2012); and Curator of Ephemera at the New Museum for Archaic Media (2017), which won the Minnesota Book Award in 2018. She has also written short stories and nonfiction. In 2016, Erdrich's "every-blest-thing-seeing-eye" was named the Winter Book by the Minnesota Center for Book Arts. More recently, Erdrich has garnered attention and won awards from Co-Kisser Poetry Festival and Southwestern Association for Indian Artists for her video-poems or poem films—short, collaborative pieces treating contemporary indigenous themes including the Idle No More movement. One of the central collaborators in these video-poems is painter and digital media artist Jonathan Thunder.

Some of her video-poem works include:

- Od'e Miikan-Heart Line (Moose version)
- It Was Cloudy
- Undead Faerie Goes Great with India Pale Ale
- Lexiconography 1
- Pre-Occupied
- Indigenous Elvis Works the Medicine Line

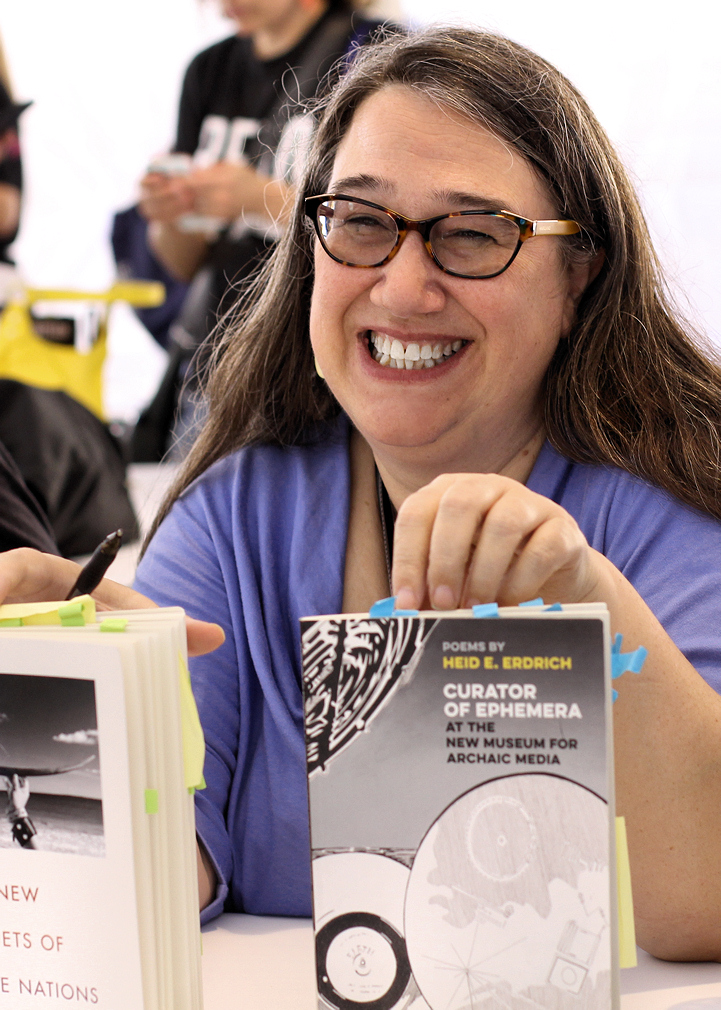
Heid E. Erdrich at the 2018 Texas Book Festival

In addition to her own writing, Erdrich also promotes the work of other Native American authors. She is a guest editor at the Yellow Medicine Review, a journal devoted to indigenous literature and art; and she co-edited a volume of writing by Native American women with Navajo poet Laura Tohe. Her second anthology, New Poets of Native Nations, featuring Native poets who have published first books since the year 2000, was published by Graywolf Press in 2018. Scholar Scott Andrews reviewed the book stating that "These new poets of Native nations carry their voices into an indigenous future that settler colonialism tried to foreclose and that mainstream publishing too seldom recognizes," and noting that it was the first "substantial anthology of US Native poetry" since 1988.

With her sister Louise, she founded The Birchbark House fund at the Minneapolis Foundation, with the intent of supporting Native writing and Native language revitalization. Erdrich teaches writing in the Augsburg University low-residency MFA Creative Writing program, which is dedicated to advancing the work and careers of aspiring writers. Erdrich also directs Wiigwaas Press, which publishes books in Ojibwe (Anishinaabe), as well as films and other media.

On December 19, 2023, the City of Minneapolis announced that Erdrich was appointed as the city's first poet laureate.

== Curatorial practice ==
In addition to being a poet, writer, and editor, Erdrich also has curated museum exhibitions in the Twin Cities area and across the nation. She is currently guest curator at Amherst College's Mead Museum. One early exhibition was part of the larger series called "Greening the Riverfront" which is a project aimed at exploring the history and transformation of the Minneapolis Riverfront. Erdrich's curation of this exhibit "fed a broader arterial network of Ojibwe and Indigenous women artists and activists who have worked to make visible the continuing claims of this and other threatened riverine systems " (Bernardin, 2017, pp. 39).

== Publications ==
- Erdrich, Heid E. (1992). Maria Tallchief. Heinemann Library. ISBN 978-0811440998.
- Erdrich, Heid E. (1997). Fishing for Myth: Poems by Heid E. Erdrich. New Rivers Press. ISBN 978-0898231748.
- Erdrich, Heid E. (1999). "Indians Who've Been to Paris". In Blaeser, Kimberly (ed.). Stories Migrating Home. Bemidji, MN: Loonfeather Press. pp. 145–156. ISBN 978-0926147089.
- Erdrich, Heid E.; Tohe, Laura, eds. (2002). Sister Nations: Native American Women Writers on Community. Native Voices. With foreword by Winona LaDuke. Minnesota Historical Society. ISBN 978-0873514279.
- Erdrich, Heid E. (2005). The Mother's Tongue. Salt Publishing. ISBN 978-1844710607.
- Erdrich, Heid E. (2008). National Monuments. Michigan State University Press. ISBN 978-0870138485.
- Erdrich, Heid E. (2012). Cell Traffic: New and Selected Poems. University of Arizona Press. ISBN 978-0816530083.
- Erdrich, Heid E. (2013). Original Local: Indigenous Foods, Stories and Recipes from the Upper Midwest. MN Historical Society Press. ISBN 978-0873518949.
- Erdrich, Heid E. (2018). Curator of Ephemera at the New Museum for Archaic Media. Michigan State University Press. ISBN 978-1611862461.
- Erdrich, Heid E. (2018). New Poets of Native Nations. Graywolf Press. ISBN 978-1-55597-809-9
- Erdrich, Heid E. (2020). Little Big Bully. Penguin Random House. ISBN 9780143135920
- Erdrich, Heid E. (2024). Verb Animate: Poetry and Prompts from Collaborative Acts. Trio House Press. ISBN 978-1949487442

== Awards and teaching ==
Her honors include a National Poetry Series award, two Minnesota Book Awards and a Native Arts and Cultures National Fellowship.

Erdrich has taught at Johns Hopkins University (1989-1992) and was tenured at the University of St. Thomas where she taught until 2007. Since leaving full-time teaching, Erdrich has taught at Augsburg University in the MFA in writing low-residency program and elsewhere. She was the 2019 Distinguished Visiting Professor in Liberal Arts at University of Minnesota Morris, the Glasgow Writer-in-Residence for Washington and Lee University in 2021, and the Elliston poet-in-residence at the University of Cincinnati in 2022. Also in 2022, Erdrich taught for a term in NAIS at Dartmouth College. She has also taught workshops for Native writers at Turtle Mountain Community College, along with her sister Louise.

Erdrich directs Wiigwaas Press, an Ojibwe language publisher. She has received two Minnesota Book Awards, as well as fellowships and awards from the National Poetry Series, Native Arts and Cultures Foundation, McKnight Foundation, Minnesota State Arts Board, Bush Foundation, Loft Literary Center, First People’s Fund, and others. From 2014 to 2022, she taught in the low-residency MFA creative writing program at Augsburg University. She was the 2019 Distinguished Visiting Professor in Liberal Arts at University of Minnesota Morris.
