= Muwekma Ohlone Tribe =

Cultural organization in Alameda County, California

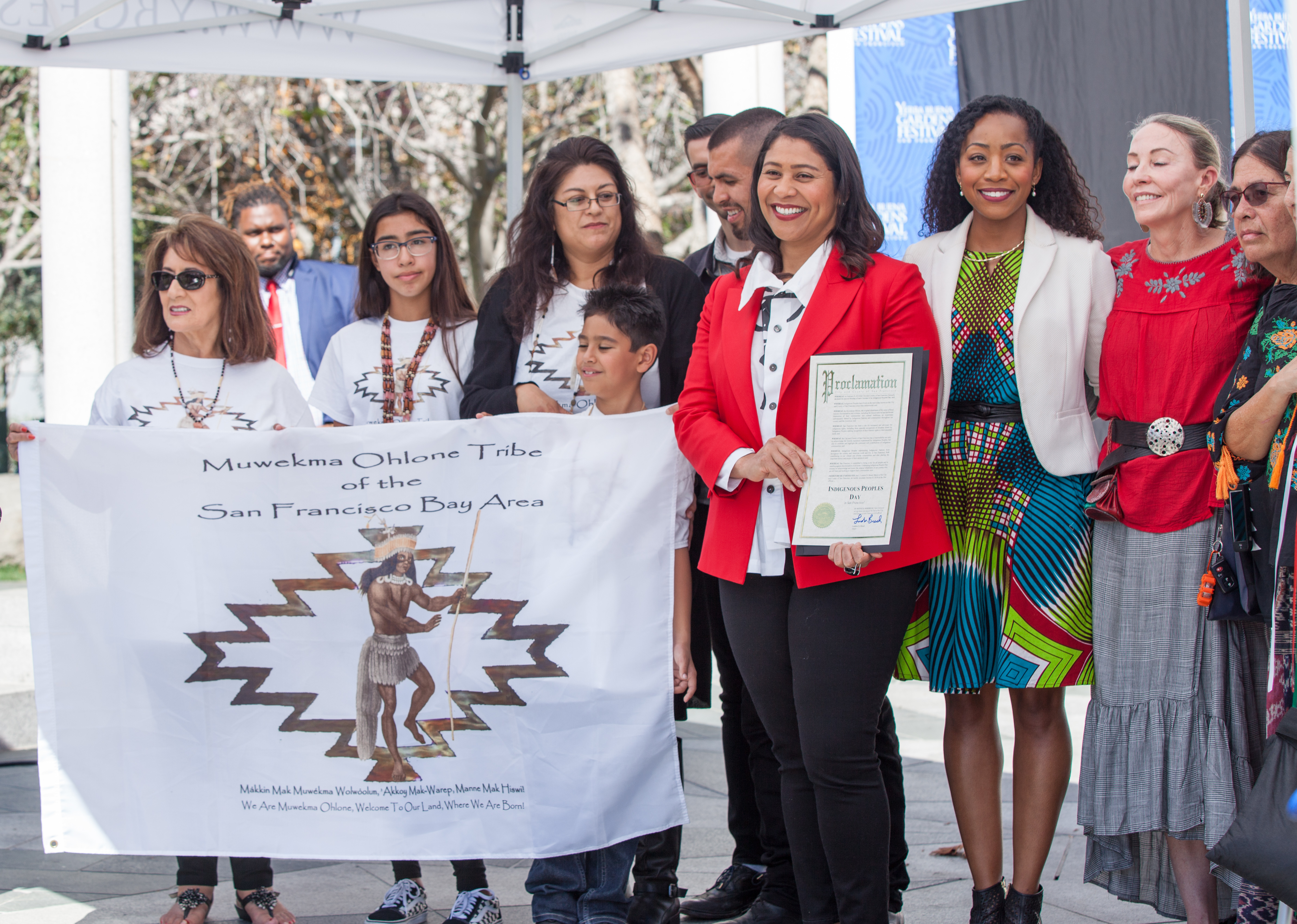
- Members of the Muwekma Ohlone Tribe attend a proclamation of San Francisco's first official Indigenous Peoples' Day, October 2018.
- Named after: Chochenyo muwékma ("the people")
- Formation: nonprofit: 2018
- Founded at: Castro Valley, California
- Type: nonprofit organization
- Tax ID no.: EIN 82-2448663
- Purpose: Arts, Cultural Organizations - Multipurpose (A20)
- Headquarters: Castro Valley, California
- Location: United States
- Official language: English
- Principal officer: Charlene Nijmeh
- Revenue: $714,765 (2022)
- Expenses: $384,655 (2022)
- Staff: 1 (2022)
- Website: muwekma.org
- Formerly called: Ohlone/Costanoan Muwekma Tribe

The Muwekma Ohlone Tribe is an unrecognized American Indian organization, primarily composed of documented descendants of the Ohlone, an historic Indigenous people of California. The Muwekma Ohlone Tribe is the largest of several groups in the San Francisco Bay Area that identify as Ohlone tribes.

Almost all members of the organization are documented descendants of the Verona Band of Alameda County, a historic band of Ohlone people.

== Status ==
The organization is not recognized as a Native American tribe by the federal government or by the California state government, which does not recognize any state tribes.

=== Petition for federal recognition ===
The Muwekma Ohlone Tribe, formerly known as the Ohlone/Costanoan Muwekma Tribe, applied for federal recognition as a Native American tribe; however, their petition was denied in 2002. The US Department of the Interior Bureau of Indian Affairs found a lack of "evidence since 1927 of substantially continuous external identification of the petitioning group as a continuation of the historical 'Verona Band' or Pleasanton rancheria." The final determination also stated: "Because the petitioning group was not identified as an Indian entity for a period of almost four decades after 1927 … it has not been identified as an Indian entity on a 'substantially continuous' basis since 1927." The final determination also "concluded that 99 percent of its current members have satisfactorily documented their descent from individuals on the Verona Band proxy list, or sibling thereof."

== Nonprofit organization ==
The Muwekma Ohlone Tribe Inc. was incorporated as a 501(c)(3) nonprofit organization in 2018. Charlene Nijmeh, based in Castro Valley, California, is the principal officer. Their mission states: "The specific purpose of this corporation is for religious purposes of addressing ancestral [N]ative [A]merican sacred sites."

In 2020 and 2022, their administration was:

- Chairman: Charlene Nijmeh
- Vice Chair: Richard Massiatt
- Treasurer: Monica Arellano
- Secretary: Gloria E Gomez

The Peninsula Open Space Trust, Children and Nature Network, and PayPal Giving Fund all provided grants to the nonprofit in 2021 or 2022.

== Dispute with other Ohlone groups ==
Other unrecognized Ohlone organizations such as the Association of Ramaytush Ohlone, the Tamien Nation, and the Confederated Villages of Lisjan have accused the Muwekma Ohlone Tribe of undermining their historical claims of legitimacy with the goal of controlling potential future Ohlone Indian gaming rights.

The resulting confusion has caused difficulties for local cities seeking to perform appropriate land acknowledgements as part of government meetings.

== Disinformation campaign against Zoe Lofgren and Ohlone organizations ==
In her 2024 campaign to represent California's 18th congressional district, Muwekma chairwoman Charlene Nijmeh retained the services of political consultant Matthew Ricchiazzi, who created fake news sites and distributed 60,000 anonymous fake newspapers attacking incumbent House Representative Zoe Lofgren. Per Federal elections law, campaign materials must include campaign ID numbers or disclosures, which these did not. Ricchiazzi said he was not working on behalf of the Nijmeh campaign and the papers were merely "an independent hobby project of mine". In a May 2024 interview with Robert F. Kennedy Jr.'s vice-presidential candidate Nicole Shanahan, Nijmeh described Ricchiazzi as her "assistant" and said that he was entitled to "free speech". Local businesses complained the newspaper included fake ads that used their business names without permission. Nijmeh failed to make it past the March 5 primary, receiving only 11 percent of the vote.

Ricchiazzi also created a purported news site, "The San Francisco Inquirer", which sought to undermine legitimacy claims of several other Ohlone groups. The site included accusations that Association of Ramaytush Ohlone Executive Director Jonathan Cordero is “widely seen in Indian Country as a ‘Pretendian'," while not identifying any source for the statement.

== Bid to take over Presidio ==
In 2025, after President Donald J. Trump issued an executive order threatening to downsize the Presidio Trust in San Francisco, the Muwekma Ohlone group filed a petition saying that the legislation that created the national park should be repealed, and the park turned over to them to manage. “As the current administration works to eliminate the Presidio Trust as part of its effort to streamline the federal workforce, we stand ready to offer a cost-effective, environmentally responsible solution to filling the stewardship void,” chairwoman Charlene Nijmeh said. (The park is self-supporting and has not received federal funding since 2013.) Lobbying disclosure forms revealed that the Muwekma had hired Trump ally Roger Stone as a lobbyist in 2025.

== Notable members ==
- Vincent Medina, American chef

== See also ==
- Cafe Ohlone
- List of organizations that self-identify as Native American tribes
- Native American recognition in the United States
- Ohlone
