= Sean Sherman =

Oglala Lakota Sioux chef and cookbook author

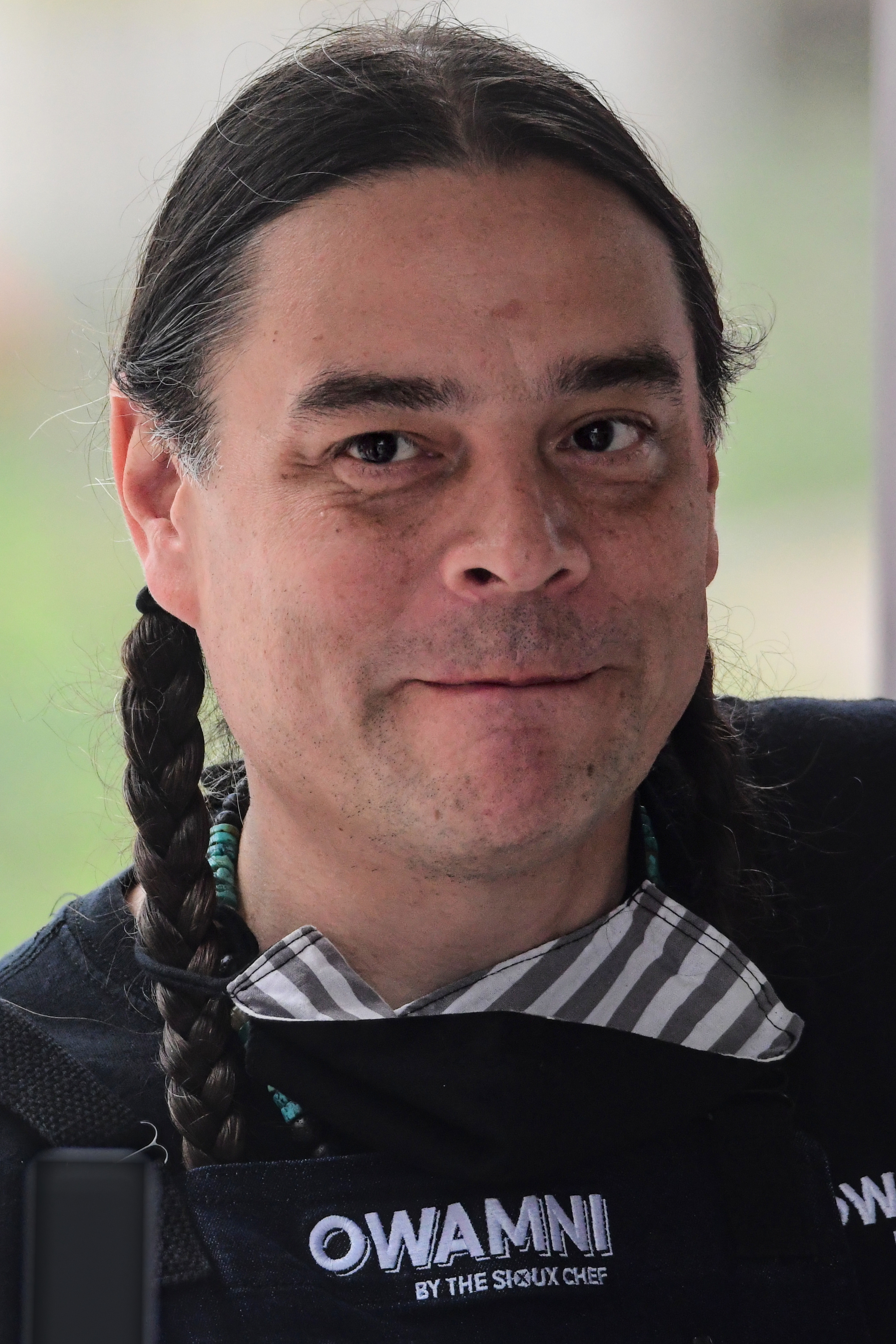
- Sherman in 2021
- Born: 1974 (age 51–52); Pine Ridge, South Dakota, U.S.
- Education: Black Hills State University
- Culinary career
- Cooking style: Indigenous cuisine
- Current restaurant
- Owamni
- Awardss
- James Beard Foundation Awards: Best American Cookbook, 2017; Leadership, 2019; Best New Restaurant, 2022
- Website: seansherman.com

Sean Sherman (born 1974) is an Oglala Lakota Sioux chef, cookbook author, forager, and promoter of indigenous cuisine. Sherman founded the indigenous food education business and caterer The Sioux Chef and the nonprofit North American Traditional Indigenous Food Systems (NĀTIFS). He received a James Beard Foundation Leadership Award and his 2017 cookbook, The Sioux Chef's Indigenous Kitchen, won the 2018 James Beard Award for Best American Cookbook. In 2022 the restaurant he owned, Owamni, won the James Beard Award for Best New Restaurant.

== Early life ==
Sherman was born in 1974 and grew up on his grandparents' ranch on the Pine Ridge reservation in South Dakota. He hunted and foraged from an early age, recalling his grandfather giving him a shotgun on his seventh birthday. He grew up eating many government commodity foods such as cereal, shortening, and canned hash, which he cites as the norm he seeks to depart from. He attended Black Hills State University. His grandparents were fluent in Lakota.

== Early career ==
Sherman got his first restaurant job washing dishes at 13, soon moving onto the line. He spent a summer working for the US Forest Service in the Black Hills, identifying plants. He spent most of his twenties working in a series of Minneapolis restaurants and by 27 was working as an executive chef. By 29 he was burnt out and spent some time in Mexico regrouping; while in Puerto Vallarta he spent time with some Huichol people and had an "epiphany", saying: "After seeing how the Huicholes held onto so much of their pre-European culture through artwork and food, I recognized I wanted to know my own food heritage. What did my ancestors eat before the Europeans arrived on our lands?”

== Career ==
In 2014, Chef Sean launched "The Sioux Chef," a venture designed to provide catering and food education services in the Minneapolis–Saint Paul area. He also created and launched the "Tatanka" food truck—which served cuisine from the Dakota and Minnesota lands as it existed prior to European arrival—and recently opened "Owamni by The Sioux Chef," Minnesota’s first full-service Indigenous restaurant. In 2014 Sherman founded indigenous food education business and caterer The Sioux Chef. The Washington Post called it "a homonym to another... culinary concept", the sous-chef. In 2015, he launched Tatanka Truck, a food truck that offered such dishes as bison wild rice and teas made from cedar and maple.

He founded the nonprofit North American Traditional Indigenous Food Systems (NĀTIFS) in 2017.

In 2017 Sherman co-authored The Sioux Chef's Indigenous Kitchen, published by the University of Minnesota, which won the 2018 James Beard Award for Best American Cookbook. In order to create the book's recipes, he interviewed older community members and searched archives for descriptions of traditional Lakota foods. Recipes in the book contain no dairy, wheat, beef, pork, or cane sugar, as these are non-indigenous ingredients, brought to North America by European colonizers. Sherman describes the recipes as "hyperlocal, ultraseasonal, uber-healthy [and] most of all, it's utterly delicious." Publishers Weekly called the book, "an illuminating guide to Native American food that will enthrall home cooks and food historians alike." That same year he prepared a six-course dinner at the James Beard House.

In 2018 he participated in a National Museum of American History roundtable at the Food History weekend event. During the event he prepared a traditional dish, Mag˘áksic˘a na Psíŋ Wasná, duck and wild rice pemmican.

In 2019 Sherman received a James Beard Foundation Leadership Award, which recognizes people and organizations that "(work) to change our food world for the better."

In 2021 he opened a restaurant, Owamni, in Minneapolis, Minnesota, serving dishes using ingredients present in North America before European colonization. Owamni won the 2022 James Beard Foundation Award for Best New Restaurant.

The New York Times called his style "colorful and elegant".

Sherman was named to the TIME 100 Most Influential People of 2023 list.

== Philosophy ==
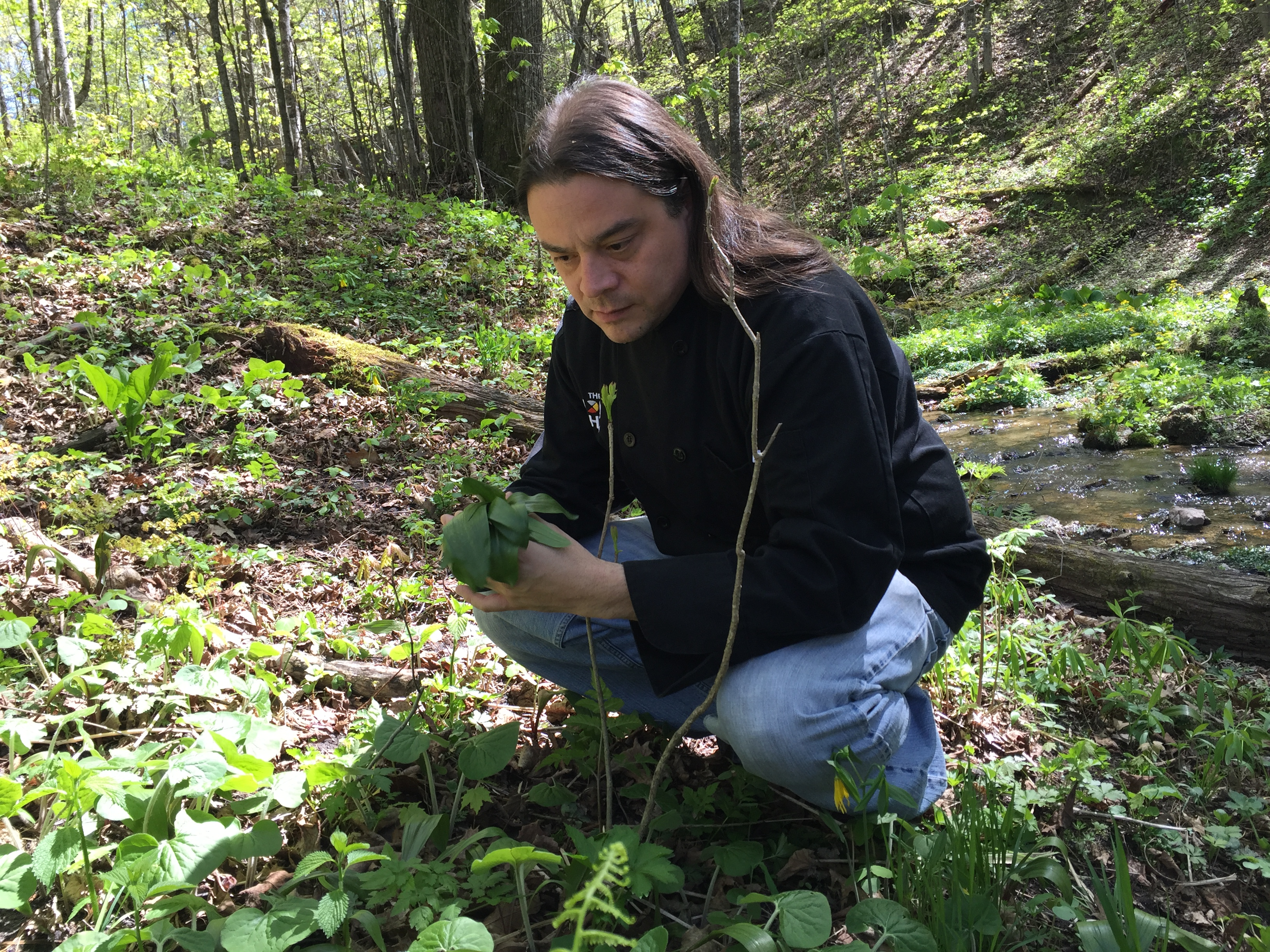
Sherman foraging wild ramps

Sherman abandoned the use of ingredients that are not endemic to North America after having "an epiphany" while working at a restaurant in Mexico that used local ingredients and realizing that the traditional foods of the Oglala were "completely unrepresented in American cuisine." He objects to indigenous cuisine being called "the next big thing", saying, "This is not a trend. It's a way of life." He told the James Beard Foundation, "We're not trying to cook like it's 1491. We're trying to take knowledge from the past and evolve it for today."

Along with some other Native American chefs, Sherman rejects frybread, often associated with "traditional" Native American cuisine, calling it "everything that isn't Native American food" and writing that it represents "perseverance and pain, ingenuity and resilience." Frybread was developed out of necessity using government-provided flour, sugar, and lard, leading these chefs to consider it a symbol of colonial oppression. These ingredients were only provided because the government had moved indigenous peoples onto land that could not support growing traditional staples like corn and beans. Frybread's significance to Native Americans has been described as complicated and their relationship with it conflicted.

== Personal life ==
Sherman lives in Minneapolis, Minnesota. He has one son.

== Awards ==
- 2018 James Beard Best American Cookbook
- 2019 James Beard Leadership Award
- 2022 James Beard Best New Restaurant
- 2023 Julia Child Award

== Books ==
- The Sioux Chef's Indigenous Kitchen (2017)

== See also ==
- Ingredients native to the Americas
