= List of federally recognized tribes by state =

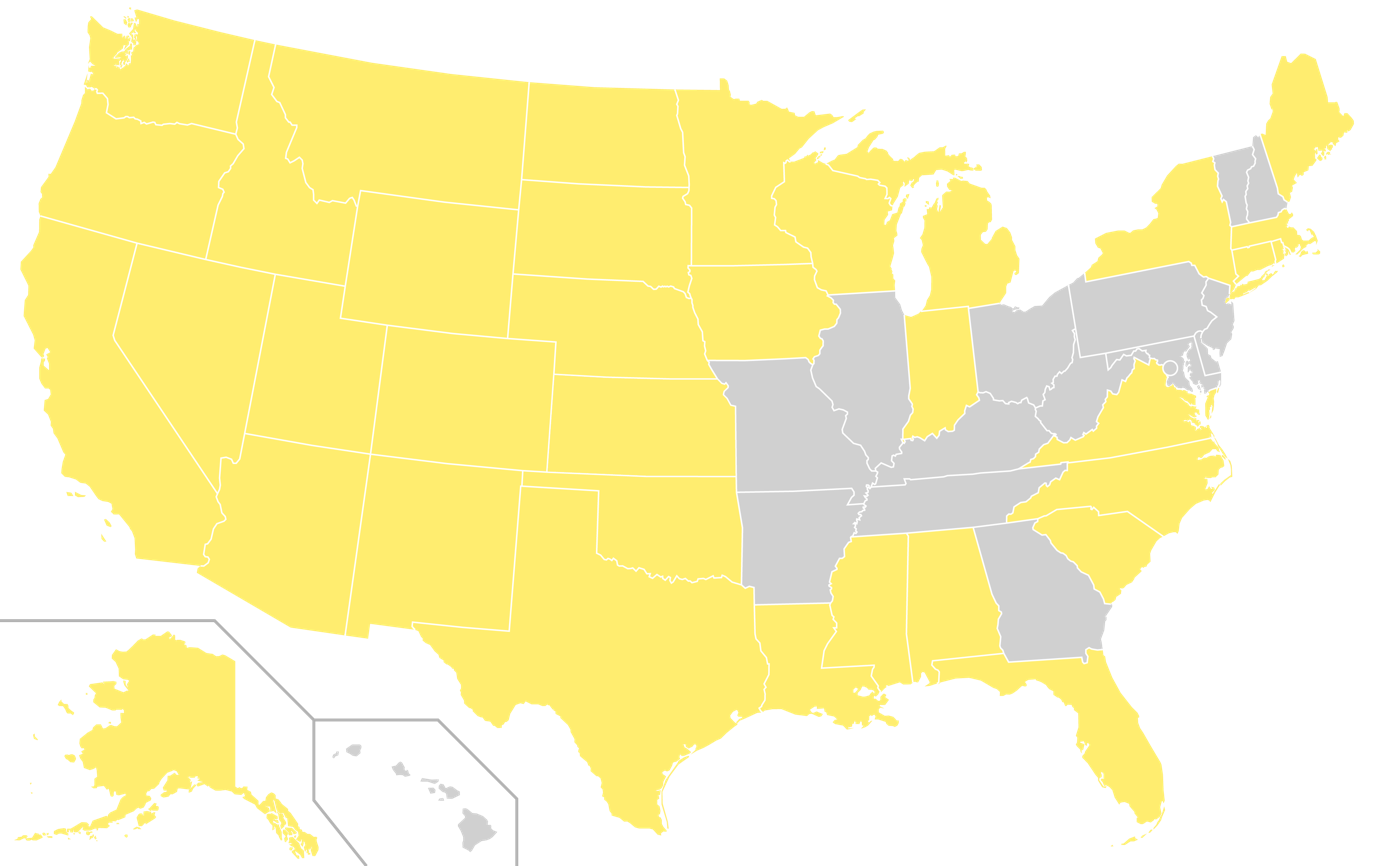
Map of states with U.S. federally recognized tribes marked in yellow. States with no federally recognized tribes are marked in gray.

Indian reservations

Federally recognized tribes are those Native American tribes recognized by the United States Bureau of Indian Affairs as holding a government-to-government relationship with the U.S.federal government. As of 2025, 575 Indian tribes have been legally recognized by the Bureau of Indian Affairs (BIA) of the United States.

== Description ==
In the United States, the Native American tribe is a fundamental unit of sovereign tribal government. As the Department of the Interior explains, "federally recognized tribes are recognized as possessing certain inherent rights of self-government (i.e., tribal sovereignty)...." The constitution grants to the U.S. Congress the right to interact with tribes. More specifically, the Supreme Court of the United States in United States v. Sandoval (231 US. 28 [1913]) warned, "it is not ... that Congress may bring a community or body of people within range of this power by arbitrarily calling them an Indian tribe, but only that in respect of distinctly Indian communities the questions whether, to what extent, and for what time they shall be recognized and dealt with as dependent tribes" (at 46). Federal tribal recognition grants to tribes the right to self-government, as well as certain benefits. The recognition process is largely controlled by the United States federal agency the Bureau of Indian Affairs, in consultation with federally recognized tribes.

In January 2015, the United States' Federal Register issued an official list of 566 tribes that are Indian Entities Recognized and Eligible To Receive Services From the United States Bureau of Indian Affairs. The number of tribes increased to 567 in July 2015 with the federal recognition of the Pamunkey tribe in Virginia. USA.gov, the federal government's official web portal, maintains a list of tribal governments which is constantly updated. Ancillary information present in former versions of this list but no longer contained in the current listing have been included here in italics print.

In 2018, six more Virginia-based tribes were added to the list, then in 2020 the Little Shell Chippewa were recognized, bringing the total to 574. When the Lumbee Tribe of North Carolina received federal recognition in December 2025, the total increased to 575. Of these, 231 are located in Alaska.

Except for Hawaii, states that have no federally recognized tribes today forcibly removed tribes from their region in the 19th century, mainly to the west and especially to Indian Territory, now Oklahoma.

== Alabama ==
- Poarch Band of Creek Indians
  (previously listed as Poarch Band of Creeks, Poarch Band of Creek Indians of Alabama, Creek Nation East of the Mississippi)

== Alaska ==
- Agdaagux Tribe of King Cove
- Akiachak Native Community
- Akiak Native Community
- Alatna Village
- Algaaciq Native Village (St. Mary's)
- Allakaket Village
- Alutiiq Tribe of Old Harbor, previously listed as Native Village of Old Harbor and Village of Old Harbor
- Angoon Community Association
- Anvik Village
- Arctic Village, see Native Village of Venetie Tribal Government
- Asa'carsarmiut Tribe
- Beaver Village
- Birch Creek Tribe
- Central Council of the Tlingit & Haida Indian Tribes
- Chalkyitsik Village
- Cheesh-Na Tribe
  previously listed as Native Village of Chistochina
- Chevak Native Village
- Chickaloon Native Village
- Chignik Bay Tribal Council
  previously listed as Native Village of Chignik
- Chignik Lake Village
- Chilkat Indian Village (Klukwan)
- Chilkoot Indian Association (Haines)
- Chinik Eskimo Community (Golovin)
- Chuloonawick Native Village
- Circle Native Community
- Craig Tribal Association
  previously Craig Community Association
- Curyung Tribal Council
  previously the Native Village of Dillingham
- Douglas Indian Association
- Egegik Village
- Eklutna Native Village
- Emmonak Village
- Evansville Village (aka Bettles Field)
- Galena Village (aka Louden Village)
- Gulkana Village Council
  previously listed as Gulkana Village
- Healy Lake Village
- Holy Cross Tribe
  previously listed as Holy Cross Village
- Hoonah Indian Association
- Hughes Village
- Huslia Village
- Hydaburg Cooperative Association
- Igiugig Village
- Inupiat Community of the Arctic Slope
- Iqugmiut Traditional Council
  previously listed as Iqurmuit Traditional Council
- Ivanof Bay Tribe
  previously listed as Ivanoff Bay Tribe and Ivanoff Bay Village
- Kaguyak Village
- Kaktovik Village (aka Barter Island)
- Kasigluk Traditional Elders Council
- Kenaitze Indian Tribe
- Ketchikan Indian Community
  previously listed as Ketchikan Indian Corporation
- King Island Native Community
- King Salmon Tribe
- Klawock Cooperative Association
- Knik Tribe
- Kokhanok Village
- Koyukuk Native Village
- Levelock Village
- Lime Village
- Manley Hot Springs Village
- Manokotak Village
- McGrath Native Village
- Mentasta Traditional Council
- Metlakatla Indian Community, Annette Island Reserve
- Naknek Native Village
- Native Village of Afognak
- Native Village of Akhiok
- Native Village of Akutan
- Native Village of Aleknagik
- Native Village of Ambler
- Native Village of Atka
- Native Village of Atqasuk
  previously listed as Atqasuk Village (Atkasook)
- Native Village of Barrow Inupiat Traditional Government
- Native Village of Belkofski
- Native Village of Brevig Mission
- Native Village of Buckland
- Native Village of Cantwell
- Native Village of Chenega (aka Chanega)
- Native Village of Chignik Lagoon
- Native Village of Chitina
- Native Village of Chuathbaluk (Russian Mission, Kuskokwim)
- Native Village of Council
- Native Village of Deering
- Native Village of Diomede (aka Inalik)
- Native Village of Eagle
- Native Village of Eek
- Native Village of Ekuk
- Native Village of Ekwok
  previously listed as Ekwok Village]]
- Native Village of Elim
- Native Village of Eyak (Cordova)
- Native Village of False Pass
- Native Village of Fort Yukon
- Native Village of Gakona
- Native Village of Gambell
- Native Village of Georgetown
- Native Village of Goodnews Bay
- Native Village of Hamilton
- Native Village of Hooper Bay
- Native Village of Kanatak
- Native Village of Karluk
- Native Village of Kiana
- Native Village of Kipnuk
- Native Village of Kivalina
- Native Village of Kluti Kaah (aka Copper Center)
- Native Village of Kobuk
- Native Village of Kongiganak
- Native Village of Kotzebue
- Native Village of Koyuk
- Native Village of Kwigillingok
- Native Village of Kwinhagak (aka Quinhagak)
- Native Village of Larsen Bay
- Native Village of Marshall (aka Fortuna Ledge)
- Native Village of Mary's Igloo
- Native Village of Mekoryuk
- Native Village of Minto
- Native Village of Nanwalek (aka English Bay)
- Native Village of Napaimute
- Native Village of Napakiak
- Native Village of Napaskiak
- Native Village of Nelson Lagoon
- Native Village of Nightmute
- Native Village of Nikolski
- Native Village of Noatak
- Native Village of Nuiqsut (aka Nooiksut)
- Native Village of Nunam Iqua
  previously listed as Native Village of Sheldon's Point
- Native Village of Nunapitchuk
- Native Village of Ouzinkie
- Native Village of Paimiut
- Native Village of Perryville
- Native Village of Pilot Point
- Native Village of Point Hope
- Native Village of Point Lay
- Native Village of Port Graham
- Native Village of Port Heiden
- Native Village of Port Lions
- Native Village of Ruby
- Native Village of Saint Michael
- Native Village of Savoonga
- Native Village of Scammon Bay
- Native Village of Selawik
- Native Village of Shaktoolik
- Native Village of Shishmaref
- Native Village of Shungnak
- Native Village of Stevens
- Native Village of Tanacross
- Native Village of Tanana
- Native Village of Tatitlek
- Native Village of Tazlina
- Native Village of Teller
- Native Village of Tetlin
- Native Village of Tuntutuliak
- Native Village of Tununak
- Native Village of Tyonek
- Native Village of Unalakleet
- Native Village of Unga
- Native Village of Venetie Tribal Government (Arctic Village and Village of Venetie)
- Native Village of Wales
- Native Village of White Mountain
- Nenana Native Association
- New Koliganek Village Council
- New Stuyahok Village
- Newhalen Village
- Newtok Village
- Nikolai Village
- Ninilchik Village
- Nome Eskimo Community
- Nondalton Village
- Noorvik Native Community
- Northway Village
- Nulato Village
- Nunakauyarmiut Tribe
- Organized Village of Grayling (aka Holikachuk)
- Organized Village of Kake
- Organized Village of Kasaan
- Organized Village of Kwethluk
- Organized Village of Saxman
- Orutsararmiut Traditional Native Council
  previously listed as Orutsararmuit Native Village (aka Bethel)
- Oscarville Traditional Village
- Pauloff Harbor Village
- Pedro Bay Village
- Petersburg Indian Association
- Pilot Station Traditional Village
- Pitka's Point Traditional Council
  previously listed as Native Village of Pitka's Point
- Platinum Traditional Village
- Portage Creek Village (aka Ohgsenakale)
- Pribilof Islands Aleut Communities of St. Paul & St. George Islands (Saint George Island and Saint Paul Island)
- Qagan Tayagungin Tribe of Sand Point
  previously listed as Qagan Tayagungin Tribe of Sand Point Village
- Qawalangin Tribe of Unalaska
- Rampart Village
- Saint George Island
  See Pribilof Islands Aleut Communities of St. Paul & St. George Islands
- Saint Paul Island
  See Pribilof Islands Aleut Communities of St. Paul & St. George Islands
- Salamatof Tribe
  previously listed as Village of Salamatoff
- Seldovia Village Tribe
- Shageluk Native Village
- Sitka Tribe of Alaska
- Skagway Village
- South Naknek Village
- Stebbins Community Association
- Sun'aq Tribe of Kodiak
  previously listed as Shoonaq' Tribe of Kodiak
- Takotna Village
- Tangirnaq Native Village
  previously listed as Lesnoi Village (aka Woody Island)
- Telida Village
- Traditional Village of Togiak
- Tuluksak Native Community
- Twin Hills Village
- Ugashik Village
- Umkumiut Native Village
  previously listed as Umkumiute Native Village
- Village of Alakanuk
- Village of Anaktuvuk Pass
- Village of Aniak
- Village of Atmautluak
- Village of Bill Moore's Slough
- Village of Chefornak
- Village of Clarks Point
- Village of Crooked Creek
- Village of Dot Lake
- Village of Iliamna
- Village of Kalskag
- Village of Kaltag
- Village of Kotlik
- Village of Lower Kalskag
- Village of Ohogamiut
- Village of Red Devil
- Village of Sleetmute
- Village of Solomon
- Village of Stony River
- Village of Venetie
  see Native Village of Venetie Tribal Government
- Village of Wainwright
- Wrangell Cooperative Association
- Yakutat Tlingit Tribe
- Yupiit of Andreafski

== Arizona ==
- Ak-Chin Indian Community
  (previously listed as Ak Chin Indian Community of the Maricopa (Ak Chin) Indian Reservation, Arizona)
- Cocopah Tribe of Arizona
- Fort McDowell Yavapai Nation, Arizona
  (previously listed as Fort McDowell Mohave-Apache Community of the Fort McDowell Indian Reservation)
- Gila River Indian Community of the Gila River Indian Reservation, Arizona
- Havasupai Tribe of the Havasupai Reservation, Arizona
- Hopi Tribe of Arizona
- Hualapai Indian Tribe of the Hualapai Indian Reservation, Arizona
- Kaibab Band of Paiute Indians of the Kaibab Indian Reservation, Arizona
- Pascua Yaqui Tribe of Arizona
- Salt River Pima-Maricopa Indian Community of the Salt River Reservation, Arizona
- San Carlos Apache Tribe of the San Carlos Reservation, Arizona
- San Juan Southern Paiute Tribe of Arizona
- Tohono O'odham Nation of Arizona
- Tonto Apache Tribe of Arizona
- White Mountain Apache Tribe of the Fort Apache Reservation, Arizona
- Yavapai-Apache Nation of the Camp Verde Indian Reservation, Arizona
- Yavapai-Prescott Tribe of the Yavapai Reservation, Arizona

Multiple states:

- Colorado River Indian Tribes of the Colorado River Indian Reservation, Arizona and California
- Fort Mojave Indian Tribe of Arizona, California & Nevada
- Navajo Nation, Arizona, New Mexico & Utah
- Quechan Tribe of the Fort Yuma Indian Reservation, California & Arizona
- Zuni Tribe of the Zuni Reservation, New Mexico

== Arkansas ==
No federally recognized tribes

== California ==
- Agua Caliente Band of Cahuilla Indians of the Agua Caliente Indian Reservation, California
- Alturas Indian Rancheria, California
- Augustine Band of Cahuilla Indians, California
  (previously listed as Augustine Band of Cahuilla Mission Indians of the Augustine Reservation, California)
- Bear River Band of the Rohnerville Rancheria, California
- Berry Creek Rancheria of Maidu Indians of California
- Big Lagoon Rancheria, California
- Big Pine Band of Owens Valley Paiute Shoshone Indians of the Big Pine Reservation, California
- Big Sandy Rancheria of Mono Indians of California
- Big Valley Band of Pomo Indians of the Big Valley Rancheria, California
- Blue Lake Rancheria, California
- Bridgeport Paiute Indian Colony of California
- Buena Vista Rancheria of Me-Wuk Indians of California
- Cabazon Band of Cahuilla Indians
  (previously listed as Cabazon Band of Mission Indians, California; Cabazon Band of Cahuilla Mission Indians of the Cabazon Reservation)
- Cachil DeHe Band of Wintun Indians of the Colusa Indian Community of the Colusa Rancheria, California
- Cahto Indian Tribe of the Laytonville Rancheria, California
- Cahuilla Band of Mission Indians of the Cahuilla Reservation, California
- California Valley Miwok Tribe, California
  (previously the Sheep Ranch Rancheria of Me-Wuk Indians of California)
- Campo Band of Diegueno Mission Indians of the Campo Indian Reservation, California
- Capitan Grande Band of Diegueno Mission Indians of California:
  - Barona Group of Capitan Grande Band of Mission Indians of the Barona Reservation, California
  - Viejas (Baron Long) Group of Capitan Grande Band of Mission Indians of the Viejas Reservation, California
- Cedarville Rancheria, California
- Chemehuevi Indian Tribe of the Chemehuevi Reservation, California
- Cher-Ae Heights Indian Community of the Trinidad Rancheria, California
- Chicken Ranch Rancheria of Me-Wuk Indians of California
- Cloverdale Rancheria of Pomo Indians of California
- Cold Springs Rancheria of Mono Indians of California
- Cortina Indian Rancheria of Wintun Indians of California
- Coyote Valley Band of Pomo Indians of California
- Death Valley Timbi-Sha Shoshone Band of California
- Dry Creek Rancheria of Pomo Indians of California
- Elem Indian Colony of Pomo Indians of the Sulphur Bank Rancheria, California
- Elk Valley Rancheria, California
- Enterprise Rancheria of Maidu Indians of California
- Ewiiaapaayp Band of Kumeyaay Indians, California
  (previously listed as Cuyapaipe Community of Diegueno Mission Indians of the Cuyapaipe Reservation)
- Federated Indians of Graton Rancheria, California
  (previously listed as Graton Rancheria)
  (previously listed as Federated Coast Miwok)
- Fort Bidwell Indian Community of the Fort Bidwell Reservation of California
- Fort Independence Indian Community of Paiute Indians of the Fort Independence Reservation, California
- Greenville Rancheria of Maidu Indians of California
- Grindstone Indian Rancheria of Wintun-Wailaki Indians of California
- Guidiville Rancheria of California
- Habematolel Pomo of Upper Lake, California
  (previously listed as Upper Lake Band of Pomo Indians of Upper Lake Rancheria of California)
- Hoopa Valley Tribe, California
- Hopland Band of Pomo Indians of the Hopland Rancheria, California
- Inaja Band of Diegueno Mission Indians of the Inaja and Cosmit Reservation, California
- Ione Band of Miwok Indians of California
- Jackson Rancheria of Me-Wuk Indians of California
- Jamul Indian Village of California
- Karuk Tribe of California
- Kashia Band of Pomo Indians of the Stewarts Point Rancheria, California
- Kletsel Dehe Wintun Nation of the Cortina Rancheria
  (previously listed as Kletsel Dehe Band of Wintun Indians)
- Koi Nation of Northern California
  (previously listed as Koi Nation)
- La Jolla Band of Luiseno Mission Indians of the La Jolla Reservation, California
- La Posta Band of Diegueno Mission Indians of the La Posta Indian Reservation, California
- Los Coyotes Band of Cahuilla & Cupeno Indians of the Los Coyotes Reservation, California
  (previously listed as Los Coyotes Band of Cahuilla Mission Indians of the Los Coyotes Reservation)
- Lytton Rancheria of California
- Manchester Band of Pomo Indians of the Manchester Rancheria, California
  (previously listed as Manchester Band of Pomo Indians of the Manchester-Point Arena Rancheria, California)
- Manzanita Band of Diegueno Mission Indians of the Manzanita Reservation, California
- Mechoopda Indian Tribe of Chico Rancheria, California
- Mesa Grande Band of Diegueno Mission Indians of the Mesa Grande Reservation, California
- Middletown Rancheria of Pomo Indians of California
- Mooretown Rancheria of Maidu Indians of California
- Morongo Band of Cahuilla Mission Indians of the Morongo Reservation, California
- Northfork Rancheria of Mono Indians of California
- Paiute-Shoshone Indians of the Bishop Community of the Bishop Colony, California
- Paiute-Shoshone Indians of the Lone Pine Community of the Lone Pine Reservation, California
- Pala Band of Luiseno Mission Indians of the Pala Reservation, California
- Paskenta Band of Nomlaki Indians of California
- Pauma Band of Luiseno Mission Indians of the Pauma & Yuima Reservation, California
- Pechanga Band of Indians
  (previously listed as Pechanga Band of Luiseno Mission Indians of the Pechanga Reservation, California)
- Picayune Rancheria of Chukchansi Indians of California
- Pinoleville Pomo Nation, California
  (previously listed as Pinoleville Rancheria of Pomo Indians of California)
- Pit River Tribe, California
  includes:
  - XL Ranch
  - Big Bend Rancheria
  - Likely Rancheria
  - Lookout Rancheria
  - Montgomery Creek Rancheria
  - Roaring Creek Rancheria
- Potter Valley Tribe, California
  (previously listed as Potter Valley Rancheria of Pomo Indians of California)
- Pulikla Tribe of Yurok People
  (previously listed as Resighini Rancheria, California; Coast Indian Community of Yurok Indians of the Resighini Rancheria)
- Quartz Valley Indian Community of the Quartz Valley Reservation of California
- Ramona Band or Village of Cahuilla Mission Indians of California
- Redding Rancheria, California
- Redwood Valley Rancheria of Pomo Indians of California
- Rincon Band of Luiseno Mission Indians of Rincon Reservation, California
  (previously listed as Rincon Band of Luiseno Indians)
- Robinson Rancheria of Pomo Indians of California
- Round Valley Indian Tribes of the Round Valley Reservation, California
  (previously listed as Covelo Indian Community)
- Rumsey Indian Rancheria of Wintun Indians of California
- San Pasqual Band of Diegueno Mission Indians of California
- Santa Rosa Band of Cahuilla Indians, California
  (previously listed as Santa Rosa Band of Cahuilla Mission Indians of the Santa Rosa Reservation)
- Santa Rosa Indian Community of the Santa Rosa Rancheria, California
- Santa Ynez Band of Chumash Mission Indians of the Santa Ynez Reservation, California
- Santa Ysabel Band of Diegueno Mission Indians of the Santa Ysabel Reservation, California
- Scotts Valley Band of Pomo Indians of California
- Sherwood Valley Rancheria of Pomo Indians of California
- Shingle Springs Band of Miwok Indians, Shingle Springs Rancheria (Verona Tract), California
- Smith River Rancheria, California
- Soboba Band of Luiseno Indians, California
  (previously listed as Soboba Band of Luiseno Mission Indians of the Soboba Reservation)
- Susanville Indian Rancheria, California
- Sycuan Band of the Kumeyaay Nation
  (previously listed as Sycuan Band of Diegueno Mission Indians of California)
- Table Mountain Rancheria of California
- Tejon Indian Tribe
- Torres Martinez Desert Cahuilla Indians, California
  (previously listed as Torres-Martinez Band of Cahuilla Mission Indians of California)
- Tule River Indian Tribe of the Tule River Reservation, California
- Tuolumne Band of Me-Wuk Indians of the Tuolumne Rancheria of California
- Twenty-Nine Palms Band of Mission Indians of California
- United Auburn Indian Community of the Auburn Rancheria of California
- Utu Utu Gwaitu Paiute Tribe of the Benton Paiute Reservation, California
- Wilton Rancheria
- Wiyot Tribe, California
  (previously listed as Table Bluff Reservation—Wiyot Tribe)
- Yuhaaviatam of San Manuel Nation
  (previously listed as San Manuel Band of Mission Indians, California; San Manuel Band of Serrano Mission Indians of the San Manuel Reservation, California)
- Yurok Tribe of the Yurok Reservation, California

Multiple states:

- Colorado River Indian Tribes of the Colorado River Indian Reservation, Arizona and California
- Fort Mojave Indian Tribe of Arizona, California & Nevada
- Quechan Tribe of the Fort Yuma Indian Reservation, California & Arizona
- Washoe Tribe of Nevada & California
  - Carson Colony
  - Dresslerville Colony
  - Woodfords Community
  - Stewart Community
  - Washoe Ranches

== Colorado ==
- Southern Ute Indian Tribe of the Southern Ute Reservation, Colorado

Multiple states:

- Ute Mountain Tribe of the Ute Mountain Reservation, Colorado, New Mexico & Utah

== Connecticut ==
- Mashantucket Pequot Tribe of Connecticut
- Mohegan Indian Tribe of Connecticut

== Delaware ==
No federally recognized tribes

== Florida ==
- Miccosukee Tribe of Indians
  (previously listed as Miccosukee Tribe of Indians of Florida)
- Seminole Tribe of Florida
  - Big Cypress Reservation
  - Brighton Reservation
  - Hollywood Reservation
  - Tampa Reservation

== Georgia ==
No federally recognized tribes

== Hawaii ==
No federally recognized tribes

== Idaho ==
- Coeur D'Alene Tribe, previously listed as Coeur D'Alene Tribe of the Coeur D'Alene Reservation, Idaho
- Kootenai Tribe of Idaho
- Nez Perce Tribe of Idaho
- Shoshone-Bannock Tribes of the Fort Hall Reservation
  (previously listed as Shoshone-Bannock Tribes of the Fort Hall Reservation of Idaho)

Multiple states:

- Shoshone-Paiute Tribes of the Duck Valley Reservation, Idaho and Nevada

== Illinois ==
Multiple states:

- Prairie Band of Potawatomi Nation

== Indiana ==
Multiple states:

- Pokagon Band of Potawatomi Indians, Michigan and Indiana

== Iowa ==
- Sac and Fox Tribe of the Mississippi in Iowa

== Kansas ==
- Kickapoo Tribe of Indians of the Kickapoo Reservation in Kansas

Multiple states:

- Iowa Tribe of Kansas and Nebraska
- Prairie Band of Potawatomi Nation
  (previously listed as Prairie Band of Potawatomi Indians)
- Sac and Fox Nation of Missouri in Kansas and Nebraska

== Kentucky ==
No federally recognized tribes

== Louisiana ==
- Chitimacha Tribe of Louisiana
- Coushatta Tribe of Louisiana
- Jena Band of Choctaw Indians
- Tunica-Biloxi Indian Tribe of Louisiana

== Maine ==
- Houlton Band of Maliseet Indians
  (previously listed as Houlton Band of Maliseet Indians of Maine)
- Mi'kmaq Nation
  (previously listed as Aroostook Band of Micmacs; Aroostook Band of Micmac Indians)
- Passamaquoddy Tribe
  (previously listed as Passamaquoddy Tribe of Maine)
- Penobscot Nation
  (previously listed as Penobscot Tribe of Maine)

== Maryland ==
No federally recognized tribes

== Massachusetts ==
- Mashpee Wampanoag Tribe, Massachusetts
- Wampanoag Tribe of Gay Head (Aquinnah) of Massachusetts
  (previously listed as Wampanoag Tribal Council of Gay Head, Inc.)

== Michigan ==
- Bay Mills Indian Community, Michigan
- Grand Traverse Band of Ottawa and Chippewa Indians, Michigan
- Hannahville Indian Community, Michigan
- Keweenaw Bay Indian Community, Michigan
- Lac Vieux Desert Band of Lake Superior Chippewa Indians, Michigan
- Little River Band of Ottawa Indians, Michigan
- Little Traverse Bay Bands of Odawa Indians, Michigan
- Match-e-be-nash-she-wish Band of Pottawatomi Indians of Michigan
  (previously listed as Gun Lake Indian Tribe)
  (previously listed as Gun Lake Village Band & Ottawa Colony Band of Grand River Ottawa Indians)
- Nottawaseppi Huron Band of the Potawatomi, Michigan
  (previously listed as Huron Potawatomi, Inc.)
- Saginaw Chippewa Indian Tribe of Michigan
- Sault Ste. Marie Tribe of Chippewa Indians, Michigan
  (previously listed as Sault Ste. Marie Tribe of Chippewa Indians of Michigan)

Multiple states:

- Pokagon Band of Potawatomi Indians, Michigan and Indiana

== Minnesota ==
- Lower Sioux Indian Community in the State of Minnesota
- Prairie Island Indian Community in the State of Minnesota
- Red Lake Band of Chippewa Indians, Minnesota
- Shakopee Mdewakanton Sioux Community of Minnesota
- Upper Sioux Community, Minnesota

Multiple states:

- Ho-Chunk Nation of Wisconsin (also in Minnesota)
  (previously listed as Wisconsin Winnebago Tribe)
- Minnesota Chippewa Tribe, Minnesota
  Six component reservations:
  - Bois Forte Band (Nett Lake)
  - Fond du Lac Band (also in Wisconsin)
  - Grand Portage Band
  - Leech Lake Band
  - Mille Lacs Band
  - White Earth Band

== Mississippi ==
Multiple states:

- Mississippi Band of Choctaw Indians

== Missouri ==
No federally recognized tribes

== Montana ==
- Assiniboine and Sioux Tribes of the Fort Peck Indian Reservation, Montana
- Blackfeet Tribe of the Blackfeet Indian Reservation of Montana
- Chippewa-Cree Indians of the Rocky Boy's Reservation, Montana
- Confederated Salish & Kootenai Tribes of the Flathead Reservation
- Crow Tribe of Montana
- Fort Belknap Indian Community of the Fort Belknap Reservation of Montana
- Little Shell Tribe of Chippewa Indians of Montana
- Northern Cheyenne Tribe of the Northern Cheyenne Indian Reservation, Montana

Multiple states:

- Turtle Mountain Band of Chippewa Indians of North Dakota (also in Montana and South Dakota)

== Nebraska ==
- Omaha Tribe of Nebraska
- Ponca Tribe of Nebraska
- Santee Sioux Nation, Nebraska
  (previously listed as Santee Sioux Tribe of the Santee Reservation of Nebraska)
- Winnebago Tribe of Nebraska

Multiple states:

- Iowa Tribe of Kansas and Nebraska
- Sac & Fox Nation of Missouri in Kansas and Nebraska

== Nevada ==
- Duckwater Shoshone Tribe of the Duckwater Reservation, Nevada
- Ely Shoshone Tribe of Nevada
- Las Vegas Tribe of Paiute Indians of the Las Vegas Indian Colony, Nevada
- Lovelock Paiute Tribe of the Lovelock Indian Colony, Nevada
- Moapa Band of Paiute Indians of the Moapa River Indian Reservation, Nevada
- Paiute-Shoshone Tribe of the Fallon Reservation and Colony, Nevada
- Pyramid Lake Paiute Tribe of the Pyramid Lake Reservation, Nevada
- Reno-Sparks Indian Colony, Nevada
- Summit Lake Paiute Tribe of Nevada
- Te-Moak Tribe of Western Shoshone Indians of Nevada
  Four constituent bands:
  - Battle Mountain Band
  - Elko Band
  - South Fork Band
  - Wells Band
- Walker River Paiute Tribe of the Walker River Reservation, Nevada
- Winnemucca Indian Colony of Nevada
- Yerington Paiute Tribe of the Yerington Colony & Campbell Ranch, Nevada
- Yomba Shoshone Tribe of the Yomba Reservation, Nevada

Multiple states:

- Confederated Tribes of the Goshute Reservation, Nevada and Utah
- Fort McDermitt Paiute and Shoshone Tribes of the Fort McDermitt Indian Reservation, Nevada and Oregon
- Fort Mojave Indian Tribe of Arizona, California & Nevada
- Shoshone-Paiute Tribes of the Duck Valley Reservation, Idaho and Nevada
- Washoe Tribe of Nevada & California
  - Carson Colony
  - Dresslerville Colony
  - Woodfords Community
  - Stewart Community
  - Washoe Ranches

== New Hampshire ==
No federally recognized tribes

== New Jersey ==
No federally recognized tribes

== New Mexico ==
- Jicarilla Apache Nation, New Mexico
  (previously listed as Jicarilla Apache Tribe of the Jicarilla Apache Indian Reservation)
- Mescalero Apache Tribe of the Mescalero Reservation, New Mexico
- Ohkay Owingeh, New Mexico
  (previously listed as Pueblo of San Juan)
- Pueblo of Acoma, New Mexico
- Pueblo of Cochiti, New Mexico
- Pueblo of Isleta, New Mexico
- Pueblo of Jemez, New Mexico
- Pueblo of Laguna, New Mexico
- Pueblo of Nambe, New Mexico
- Pueblo of Picuris, New Mexico
- Pueblo of Pojoaque, New Mexico
- Pueblo of San Felipe, New Mexico
- Pueblo of San Ildefonso, New Mexico
- Pueblo of Sandia, New Mexico
- Pueblo of Santa Ana, New Mexico
- Pueblo of Santa Clara, New Mexico
- Pueblo of Taos, New Mexico
- Pueblo of Tesuque, New Mexico
- Pueblo of Zia, New Mexico
- Santo Domingo Pueblo
  (previously listed as Kewa Pueblo, New Mexico and Pueblo of Santo Domingo)

Multiple states:

- Fort Sill Apache Tribe (also Oklahoma)
- Navajo Nation, Arizona, New Mexico & Utah
- Ute Mountain Tribe of the Ute Mountain Reservation, Colorado, New Mexico & Utah
- Zuni Tribe of the Zuni Reservation, New Mexico (also Arizona)

== New York ==
- Cayuga Nation
  (previously listed as Cayuga Nation of New York)
- Oneida Indian Nation
  (previously listed as Oneida Nation of New York)
- Onondaga Nation of New York
- Saint Regis Mohawk Tribe
  (previously listed as St. Regis Band of Mohawk Indians of New York)
- Seneca Nation of New York
- Shinnecock Nation
- Tonawanda Band of Seneca Indians of New York
- Tuscarora Nation of New York

== North Carolina ==
- Eastern Band of Cherokee Indians
  (previously listed as Eastern Band of Cherokee Indians of North Carolina)
- Lumbee Tribe of North Carolina

== North Dakota ==
- Spirit Lake Tribe, North Dakota
- Three Affiliated Tribes of the Fort Berthold Reservation, North Dakota

Multiple states:

- Standing Rock Sioux Tribe of North & South Dakota
- Turtle Mountain Band of Chippewa Indians of North Dakota (also in Montana and South Dakota)

== Ohio ==
No federally recognized tribes

== Oklahoma ==
- Absentee-Shawnee Tribe of Indians of Oklahoma
- Alabama-Quassarte Tribal Town
- Apache Tribe of Oklahoma
- Caddo Nation of Oklahoma
  (previously listed as Caddo Indian Tribe of Oklahoma)
- Cherokee Nation
- Cheyenne and Arapaho Tribes, Oklahoma
  (previously listed as Cheyenne-Arapaho Tribes of Oklahoma)
- Citizen Potawatomi Nation, Oklahoma
- Comanche Nation, Oklahoma
  (previously listed as Comanche Indian Tribe)
- Delaware Nation
  (previously listed as Delaware Tribe of Western Oklahoma)
- Delaware Tribe of Indians, Oklahoma
  (previously listed as Cherokee Delaware)
  (previously listed as Eastern Delaware)
- Eastern Shawnee Tribe of Oklahoma
- Fort Sill Apache Tribe of Oklahoma
- Iowa Tribe of Oklahoma
- Kaw Nation, Oklahoma
- Kialegee Tribal Town
- Kickapoo Tribe of Oklahoma
- Kiowa Indian Tribe of Oklahoma
- Miami Tribe of Oklahoma
- Modoc Nation (previously listed as Modoc Tribe of Oklahoma)
- Otoe-Missouria Tribe of Indians, Oklahoma
- Ottawa Tribe of Oklahoma
- Pawnee Nation of Oklahoma
- Peoria Tribe of Indians of Oklahoma
- Ponca Tribe of Indians of Oklahoma
- Quapaw Nation (previously listed as Quapaw Tribe of Indians)
- Sac & Fox Nation, Oklahoma
- Seneca-Cayuga Tribe of Oklahoma
- Shawnee Tribe
- The Chickasaw Nation
- The Choctaw Nation of Oklahoma
- The Muscogee (Creek) Nation
- The Osage Nation
  (previously listed as Osage Tribe of Oklahoma)
- The Seminole Nation of Oklahoma
- Thlopthlocco Tribal Town, Oklahoma
- Tonkawa Tribe of Indians of Oklahoma
- United Keetoowah Band of Cherokee Indians in Oklahoma
- Wichita and Affiliated Tribes (Wichita, Keechi, Waco & Tawakonie), Oklahoma
- Wyandotte Nation

== Oregon ==
- Burns Paiute Tribe
- Confederated Tribes of Coos, Lower Umpqua and Siuslaw Indians
- Confederated Tribes of the Grand Ronde Community of Oregon
- Confederated Tribes of Siletz Indians
- Confederated Tribes of the Umatilla Indian Reservation
- Confederated Tribes of Warm Springs
- Coquille Indian Tribe
- Cow Creek Band of Umpqua Tribe of Indians
- Klamath Tribes

Multiple states:

- Fort McDermitt Paiute and Shoshone Tribe

== Pennsylvania ==
No federally recognized tribes

== Rhode Island ==
- Narragansett Indian Tribe of Rhode Island

== South Carolina ==
- Catawba Indian Nation
  (previously listed as Catawba Tribe of South Carolina)

== South Dakota ==
- Cheyenne River Sioux Tribe of the Cheyenne River Reservation, South Dakota
- Crow Creek Sioux Tribe of the Crow Creek Reservation, South Dakota
- Flandreau Santee Sioux Tribe of South Dakota
- Lower Brule Sioux Tribe of the Lower Brule Reservation, South Dakota
- Oglala Sioux Tribe of the Pine Ridge Reservation, South Dakota
- Rosebud Sioux Tribe of the Rosebud Indian Reservation, South Dakota
- Sisseton-Wahpeton Oyate of the Lake Traverse Reservation, South Dakota
- Yankton Sioux Tribe of South Dakota

Multiple states:

- Standing Rock Sioux Tribe of North & South Dakota
- Turtle Mountain Band of Chippewa Indians of North Dakota (also in Montana and South Dakota)

== Tennessee ==
Multiple states:

- Mississippi Band of Choctaw Indians

== Texas ==
- Alabama-Coushatta Tribes of Texas
- Kickapoo Traditional Tribe of Texas
  (previously listed as Texas Band of Traditional Kickapoo)
- Ysleta Del Sur Pueblo of Texas

== Utah ==
- Northwestern Band of Shoshoni Nation of Utah (Washakie)
- Paiute Indian Tribe of Utah
  - Cedar City Band of Paiutes
  - Kanosh Band of Paiutes
  - Koosharem Band of Paiutes
  - Indian Peaks Band of Paiutes
  - Shivwits Band of Paiutes
- Skull Valley Band of Goshute Indians of Utah
- Ute Indian Tribe of the Uintah & Ouray Reservation, Utah

Multiple states:

- Confederated Tribes of the Goshute Reservation, Nevada and Utah
- Navajo Nation, Arizona, New Mexico & Utah
- Ute Mountain Tribe of the Ute Mountain Reservation, Colorado, New Mexico & Utah

== Vermont ==
No federally recognized tribes

== Virginia ==
- Chickahominy Indian Tribe
- Chickahominy Indian Tribe–Eastern Division
- Monacan Indian Nation
- Nansemond Indian Nation
- Pamunkey Indian Tribe
- Rappahannock Tribe, Inc.
- Upper Mattaponi Tribe

== Washington ==
- Confederated Tribes of the Chehalis Reservation
- Confederated Tribes of the Colville Reservation
- Confederated Tribes and Bands of the Yakama Nation
  (previously the Confederated Tribes and Bands of the Yakama Indian Nation of the Yakama Reservation)
- Cowlitz Indian Tribe
- Hoh Indian Tribe
  (previously listed as Hoh Indian Tribe of the Hoh Indian Reservation, Washington)
- Jamestown S'Klallam Tribe
  (previously listed as Jamestown S'Klallam Tribe of Washington)
- Kalispel Indian Community of the Kalispel Reservation
- Lower Elwha Tribal Community
  (previously listed as Lower Elwha Tribal Community of the Lower Elwha Reservation, Washington)
- Lummi Tribe of the Lummi Reservation
- Makah Indian Tribe of the Makah Indian Reservation
- Muckleshoot Indian Tribe
  (previously listed as Muckleshoot Indian Tribe of the Muckleshoot Reservation, Washington)
- Nisqually Indian Tribe
  (previously listed as Nisqually Indian Tribe of the Nisqually Reservation, Washington)
- Nooksack Indian Tribe
  (previously listed as Nooksack Indian Tribe of Washington)
- Port Gamble S'Klallam Tribe
  (previously listed as Port Gamble Band of S'Klallam Indians; Port Gamble Indian Community of the Port Gamble Reservation, Washington)
- Puyallup Tribe of the Puyallup Reservation
  (previously listed as Puyallup Tribe of the Puyallup Reservation, Washington)
- Quileute Tribe of the Quileute Reservation
  (previously listed as Quileute Tribe of the Quileute Reservation, Washington)
- Quinault Indian Nation
  (previously listed as Quinault Tribe of the Quinault Reservation, Washington)
- Samish Indian Nation
  (previously listed as Samish Indian Tribe, Washington)
- Sauk-Suiattle Indian Tribe of Washington
- Shoalwater Bay Indian Tribe of the Shoalwater Bay Indian Reservation
  (previously listed as Shoalwater Bay Tribe of the Shoalwater Bay Indian Reservation, Washington)
- Skokomish Indian Tribe of the Skokomish Reservation, Washington
- Snoqualmie Indian Tribe
  (previously listed as Snoqualmie Tribe, Washington)
- Spokane Tribe of the Spokane Reservation
- Squaxin Island Tribe of the Squaxin Island Reservation
  (previously listed as Squaxin Island Tribe of the Squaxin Island Reservation, Washington)
- Stillaguamish Tribe of Washington
- Suquamish Indian Tribe of the Port Madison Reservation, Washington
- Swinomish Indians of the Swinomish Reservation, Washington
- Tulalip Tribes of Washington
  (previously listed as Tulalip Tribes of the Tulalip Reservation, Washington)
- Upper Skagit Indian Tribe
  (previously listed as Upper Skagit Indian Tribe of Washington)

== West Virginia ==
No federally recognized tribes

== Wisconsin ==
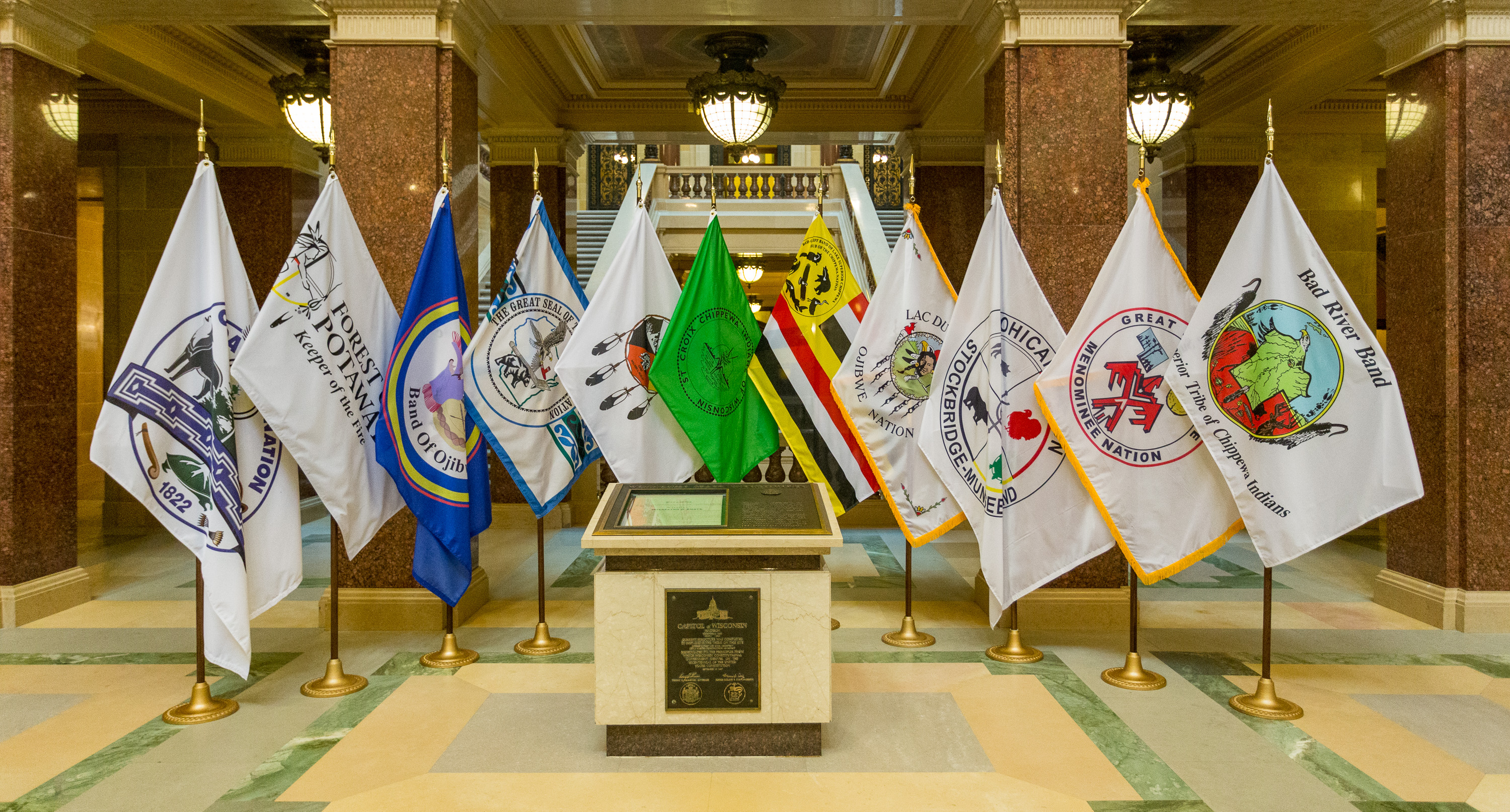
Flags of Wisconsin tribes in the state capitol

- Bad River Band of the Lake Superior Tribe of Chippewa Indians of the Bad River Reservation, Wisconsin
- Forest County Potawatomi Community, Wisconsin
- Lac Courte Oreilles Band of Lake Superior Chippewa Indians of Wisconsin
- Lac du Flambeau Band of Lake Superior Chippewa Indians of the Lac du Flambeau Reservation of Wisconsin
- Menominee Indian Tribe of Wisconsin
- Oneida Nation
  (previously listed as Oneida Tribe of Indians of Wisconsin)
- Red Cliff Band of Lake Superior Chippewa Indians of Wisconsin
- St. Croix Chippewa Indians of Wisconsin
- Sokaogon Chippewa Community, Wisconsin
- Stockbridge Munsee Community, Wisconsin

Multiple states:

- Ho-Chunk Nation of Wisconsin (also in Minnesota)
  (previously listed as Wisconsin Winnebago Tribe)
- Minnesota Chippewa Tribe, Minnesota
  - Fond du Lac Band (also in Wisconsin)

== Wyoming ==
- Arapahoe Tribe of the Wind River Reservation, Wyoming
- Shoshone Tribe of the Wind River Reservation, Wyoming

== See also ==
- Classification of the Indigenous peoples of the Americas

Native Americans in the United States

- Federally recognized tribes, continental United States
- List of Alaska Native tribal entities
- List of Indian reservations in the United States
  - List of historical Indian reservations in the United States
- State recognized tribes in the United States
- Organizations that self-identify as Native American tribes

Indigenous peoples in Canada

- List of Indian reserves in Canada
- List of First Nations governments
- List of First Nations peoples
- Inuit
- Métis
