= AIAN (U.S. Census) =

AIAN (for American Indian and Alaska Native Resources) is an abbreviation used by the United States Census Bureau to count population within the American Indian and Alaska Natives areas within the United States. The US Census uses other abbreviations such as CDP or census-designated places as well in determining populations within different states.

== AIAN of U.S. States ==
=== Alabama ===
- Cher-O-Creek SDTSA
- Cherokee Tribe of Northeast Alabama
- Echota Cherokee Tribe of Alabama
- MaChis Lower Creek SDTSA
- MOWA Choctaw (state) Reservation
- Poarch Creek Indian Reservation and Off-Reservation Trust Land
- Star Muskogee Creek SDTSA
- United Cherokee Ani-Yun-Wiya Nation SDTSA

=== Alaska ===
- see List of Alaska Native tribal entities

=== Arizona ===
- 21 AIAN areas

=== California ===
- Alturas Indian Rancheria
- Auburn Rancheria
- Agua Caliente Indian Reservation
- Augustine Reservation
- Barona Reservation
- Benton Reservation
- Berry Creek Rancheria
- Big Bend Rancheria
- Big Lagoon Rancheria
- Big Pine Reservation (Paiute Tribe of Owens Valley)
- Big Sandy Rancheria
- Bishop Paiute Tribe
- Blue Lake Rancheria & Off-Reservation Trust Land
- Bridgeport Reservation
- Cabazon Reservation
- Cahuilla Reservation
- Campo Indian Reservation
- Capitan Grande Reservation
- Cedarville Rancheria
- Chemehuevi Reservation
- Chicken Ranch Rancheria
- Cold Springs Rancheria
- Colorado River Indian Reservation
- Colusa Indian Rancheria
- Cortina Indian Rancheria
- Coyote Valley Rancheria
- Dry Creek Rancheria
- Elk Valley Rancheria
- Enterprise Rancheria
- Ewiiaapaayp Reservation
- Fort Bidwell Reservation
- Fort Independence Reservation (Paiute Tribe)
- Fort Mojave Indian Reservation
- Fort Yuma Indian Reservation
- Greenville Rancheria (Maidu Indians)
- Grindstone Rancheria
- Guidiville Rancheria
- Hoopa Valley Reservation
- Hopland Rancheria
- Ione Band of Miwok TDSA
- Inaja and Cosmit Reservation
- Jamul Indian Village
- Karuk Reservation & Off-Reservation Trust Land
- Laytonville Rancheria
- La Jolla Reservation
- La Posta Indian Reservation
- Likely Rancheria
- Lone Pine Reservation (Paiute-Shoshone Tribe)
- Los Coyotes Reservation
- Lookout Rancheria
- Manchester-Point Arena Rancheria
- Manzanita Reservation
- Mesa Grande Reservation
- Montgomery Creek Rancheria
- Morongo Reservation
- Northfork Rancheria of Mono Indians of California
- Pala Indian Reservation
- Paskenta Rancheria
- Pauma and Yuima Reservation
- Pechanga Reservation
- Picayune Rancheria of Chukchansi Indians
- Pinoleville Rancheria
- Quartz Valley Reservation
- Redding Rancheria
- Redwood Valley Rancheria
- Resighini Rancheria
- Rincon Reservation
- Roaring Creek Rancheria
- Rohnerville Rancheria
- Romona Village
- Round Valley Reservation
- Rumsey Indian Rancheria
- San Manuel Reservation
- San Pasqual Reservation
- Santa Rosa Rancheria
- Santa Rosa Reservation
- Santa Ynez Reservation
- Santa Ysabel Reservation
- Sherwood Valley Rancheria
- Shingle Springs Rancheria
- Soboba Reservation
- Smith River Rancheria
- Stewarts Point Rancheria
- Susanville Indian Rancheria
- Sycuan Reservation
- Table Bluff Reservation (Wiyot Tribe)
- Table Mountain Rancheria
- Timbi-Sha Shoshone Reservation
- Torres-Martinez Reservation (Desert Cahuilla Indians)
- Trinidad Rancheria
- Tule River Reservation
- Tuolumne Rancheria
- Twenty-Nine Reservation
- Viejas Reservation
- Woodsford Community
- XL Ranch Rancheria
- Yurok Indian Reservation
- 8 more AIAN areas

=== Colorado ===
- 2 AIAN areas

=== Connecticut ===
- 5 AIAN areas

=== Delaware ===
- 2 AIAN areas

=== Florida ===
- 10 AIAN areas

=== Georgia ===
- 1 AIAN areas

=== Hawaii ===
- 76 AIAN areas

=== Idaho ===
- 5 AIAN areas

=== Iowa ===
- Sac and Fox/Meskwaki Settlement

=== Kansas ===
- 5 AIAN areas

=== Louisiana ===
- 9 AIAN areas

=== Maine ===
- 6 AIAN areas

=== Massachusetts ===
- 2 AIAN areas

=== Michigan ===
- 13 AIAN areas

=== Minnesota ===
- 13 AIAN areas

=== Mississippi ===
- 1 AIAN areas

=== Montana ===
- 8 AIAN areas

=== Nebraska ===
- 7 AIAN areas

=== Nevada ===
- 28 AIAN areas

=== New Jersey ===
- 2 AIAN areas

=== New Mexico ===
- 25 AIAN areas

=== New York ===
- 11 AIAN areas

=== North Carolina ===
- 8 AIAN areas

=== North Dakota ===
- 5 AIAN areas

=== Oklahoma ===
- 30 AIAN areas

=== Oregon ===
- 11 AIAN areas

=== Rhode Island ===
- 1 AIAN areas

=== South Carolina ===
- 7 AIAN areas

=== South Dakota ===
- 11 AIAN areas

=== Texas ===
- 3 AIAN areas

=== Utah ===
- 7 AIAN areas

=== Virginia ===
- 4 AIAN areas

=== Washington ===
- 28 AIAN areas

=== Wisconsin ===
- 12 AIAN areas

=== Wyoming ===
- 1 AIAN areas
