= Jackson Rancheria Casino Resort =

American Indian casino in California

- Location within California
- Interactive map of Jackson Rancheria Casino Resort
- Location: Jackson, California; 12222 New York Ranch Road; 38°23′11″N 120°44′1″W
- Opened: 1991; 35 years ago
- Gaming space: 257,000 sq ft (23,900 m^{2})
- Casino type: Land
- Website: jacksoncasino.com

The Jackson Rancheria Casino Resort is a hotel, casino, and resort with restaurants, owned and operated by the Jackson Rancheria Band of Miwuk Indians, and located just outside of Jackson, California.
