= Potter Valley Tribe =

Total population
- 200

Regions with significant populations
- United States (California)

Languages
- English, Pomoan languages

Religion
- Roundhouse religion, Christianity, Kuksu

Related ethnic groups
- Pomo tribes

The Potter Valley Tribe is a federally recognized tribe of Pomo people in Mendocino County, California. They were previously known as the Little River Band of Pomo Indians and Potter Valley Rancheria of Pomo Indians of California. The tribe is descended from the first-known inhabitants of the valley, which the Pomo called Ba-lo Kai. Europeans first settled there, at the headwaters of the East Fork of the Russian River, in 1852.

== History ==
In 1958, Congress passed the first "Rancheria Act," and 41 Rancherias in California were terminated. Throughout California, 7,601 acres of trust lands were terminated, and 1,330 Native people killed. The Potter Valley Rancheria was formally terminated on 1 August 1961. This revoked the Tribe's federal status, excluded members from further assistance as Indians, and distributed land assignments to eligible members. This placed the land in fee simple status, allowing members to live on or dispose of the property ? and be subject to property taxes for the first time in history. One 10 acre parcel purchased in 1892 continued to be occupied by Potter Valley Pomo Indians and their descendants. Properties of the original Rancheria were sold over the years; there are only one or two properties still belonging to the descendants of the Indians who lived there. The Rancheria is still erroneously shown on road maps.

In 1979, tribes throughout northern California counties sued in the United States District Court. The lawsuit alleged that the federal government had illegally terminated 17 Indian tribes. This lawsuit, Tillie Hardwick, et al. v. United States, U.S. Dist. Court, Northern Dist. of California, No. C-79-1710-SW, has become noteworthy in northern California. The Potter Valley Tribe, and other California tribes, are often referred to as "Tillie Hardwick Tribes."

On 2 March 1993 the Potter Valley Rancheria adopted a constitution and by-laws, establishing a Tribal Council and assuming governmental functions. The Potter Valley Tribe presently has an on-reservation service population of 31 people.

== Records ==
The majority of records of individuals were those created by the agencies. Some records may be available to tribal members through the tribal headquarters. They were (and are) the local office of the Bureau of Indian Affairs (BIA), and were charged with maintaining records of the activities of those under their responsibility.

== Reservation ==
The Potter Valley Tribe's reservation is the Potter Valley Rancheria, which is 10 acres (40,000 m^{2}) large. 138 tribal members live on the reservation. The Rancheria is situated in the western slope of Potter Valley. The Potter Valley Tribe is located at the address of 2251 South State Street Ukiah, CA 95482.

In the early 20th century, the Rancheria was a village of 11 houses with 50 residents. They came from all villages all over the valley, including the Yukian Huchnom band. The Methodist Episcopal church maintained a village school for the reservation.

== Government ==
The tribe conducts business from Ukiah, California. The current tribal administration is:

- Salvador Rosales, Tribal Chairperson
- Losario Rosales, Treasurer
- Rosemary Rahmaoui, Secretary

== See also ==
- Pomo people
