= Manchester Band of Pomo Indians of the Manchester Rancheria =

Native American tribe in California

Coordinates: 38°56′08″N 123°40′57″W

Total population
- 800+ actively enrolled Members, Estimated at 1300

Regions with significant populations
- Manchester-Point Arena, Northern California, United States.

Languages
- English, Central Pomo languages (Hokan phylum)

Related ethnic groups
- Pomo tribes

The Manchester Band of Pomo Indians of the Manchester Rancheria, formerly named the Manchester Band of Pomo Indians of the Manchester-Point Arena Rancheria, is a federally recognized tribe of Pomo Indians in California. The tribe is a community of Pomo Native Americans who are native to Northern California. The Bokeya society are enrolled in the Manchester Band of Pomo with the approval of their constitution and by-laws in 1936.

== The Rancheria ==
The tribe's reservation is split into Manchester and Point Arena lands. The coordinates for Manchester Point Arena community: 38°56'11.4"N 123°40'58.5"W The Bokeya was the largest Pomo tribelet in terms of territorial area. Formerly, a bridge connected these tribal lands. Point Arena in Mendocino County, California. Now, the size of the rancheria is 364 acres (1.47 km^{2}).

== Government ==
The Bokeya residential unit was headed by kin-group chief, and the position was passed on through a hereditary lineage. Ceremonial chiefs held more authority than the kin-group chiefs. In the aftermath of Bokeya congregation during the rancheria period (1900–1935), there weren't fixed leaders. However, toward the end of this period, a system of voting was introduced for the selection of leaders. The Bokeya voted to accept the 1934 Indian Reorganization Act (IRA). The Bokeya framed a constitution, by-laws, and corporate charter, which was approved in 1936. They formed a Community Council to assume the official roles, and also formed a Business Committee to operate the ranch as a chartered corporation. The officers are elected once a year via democratic process.

=== Structure of Current Community Council ===
- Chairwomen: Tisha Jones
- Vice Chairmen: Joshua Kerby
- Secretary: Vacant
- Treasurer: Paula Figueroa

== Constitution ==
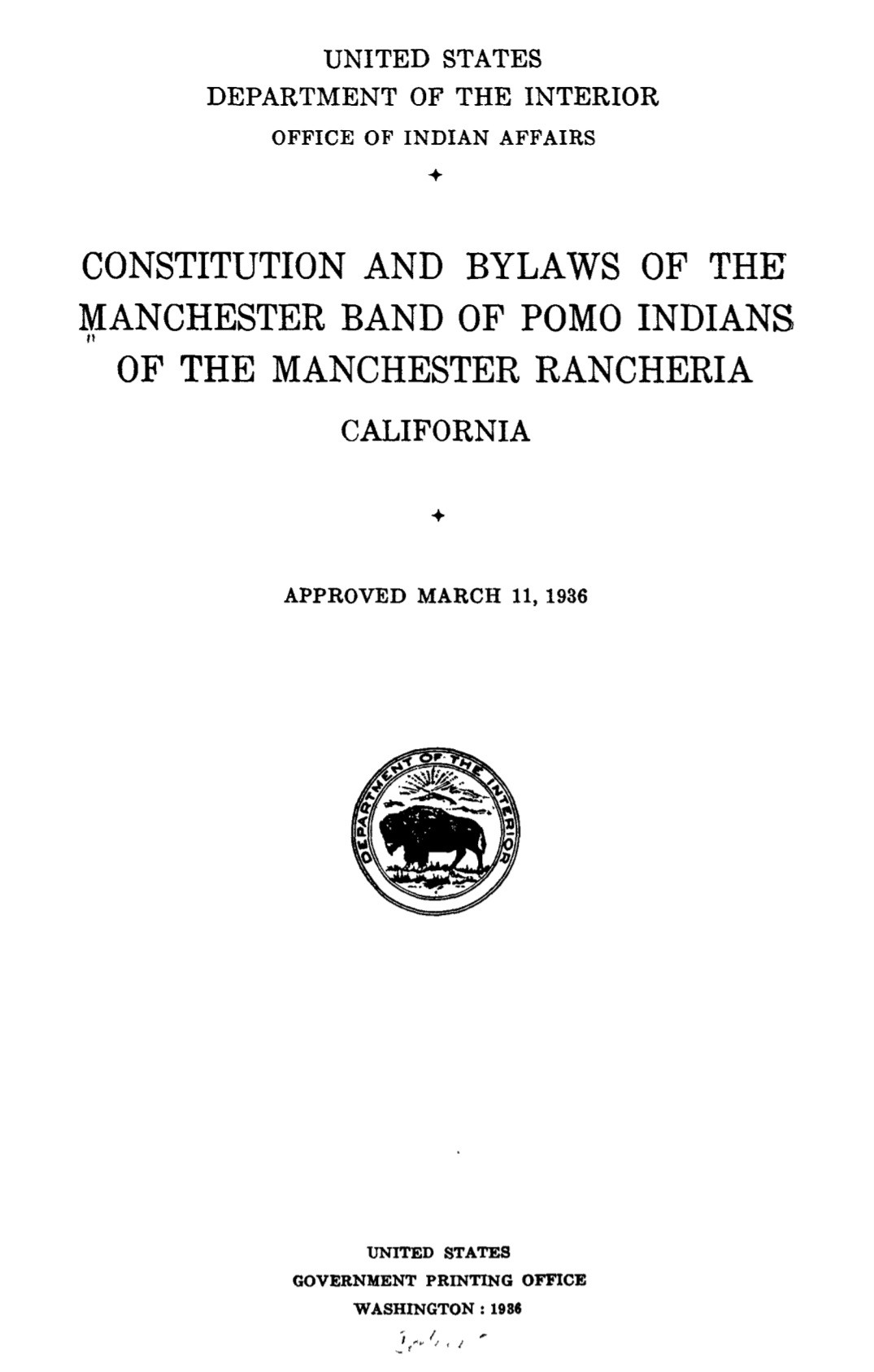
Constitution and By-laws

They are one of the few Native American bands who have a written Constitution that is available for the public. After the ratification of Indian Reorganization Act (IRA) in 1934, the Bokeya framed the Constitution and By-Laws. This document provided them jurisdiction over rancheria land as it was written to establish a legal rancheria organization and secure certain privileges and powers offered to the Indians by the IRA. The document has five articles:

- ARTICLE I—TERRITORY: Jurisdiction of Manchester Band of Pomo Indians extend to the territory within the confines of the Manchester Rancheria, and lands added.
- ARTICLE II—MEMBERSHIP: Section 1: All persons of Indian blood whose names appear on the official census rolls of the band as of April 1, 1935, and all children born to any member of the band who is a resident of the Rancheria at the time of the birth of said children. Section 2: The community council shall have the power to promulgate ordinances, subject to review by the Secretary of the Interior, covering future membership and the adoption of new members.
- ARTICLE III—GOVERNING BODY: Section 1: The governing body of the Manchester Band of Pomo Indians shall be the community council which shall be composed of all qualified voters of the band. A majority of the eligible voters shall constitute a quorum. Section 2: All enrolled members of the Manchester Band of Pomo Indians who are 21 years of age or over, and who have maintained legal residence on the Rancheria for a period of 1 year immediately prior to any election, are qualified voters at such election. Such residence, however, shall not be required as a qualification for voting upon amendments to the constitution and attached bylaws. Section 3: The Community Council shall elect from its own members, by secret ballot, (a) chairman; (b) vice chairman; (c) secretary; (d) treasurer; (e) and such other officers and committees as may be deemed necessary. Section 4: The community council shall meet on the second Saturday of May and November. The officers elected at this meeting shall serve until the July meeting at which time their successors shall be chosen. Thereafter, officials shall be chosen at the July meeting. Section 5: The chairman, or 25 percent of the qualified voters, may, by written notice, call special meetings of the community council. Section 6: The business committee shall consist of the chairman, secretary, and treasurer of the community council, and shall perform such duties as may be authorized by that council.
- ARTICLE IV—POWERS OF THE COMMUNITY COUNCIL: Section 1: Enumerated powers—The community council of the Manchester Band of Pomo Indians shall exercise the following powers, subject to any limitations imposed by the statutes or the Constitution of the United States: To negotiate with the Federal, State, and local governments; to employ legal counsel; to veto any sale, disposition, lease, or encumbrance of tribal lands, interests in lands, or other tribal assets of the band; to advise Secretary of the interior with regard to all appropriation estimates or Federal projects for the benefit of the Manchester Rancheraia; to manage all economic affairs and enterprises of the Manchester Band of Pomo Indians; to promulgate and enforce ordinances; to charter subordinate organizations for economic purposes and to delegate to such organizations any of the foregoing powers, reserving the right to review any action taken by virtue of such delegated power; to adopt resolutions not inconsistent with this constitution and the attached bylaws. Section 2: Future powers.—The community council may exercise such further powers as may in the future be delegated to the council by members of the band. Section 3: Reserved powers.—Any rights and powers heretofore vested in the Manchester Band of Pomo Indians, but not expressly referred to in this constitution shall not be abridged by this article, but may be exercised by the people of the Manchester Band of Pomo Indians through the adoption of appropriate bylaws and constitutional amendments. Section 4: Manner of review.—Any resolution or ordinance which by the terms of this constitution, is subject to review by the Secretary of the Interior, shall be presented to the superintendent in charge of the rancheria, who shall, within 10 days thereafter, approve or disapprove the same.
- ARTICLE V—AMENDMENTS: Section 1: This constitution and bylaws may be amended by a majority vote of the qualified voters of the band voting at an election called for that purpose. Section 2: At any regular or special community council meeting, amendments to this constitution and bylaws may be proposed.

== Corporate charter ==
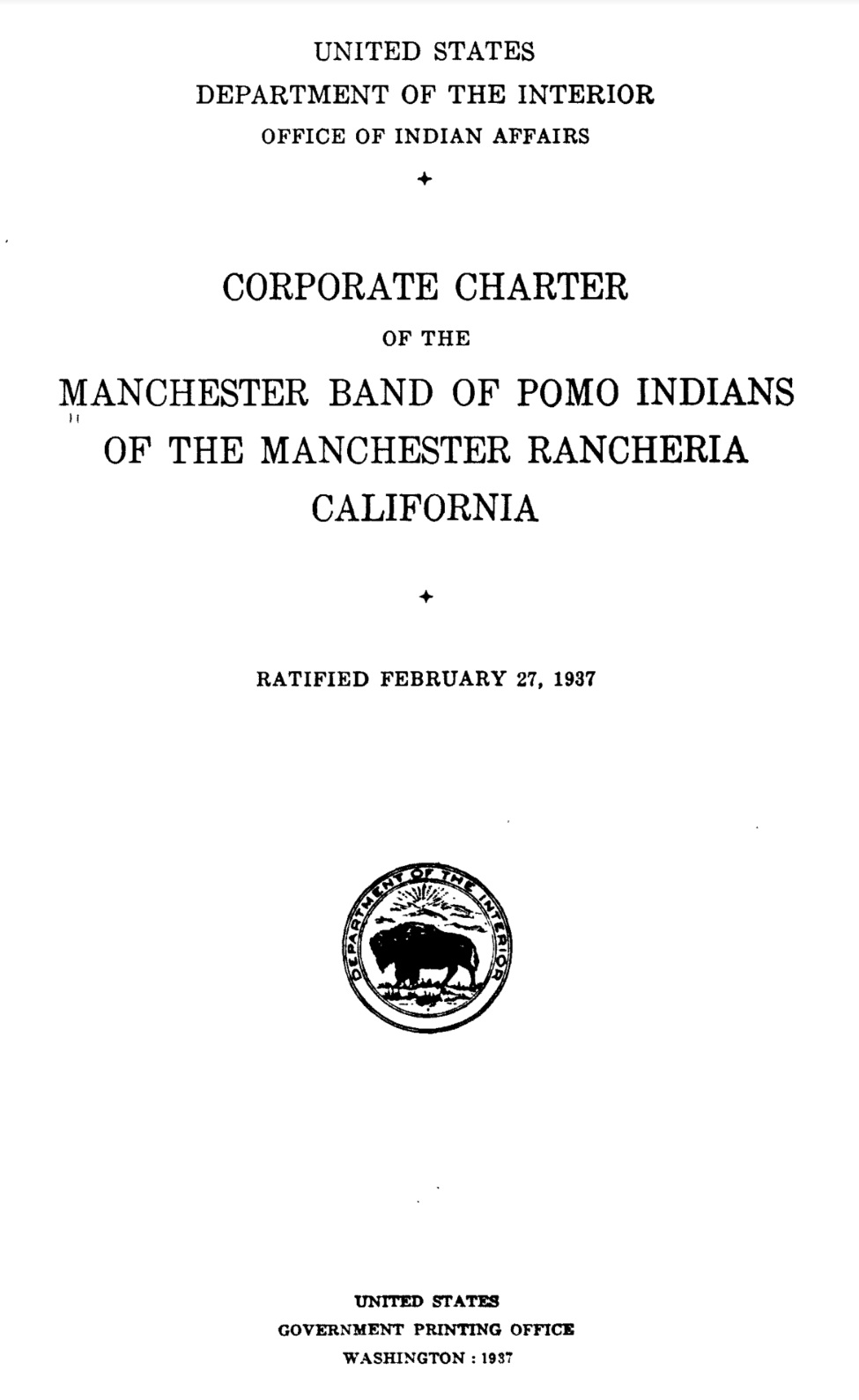
Corporate Charter

For a proposal to be ratified, it requires a majority vote of the adult Indians living on the Rancheria at an election in which at least 30 percent of the eligible voters vote.

- Corporate Existence and Purposes: The corporate charter was ratified to further the economic development of the Manchester Band of Pomo Indians of the Manchester Rancheria to further the economic development of the Manchester Band of Pomo Indians of the Manchester Rancheria.
- Perpetual Succession Membership: The Manchester Band of Pomo Indians shall, as a Federal corporation, have perpetual succession. The Manchester Band of Pomo Indians shall be a membership corporation. Its members shall consist of all persons now or hereafter members of the Band.
- Management: The Manchester Community Council established in accordance with the said Constitution and By-laws of the Band, shall exercise all the corporate powers.
- Corporate Powers: The Band, subject to any restrictions contained in the Constitution and laws of the United States, or in the Constitution and By-laws of the said Band, shall have the following corporate powers, in addition to all powers already conferred or guaranteed by the Band's Constitution and By-laws: to adopt, use, and alter at its pleasure a corporate seal; to purchase, take by gift, bequest, or otherwise, own, hold, manage, operate, and dispose of property of every description, real and personal.
- Termination of Supervisory Powers: Upon request of the Manchester Community Council for the termination of any supervisory power reserved to the Secretary of the Interior, ratified by the Band with at least 30% vote.
- Corporate Powers: No property rights of the Manchester Band of Pomo Indians shall be in any way impaired by anything contained in this Charter.
- Corporate Dividends: The Band may issue to each of its members a nontransferable certificate of membership evidencing the equal share of each member in the assets of the Band.
- Corporate Accounts: The officers of the Band shall maintain accurate and complete public accounts of the financial affairs of the Band, which shall clearly show all credits, debts, pledges, and assignments, and shall furnish an annual balance sheet and report of the financial affairs of the Band to the Commissioner of Indian Affairs.

== Language ==
The Central Pomo are culturally identified as a Pomo dialect group. The language is under Hokan family. In pre-contact times, the Pomoan languages together probably had around 8000 speakers (Kroeber 1925). Today, there are several speakers of Central Pomo (Golla 2011).

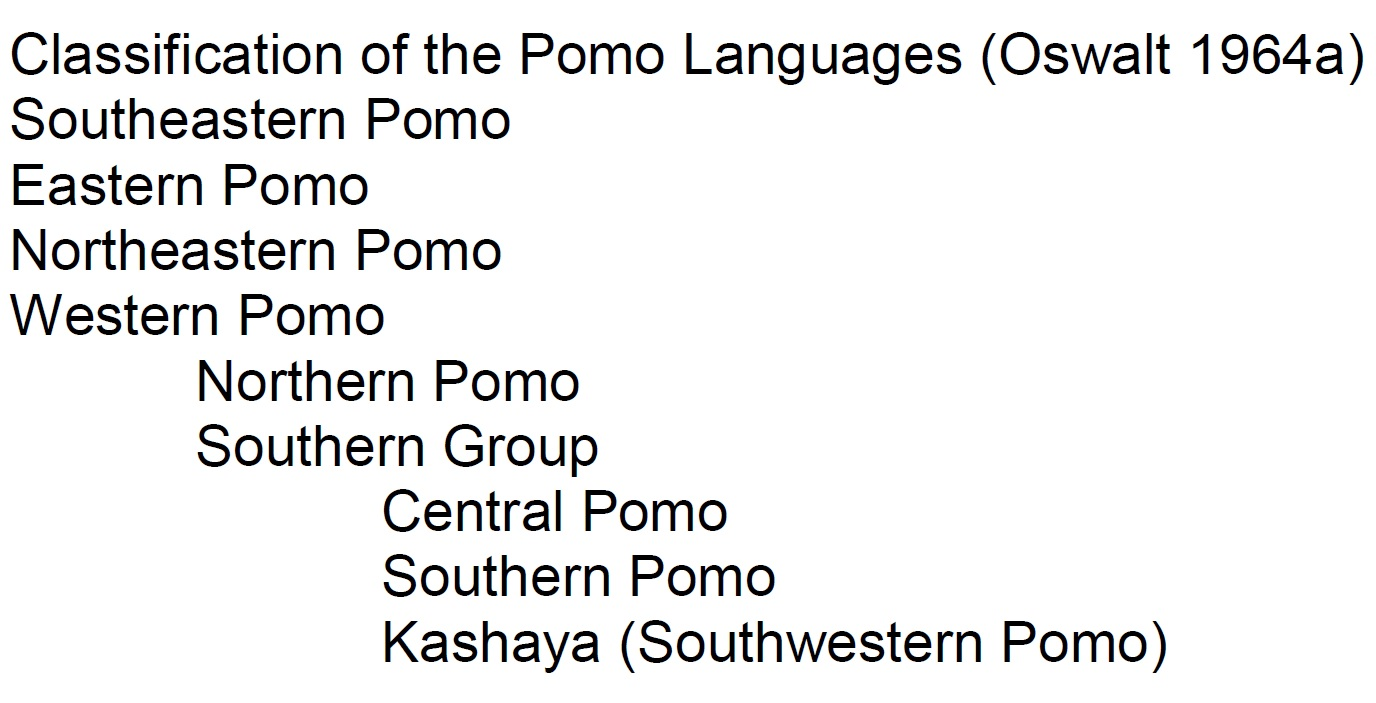
Branching

== Economy, culture, and religion ==
Since they are part of larger Pomo people, their cultural practices are similar to that of the larger band they are part of. Each Bokeya kin-group had a men's assembly house where "ghost ceremonies" were performed. These ceremonies were associated with their "secret society" and the intent was social integration. Professions such as hunting, fishing, and healing were considered prestigious. Shamans were responsible for driving away individual sickness, and sickness of the community as a whole. They were self-sufficient from the resources from the ocean, rivers, and the forests. They strongly followed a protocol of utilizing the resources, and were sensitive to external people using their resources. They did not completely oppose the idea of sharing resources, but they were strict about following a proper protocol. They had a proper system of exchange and trade. When they had superabundance, feasts were organized among the trade allies. They heavily believed in the "dreamers" and their dreams that decided religion and ceremonies. The ceremonies were conducted in the dance house. The dream songs were used to suck illness out of the individuals and the society.

Post-contact, Bokeya earned living by partially following traditional methods, and partially by participation in the settlers' way of living. They cultivated lands, grew crops to sell, charged fees on people going to rancheria to fish, and also by working in the logging industries and road work. Post IRA, they obtained a loan of $5000 to start ranch. Due to internal and external conflicts, the ranch failed and was unable to pay the workers. After the failure of the ranch, they returned to their rancheria status. However, they still practiced certain "ceremonial festivities and curing practices".

.

== Court cases ==
Manchester Band of Pomo Indians vs united States. The Manchester Band of Pomo Indians filed a class action lawsuit against the "United States of America and certain officers of the Interior and Treasury Departments" on November 18, 1968, for improper handling of tribal funds. After unsuccessful efforts to convene a three-judge court, the case was reassigned in early 1972. Finally, after the defendants' failure to comply with the Court's order, the Court established the charges against the defendants to be true.

== Casino ==
The tribal-State gaming compact was signed on 8 October 1999. There is a gaming agency that overlooks the legal aspects of the casino.

This tribe has its own casino. The Garcia River Casino is located on the Point Arena Rancheria. The casino is small and does not have table games except for a black jack table which has an electronic host. The most games are Slots 1c-$.

== Healthcare ==
Healthcare to the tribe is provided by a satellite clinic of the Sonoma County Indian Health Project.

In addition to the health services, the program provides education on prevention of injuries, HIV/AIDS, teen pregnancy, and suicide.

The Mission: "To continually improve and maintain a comprehensive healthcare system to serve the needs and traditional values of our American Indian Community."
