= Utu Utu Gwaitu Paiute Tribe of the Benton Paiute Reservation =

Utu Utu Gwaitu Paiute Tribe
Utuʼutuwi·tu (Mono)

Total population
- 84 (1991)

Regions with significant populations
- United States (California)

Languages
- English

Religion
- traditional tribal religion, Christianity, Sun Dance, Native American Church

Related ethnic groups
- Western Mono

The Utu Utu Gwaitu Paiute Tribe of the Benton Paiute Reservation, also known as the Benton Paiute Tribe (Mono: Utuʼutuwi·tu), is a federally recognized Great Basin tribe in Mono County, California.

== Reservation ==
Location of Benton Paiute Reservation

The Utu Utu Gwaitu Paiute Tribe has a federal reservation in Mono County, ten miles (16 km) from the Nevada border called the Benton Paiute Reservation (37°47′22″N 118°31′19″W) in Benton, California. The reservation is 400 acres (1.6 km^{2}) large that is held in Trustee status and another 67 acres held in fee simple status. Approximately 50 tribal members on the reservation. The reservation was established on July 22, 1915. The tribe owns and operates the Benton Crossing Cafe in nearby Benton, California. The nearest incorporated city is Bishop, which lies about 40 miles (64 km) to the south. About the same distance to the west is Mammoth Lakes, although there is no direct road leading there.

== Government ==
The tribe's headquarters is located in Benton, California. The tribe is governed by a democratically elected, five-person tribal council.

The tribe identifies as being Owens Valley Paiute. Tribal enrollment is open to people with one-quarter Paiute blood quantum, either from the Benton area or descended from original enrollees. Other Owens Valley Paiute can be adopted into the tribe, as approved by a five-person enrollment committee.

The current tribal administration is as follows:

- Chairwoman: Tina Braithwaite
- Vice-chairman: Shane Saulque
- Secretary/Treasurer: Vacant
- Council Person: Michelle Saulque
- Council Member: Cecil Rambeau
- Chief Arbitrator: Joseph Saulque

At the beginning of 2010, the tribe was awarded a $200,000 grant from the US Department of Energy for a study of the feasibility of geothermal energy development on tribal lands.

== History ==
The tribe unanimously voted on their constitution on November 22, 1975, and ratified it on January 20, 1976.

== Name ==
The name Utuʼutuwi·tu, a subgroup of Owens Valley Paiute (or Eastern Mono), was Anglicized to Utu Utu Gwaiti, or Gwaitu.

== Education ==
The reservation is served by the Eastern Sierra Unified School District.

== General and cited references ==
- Liljeblad, Sven and Fowler, Catherine S. "Owens Valley Paiute." Handbook of North American Indians: Great Basin, Volume 11. Washington, DC: Smithsonian Institution, 1986. ISBN 978-0-16-004581-3.
- Pritzker, Barry M. A Native American Encyclopedia: History, Culture, and Peoples. Oxford: Oxford University Press, 2000. ISBN 978-0-19-513877-1.
- Rusco, Elmer R. and Mary K. Rusco. "Tribal Politics." Handbook of North American Indians: Great Basin, Volume 11. Washington, DC: Smithsonian Institution, 1986. ISBN 978-0-16-004581-3.
