= Cedarville Rancheria =

Indian tribe in California, United States

Coordinates: 41°31′36″N 120°10′59″W

pasɨɨbi (Northern Paiute)

Total population
- 35 enrolled members, 26 rancheria population (2011)

Regions with significant populations
- United States (California)

Languages
- English, Northern Paiute

Related ethnic groups
- other Northern Paiute people

The Cedarville Rancheria (Northern Paiute: pasɨɨbi) is a federally recognized tribe of Northern Paiute people in Modoc County, California, about 30 miles (48 km) south of the Oregon border. Cedarville Rancheria is 26 acres in Cedarville. The tribal headquarters is located 20 miles away from the Rancheria in Alturas. The tribe has an environmental protection agency that is dedicated to keeping the Rancheria clean and teaching children how to protect and care for the planet.

== Government ==
The tribe is governed by a community council, which comprises all members over the age of 18. Everyone's voice counts. Melissa Davis, chairwoman, Richard Lash, Vice Chairman, and Brandi Pratt, Secretary, are the elected representatives for the Tribe.

== Reservation ==
Location of Cedarville Rancheria

The Cedarville Rancheria is a federally recognized ranchería with an area of 20 acres. Founded in 1914, it had six residents on 17 acres in 1990. The 2010 census recorded 13 inhabitants. It is located within the unincorporated community of Cedarville. All tribal citizens can trace their lineage back to the official census roll dated 18 July 1954. Their first attempt at running a business came to their purchase of what is now the Cedarville Rancheria Public Scales. They also run a mini mart/ truck stop off the highway near the scales.

Map of Cedarville Rancheria and nearby reservations (In yellow.)

== History ==
Cedarville Rancheria is a branch of the Northern Paiute. Pre-contact they were adapted to the desert environment that surrounded them and gathering for food was a group effort when it came to hunting and gathering. After contact with Europeans they suffered from infectious deceases such as smallpox and had some of the greatest losses from it.

=== 2014 tribal office shooting ===
On February 20, 2014, 44-year-old Cherie Lash Rhoades, the former tribal chairperson (who had been recently ousted and was under federal investigation over at least $50,000 in missing funds), opened fire in the tribe's Alturas office during a tribal eviction meeting.

She killed four people and wounded two others using a 9mm semi-automatic handgun. When she ran out of ammunition, she grabbed a butcher knife from the office kitchen and stabbed one person who was already injured by gunshots. She later ran outside, knife in her hand, where she was arrested. Rhoades was attending an eviction hearing at the office (against her and her son) when she began her attack.

Police arrested Rhoades after she ran outside and took her into custody. Those killed included the suspect's brother, 50-year-old Rurik Davis; her niece, 19-year-old Angel Penn; and her nephew, 30-year-old Glenn Calonicco. The fourth person killed was 47-year-old Sheila Lynn Russo, the tribal administrator and a mother of two. Rhoades was ultimately sentenced to death for these murders in April 2017. Her case is notable due to her being a rare example of a female mass shooter.

== Education ==
The rancheria is served by the Surprise Valley Joint Unified School District.

== See also ==
- Indigenous peoples of California
