= Jackson Rancheria =

Coordinates: 38°23′06″N 120°43′24″W

- Indian reservation
- Location of Jackson Rancheria
- Tribe: Miwok
- Country: United States
- State: California
- County: Amador

Jackson Rancheria is the landbase for the Jackson Band of Miwuk Indians, a federally recognized tribe of Miwok people, located near Jackson, California. It is located in Amador County, about midway between Jackson and Pine Grove. The reservation operates the Jackson Rancheria Casino Resort, located on its territory.

== Education ==
The ranchería is served by the Amador County Unified School District.
