= Sherwood Valley Rancheria of Pomo Indians of California =

Coordinates: 39°32′13″N 123°29′18″W

shibaldano pʰoʔmaʔ (Northern Pomo)

Total population
- 350

Regions with significant populations
- United States (California)

Languages
- English, Pomoan languages

Religion
- Traditional Tribal religion, Christianity, Kuksu

Related ethnic groups
- Pomo tribes

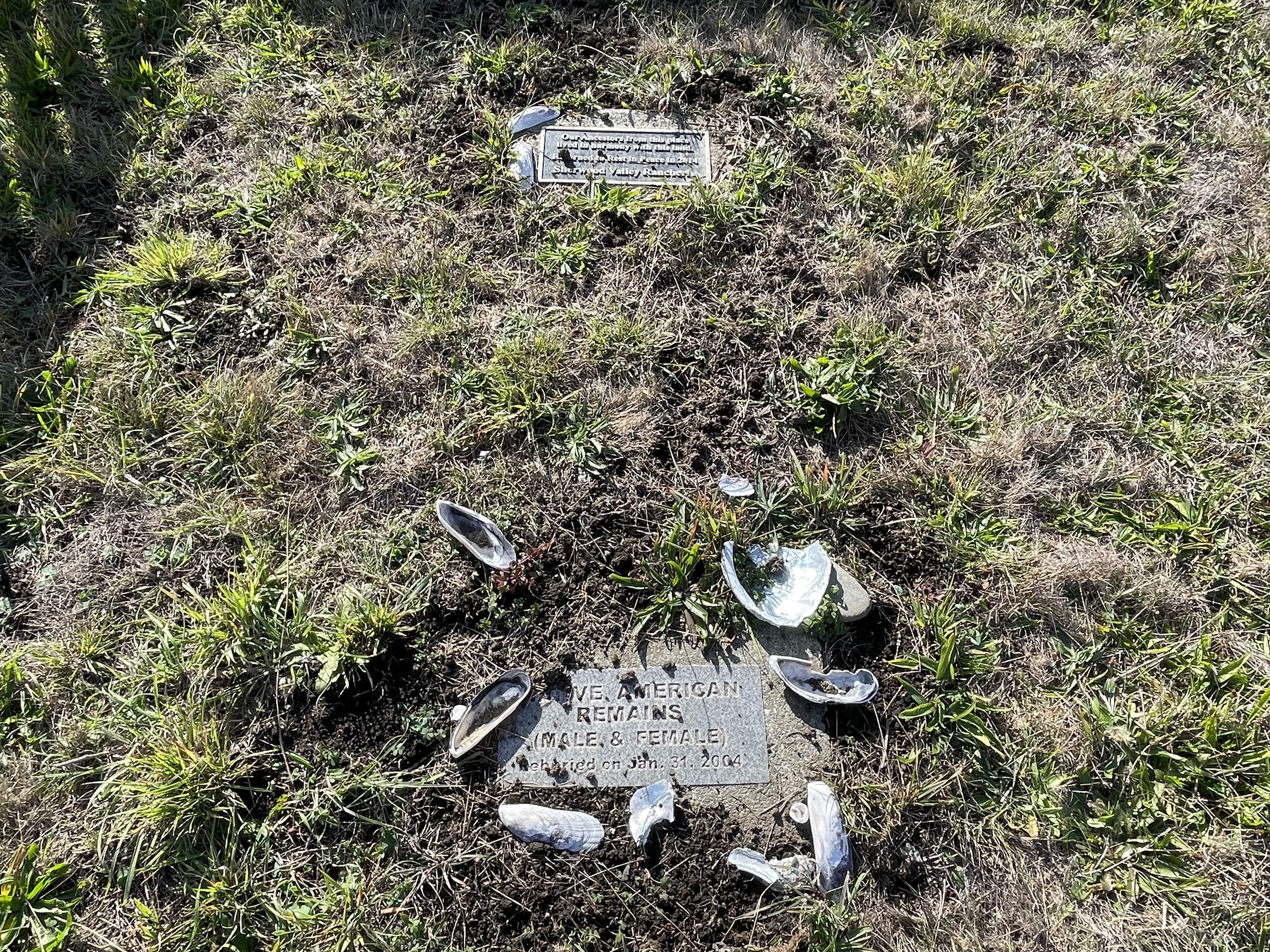
Grave of a Pomo man and woman, reinterred at the Westport Cemetery, by the Sherwood Valley Band of Pomo Indians in Westport, California.

The Sherwood Valley Rancheria of Pomo Indians of California (Northern Pomo: shibaldano pʰoʔmaʔ) is a federally recognized tribe of Pomo Indians in California.

The tribe's reservation, the Sherwood Valley Rancheria (shibaldano), is located in Mendocino County, near Willits, California, on Highway 101. It is 356 acres (1.44 km^{2}) large. The lands on the reservation are called the old and new rancheria.

== History ==
Sherwood Valley Rancheria is a community of Coastal Pomo Indians, who are indigenous to Sonoma and Mendocino Counties in northern California. Their historical community was called Kulá Kai Pomo, and they traditionally lived along the upper course of the Eel River. They spoke the Pomo language. The last traditional chief of the Kulá Kai Pomo was Lunkaya.

Companies of explorers in nineteenth century Russian expeditions were the first non-Indians with whom the Pomo made contact. Russian outposts were established in the 1800s, including Fort Ross in Sonoma County. When the Russians withdrew, their presence was replaced by increasing numbers of European-Americans that came to aboriginal Pomo lands to mine gold in the mid-nineteenth century California Gold Rush. Pomo tribes in California were forcefully removed from their historic lands for miner settlement and profit. Pomo Indians were removed to small reservations, or rancherias, that were established by the US government for displaced Californian tribes, including the Sherwood Valley Rancheria.

== Description ==
Sherwood Valley Rancheria of Pomo Indians has over 450 enrolled members with 179 members residing on reservation land. The tribe owns Sherwood Valley Rancheria Casino and Creekside Cafe, formerly known as the Black Bart Casino, in Willits on land purchased by the tribe in 1987.

They are a member of the InterTribal Sinkyone Wilderness Council which is a consortium of Northern California tribal nations focused on environmental and cultural preservation. The council, which includes members of 10 federally recognized tribes in Mendocino and Lake counties, has worked to protect lands of cultural importance along the North Coast within the traditional Sinkyone tribal territory since it was established in 1986.

== See also ==
- Pomo people
