= Koi Nation =

Koi Nation of Northern California Lower Lake Rancheria
Xqoy (Southeastern Pomo)

Regions with significant populations
- United States (California)

Languages
- English, traditionally Southeastern Pomo

Related ethnic groups
- other Pomo peoples

The Koi Nation of the Lower Lake Rancheria is a federally recognized tribe of Southeastern Pomo people in northern California. Their name for their tribe is Koi Nation of Northern California, from their traditional village, Koi (Xqoy), once located on an island in Clear Lake.

Koi, meaning people of water, lived on islands in the Clear Lake in what is now Lake County, and migrated seasonally to the California coast. The "Purvis Tract" is located on the Northwest corner of the Clear Lake. For thousands of years, the Nation lived under the Purvis Tract. In that time, the nation continued to assert its unique identity and maintain control of its area.

== History ==
The Koi people were among the Southeastern Pomo who lived in north-central California for millennia. They fished, hunted, and gathered.

=== Post-contact ===
In the 19th century, European-Americans occupied Pomo lands in large numbers. The US government signed two treaties with Pomos in 1851–1852 which defined Pomo territory; however, these treaties were never ratified by Congress. In 1856, the US government forcibly removed many Pomo people to a reservation in Mendocino County; however, the Koi remained on their island.

In 1870, Koi people attended a historic Ghost Dance. By 1871, their homes had been burned and destroyed by European-Americans. Disease, enslavement, and murder greatly reduced their population.

By the beginning of the 1900s, tribal members were primarily living around Santa Rosa, Windsor, and Sebastopol. As of 2021, the Koi Nation has 90 members, most of whom live in Sonoma County.

=== Tribal recognition ===
The Koi became a recognized tribe in 1916, the year the federal government bought 140 acres (57 ha), known as Purvis Flats, near the town of Clearlake in Lake County, and designated it as the Lower Lake Rancheria. An official of the Bureau of Indian Affairs described it as "a rock pile," and it remained uninhabited until a handful of Indians took up residence there in the 1940s.

Records on file at the National Archives regional center in San Bruno show that in 1953, when Lake County expressed interest in acquiring the land for an airport, the only two Indians living on Purvis Flats were a couple, Harry Johnson and his wife, Isabella. A special Act of Congress in 1956 gave 99 acres (40 ha) to the county for the airport, and the remaining 41 acres (17 ha), occupied by the Johnsons, became their private property, a "gift" from the government.

The tribe was terminated on March 28, 1956 by two laws, Public Law 443 [H. R. 585] 70 Stat. 58 and Public Law 751 [H. R. 11163] 70 Stat. 595. Indian Health program records similarly show termination as of that date, with no tribal members eligible for services. The termination was part of the Indian termination policy of the mid-1940s to mid-1960s, and specifically part of a set of Congressional acts that targeted 51 Rancherias in California.

The tribal position was that though they were landless, they had not been officially terminated. After years of attempting to have their status reaffirmed, the Bureau of Indian Affairs, "citing oversights in official records", again recognized the tribe on December 29, 2000. At the time, the tribe consisted of 53 members, mostly children.

In California, tribes with gaming operations pay into a fund which distributes payments to federally recognized tribes which operate fewer than 350 gaming devices. Payments started in 2001, and through June 30, 2021, the Koi Nation had received $21.39 million.

In July 2023, the Koi Nation sued the city of Clearlake, seeking to delay the city's development of a sports complex on 25 acres (10 ha) of land. The tribe argued that a full CEQA environmental review was required, instead of a mitigated negative declaration by the city.

== Government ==
In 1994, a new tribal government apparently was formed to make a claim for Pearce Field, a small airport which Lake County closed that year. In June 2008, a new Constitution was ratified, replacing the Articles of Association.

The tribe is governed by a democratically elected five-person community council.

== Gaming ==
=== Determinations ===
In March 2008, the tribe submitted a gaming ordinance for the National Indian Gaming Commission (NICG) Chairman's review and approval. The Indian Gaming Regulatory Act (IGRA), 25 U.S.C. 2710(b), requires the NIGC Chairman to review and approve (or disapprove) tribal gaming ordinances. The ordinance sought a determination from the Chairman that the Nation was a restored tribe within the meaning of 25 U.S.C. 2719(b)(1)(B)(iii). On June 18, 2008, the Chairman disapproved the ordinance. He deferred to a December 29, 2000, determination of the Assistant Secretary for Indian Affairs, which reaffirmed the government-to-government relationship between the Nation and the United States and found that the Nation had never been terminated. Moreover, he said that determinations about the government-to-government relationships between the United States and Indian tribes are made by the Secretary of the Interior and the Bureau of Indian Affairs.

In 2006, 2009, and 2014, the tribe requested from the Department of the Interior (DOI) a determination that the tribe qualified to conduct gaming on lands taken into trust, as part of “the restoration of lands for an Indian tribe that is restored to Federal recognition.” [25 U.S.C. § 2719(b)(1)(B)(iii)]. On January 19, 2017, DOI denied the tribe's eligibility for the IGRA exception. In January 2019, the U.S. District Court for the District of Columbia ruled that the tribe was in fact eligible.

=== Proposed sites ===
==== Oakland ====
In 2005, the tribe officially announced its plans to build a world-class tribal government gaming facility, resort and spa near the Oakland International Airport. The Tribe's Crystal Bay Casino, Resort & Spa project was said to create an estimated 4,440 new jobs, 2,200 directly, annual payroll approaching $80 million and $1 billion in overall annual economic activity for the local area. The Tribe also began talks with the city to explore potential benefits the project could bring to the local economy. Discussions included a proposal for annual payments from the Tribe to mitigate impacts to city services, including funding for additional police and fire protection, reimbursement for lost property taxes and parking tax revenue, and road and traffic improvements. The proposal was funded by Florida real estate developer Alan Ginsburg. Facing community opposition, the tribe dropped its plans.

==== Vallejo ====
In late 2014, the tribe was one of eight applicants for the development of a site in Vallejo, California, which had been part of the Mare Island Naval Shipyard; four applications involved Indian gambling. The tribe partnered with developer Cordish Company for a proposed $850 million project, promising to pay the city between $10 million and $20 million a year, along with generating thousands of jobs. In January 2015 the Vallejo City Council voted to reject all gambling proposals and to concentrate solely on industrial proposals for the site.

==== Sonoma County ====
In September 2021, the tribe announced that it had purchased a 68-acre vineyard (28 ha) site on unincorporated county land on the southeast border of Windsor, California, north of Santa Rosa, for $12.3 million, and planned to turn it into a $600 million casino resort. Koi Nation attorneys filed an application to place the land into trust with the federal government, to make it eligible for casino construction under the Indian Gaming Regulatory Act. The development would be about 1.2 million square feet and have about 2,000 employees when completed, according to a spokesman for the tribe. The tribe has declined to provide the names of any investors in the project.

In January 2022, the tribe announced a pre-development agreement with the Chickasaw Nation, a much larger tribe that owns 23 casinos in Oklahoma. The agreement calls for Global Gaming Solutions, a wholly owned Chickasaw business, to manage and operate the proposed facility. In February 2022, the tribe announced an agreement with the Northern California Carpenters Union, for the site, which is planned to have 2,500 gaming machines, a 400-room hotel, six restaurant and food service areas, a meeting center and spa, and a live entertainment venue.

In 2022, the Bureau of Indian Affairs (BIA) began preparation of an Environmental Assessment (EA) to analyze the potential environmental consequences of the proposed fee-to-trust transfer of the Sonoma County property, including a comment period in mid-2022. The EA was issued in late 2023; in March 2024, the BIA decided that an environmental impact statement (EIS), a more comprehensive assessment, was required.

In addition to the EIS, a determination is needed as to whether the project meets the requirements of the Indian Gaming Regulatory Act. The final major regulatory step would be for the tribe to negotiate a gaming compact with the state of California.

== See also ==
- Indigenous peoples of California
