= Guidiville Rancheria of California =

Coordinates: 39°9′58″N 123°10′9″W

Guidiville Rancheria
- Indian reservation
- Location of the Guidiville Rancheria
- Tribe: Pomo
- Country: United States
- State: California
- County: Mendocino

Location in Mendocino County

The Guidiville Rancheria of California are a federally recognized Pomo tribe located in Mendocino County, California.

== History ==
During the California Gold Rush, an influx of non-Indian settlers drove the Guidiville Pomos from their ancestral lands near Lake County, California into Mendocino County. The US government sent commissioners to negotiate treaties with the tribe in 1851. Although the Guidiville Band, among other Pomo bands, ceded their ancestral lands, the US congress did not ratify the treaties and the Guidiville never received their promised treaty lands. These treaties were locked away in Washington DC and not rediscovered until the 20th century. In the meantime, the Guidiville Band was left landless.

Between the years of 1909 and 1915, the federal government purchased small parcels of land for homeless California Indians, called rancherias. The Guidiville Rancheria did not have the water or infrastructure for subsistence. Disease and harsh conditions resulted in early death for members of the band. Those that could traveled to the Bay Area for work. Other tribal members picked hops or fruit as migrant farm workers.

During the Indian termination policy, the federal government unilaterally terminated the status of the Guidiville Rancheria in 1958. Their trust lands were sold to private owners. In 1987, the tribe successfully sued the US government for wrongful termination. In 1991, the combined Scotts Valley-Guidiville federal lawsuit was settled, paving the way for the tribe to reorganize.

== The tribe today ==
The tribe received federal recognition in 1992. They have obtained a 44-acre (180,000 m^{2}) parcel of land, located two miles (3 km) to the east of Ukiah, California.

Today the tribe is headquartered in Talmage, California. The tribe is governed by an elected council, headed by a chairperson. Merlene Sanchez is currently serving as Tribal Chairperson.
