= Mesa Grande Band of Diegueno Mission Indians =

Native Iipay Indians in Southern California

Mesa Grande Band of Diegueño Mission Indians
Total population
- 630 enrolled members

Regions with significant populations
- United States (California)

Languages
- Ipai, English

Religion
- Traditional tribal religion, Christianity (Roman Catholicism)

Related ethnic groups
- other Paipai, and Taipai

The Mesa Grande Band of Diegueño Mission Indians of the Mesa Grande Reservation is a federally recognized tribe of Iipay people.

== Reservation ==
Location of Mesa Grande Reservation

The Mesa Grande Reservation (Kumiai: Tekemak or Matetuu Emak; 33°05′19″N 116°45′07″W) is a federal Indian reservation located in eastern San Diego County, California, near Santa Ysabel. Founded in 1875, the reservation is 1,803 acres (7.30 km^{2}) large. Approximately 180 of the 630 members of the tribe live on the reservation. In 1973, 24 out of 261 enrolled tribal members lived on the reservation.

The reservation was featured in the 1936 film Ramona.

=== Demographics ===
Mesa Grande Reservation, California – Racial and ethnic composition Note: the US Census treats Hispanic/Latino as an ethnic category. This table excludes Latinos from the racial categories and assigns them to a separate category. Hispanics/Latinos may be of any race.
Race / Ethnicity (NH = Non-Hispanic)	Pop 2000	Pop 2010	Pop 2020	% 2000	% 2010	% 2020
White alone (NH)	6	6	7	8.00%	6.12%	8.05%
Black or African American alone (NH)	0	0	0	0.00%	0.00%	0.00%
Native American or Alaska Native alone (NH)	42	90	55	56.00%	91.84%	63.22%
Asian alone (NH)	0	0	0	0.00%	0.00%	0.00%
Native Hawaiian or Pacific Islander alone (NH)	0	0	0	0.00%	0.00%	0.00%
Other race alone (NH)	0	0	0	0.00%	0.00%	0.00%
Mixed race or Multiracial (NH)	4	1	4	5.33%	1.02%	4.60%
Hispanic or Latino (any race)	23	1	21	30.67%	1.02%	24.14%
Total	75	98	87	100.00%	100.00%	100.00%

== Government ==
The Mesa Grande Band is headquartered in Mesa Grande, CA. They are governed by a democratically elected tribal council. Michael Linton is their current tribal chairperson.
