= Enterprise Rancheria =

Estom Yumeka Maidu landbase in Butte County, California, U.S.

Coordinates: 39.561638°N 121.35548°W

Location of Enterprise Rancheria

Enterprise Rancheria is the landbase for the Estom Yumeka Maidu Tribe, located in Butte County, near Oroville, California. The nearest outside communities are Berry Creek and Forbestown. As of the 2020 Census the population was 4, up from 1 in 2010. The Estom Yumeka Maidu Tribe itself has around 1000 citizens.
