= Quartz Valley Indian Community =

Coordinates: 41°36′41″N 122°58′21″W

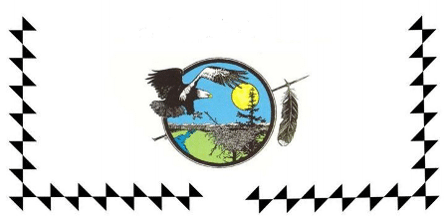

Total population
- 150 enrolled members

Regions with significant populations
- United States (California)

Languages
- English, Karuk, formerly Klamath and Shasta

Religion
- traditional tribal religion

Related ethnic groups
- other Klamath, Karuk, and Shasta peoples

The Quartz Valley Indian Community of the Quartz Valley Reservation of California is a federally recognized tribe of Klamath, Karuk, and Shasta Indians in Siskiyou County, California.

== Reservation ==
Location of Quartz Valley Reservation

The Quartz Valley Reservation was originally located near the current reservation but was terminated by the US government in the 1960s. The current reservation is 174 acres (0.70 km^{2}) large, and the tribe is working to acquire additional lands. In 2026, the tribe was approved for a loan.

Nearby communities are Greenview, Fort Jones, and Etna, California.

Map of Quartz Valley Reservation and nearby reservations (In cyan.)

== Education ==
For elementary education, part of the reservation is served by the Quartz Valley Elementary School District and the other portion by the Etna Union Elementary School District. For secondary education, the entire reservation is served by the Etna Union High School District.
