= Santa Rosa Band of Cahuilla Indians =

Native Cahuilla Indians in Southern California

Coordinates: 33°33′23″N 116°31′45″W

Total population
- 156

Regions with significant populations
- United States (California)

Languages
- English, Cahuilla language

Religion
- traditional tribal religion, Christianity (Roman Catholicism and Protestantism)

Related ethnic groups
- Cahuilla tribes

The Santa Rosa Band of Cahuilla Indians is a federally recognized tribe of Cahuilla Indians, located in Riverside County, California.

== Reservation ==
Location of Santa Rosa Indian Reservation

The Santa Rosa Indian Reservation, not to be confused with the Santa Rosa Rancheria, is a reservation in Riverside County in the Santa Rosa Mountains, near the town of Anza. It is 11,092 acres (44.89 km^{2}) acres large. It was established in 1907.

== Government ==
The tribe's headquarters is located on the Santa Rosa Indian Reservation. Steven Estrada is their current tribal chairperson.

== History ==
The federal government closely supervised Cahuilla after 1891. Government schools were opened for Cahuilla children and Protestant missionaries moved onto their reservation. During the 20th century, the tribe supported itself through cattle grazing and wage labor. Many members of the Santa Rosa band do not live on the reservation. In 1970, only 7 out of 61 enrolled tribal members lived on the reservation. Education and economic diversity has improved for the tribes since the 1970s.

== See also ==
- Mission Indians
