= Southeast Alaska Regional Health Consortium =

Non-profit health consortium in Alaska, US

Southeast Alaska Regional Health Consortium (SEARHC) is a non-profit medical, dental, vision and mental health organization serving the health interests of the residents of Southeast Alaska.

== Organizational structure ==
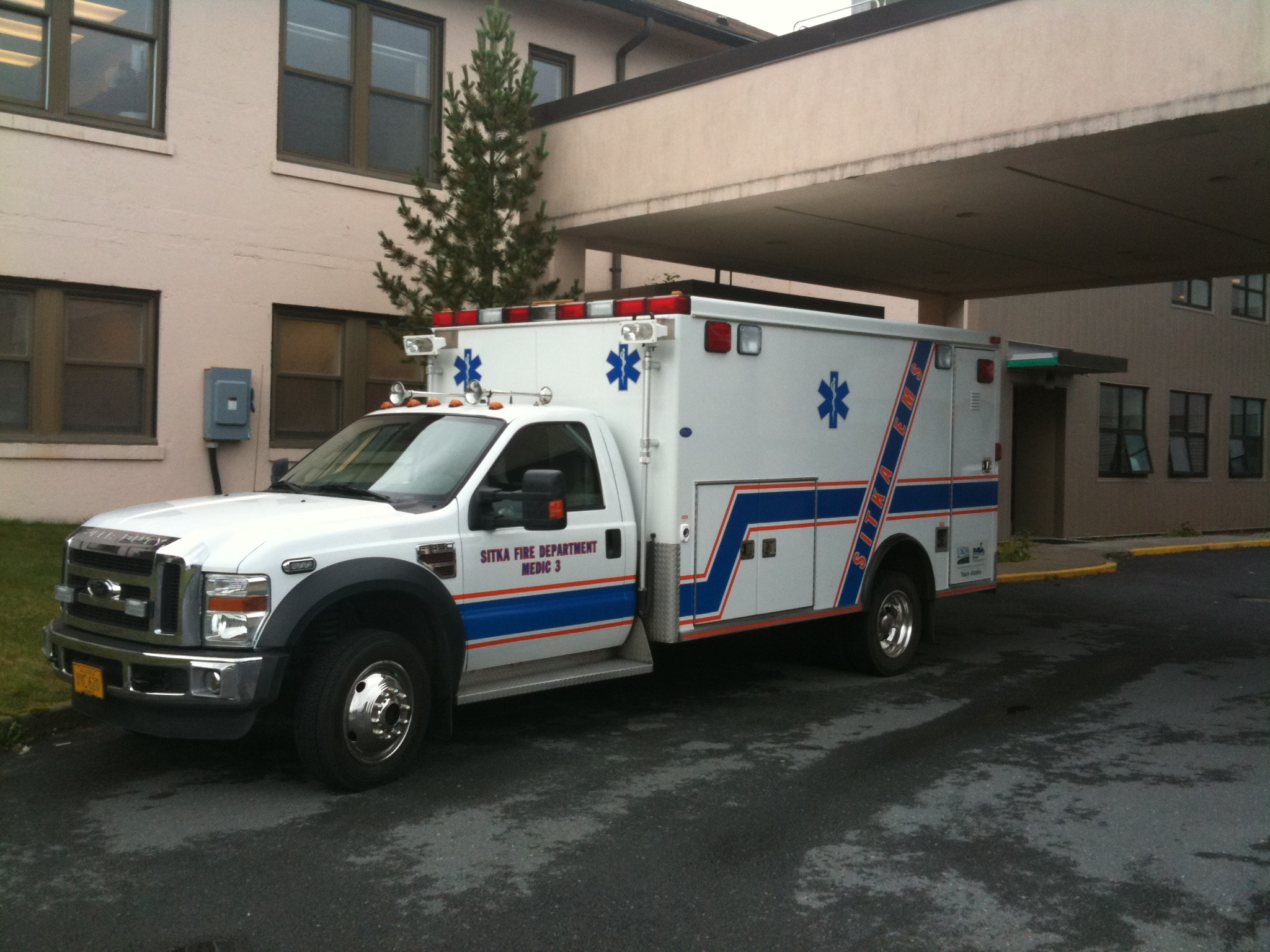
Mt. Edgecumbe Medical Center ER

As a non-profit tribal health consortium of 18 Native communities, SEARHC serves the health interests of the Tlingit, Haida, Tsimshian people, other Alaska Native people, and other residents of Southeast Alaska. It is one of the oldest and largest Native-run health organizations in the United States.

Each of the eighteen-member board of directors is elected by and represents one of the village tribal organizations. The board supervises the chief executive officer of the consortium. The board typically alternates bi-monthly meetings between Juneau and Sitka, but will occasionally convene in a smaller village.

SEARHC is funded by the Bureau of Indian Affairs, various grant sources, and through 3rd party billing. Services are available to eligible Alaska Native and American Indians; eligibility is typically based upon Certificate of Degree of Indian Blood or other legal documentation. Services financed by the entities, such as Health Resources and Services Administration or United States Department of Veterans Affairs, may provided for all residents of the region.

As of 2012 SEARHC employs approximately 1000 employees throughout Southeast Alaska, and maintains 18 staffed facilities which includes the Joint Commission-accredited Mt. Edgecumbe Medical Center in Sitka, Alaska

SEARHC also is a co-signer and member of the Alaska Native Tribal Health Consortium which provides statewide interconnections between the regional health organizations, for example the Alaska Federal Health Care Access Network.

== Medical facilities and service ==
In Southeast Alaska, Southeast Alaska Regional Health Consortium runs healthcare facilities across 27 communities as of 2022, including hospitals in Sitka and Wrangell; although it originally served Native Americans only, it has expanded access and combined with other local facilities over time.

== History ==
About a decade after the Alaska Statehood Act in 1959 there were two significant Federal acts that impacted Alaska Natives.

The first was the Alaska Native Claims Settlement Act (ANCSA) of December 1971, which set up 13 regional for-profit Alaska Native Regional Corporations for Alaska Natives – 12 in the state and one based in the Lower 48 for Alaska Natives living in the continental United States.

The next was the Indian Self-Determination and Education Assistance Act of 1975. This allowed Tribal organizations to form contracts with the Bureau of Indian Affairs and to transfer the responsibility for management and delivery of services such as housing, lands management, tribal government assistance, education and employment and natural resources programs. Also included in this was the delivery of health care services, previously supplied from the Indian Health Service (IHS).

SEARHC's contracting with IHS began in 1976 when it took over management of the Community Health Aides Program. In 1982, SEARHC took over operation of the IHS Juneau clinic and in 1986 it took over operation of Mt. Edgecumbe Hospital in Sitka. Following the creation of these anchor facilities, SEARHC began building and staffing regional outpatient facilities in most of the smaller villages it represented.

In 2004, SEARHC developed the Frontier Extended Stay Clinic (FESC) program that allows five primary care clinics in remote Alaska and Washington to provide around-the-clock care for seriously injured or ill patients, and patients who require monitoring before returning home. By covering longer patient stays, the program has saved $14 million in medical evacuations and improved the quality of care for patients.

In 2006 a biography of the organization was written and entitled Gumboot Determination: The Story of the Southeast Alaska Regional Health Consortium, which won a recognition in the American Book Awards.

== Member communities ==
- Angoon, Alaska – Angoon Community Association
- Craig, Alaska – Craig Community Association
- Douglas, Alaska – Douglas Indian Association
- Haines, Alaska – Chilkoot Indian Association
- Hoonah, Alaska – Hoonah Indian Association
- Hydaburg, Alaska – Hydaburg Cooperative Association
- Juneau, Alaska – Tlingit and Haida Indians of the City & Borough of Juneau
- Kake, Alaska – Organized Village of Kake
- Kasaan, Alaska – Organized Village of Kasaan
- Klawock, Alaska – Klawock Cooperative Association
- Klukwan, Alaska – Chilkat Indian Village
- Pelican, Alaska – Pelican Tlingit and Haida Community Council
- Petersburg, Alaska – Petersburg Indian Association
- Sitka, Alaska – Sitka Tribe of Alaska
- Skagway, Alaska – Skagway Traditional Council
- Tenakee, Alaska – Tenakee Springs Indian Community
- Wrangell, Alaska – Wrangell Cooperative Association
- Yakutat, Alaska – Yakutat Tlingít Tribe
