= Koniag, Incorporated =

Alaska Native Regional Corporation

Koniag is one of 13 Alaska Native regional Corporations. These were created under the Alaska Native Claims Settlement Act of 1971 (ANCSA) in settlement of aboriginal land claims. Koniag was incorporated in Alaska on June 23, 1972. Headquartered in Kodiak, Alaska, with additional offices in Anchorage, Koniag is a for-profit corporation with about 4,300 Alaska Native shareholders primarily of Alutiiq descent.

== Officers and directors ==
A current listing of Koniag's officers and directors, as well as documents filed with the State of Alaska since Koniag's incorporation, are available online through the Corporations Database of the Division of Corporations, Business & Professional Licensing, Alaska Department of Commerce, Community and Economic Development.

== Shareholders ==
At incorporation, Koniag enrolled about 3,400 Alaska Native shareholders, each of whom received 100 shares of Koniag stock. As an ANCSA corporation, Koniag has no publicly traded stock and its shares cannot legally be sold.

== Lands ==
The Koniag region comprises Kodiak Island and the Kodiak Archipelago and a small portion of the southern coast of the Alaska Peninsula. Koniag's original land entitlement under ANCSA was 895 acres (3.6 km^{2}), plus the subsurface estate of lands allocated to village corporations in the Koniag region. Complications of the land selection process, especially the lack of available land given the region's long history of non-Native settlement, led to land exchanges through which Koniag was permitted to select subsurface rights in lands along the coast of the Alaska Peninsula across Shelikof Strait from Kodiak Island. Later, some of the Alaska Peninsula lands were exchanged for land on Afognak Island.

== Business enterprises ==
Under federal law, Koniag and its majority-owned subsidiaries, joint ventures and partnerships are deemed to be "minority and economically disadvantaged business enterprise[s]" (43 USC 1626(e)).

== Koniag region tribes ==
The tribes who work with Koniag, Incorporated, and are in their region include:

- Alutiiq Tribe of Old Harbor
- Kaguyak Village
- Native Village of Afognak
- Native Village of Akhiok
- Native Village of Karluk
- Native Village of Larsen Bay
- Native Village of Ouzinkie
- Native Village of Port Lions
- Sun'aq Tribe of Kodiak
- Tangirnaq Native Village
