= Tangirnaq Native Village =

Federally recognized Alaska Native tribe

Tangirnaq Native Village Tangirnarmiut (Alutiiq)
- Alaska Native village
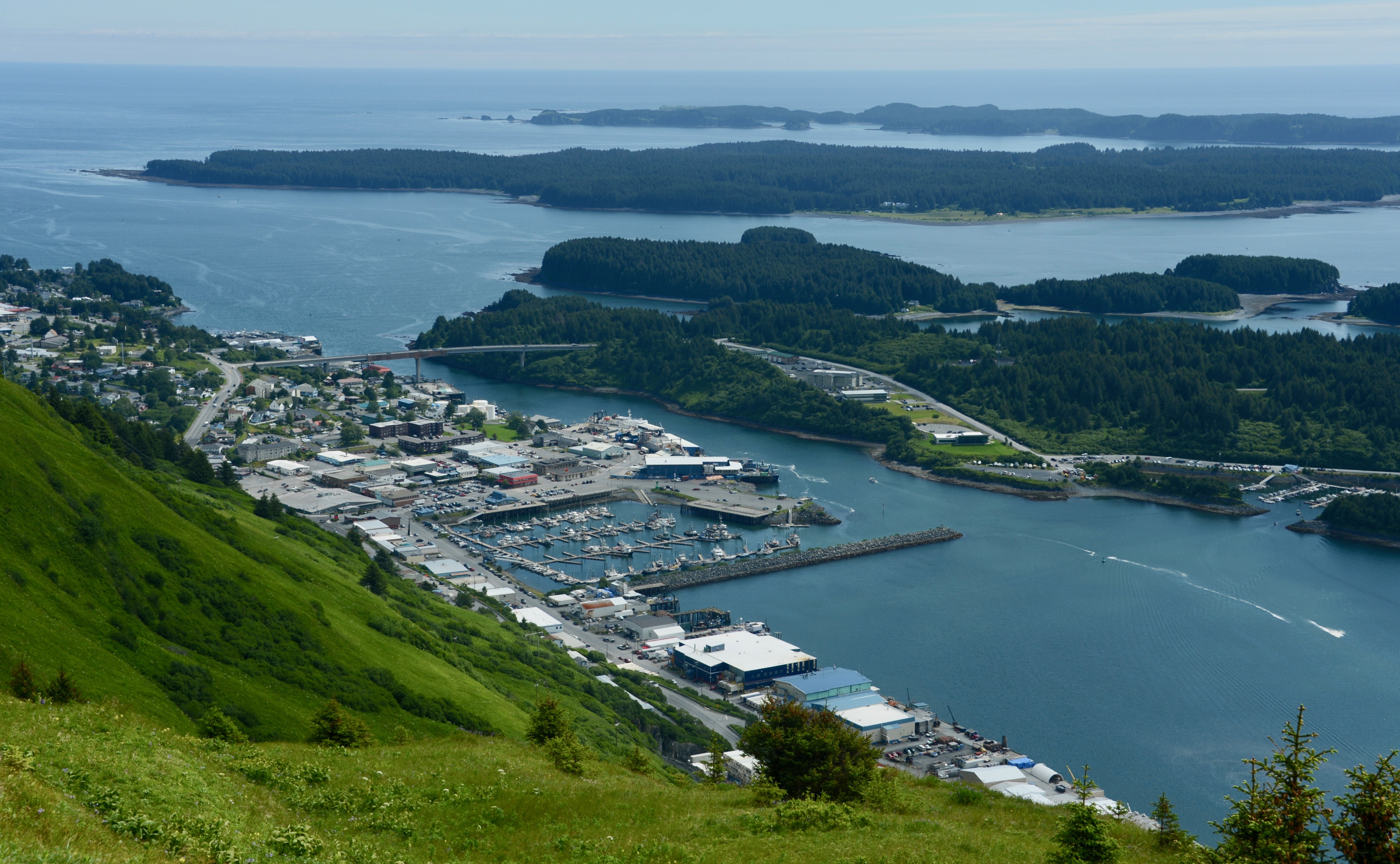
- Kodiak and Woody Island

- Location within Alaska
- Coordinates: 57°47′05″N 152°19′43″W
- Constitution Ratified: February 23, 2000; 26 years ago
- Capital: Kodiak, Alaska

Government
  - Type: Representative democracy
  - Body: Woody Island Tribal Council
  - President: Debbie Lukin

Population (2010)
  - Estimate: 250
- Demonym(s): Tangirnarmiut; Koniag Alutiiq
- Time zone: UTC–09:00 (AKST)
  - Summer (DST): UTC–08:00 (AKDT)
- Website: woodyisland.com

The Tangirnaq Native Village (Woody Island Tribal Council) is a federally recognized Alaska Native tribe of Koniag Alutiiq. This Alaska Native tribe is headquartered in Near Island, part of Kodiak, Alaska.

The tribe was previously known as Lesnoi Village. The people are called the Tangirnarmiut.

== Government ==
The Tangirnaq Native Village is led by a democratically elected tribal council. Its president is Debbie Lukin. The Alaska Regional Office of the Bureau of Indian Affairs serves the tribe. The tribe ratified its constitution in 2000.

The tribe is a member of the National Congress of American Indians.

== Territory ==
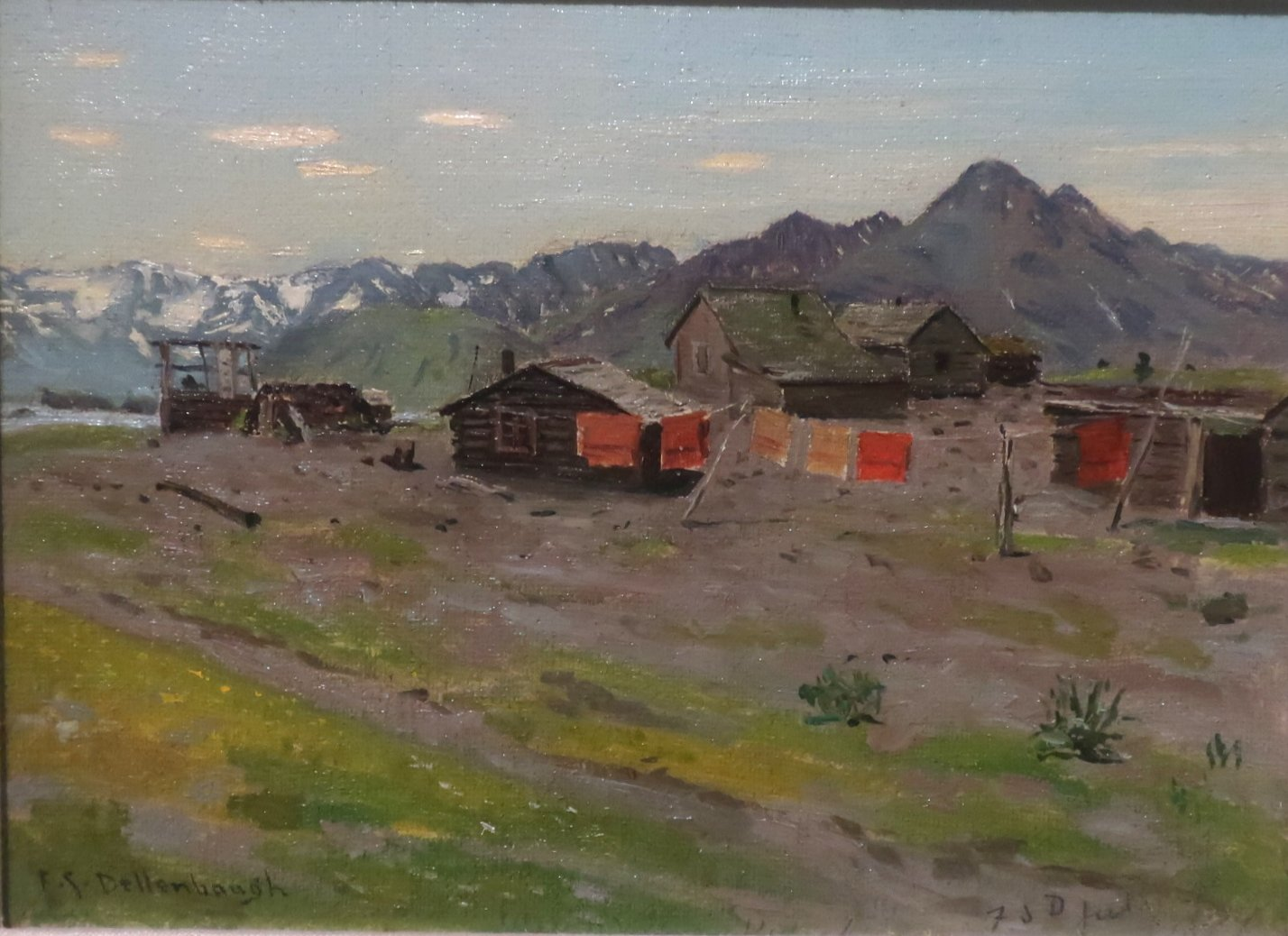
Painting of an Alutiiq village on Woody Island by Frederick Samuel Dellenbaugh, 1899

The Tangirnaq people have lived on Woody Island since time immemorial. When the Russians arrived in the late 18th century, they called it Ostrov Leisnoi. This small island is located two miles east of Kodiak. Now, tribe is also based in Near Island, which is part of Kodiak, Alaska. They are surrounded by the Kodiak Archipelago and the Gulf of Alaska.

The other tribes based in Kodiak, Alaska are the Native Village of Afognak and Sun'aq Tribe of Kodiak.

== Economy ==
The Tangirnaq Native Village is affiliated with Koniag, Incorporated, an Alaska Native corporation, and Leisnoi, Inc., an ANCSA Village Corporation. The tribe is working with the Kodiak Archipelago Leadership Institute to develop the Qik’rtaq Food Hub with hydroponic farms to provide food for the community.

== Language and media ==
The Tangirnaq Native Village speaks English and the Alutiiq language. The tribe publishes the Tangirnaq Times, a tribal newspaper.
