= Near Island (Alaska) =

Coordinates: 57°46′55″N 152°24′00″W

Near Island is an island that comprises part of the city of Kodiak, Alaska, United States. It lies across the Near Island Channel just south of downtown Kodiak. The island is the site of St. Herman Harbor, the newer of Kodiak's two marinas. Near island has a land area of 1.117 km^{2} (276.05 acres) and a resident population of six people as of the 2000 census. It is connected to downtown Kodiak by the Near Island Bridge on Dog Bay Road.

Other variations of its name have been: ostrov Blizkiy or Close Island (with which it was registered in 1814), Bliskie and Pogibshi. Near Island should not be confused with the Near Islands, the westernmost group of the Aleutian archipelago, in the Bering Sea.

The island is part of the territory of Tangirnaq Native Village, a federally recognized Alaska Native tribe of Chugach Sugpiaq.
