= Organized Village of Kasaan =

Alaska Native tribe

Organized Village of Kasaan Kasa'aan (Haida)
- Alaska Native village
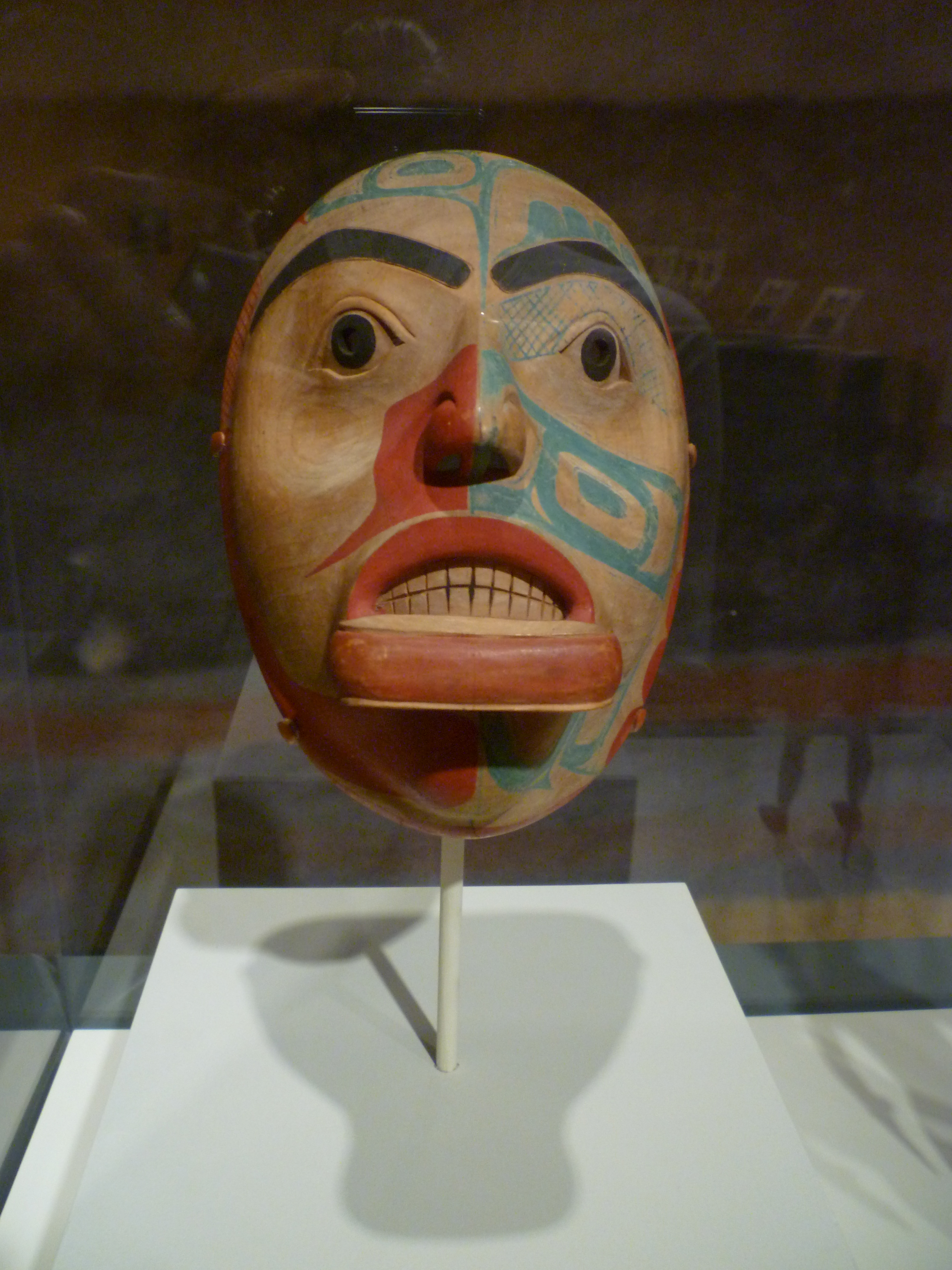
- Dzila'qons mask from the Village of Kasaan, Peabody Essex Museum

- Organized Village of Kasaan
- Coordinates: 55°32′12″N 132°23′47″W
- Constitution Ratified: October 15, 1938; 87 years ago
- Capital: Kasaan, Alaska

Government
  - Type: Representative democracy
  - Body: Kasaan Tribal Council
  - President: Michael Jones
- Demonym: Kaigani Haida
- Time zone: UTC–09:00 (AKST)
  - Summer (DST): UTC–08:00 (AKDT)
- Website: kasaan.org

The Organized Village of Kasaan is a federally recognized Alaska Native tribe of Haida people. This Alaska Native tribe is headquartered in Kasaan, Alaska Tlingit: Gasa'aan.

They are known as the Kaigani Haida. Kasaan Health Center provides healthcare to the tribe.

== Government ==
The Organized Village of Kasaan is led by a democratically elected tribal council. Its president is Michael Jones. The Alaska Regional Office of the Bureau of Indian Affairs serves the tribe. They ratified its constitution and corporate charter in 1938.

The tribe is a member of the National Congress of American Indians.

== Territory ==
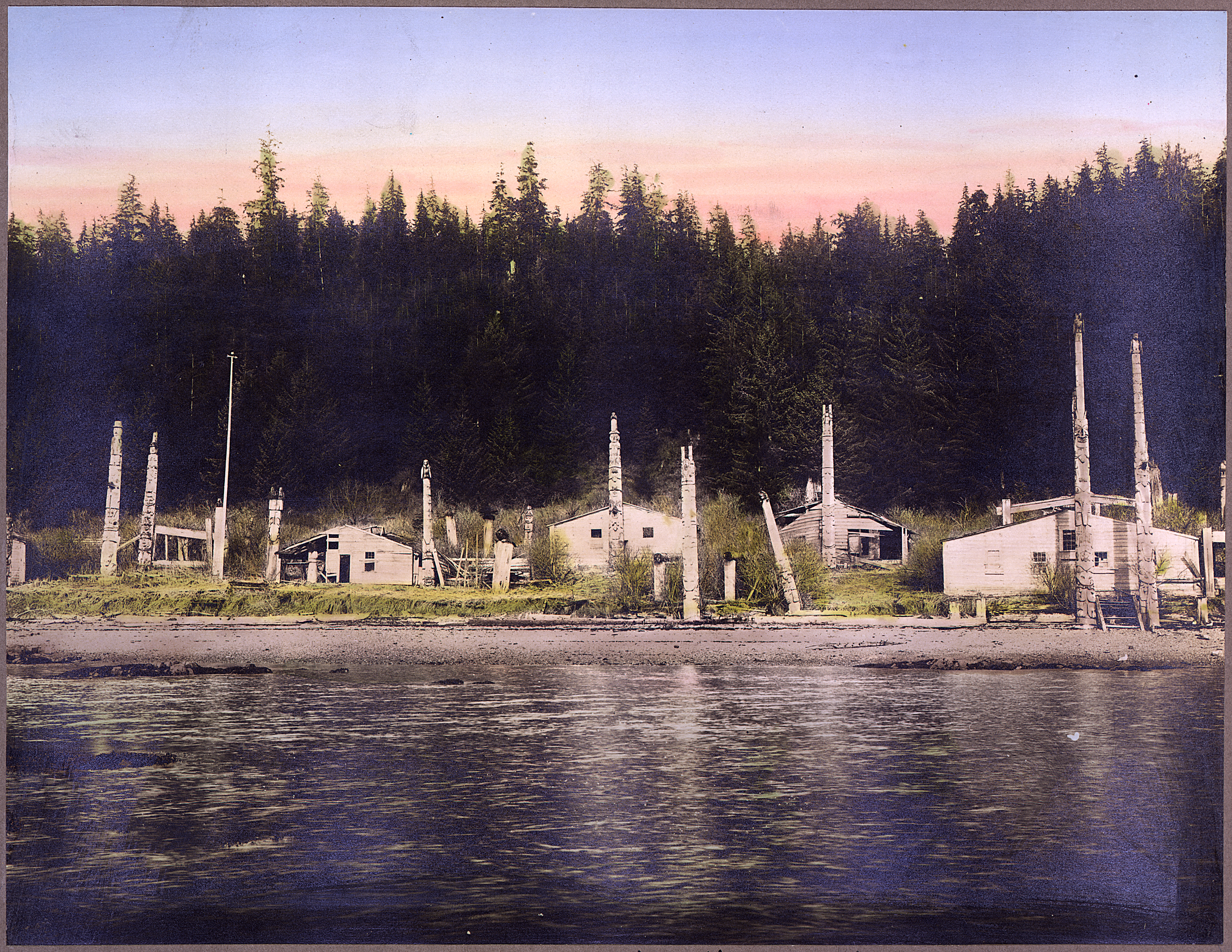
Vintage photograph of Old Kasaan Village with totem poles

Previously, the Kaigani Haida lived in a former village, Tlingit: Gasa'aan (meaning "pretty town) or "Old Kasaan". In the 18th century, they migrated to Kasaan, or "New Kasaan", which became the northernmost Haida settlement.

Kasaan is on the eastern coast of Prince of Wales Island that is part of the Alexander Archipelago. Kasaan is 30 miles northwest of Ketchikan, but not connected by highway, so travel off the island is airplane or boat.

Three other tribes are located on Prince of Wales Island: Craig Tribal Association, Hydaburg Cooperative Association, and Klawock Cooperative Association.

== Economy ==
Cultural tourism and timber are important to the tribe's livelihood. Alaska Dream Cruises lands at Kasaan. The Organized Village of Kasaan is affiliated with Sealaska Corporation, an Alaska Native corporation, and Kavilco Inc., an ANCSA Village Corporation.

== Language and culture ==
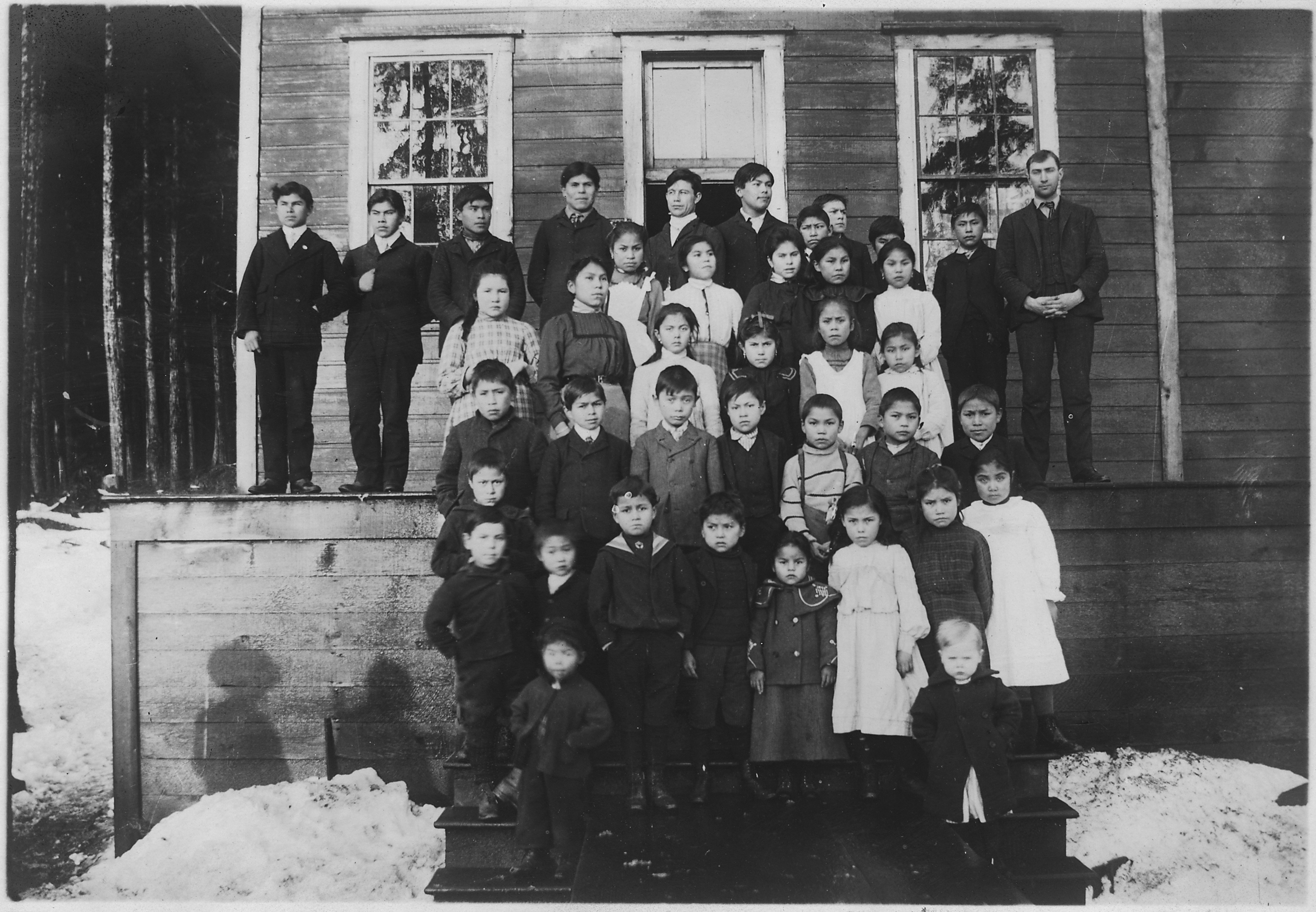
Schoolchildren at Kasaan, 1905. Photograph by Benjamin Haldane (Tsimshian, 1874–1941)

The Organized Village of Kasaan speaks English and the Haida language. The community has a Totem Park and the Chief Son-i-Hat Whale House (Haida: Náay I'waans), built in the late 19th century by Saanixaat, a Haida nobleman. The house has been restored and is open to visitors. The tide has a woodcarving workshop open to the public.

== See also ==
- Haida villages
