= Yakutat Tlingit Tribe =

Alaska Native village

- People: Tlingit
- Headquarters: Yakutat, Alaska, US

Government
- Chief: John Buller

Tribal Council
- Yakutat Tribal Council

Website
- https://yakutattlingittribe.org/

The Yakutat Tlingit Tribe is a federally recognized Tlingit Alaska Native tribal entity.

Other federally recognized Tlingit tribes include the Central Council of the Tlingit & Haida Indian Tribes, the Douglas Indian Association, Skagway Village, the Organized Village of Kake, the Sitka Tribe of Alaska, and the Wrangell Cooperative Association.

== About ==
The Yakutat Tlingit Tribe is headquartered in the borough of Yakutat. As of 2005, the tribe had 385 enrolled citizens. The word "Yakutat" comes from the Tlingit word "Yaakwdáat", which means "where canoes rest". The Yakutat Tlingit maintain aspects of traditional Tlingit culture with influences from the Eyak people.

== Culture ==
The Metropolitan Museum of Art in Manhattan displays some Yakutat Tlingit musical instruments, including a guitar and several lutes.

== History ==
The Yakutat Tlingit have historically occupied the southern portion of what is now the Wrangell–St. Elias National Park and Preserve near Icy Bay and Disenchantment Bay, the community of Yakutat, and the Malaspina Glacier and Forelands. The National Park Service has conducted ethnographic research detailing Yakutat Tlingit connections to Wrangell–St. Elias.

In the 21st century, the remains of eight Native American bodies have been repatriated to Kaguyak Village; six from the U.S. Department of Agriculture and one each from Princeton University and the University of Pennsylvania Museum of Archaeology and Anthropology. Two remains and 50 funerary objects of interest to the Yakutat Tlingit Tribe have not been repatriated; the two remains are held by the U.S. Department of Agriculture.

In 2023, the AgWest Farm Credit Services bank based in Spokane, Washington, sued the Alaska Native corporation based in Yakutat, Yak-Tat Kwaan Inc., seeking the repayment of $13.3 million in loans. The lawsuit has caused concerns in the tribe over the loss of their traditional lands.

== Notable citizens ==
- Elaine Abraham, tribal elder and registered nurse.

== See also ==
- List of Alaska Native tribal entities
