= Klawock Cooperative Association =

Alaska Native tribe

Klawock Cooperative Association Heinÿaa Ḵwáan (Tlingit)
- Alaska Native village
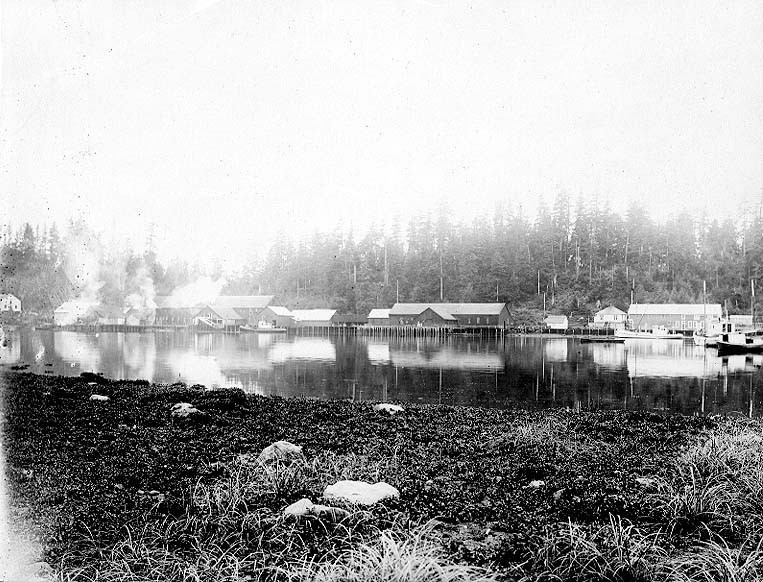
- Historical image of Klawock

- Klawock Cooperative Association
- Coordinates: 55°33′26″N 133°05′54″W
- Constitution Ratified: October 4, 1938; 87 years ago
- Capital: Klawock, Alaska

Government
  - Type: Representative democracy
  - Body: Klawock Tribal Council
  - President: Dennis Nickerson
- Demonym: Klawock Tlingit
- Time zone: UTC–09:00 (AKST)
  - Summer (DST): UTC–08:00 (AKDT)
- Website: facebook.com/klawocktribe

The Klawock Cooperative Association is a federally recognized Alaska Native tribe of Tlingit people. This Alaska Native tribe is headquartered in Klawock, Alaska Tlingit: Lawáak.

They are known as the Klawock Tlingit and Tlingit: Heinÿaa Ḵwáan.

== Government ==
The Klawock Cooperative Association is led by a democratically elected tribal council. Its president is Dennis Nickerson. The Alaska Regional Office of the Bureau of Indian Affairs serves the tribe. They ratified its constitution and corporate charter in 1938.

The tribe is a member of the National Congress of American Indians.

== Territory ==
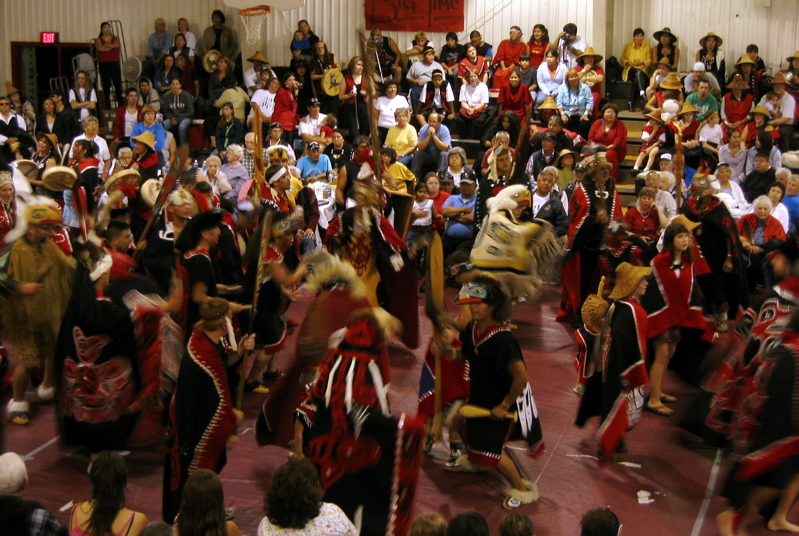
Community dance at a totem pole raising in Klawock, Alaska

Previously, the Heinÿaa Ḵwáan lived in Tuxekan, a winter settlement, but they migrated south to Klawock, which had been a summer settlement.

Klawock is on the western edge of Prince of Wales Island that is part of the Alexander Archipelago in Klawock Bay. Klawock not connected to Ketchikan by highway, so travel off the island is airplane or boat.

Three other tribes are located on Prince of Wales Island: Craig Tribal Association, Hydaburg Cooperative Association, and Organized Village of Kasaan.

== Economy ==
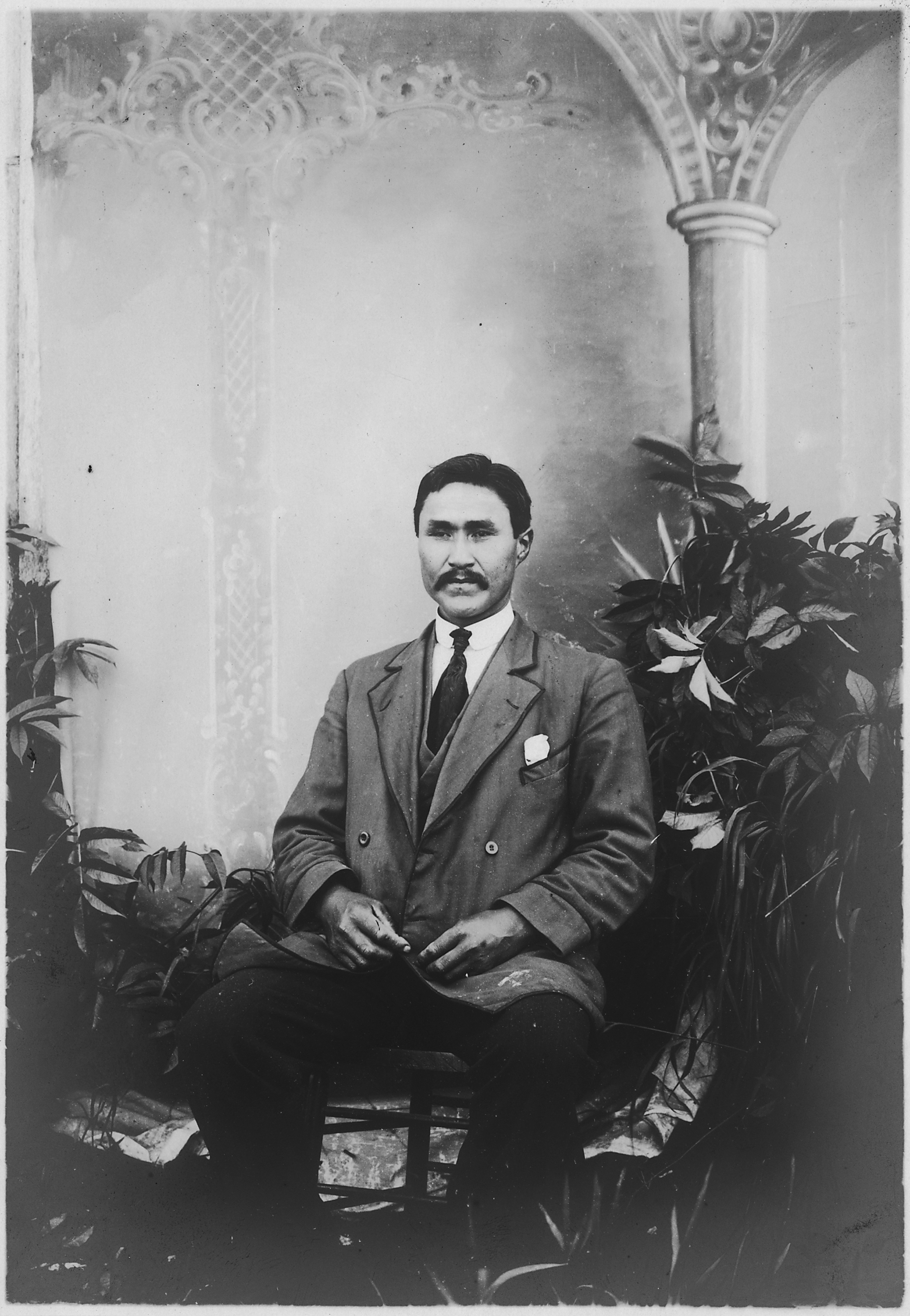
Klawock Tlingit man, photographed by Benjamin Haldane (Tsimshian, 1874–1941)

Fishing is central to the tribe's economy, as is cultural tourism and timber. The Klawock Cooperative Association is affiliated with Sealaska Corporation, an Alaska Native corporation, and the Klawock Heenya Corporation, an ANCSA Village Corporation.

== Climate change ==
Alaska Natives are already feeling the effects of climate change from increased fires, harsher storms, melting permafrost, erosion along the coasts, and weather patterns shifting. To address these threats, in 2006, 162 Alaska Native tribes, including the Klawock Cooperative Association, and corporations working with the Native American Rights Fund, signed a Climate Change resolution calling upon Congress to pass laws to reduce greenhouse gas emissions.

== Language and culture ==
The Klawock Cooperative Association speaks English and the Tlingit language.

== Notable tribal citizens ==
- Frank Peratrovich (1895–1984), businessman

== See also ==
- Culture of the Tlingit
- History of the Tlingit
