= List of Alaska Native tribal entities =

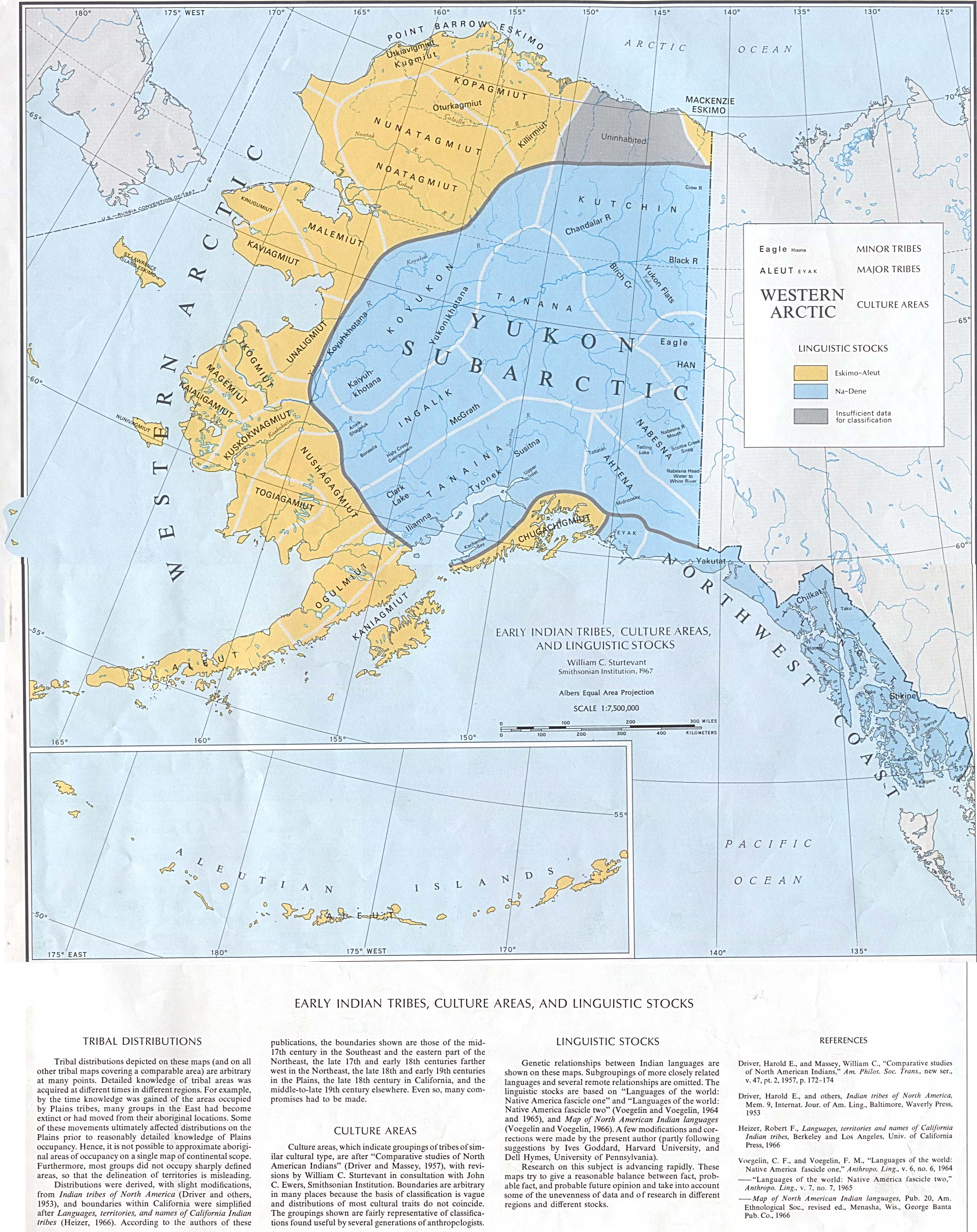
Alaska Natives: A— Na–Dene-speaking peoples: a— Yukon Subarctic : Alaskan Athabaskans b— Northwest Coast : Eyak, Tlingit, Haida, and Tsimshian B— Eskimo–Aleut-speaking peoples: a— Unangan (Aleut) b— Sugpiaq (Alutiiq): West Sugpiaq (Kaniagmiut) ve East Sugpiaq (Chugachigmiut) c— Central Alaskan Yup'ik (Ogulmiut, Togiagamiut, Nushagagmiut, Kuskokwagmiut, Kaialigamiut, Magemiut, Ikogmiut, Unaligmiut) d— Nunivak Cup'ig (Nunivagmiut) e— Inupiat (Kaviagmiut, Kinugumiut, Malemiut, Noatagmiut, Nunatagmiut, Oturkagmiut, Killirmiut, Kopagmiut, Kugmiut, Utkiavigmiut) and Uummarmiut f— Siberian Yupik (St. Lawrence Island Yupik)

This list of Alaska Native tribal entities names the federally recognized tribes in the state of Alaska.

The Alaska Native Claims Settlement Act of 1971 explains how these Alaska Native villages came to be tracked this way. This version was updated based on Federal Register, Volume 91, dated January 30, 2026 (91 FR 4102), when the number of Alaskan Native tribes entities totaled 229.

The list is maintained in alphabetical order with respect to the name of the tribe or village.

Note that while the names of Alaska Native tribal entities often include "Village of" or "Native Village of," in most cases, the tribal entity cannot be considered as identical to the city, town, or census-designated place in which the tribe is located, as some residents may be non-tribal members and a separate city government may exist. Nor should Alaska Native tribes be confused with Alaska Native Regional Corporations, which are a class of Alaska for-profit corporations created under the Alaska Native Claims Settlement Act (ANCSA) of 1971.

== A ==
- Agdaagux Tribe of King Cove
- Akiachak Native Community
- Akiak Native Community
- Alatna Village
- Aleut Community of St. Paul Island
  (See Pribilof Islands Aleut Communities of St. Paul & St. George Islands)
  (previously listed as Saint Paul Island)
- Algaaciq Native Village (St. Mary's)
- Allakaket Village
- Alutiiq Tribe of Old Harbor, previously listed as Native Village of Old Harbor and Village of Old Harbor
- Angoon Community Association
- Anvik Village
- Arctic Village, see Native Village of Venetie Tribal Government
- Asa'carsarmiut Tribe

== B ==
- Beaver Village
- Birch Creek Tribe

== C ==
- Central Council of the Tlingit & Haida Indian Tribes
- Chalkyitsik Village
- Cheesh-Na Tribe
  previously listed as Native Village of Chistochina
- Chevak Native Village
- Chickaloon Native Village
- Chignik Bay Tribal Council
  previously listed as Native Village of Chignik
- Chignik Lake Village
- Chilkat Indian Village (Klukwan)
- Chilkoot Indian Association (Haines)
- Chinik Eskimo Community (Golovin)
- Chuloonawick Native Village
- Circle Native Community
- Craig Tribal Association
  previously Craig Community Association
- Curyung Tribal Council
  previously the Native Village of Dillingham

== D ==
- Douglas Indian Association

== E ==
- Egegik Village
- Eklutna Native Village
- Emmonak Village
- Evansville Village (aka Bettles Field)

== F ==
None

== G ==
- Gulkana Village Council
  previously listed as Gulkana Village

== H ==
- Healy Lake Village
- Holy Cross Tribe
  previously listed as Holy Cross Village
- Hoonah Indian Association
- Hughes Village
- Huslia Village
- Hydaburg Cooperative Association

== I ==
- Igiugig Village
- Inupiat Community of the Arctic Slope
- Iqugmiut Traditional Council
  previously listed as Iqurmuit Traditional Council
- Ivanof Bay Tribe
  previously listed as Ivanoff Bay Tribe and Ivanoff Bay Village

== J ==
None

== K ==
- Kaguyak Village
- Kaktovik Village (aka Barter Island)
- Kasigluk Traditional Elders Council
- Kenaitze Indian Tribe
- Ketchikan Indian Community
  previously listed as Ketchikan Indian Corporation
- King Island Native Community
- King Salmon Tribe
- Klawock Cooperative Association
- Knik Tribe
- Kokhanok Village
- Koyukuk Native Village

== L ==
- Levelock Village
- Lime Village
- Louden Tribe (previously listed as Galena Village (aka Louden Village))

== M ==
- Manley Hot Springs Village
- Manokotak Village
- McGrath Native Village
- Mentasta Traditional Council
- Metlakatla Indian Community, Annette Island Reserve

== N ==
- Naknek Native Village
- Native Village of Afognak
- Native Village of Akhiok
- Native Village of Akutan
- Native Village of Aleknagik
- Native Village of Ambler
- Native Village of Atka
- Native Village of Atqasuk
  previously listed as Atqasuk Village (Atkasook)
- Native Village of Barrow Inupiat Traditional Government
- Native Village of Belkofski
- Native Village of Brevig Mission
- Native Village of Buckland
- Native Village of Cantwell
- Native Village of Chenega (aka Chanega)
- Native Village of Chignik Lagoon
- Native Village of Chitina
- Native Village of Chuathbaluk (Russian Mission, Kuskokwim)
- Native Village of Council
- Native Village of Deering
- Native Village of Diomede (aka Inalik)
- Native Village of Eagle
- Native Village of Eek
- Native Village of Ekuk
- Native Village of Ekwok
  previously listed as Ekwok Village
- Native Village of Elim
- Native Village of Eyak (Cordova)
- Native Village of False Pass
- Native Village of Fort Yukon
- Native Village of Gakona
- Native Village of Gambell
- Native Village of Georgetown
- Native Village of Goodnews Bay
- Native Village of Hamilton
- Native Village of Hooper Bay
- Native Village of Kanatak
- Native Village of Karluk
- Native Village of Kiana
- Native Village of Kipnuk
- Native Village of Kivalina
- Native Village of Kluti Kaah (aka Copper Center)
- Native Village of Kobuk
- Native Village of Kongiganak
- Native Village of Kotzebue
- Native Village of Koyuk
- Native Village of Kwigillingok
- Native Village of Kwinhagak (aka Quinhagak)
- Native Village of Larsen Bay
- Native Village of Marshall (aka Fortuna Ledge)
- Native Village of Mary's Igloo
- Native Village of Mekoryuk
- Native Village of Minto
- Native Village of Nanwalek (aka English Bay)
- Native Village of Napaimute
- Native Village of Napakiak
- Native Village of Napaskiak
- Native Village of Nelson Lagoon
- Native Village of Nightmute
- Native Village of Nikolski
- Native Village of Noatak
- Native Village of Nuiqsut (aka Nooiksut)
- Native Village of Nunam Iqua
  previously listed as Native Village of Sheldon's Point
- Native Village of Nunapitchuk
- Native Village of Ouzinkie
- Native Village of Paimiut
- Native Village of Perryville
- Native Village of Pilot Point
- Native Village of Point Hope
- Native Village of Point Lay
- Native Village of Port Graham
- Native Village of Port Heiden
- Native Village of Port Lions
- Native Village of Ruby
- Native Village of Saint Michael
- Native Village of Savoonga
- Native Village of Scammon Bay
- Native Village of Selawik
- Native Village of Shaktoolik
- Native Village of Shishmaref
- Native Village of Shungnak
- Native Village of South Naknek (previously listed as South Naknek Village)
- Native Village of Stevens
- Native Village of Tanacross
- Native Village of Tanana
- Native Village of Tatitlek
- Native Village of Tazlina
- Native Village of Teller
- Native Village of Tetlin
- Native Village of Tuntutuliak
- Native Village of Tununak
- Native Village of Tyonek
- Native Village of Unalakleet
- Native Village of Unga
- Native Village of Venetie Tribal Government (Arctic Village and Village of Venetie)
- Native Village of Wales
- Native Village of White Mountain
- Nenana Native Association
- New Koliganek Village Council
- New Stuyahok Village
- Newhalen Village
- Newtok Village
- Nikolai Village
- Ninilchik Village
- Nome Eskimo Community
- Nondalton Tribe (previously listed as Nondalton Village)
- Noorvik Native Community
- Northway Village
- Nulato Village
- Nunakauyarmiut Tribe

== O ==
- Organized Village of Grayling (aka Holikachuk)
- Organized Village of Kake
- Organized Village of Kasaan
- Organized Village of Kwethluk
- Organized Village of Saxman
- Orutsararmiut Traditional Native Council
  previously listed as Orutsararmuit Native Village (aka Bethel)
- Oscarville Traditional Village

== P ==
- Pauloff Harbor Village
- Pedro Bay Village
- Petersburg Indian Association
- Pilot Station Traditional Village
- Pitka's Point Traditional Council
  previously listed as Native Village of Pitka's Point
- Platinum Traditional Village
- Portage Creek Village (aka Ohgsenakale)
- Pribilof Islands Aleut Communities of St. Paul & St. George Islands (Saint George Island and Saint Paul Island)

== Q ==
- Qagan Tayagungin Tribe of Sand Point
  previously listed as Qagan Tayagungin Tribe of Sand Point Village
- Qawalangin Tribe of Unalaska

== R ==
- Rampart Village

== S ==
- Saint George Island
  See Pribilof Islands Aleut Communities of St. Paul & St. George Islands
- Salamatof Tribe
  previously listed as Village of Salamatoff
- Seldovia Village Tribe
- Shageluk Native Village
- Sitka Tribe of Alaska
- Skagway Village
- Stebbins Community Association
- Sun'aq Tribe of Kodiak
  previously listed as Shoonaq' Tribe of Kodiak

== T ==
- Takotna Village
- Tangirnaq Native Village
  previously listed as Lesnoi Village (aka Woody Island)
- Telida Village
- Traditional Village of Togiak
- Tuluksak Native Community
- Twin Hills Village

== U ==
- Ugashik Village
- Umkumiut Native Village
  previously listed as Umkumiute Native Village

== V ==
- Village of Alakanuk
- Village of Anaktuvuk Pass
- Village of Aniak
- Village of Atmautluak
- Village of Bill Moore's Slough
- Village of Chefornak
- Village of Clarks Point
- Village of Crooked Creek
- Village of Dot Lake
- Village of Iliamna
- Village of Kalskag
- Village of Kaltag
- Village of Kotlik
- Village of Lower Kalskag
- Village of Ohogamiut
- Village of Red Devil
- Village of Sleetmute
- Village of Solomon
- Village of Stony River
- Village of Venetie
  see Native Village of Venetie Tribal Government
- Village of Wainwright

== W ==
- Wrangell Cooperative Association

== X ==
None

== Y ==
- Yakutat Tlingit Tribe
- Yupiit of Andreafski

== Z ==
None

== See also ==
- Alaska Native corporation
- Native Americans in the United States
- List of federally recognized tribes in the United States, Lower 48
- List of federally recognized tribes by state, Lower 48
- List of Indian reservations in the United States
- List of historical Indian reservations in the United States
- State-recognized tribes in the United States
- List of organizations that self-identify as Native American tribes
- Circumpolar peoples
- Indigenous peoples of the Subarctic
- Indigenous peoples of the Pacific Northwest Coast
- Federal recognition of Native Hawaiians
  - Legal status of Hawaii
- List of First Nations governments
- List of First Nations peoples
- List of Indian reserves in Canada
