= Woody Island (Alaska) =

Archaeological site in Alaska, United States

Native name: Tangirnaq
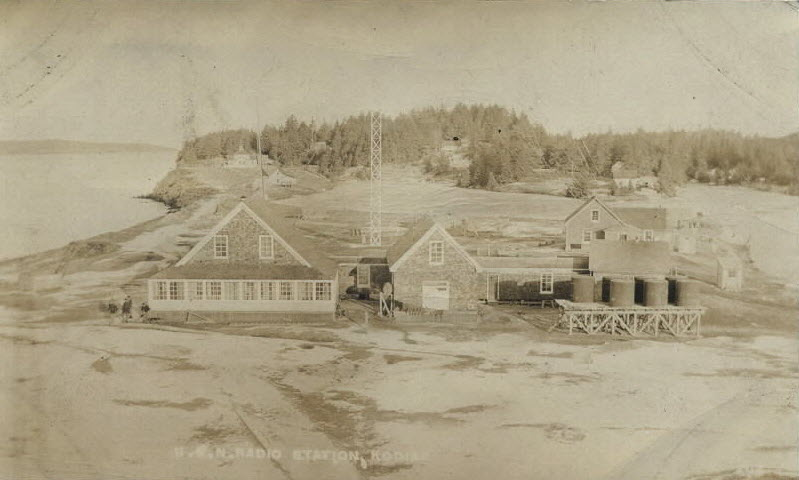
- U.S. Navy wireless station, Woody Island, 1915
- Interactive map of Woody Island

Geography
- Location: Pacific Ocean
- Coordinates: 57°47′N 152°20′W
- Archipelago: Kodiak Archipelago
- Area: 5.04 sq mi (13.1 km^{2})
- Highest elevation: 160 ft (49 m)
- Highest point: Highest Point

Administration
- United States
- State: Alaska
- Borough: Kodiak Island

Demographics
- Population: 0 (2010)
- Woody Island Historic Archeological District
- U.S. National Register of Historic Places
- U.S. Historic district
- Location within Alaska
- Location: Address restricted
- Nearest city: Kodiak, Alaska
- NRHP reference No.: 14001196
- Added to NRHP: January 27, 2015

Woody Island (Russian: Остров Вуд, originally Лесной остров) is located in Chiniak Bay, 2.6 miles (4.2 km) east of Kodiak, Alaska. It was originally settled by the Alutiiq, an Alaska Native people, who called themselves Tangirnarmiut, "the people of Tangirnaq." They inhabited and used Woody Island for thousands of years.

The Russians called the island Ostrov Leisnoi and established an agricultural colony there in 1792. The U.S. Post Office was officially designated Wood Island in 1894, and it was the primary coastal settlement for commerce and trade for many years. The first road in Alaska was built on Woody Island. The island has also undergone four periods of occupation by non-Native people, and is largely unoccupied today. The island is approximately 2.8 miles long from north to south and 1.8 miles wide and 13 miles in circumference.

The Woody Island Historic Archeological District, comprising sites of archaeological importance on the island was listed on the National Register of Historic Places in 2015. The island is part of the homelands of the Tangirnaq Native Village, a federally recognized tribe of Alutiiq.

== Alutiiq settlement ==
The Alutiiq people have used the island for "whaling, fishing, wood-working, sweat-baths, extensive trade." Historically, they built "large multi-roomed houses, and large villages with complex social ranking." When the Russians arrived in the 18th century, the Native people were initially successful in driving them off. There followed a short period of accommodation and trade, after which the Russians engaged in brutal subjugation of the people, resulting in "epidemics, forced relocations, and extermination of those who resisted."

Russian naval officer Gavriil Davydov observed an Alutiiq winter ceremony on Woody Island in 1802. He wrote:

The spectators consisted of native inhabitants, dressed in their finery. The women were wearing their best dresses such as: cloth, parkas, or those made from marmot skin or eider-down, almost all had bones through their nostrils, or beads threaded onto sticks, while on their arms and legs, their necks, and in their ears were as many beads as they could fit in, or all they had. Everyone was very pleased with the performance. During the rest of the festival the women kept bringing in food and serving it to people. They only had to look away for a moment and one of the young boys would grab the dish and run away; then the women would start chasing, and everyone roared with laughter.

In 1805 a village on the east side of Woody Island had an Alutiiq population of 54. A smallpox epidemic struck the region in 1837, and the Russians forcefully amalgamated the survivors into seven villages, among them a village on Woody Island.

== Industry and commerce ==
The Russian American Commercial Company operated an ice company on the island beginning in 1852. They dammed Lake Tanignak, increasing its depth substantially. They cut and shipped ice south to California. The company brought in the first iron rails to haul ice and horses to power a horse-powered saw which cut the ice into blocks. A sawmill was built to produce not lumber, but sawdust that was used to insulate the ice for shipment south. The first road built in Alaska was graded around the island to allow the horses to be exercised. In 1867 the company was renamed the Kodiak Ice Co.

For much of the late half of the 19th century, many of the Aluttiq people on Woody Island were enslaved by the Russians to work for the ice harvesting companies during the winter. Conscripted by the Russians, they hunted sea otters and fur seals during the summer for their highly prized fur. In 1872 a Russian Orthodox Church was built on Woody Island. The church exerted a strong influence over the native population, replacing in many instances native ceremonies and observances with church-centered activities.

The sea otter and fur seal populations declined rapidly in the latter half of the 19th century due to over-harvesting, with about 100,000 sea otters and a correspondingly high number of fur seals being taken each year. By 1911 only about 2000 sea otters remained in 13 small remnant populations, making hunting unprofitable. Commercial taking of sea otters and fur seals were prohibited by the Fur Seal Treaty. The Alutiiq were permitted to hunt them for subsistence purposes only.

In 1886, the Island was the commercial center for the Kodiak area. Services included the ice harvesting operation, a boat yard, a grist mill, the Alaska Commercial Company (formerly the Russian-American Company) wharf, and the only roads in Alaska connecting these facilities. The North American Commercial Company, a fur trading enterprise, established a presence there in 1891, including a store.

=== Religious usage ===
Ernest and Ida Roscoe built a Baptist Mission and orphanage on Woody Island in 1893. Over the next 20 years, the mission added a girls' quarters, boys' dormitory, office building, barn, carpenter shop, cannery, silo, and dining room. The mission provided homes for Alutiiq children who had lost their parents, but the Baptist missionaries sometimes brought children to the orphanage, even against their parents' will. The main building burned down in 1925, was rebuilt, and burned again in 1937. The mission was then relocated to Kodiak on the mainland where a greater variety of services were more readily available.

=== U.S. Navy wireless station ===
The United States Navy built a Wireless station on the island in 1911. It included two large masts 225 feet (69 m) tall. During the eruption of the Novarupta volcano on the Alaska Peninsula in 1912, over 18 inches (460 mm) of ash was deposited on the island. Everyone but the watchman evacuated to Kodiak. During the ash fall, lightning struck one of the antenna which started a fire that burned most of the wireless station. Harry Martin, a survivor of the volcanic eruption, told U.S. Navy radioman Bart Phelps about the experience in 1924:

What they didn't know was that a jolt of lighting or a heavy charge of static electricity had hit the antenna causing a fire which destroyed most of the station, their living quarters included. None of the men had a bank account in the States. The dresser drawer was their bank. Nothing could be safer. Martin said he lost over $900 and that was pretty close to a year's pay. He got it back after many months of waiting for the Navy to confirm the loss. After Mt. Katmai blew up the only animals left were the bears. While I was there they had started restocking ptarmigan, rabbits, etc. It was in 1926 when they brought in the first deer.

The wireless station was rebuilt and updated in 1914. The wireless station was decommissioned on February 28, 1931, and shortly thereafter the Federal government allowed the Territory of Alaska to use the remaining buildings for the Longwood School.

After the mission and orphanage was relocated to the mainland, the entire island's population declined rapidly. The Longwood School enrollment dropped from 71 in 1937 to 20 in 1939, and the school was permanently closed. Many of the natives moved to Kodiak where they were less dependent on subsistence living and could find jobs.

=== Air station built ===
In 1941, the Civil Aeronautics Administration built the Kadiak Naval Air Station including a runway, flight service station, remote air ground, remote transmitter, low frequency range beacon, and VHF link terminal facilities. These gathered and relayed weather and other aeronautical data to pilots. During World War II up to forty technicians and their families lived on the island. They maintained the teletypes, transmitters, and radio receivers essential to supporting military and civilian aircraft operating in the North Pacific.

In 1951 or 1952 the Russian Orthodox Church building, which had been abandoned for many years, was torn down. Former Navy facilities were converted to apartments and a school was built on in 1951 for the small community. The facility was automated in the early 1970s and the majority of the remaining FAA complex burned in 1979.

== Current use ==
During the 1950s, the American Baptist Church began offering a non-denominational summer camp on the island, which is still in operation today. The FAA still maintains a radio beacon on the island for aircraft directional use. There is no longer any public transportation to the island. The island is inhabited today by two "hermits" and is visited by two families owning summer homes there. The majority of land on Woody Island is private property, except for the Woody Island State Recreation Site a 112 acres (45 ha) wilderness area belonging to Alaska State Parks. The island is designated as the Leisnoi Alaska Native Village Statistical Area.

== Demographics ==
Historical population
Census	Pop.	Note	%±
1880	157		—
1900	229		—
1910	168		−26.6%
1920	104		−38.1%
1930	116		11.5%
1940	54		−53.4%
1950	111		105.6%
1960	78		−29.7%
1970	41		−47.4%
1980	5		−87.8%
2010	0		—
U.S. Decennial Census

Woody Island (or Leisnoi) first appeared on the 1880 U.S. Census as the unincorporated village of "Lesnova." Of 157 residents, 99 were Alutiiq, 56 were mixed Russian and Native, and 2 were white. It did not appear on the 1890 census. It returned in 1900 as "Wood Island Settlement." In 1910–40, it returned as "Wood Island." In 1950–80, it returned as Woody Island. It was designated an Alaskan Native Village Statistical Area (ANVSA) in 1980. It did not appear on the 1990 or 2000 censuses. It last returned on the 2010 census as the ANVSA of Leisnoi, but reported 0 residents.

== See also ==
- National Register of Historic Places listings in Kodiak Island Borough, Alaska
