= Native Village of Atka =

Federally recognized Alaska Native tribe

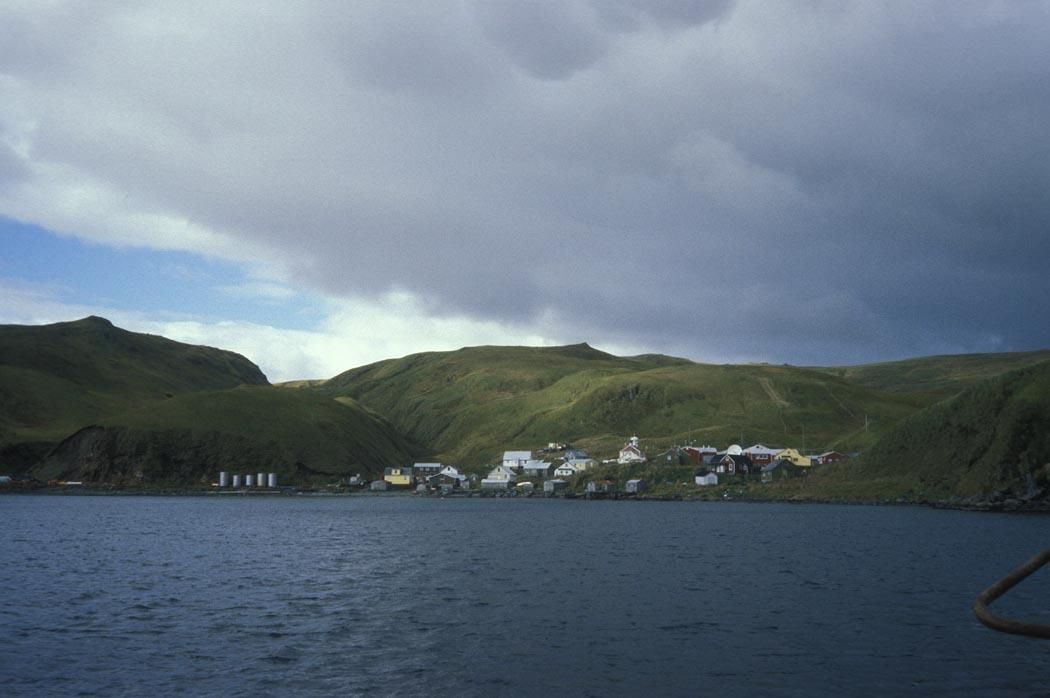
- People: Aleuts
- Headquarters: Atka, Alaska, US

Government
- Chief: Crystal Dushkin

The Native Village of Atka is a federally recognized Aleut Alaska Native tribal entity.

== About ==
The Native Village of Atka is headquartered at the city of Atka on Atka Island of the Aleutians West Census Area. As of 2005, the tribe had 180 enrolled citizens.

== See also ==
- List of Alaska Native tribal entities
