= Native Village of Nikolski =

Federally recognized Alaska Native tribe

- People: Aleuts
- Headquarters: Nikolski, Alaska, US

Government
- Chief: Arnold Dushkin

Tribal Council
- Nikolski Tribal Council

The Native Village of Nikolski is a federally recognized Aleut Alaska Native tribal entity.

== About ==
The Native Village of Nikolski is headquartered at the city of Nikolski on Umnak Island of the Aleutians West Census Area. As of 2005, the tribe had 59 enrolled citizens.

== See also ==
- List of Alaska Native tribal entities
