= Unga, Alaska =

Ghost town on Unga Island in the Aleutians (1833-1969)

Coordinates: 55°11′03″N 160°30′18″W

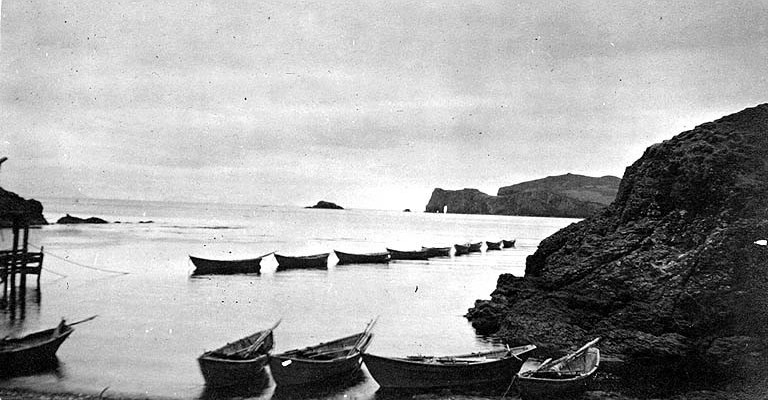
Photograph of fishing boats at Unga by John Nathan Cobb

Unga (Unangam tunuu: Uĝnaasaqax̂) is a ghost town on Unga Island in the Aleutians East Borough of the U.S. state of Alaska, about two miles west of Sand Point. The island's length is 15 miles (24 km). Unga's altitude is 59 feet (18 m).

== History ==
It was settled by Aleuts in 1833 and was named Delarov, referring to Evstratii Ivanovich Delarov of the Shelikhov-Golikov Company, with a population of 116. The village was reported as Ougnagok by F. P. Lutke in 1836.

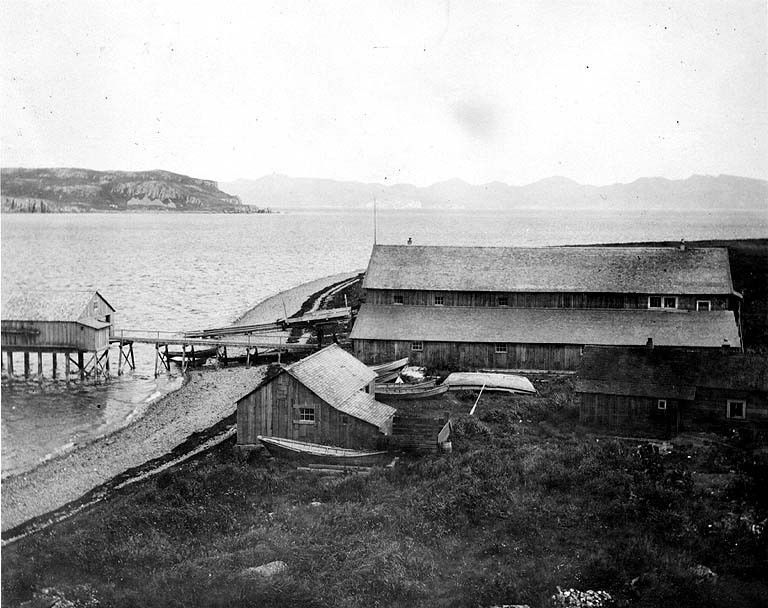
Alaska Codfish Co. station on Squaw Harbor, Unga Island, August 1913

The first post office was established in 1888 and in 1890 Apollo Mining Co. was established. In 1894, its name was changed to Unga. The post office was closed in 1958. In 1969, the last family left Unga. Most of the people who left Unga moved to Sand Point.

== Demographics ==
Historical population
Census	Pop.	Note	%±
1880	185		—
1890	159		−14.1%
1900	175		10.1%
1910	108		−38.3%
1920	313		189.8%
1930	150		−52.1%
1940	152		1.3%
1950	107		−29.6%
1960	43		−59.8%
1980	0		—
U.S. Decennial Census

Unga first appeared on the 1880 U.S. Census as the unincorporated village of "Ounga." Of 185 residents, 101 were Aleut, 69 were Creole (Mixed Russian and Native) and 15 were White. The leader of the town was known as the Unga Wizard. It returned in 1890 under the present spelling of Unga and also included the Oakland fishing station, Apollo mine & Squaw Harbor mine. Of 159 residents, 109 were Creole, 48 were White and two were Asian (oddly, no non-Creole Aleuts or Natives appeared). It continued to return on every successive census until 1960. It did not return in 1970. It was designated an Alaskan Native Village Statistical Area (ANVSA) in 1980, but was uninhabited. It has not reported again since.

== See also ==
- Native Village of Unga
