= Native Village of False Pass =

Federally recognized Alaska Native tribe

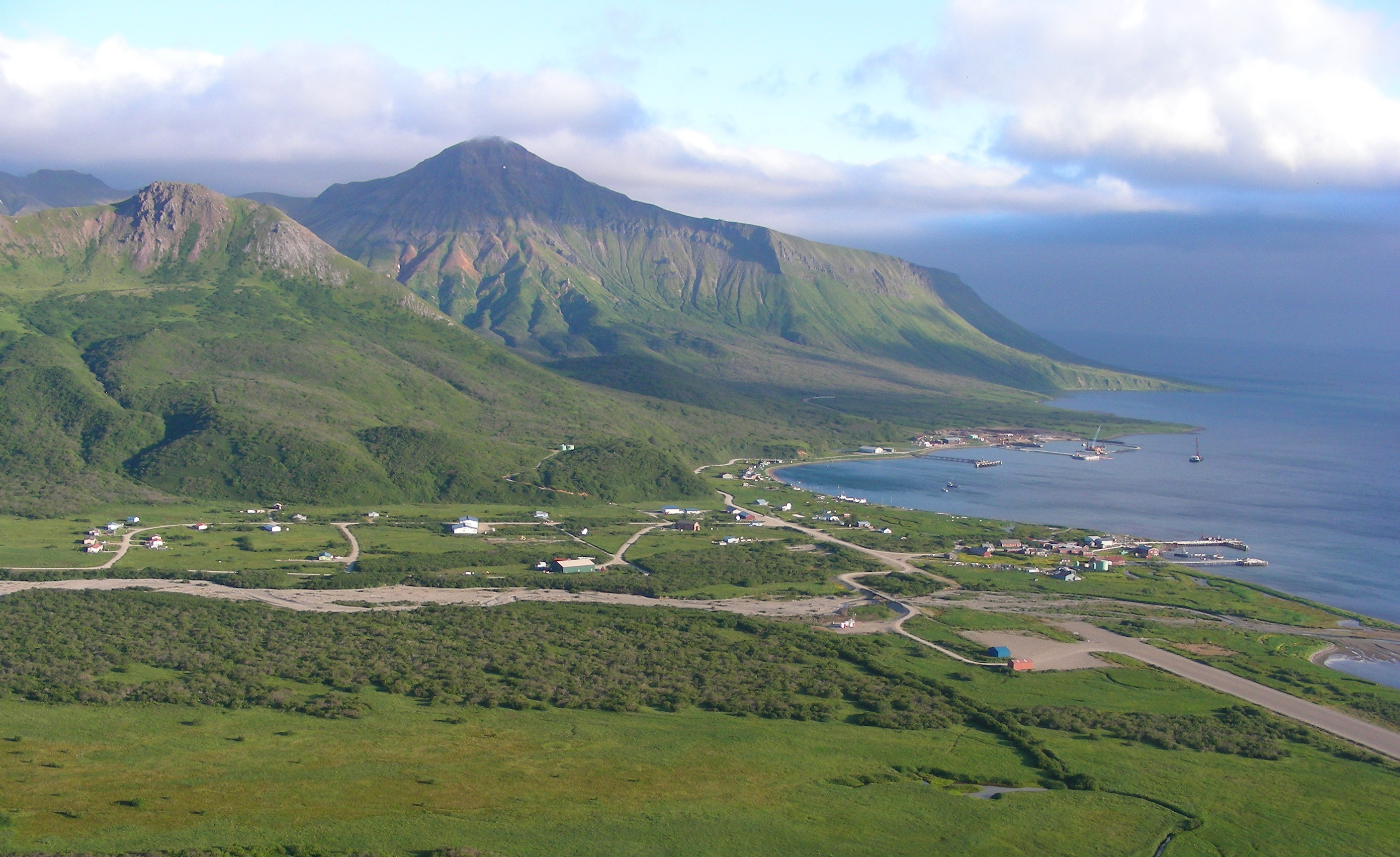
- People: Aleuts
- Headquarters: False Pass, Alaska, US

Government
- Chief: Travis Hoblet

Tribal Council
- False Pass Tribal Council

The Native Village of False Pass is a federally recognized Aleut Alaska Native tribal entity.

== About ==
The Native Village of False Pass is headquartered at the city of False Pass on Unimak Island of the Aleutians East Borough. As of 2005, the tribe had 96 enrolled citizens.

== See also ==
- List of Alaska Native tribal entities
