= Native Village of Belkofski =

Federally recognized Alaska Native tribe

- People: Aleuts
- Headquarters: Belkofski, Alaska, US

Government
- Chief: Lynn Mack

Tribal Council
- Belkofski Tribal Council

The Native Village of Belkofski is a federally recognized Aleut Alaska Native tribal entity.

== About ==
The Native Village of Belkofski is headquartered at the unincorporated community of Belkofski in the Aleutians East Borough. Aleuts were first settled at Belkofski in 1823 when then were brought to the settlement by Russian colonizers so they could harvest sea otters.

As of 2005, the tribe had 61 enrolled citizens.

== See also ==
- List of Alaska Native tribal entities
