= Ketchikan Indian Community =

Alaska Native tribe

Ketchikan Indian Community Kichx̱áan (Tlingit)
- Alaska Native village
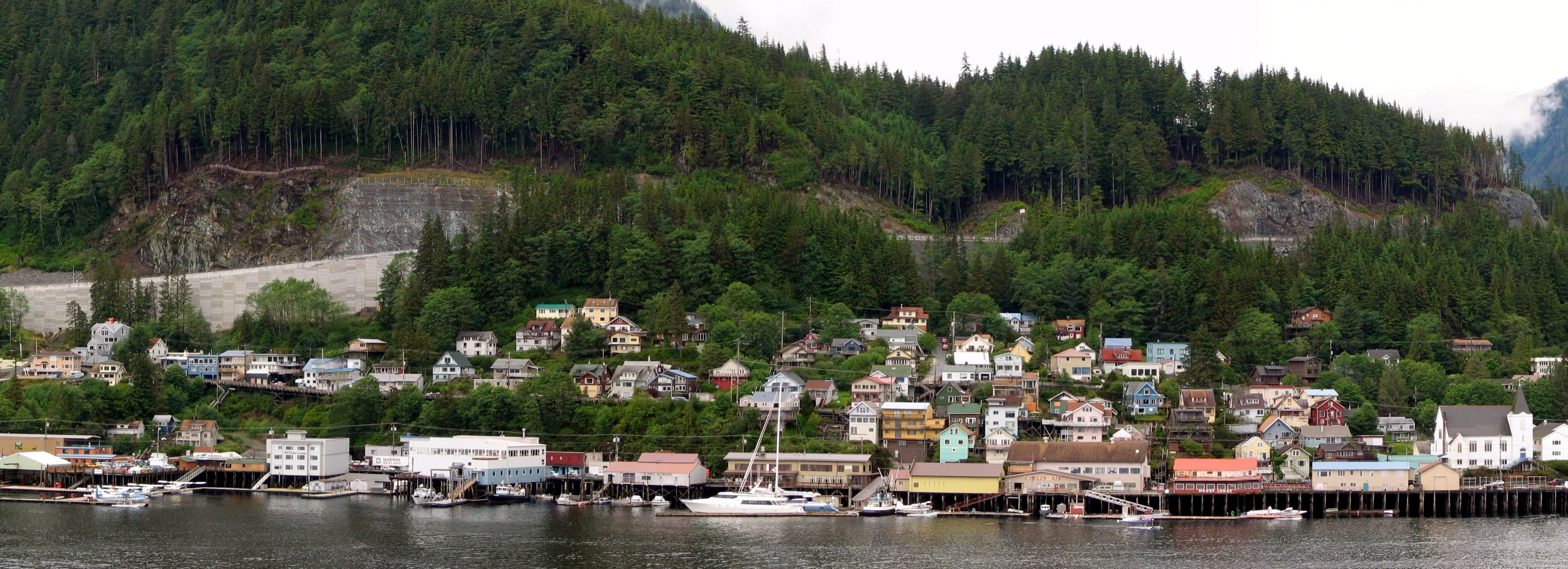
- View of the shoreline at Ketchikan, Alaska

- Ketchikan Indian Community
- Coordinates: 55°21′10″N 131°41′5″W
- 1940 Constitution Ratified: January 27, 1940; 86 years ago
- 1979 Constitution Ratified: January 15, 1979; 47 years ago
- 2017 Constitution Ratified: October 18, 2017; 8 years ago
- Capital: Ketchikan, Alaska

Government
  - Type: Representative democracy
  - Body: Ketchikan Tribal Council
  - President: Gloria Burns
  - Vice President: Gianna SaanuGa

Population
  - Estimate (2026): 6,000
- Demonym: Tlingit
- Time zone: UTC– 09:00 (AKST)
  - Summer (DST): UTC– 08:00 (AKDT)
- Website: Official website

The Ketchikan Indian Community is a federally recognized Native American tribe in the United States. This Alaska Native tribe is headquartered in Ketchikan, Alaska. Tribal citizens include descendants of Tlingit, Haida, Tsimshian, Aleut and other tribal nations.

== Government ==
The tribe is governed by a democratically elected Tribal Council. The Council President is Gloria Burns.

The Ketchikan Indian Community first ratified their constitution and by-laws on January 27, 1940, under the name, Ketchikan Indian Corporation. The Ketchikan Indian Community is the federally recognized tribal government, exercising governmental authority and providing services to its tribal citizens. At a regional level, Ketchikan Indian Community tribal citizens are served by Sealaska Corporation, the ANCSA‑created Alaska Native Regional Corporation for Southeast Alaska.

The Ketchikan Indian Community traces its modern governmental structure to earlier constitutions adopted under the name Ketchikan Indian Corporation. Its first constitution and bylaws were ratified on January 27, 1940, under the authority of the Indian Reorganization Act, and established the original framework for membership, governance, and council powers. A revised constitution was later ratified on January 15, 1979, continuing the corporation's governance prior to its transition to the present‑day Ketchikan Indian Community.

=== SEAlaska Corporation and "Landless Communities" ===
Sealaska Corporation recognizes and supports the five Southeast Alaska Native communities that were excluded from village‑corporation status under the Alaska Native Claims Settlement Act (ANCSA): Ketchikan, Wrangell, Petersburg, Haines, and Tenakee Springs. These communities are commonly referred to as “landless communities.” Sealaska provides financial support, advocacy, and organizational backing to efforts seeking congressional legislation that would allow these communities to form their own ANCSA village corporations and receive land selections. Sealaska has funded Alaska Natives Without Land initiatives, supported public outreach campaigns, and worked with Alaska's congressional delegation to advance “landless” legislation in multiple sessions of Congress.

== Services ==
=== Healthcare ===
The Ketchikan Indian Community Tribal Health Clinic provides comprehensive healthcare services to Alaska Native and American Indian patients, operating under a self‑governance compact with the Indian Health Service. Since assuming responsibility for local healthcare delivery in 1997, the clinic has expanded its services to include primary care, behavioral health, diabetes care, laboratory services, and patient referral support. KIC operates a modern ambulatory health facility and a dedicated behavioral health center, maintains accreditation through the Accreditation Association for Ambulatory Health Care, and oversees an Advisory Health Board that guides policy and long‑term planning. The clinic serves all eligible Alaska Native and American Indian patients in the Ketchikan area and offers after‑hours triage, patient education resources, and culturally informed care.

=== Housing ===
The Ketchikan Indian Community Housing Authority provides a range of housing services for income‑qualified Alaska Native and American Indian residents, including affordable family, elder, and veteran rental units; home‑improvement assistance programs that fund essential health and safety repairs; an Elder Energy Assistance Program offering limited annual support for heating costs; a Home Buy‑Down Program that helps eligible buyers with inspections, down payments, and closing costs; and a student housing voucher program for enrolled tribal members pursuing accredited higher education. These programs are designed to expand access to safe, affordable housing and support long‑term stability for tribal citizens.

=== Social Services ===
The Ketchikan Indian Community Social Services Department provides programs that support the safety, stability, and well‑being of tribal members and their families. The Ketchikan Indian Community's Domestic Violence Program provides support services to victims of domestic violence, sexual assault, sex trafficking, and stalking, including crisis intervention, group support, legal advocacy and court accompaniment, hospital accompaniment and medical advocacy, as well as financial and transportation assistance. The ICWA Intervention service assists families involved in child‑welfare proceedings by providing advocacy, support, and guidance to help protect the rights of eligible children and ensure compliance with the Indian Child Welfare Act. The New Beginnings Women's Group offers advocacy and supportive small‑group gatherings for women who have experienced domestic violence or sexual assault, providing a safe, relationship‑focused space centered on mutual support, empowerment, traditional healing practices, and safety planning. The Elder Caregiving Program provides in‑home support and respite services for Elders and their caregivers, offering hands‑on assistance with accessing resources, help with applications, and transportation for meals, medical visits, prescription pick‑ups, and other essential appointments. The Social Services Department provides home‑delivered meals to elders and others who are unable to leave their homes, along with On‑Site Congregate Meals that create a safe, social setting for Elders to gather and share nutritious food together.

=== Education and Training ===
The Education and Training Department provides opportunities for KIC tribal members to pursue their educational and vocational goals by identifying barriers to success and offering supports that promote self‑sufficiency, well‑being, and cultural heritage. Its programs are organized into four areas—Employment & Training Services, Post‑Secondary Services, Cultural Education, and Youth Services—and are guided by a vision that every tribal member has access to the resources needed to achieve success at every stage of life.

=== Cultural Resources ===
The Cultural Resources Department focuses on stewarding, conserving, and protecting places, practices, and environments of cultural and historical importance to the Ketchikan Indian Community. Established in 2013, the department builds on earlier environmental initiatives begun in 2005 and works to promote traditional ecological knowledge, safeguard waterways and forest ecosystems, monitor environmental conditions, and co‑manage natural resources with federal and state partners. Its mission emphasizes maintaining the Tribe's traditional lifeways by supporting cultural continuity and ensuring long‑term access to the land and resources central to KIC identity.

== See also ==
- List of Alaska Native tribal entities
