= Elaine Abraham =

- Born: Chuu Shah; June 19, 1929; Yakutat, Alaska
- Died: May 18, 2016 (aged 86)
- Education: Sage Memorial Hospital School of Nursing, Alaska Pacific University
- Occupations: Nurse, education administrator
- Employer(s): Sheldon Jackson College, University of Alaska

Elaine Elizabeth Abraham (June 19, 1929 – May 18, 2016) was a Yakutat Tlingit Tribe elder and registered nurse who contributed to improving health care delivery in rural Alaska. Later active professionally in the field of education, she assisted with the creation of the Alaska Native Language Center, and, as a statewide administrator at the University of Alaska, in 1976, led the establishment of community colleges in underserved parts of the state.

== Biography ==
=== Early life ===
Abraham was born in Yakutat, Alaska in 1929. Tlingit was her first language, and her Tlingit name was Chuu Shah. She was the daughter of Teikweidi, one of the last traditional clan leaders of the village, and his wife Susie Bremner, granddaughter of John James Bremner, a Scottish prospector and guide, who helped the U.S. Army explore the Copper River area in the 1880s. Elaine Abraham learned English at the village school, and attended a boarding school, the Sheldon Jackson High School/College, in Sitka, Alaska, also historically within Tlingit territory, on Baranof Island.

=== Nursing ===
She studied at the Sage Memorial School of Nursing, in Granado, Arizona, graduating at the top of her class, in 1952, and went on to work for two years as a nurse on Navajo reservations in Arizona. She then returned to Alaska, and served in hospitals in Juneau, Sitka (at the Mount Edgecumbe School), and Bethel, at a time when diphtheria and tuberculosis were predominant health threats in those areas.

She played a leading role in the opening of the Alaska Native Health Services Hospital in Anchorage in 1954. In the early 1960s, she worked together with Dr. James Justice at Mt. Edgecumbe Hospital, in Sitka, in organizing the Southeast Health Aide Program, to meet the healthcare needs of Alaskan Natives living in remote villages; that program became the model for the statewide Alaska Native Health Aide Program.

=== Education administration ===
In the early 1970s, after retiring from nursing, Abraham pursued a bachelor's degree in human resources development, as well as a masters in "Teaching in Multi-Ethnic Education," both at Alaska Pacific University, in Anchorage. Subsequently, she served in administrative posts at Sheldon Jackson College, in Sitka, beginning as associate dean of students, then becoming director of special services, and, finally, vice president for institutional development. While at Sheldon Jackson she initiated the Tlingit and Haida Language Teachers Training Program, and contributed to the writing of the Alaska Legislation for Bilingual Education.

In 1976 Abraham joined the University of Alaska system as vice president of the newly created Division of Rural Educational Affairs, based in Anchorage, becoming the first woman and the first Native American to hold a senior statewide administrative position at the university. During her brief tenure (the position was eliminated shortly later in an institutional reorganization), she expanded educational opportunities by supporting the establishment of new community college campuses in rural parts of the state.

The following year she moved to Anchorage Community College (at the time a separate institution; as of 1987 part of the University of Alaska system), where she founded and helped develop the Native Student Services over a period of 17 years. As an administrator she arranged the first in-depth survey of Native students, in 1983, gathering insights to improve services for them; and established the position of Native Student Coordinator, as a channel for continued student input. Under Abraham the NSS fostered collaboration and mutual support among Native students, and also developed closer ties with the Native community in Anchorage.

Abraham later chaired the Board of Commissioners of the Alaska Native Science Commission, a non-profit organization founded in 1993 to support relationships between research scientists and Alaskan Native communities.

== Honors and awards ==
- 1973: American Indian Achievement Award, given by the Indian Council Fire, of Chicago
- 1974: Title of "Distinguished Alaskan," conferred by the Alaska State Legislature
- 2011: Inducted into the Alaska Women's Hall of Fame
