= Native Village of Point Lay =

Federally recognized Alaska Native tribe

- People: Iñupiat
- Headquarters: Point Lay, Alaska, US

Government
- Chief: James Henry

Tribal Council
- Point Lay Tribal Council

The Native Village of Point Law is a federally recognized Iñupiat Alaska Native tribal entity.

== About ==
The Village of Point Lay is headquartered in the city of Point Lay in the North Slope Borough of Alaska. As of 2005, the tribe had 200 enrolled citizens.

== See also ==
- List of Alaska Native tribal entities
