= Village of Wainwright =

Federally recognized Alaska Native tribe

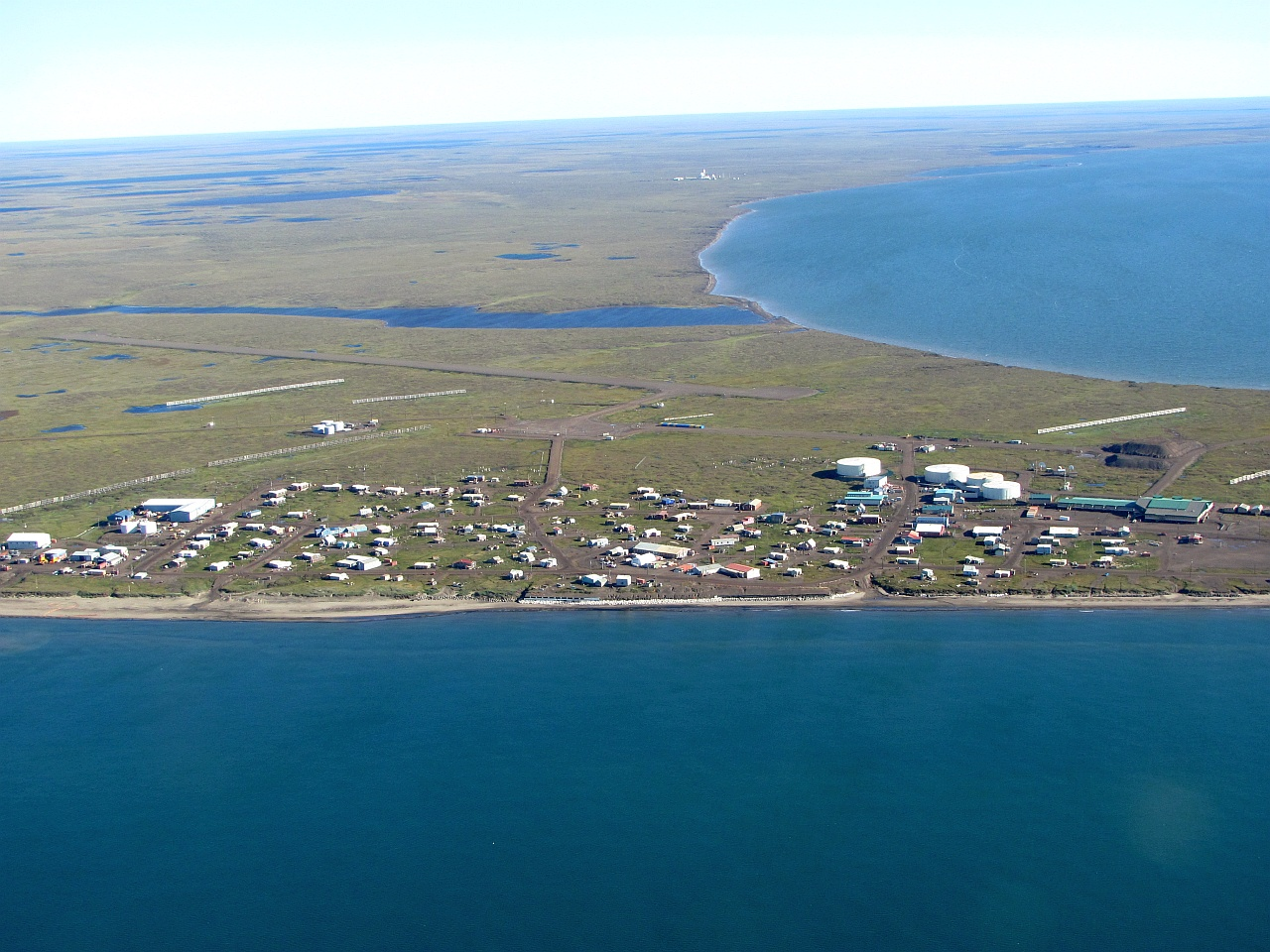
- People: Iñupiat
- Headquarters: Wainwright, Alaska, US

Government
- Chief: John Hopson

Tribal Council
- Village of Wainwright Tribal Council

The Village of Wainwright is a federally recognized Iñupiat Alaska Native tribal entity.

== About ==
The Village of Wainwright is headquartered in Wainwright, Alaska. As of 2005, the tribe had 602 enrolled citizens.

== See also ==
- List of Alaska Native tribal entities
