= Native Village of Point Hope =

Federally recognized Alaska Native tribe

- People: Iñupiat
- Headquarters: Point Hope, Alaska, US

Government
- Chief: Eva Kinneeveauk

Tribal Council
- Point Hope Tribal Council

The Native Village of Point Hope is a federally recognized Iñupiat Alaska Native tribal entity.

== About ==
The Village of Point Hope is headquartered in the city of Point Hope in the North Slope Borough of Alaska. As of 2005, the tribe had 841 enrolled citizens.

== See also ==
- List of Alaska Native tribal entities
