= Native Village of Eek =

Alaska Native village

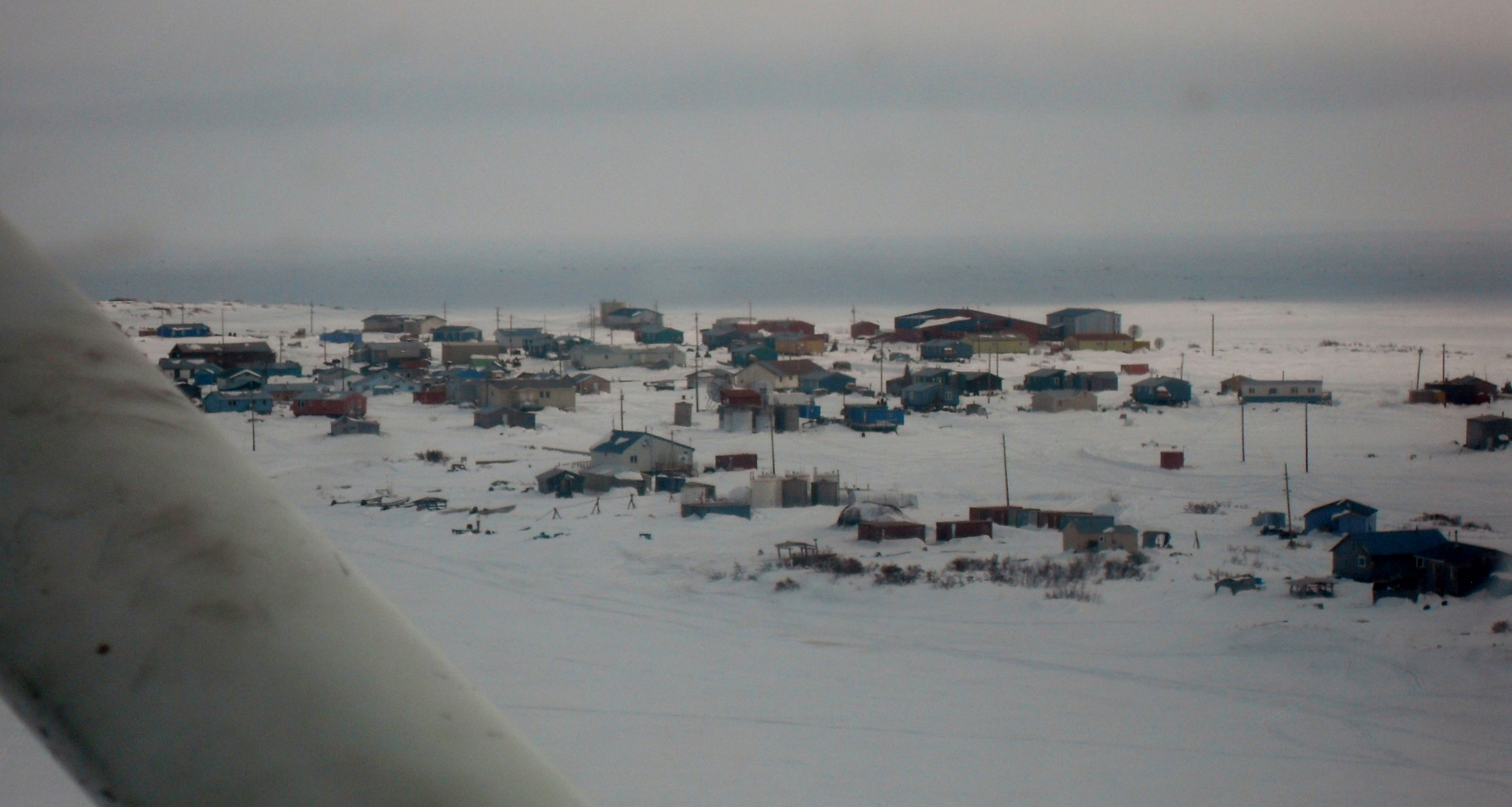
- People: Yup'ik
- Headquarters: Eek, Alaska, US

Government
- Chief: George Alexie

The Native Village of Eek is a federally recognized Yup'ik Alaska Native tribal entity.

== About ==
The Native Village of Eek is headquartered in the city of Eek in the Bethel Census Area.

== History ==
As of 2005, the tribe had 278 enrolled citizens.

In 2020, the village ordered a community-wide lock-down in response to the COVID-19 pandemic.

In 2023, the Native Village of Eek and several other Alaska Native tribes joined a lawsuit against Donlin Gold, LLC, a mining corporation, alleging that the mine was a public health danger and did not have proper permits. The State of Alaska sided with the mining corporation.

== See also ==
- List of Alaska Native tribal entities
- Eek, Alaska
