= Native Village of Unga =

Federally recognized Alaska Native tribe

- People: Aleuts
- Headquarters: Unga, Alaska, US

Government
- Chief: John Foster

Tribal Council
- Unga Tribal Council

The Native Village of Unga is a federally recognized Aleut Alaska Native tribal entity.

== About ==
The Native Village of Unga is headquartered in the city of Sand Point on Popof Island of the Aleutians East Borough. It is named after Unga, Alaska, which is now a ghost town. It is one of three federally recognized Aleut tribes in Sand Point. As of 2005, the tribe had 87 enrolled citizens.

== See also ==
- List of Alaska Native tribal entities
