= Native Village of Nelson Lagoon =

Federally recognized Alaska Native tribe

- People: Aleuts
- Headquarters: Nelson Lagoon, Alaska, US

Government
- Chief: Angela Jonson

Tribal Council
- Nelson Lagoon Tribal Council

The Native Village of Nelson Lagoon is a federally recognized Aleut Alaska Native tribal entity.

== About ==
The Native Village of Nelson Lagoon is headquartered at the city of Nelson Lagoon in the Aleutians East Borough. Historically, Nelson Lagoon was a summer fishing camp for Aleuts. As of 2005, the tribe had 50 enrolled citizens.

== See also ==
- List of Alaska Native tribal entities
