= Qagan Tayagungin Tribe of Sand Point =

Federally recognized Alaska Native tribe

- People: Aleuts
- Headquarters: Sand Point, Alaska, US

Government
- Chief: Glen Gardner

Tribal Council
- Qagan Tayagungin Tribal Council

The Qagan Tayagungin Tribe of Sand Point is a federally recognized Aleut Alaska Native tribal entity.

== About ==
The Qagan Tayagungin Tribe of Sand Point Village is headquartered at the city of Sand Point on Popof Island of the Aleutians East Borough. It is one of three federally recognized Aleut tribes in Sand Point. As of 2005, the tribe had 620 enrolled citizens.

== See also ==
- List of Alaska Native tribal entities
