= Qawalangin Tribe of Unalaska =

Federally recognized Alaska Native tribe

- People: Aleuts
- Headquarters: Unalaska, Alaska, US

Government
- Chief: Dennis Robinson

Tribal Council
- Qawalangin Tribal Council

Website
- qawalangin.com

The Qawalangin Tribe of Unalaska is a federally recognized Aleut Alaska Native tribal entity.

== About ==
The Qawalanguin Tribe is headquartered in the city of Unalaska on Unalaska Island of the Aleutians West Census Area. As of 2005, the tribe had 539 enrolled citizens.

== See also ==
- List of Alaska Native tribal entities
