= Hoonah Indian Association =

Alaska Native tribe

Hoonah Indian Association X̱úna (Tlingit)
- Alaska Native village
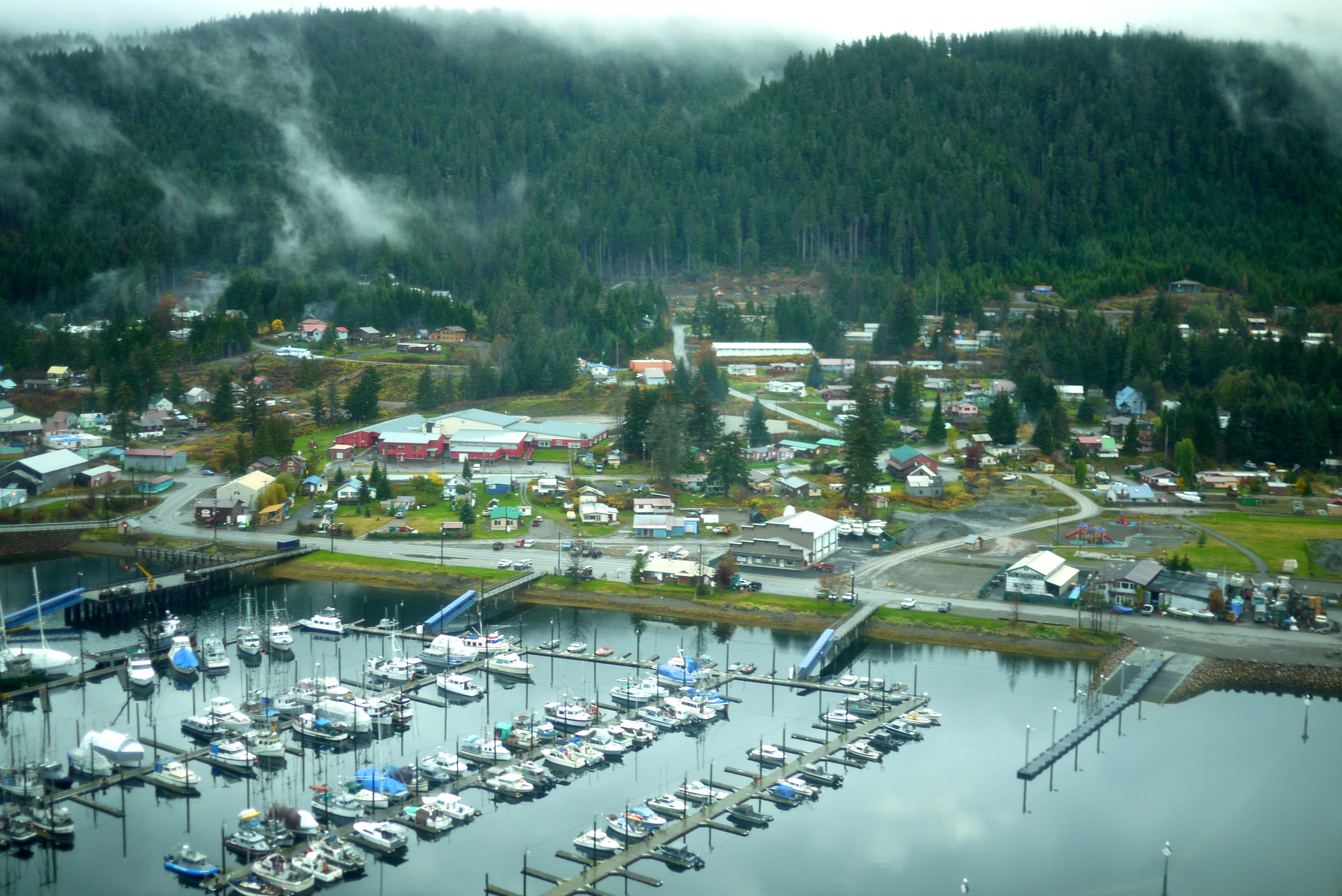
- Aerial photo of Hoonah, Alaska

- Hoonah Indian Association headquarters
- Coordinates: 58°6′36″N 135°26′39″W
- Constitution Ratified: October 23, 1939; 86 years ago
- Capital: Hoonah

Government
  - Type: Representative democracy
  - Body: Hoonah Indian Association Board
  - Board President: Frank Wright, Jr.
  - Board Vice President: Lily Hughes
- Demonym: Tlingit
- Time zone: UTC– 09:00 (AKST)
  - Summer (DST): UTC– 08:00 (AKDT)
- Website: www.craigtribe.org

The Hoonah Indian Association is a federally recognized Tlingit Native American tribe in the United States.. This Alaska Native tribe is headquartered in Hoonah, Alaska..

== Government ==
The tribe is government by a democratically elected tribal board. The board president is Frank Wright Jr.

The Hoonah Indian Association ratified their constitution and by-laws in 1939. The Hoonah Indian Association is the federally recognized tribal government for the Tlingit people of Hoonah, exercising governmental authority and providing services to its tribal citizens. Also serving tribal citizens is the Huna Totem Corporation, the Alaska Native Village Corporation established under the Alaska Native Claims Settlement Act (ANCSA) to manage land, economic development, and shareholder interests. At the regional level, Hoonah tribal citizens and Huna Totem shareholders are also part of Sealaska Corporation, the ANCSA‑created Alaska Native Regional Corporation for Southeast Alaska. Although the three entities serve overlapping populations, they operate independently: the Hoonah Indian Association functions as a sovereign tribal government, Huna Totem Corporation manages village‑level corporate assets, and Sealaska oversees regional lands and economic programs for its shareholders.

== Services ==
The tribe provides programs, meals, information, and transportation for their elders.

The Hoonah Indian Association’s Department of Human Services administers several programs that support the safety and well‑being of tribal citizens, including services related to the Indian Child Welfare Act (ICWA), advocacy and assistance for individuals affected by domestic violence or sexual assault, and support for crime victims navigating recovery and available resources.

== Environmental Programs ==
The Hoonah Indian Association administers a broad range of environmental programs focused on protecting local ecosystems, supporting community stewardship, and strengthening long‑term resilience in the face of environmental change. A central component of this work is the Tribe’s Climate Adaptation Plan, a community‑driven document that identifies observed environmental changes, outlines anticipated impacts on local resources and lifeways, and proposes strategies to help Hoonah prepare for shifting conditions.

=== Major Program Areas ===
- Climate Adaptation Planning – Development and implementation of a community‑driven Climate Adaptation Plan that evaluates environmental risks and outlines strategies for resilience and adaptation.
- IGAP (Indian General Assistance Program) – Environmental protection activities including solid waste management, environmental education, community outreach, and coordination of local environmental priorities.
- Shellfish and Marine Monitoring – Long‑term monitoring of shellfish populations, harmful algal blooms, and marine conditions to support safe subsistence harvesting and understand ecological trends.
- Fisheries and Ocean Science Programs – Research and monitoring related to salmon, halibut, herring, marine mammals, and other culturally important species, often in partnership with regional and federal agencies.
- Forestry and Vegetation Monitoring – Projects focused on forest health, invasive species, wild berries, and vegetation changes, supporting both ecological understanding and traditional resource use.
- Cultural and Subsistence Resource Documentation – Documentation of cultural resources, traditional foods, seaweeds, and other subsistence practices to support intergenerational knowledge and community well‑being.
- Youth Engagement and Workforce Development – Programs such as AmeriCorps, AYS/TRAYLS, and youth science initiatives that involve young people in environmental stewardship, monitoring, and cultural education.
- Community Garden and Food Security Initiatives – Projects like the Hoonah Community Potato Garden that support local food production, traditional foods, and community resilience.

== See also ==
- List of Alaska Native tribal entities
