= Native Village of Larsen Bay =

Alaska Native village

- People: Alutiiq
- Headquarters: Larsen Bay, Alaska, US

Government
- Chief: Richard Henson

The Native Village of Larsen Bay is a federally recognized Alutiiq Alaska Native tribal entity.

== History ==
Native Village of Larsen Bay is headquartered in the city of Larsen Bay in the Kodiak Island Borough of Alaska. As of 2005, the tribe had 479 enrolled citizens.

ProPublica has reported that 61 Native American remains and 40 funerary objects of interest to the Native Village of Larsen Bay have been repatriated to the tribe during the 1990s and early 21st century. Six remains of interest to the village have not been repatriated; three are held at the Alaska Office of History and Archeology, two at Harvard University, and one at the University of California, Berkeley. In 1994, the Smithsonian Institution published a book titled Reckoning with the Dead: The Larsen Bay Repatriation and Smithsonian Institution. The Smithsonian Museum of Natural History had repatriated remains to Larsen Bay in 1990.

== See also ==
- List of Alaska Native tribal entities
