= Native Village of Karluk =

Federally recognized Alaska Native village

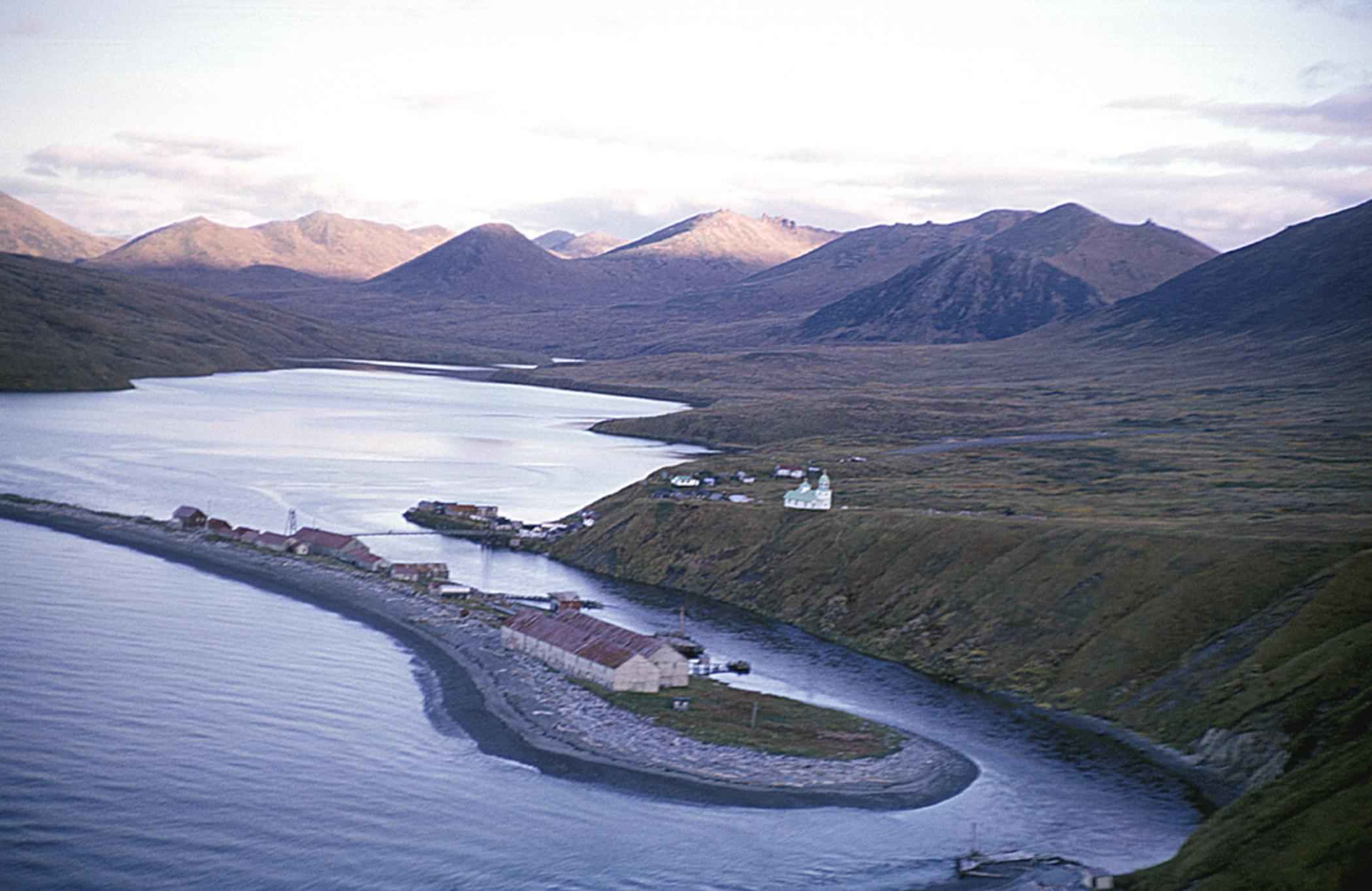
- People: Alutiiq
- Headquarters: Karluk, Alaska, US

Government
- Chief: Alicia Andrew

Tribal Council
- Karluk Tribal Council

The Native Village of Karluk is a federally recognized Alutiiq Alaska Native tribal entity.

== History ==
Native Village of Karluk is headquartered in the city of Karluk in the Kodiak Island Borough of Alaska. As of 2005, the tribe has 189 enrolled citizens.

In 2023, the Native Village of Karluk released a viral advertisement that offered to cover all expenses for any two families who agreed to move to Karluk. Thousands of people responded to the advertisement. The Karluk Tribal Council produced the advertisement due to the community's dwindling population. In 2023, only 37 people lived in Karluk.

== See also ==
- List of Alaska Native tribal entities
