= Sun'aq Tribe of Kodiak =

Federally recognized Alaska Native tribe

- Alaska Native village
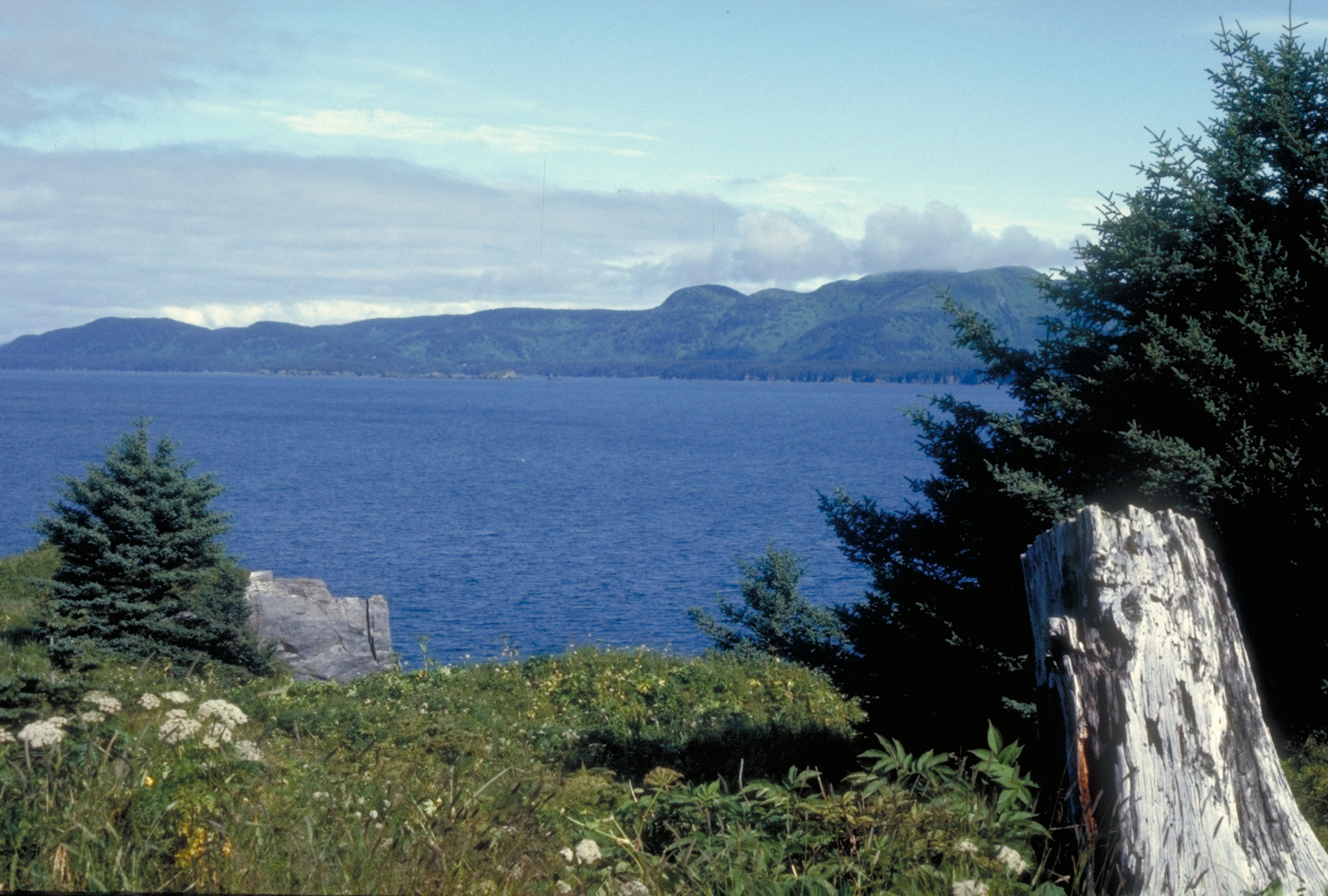
- Kodiak coast

- Location within Alaska
- Coordinates: 57°47′16″N 152°24′23″W
- Constitution Ratified: October 4, 1988; 37 years ago
- Capital: Kodiak, Alaska

Government
  - Type: Representative democracy
  - Body: Sun'aq Tribal Council
  - Chairperson: Christopher Pruitt

Population
  - Estimate: 1,738
- Demonym: Koniag Alutiiq
- Time zone: UTC–09:00 (AKST)
  - Summer (DST): UTC–08:00 (AKDT)
- Website: sunaq.org

The Sun'aq Tribe of Kodiak is a federally recognized Alaska Native tribe and one of 10 Alutiiq tribes. This Alaska Native tribe is headquartered in Kodiak, Alaska.

They were formerly known as the Shoonaq' Tribe of Kodiak.

== Government ==
The Sun'aq Tribe of Kodiak is led by a democratically elected tribal council, and its chairperson is Christopher Pruitt. JJ Marsh is the executive director of tribe. The Alaska Regional Office of the Bureau of Indian Affairs serves the tribe. The tribe ratified its constitution on October 4, 1988. Sun'aq Tribe has 1,738 enrolled citizens.

The tribe is a member of the National Congress of American Indians.

== Territory ==
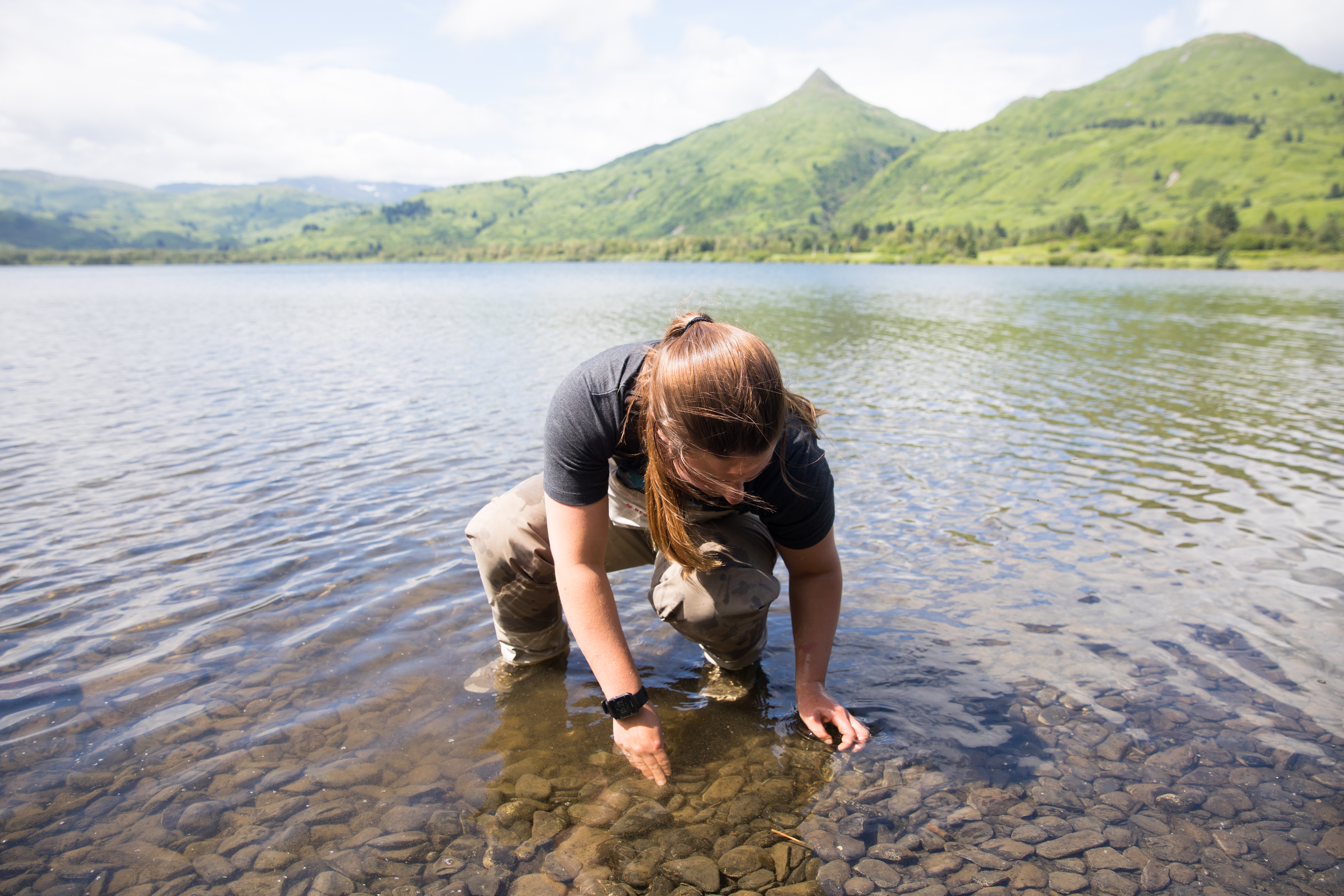
Kelly Krueger, biologist for the Sun'aq Tribe of Kodiak, monitoring the Buskin Lake

The Su'naq Tribe's land close to Kodiak, Alaska, on Kodiak Island on the Gulf of Alaska. The community is accessible by plane via Kodiak Airport and boat.

== Economy ==
Fishing and fish processing is central to the tribe's economic development, and it owns Kodiak Island WildSource. The tribe is affiliated with Koniag, Incorporated, an Alaska Native corporation.

== Language and culture ==
The Sun'aq Tribe speaks English and the Alutiiq language. They are teaching Alutiiq to children at a tribal program at St. Mary's School.

== Climate change ==
Alaska Natives are already feeling the effects of climate change from increased fires, harsher storms, melting permafrost, erosion along the coasts, and weather patterns shifting. To address these threats, in 2006, 162 Alaska Native tribes, including the Sun'aq Tribe of Kodiak, and corporations working with the Native American Rights Fund, signed a Climate Change resolution calling upon Congress to pass laws to reduce greenhouse gas emissions.

== See also ==
- USCGC Spar (WLB-206), honorary ship of the tribe
