= Native Village of Ouzinkie =

Alaska Native village

- People: Alutiiq
- Headquarters: Ouzinkie, Alaska, US

Government
- Chief: Robert Boskofsky

Tribal Council
- Ouzinkie Tribal Council

The Native Village of Ouzinkie is a federally recognized Alutiiq Alaska Native tribal entity.

== About ==
The Native Village of Ouzinkie is headquartered in the city of Ouzinkie in the Kodiak Island Borough of Alaska. As of 2005, the tribe had 381 enrolled citizens.

== See also ==
- List of Alaska Native tribal entities
