= Skagway Village =

Alaska Native tribe

Skagway Village Shg̱agwei (Tlingit)
- Alaska Native village
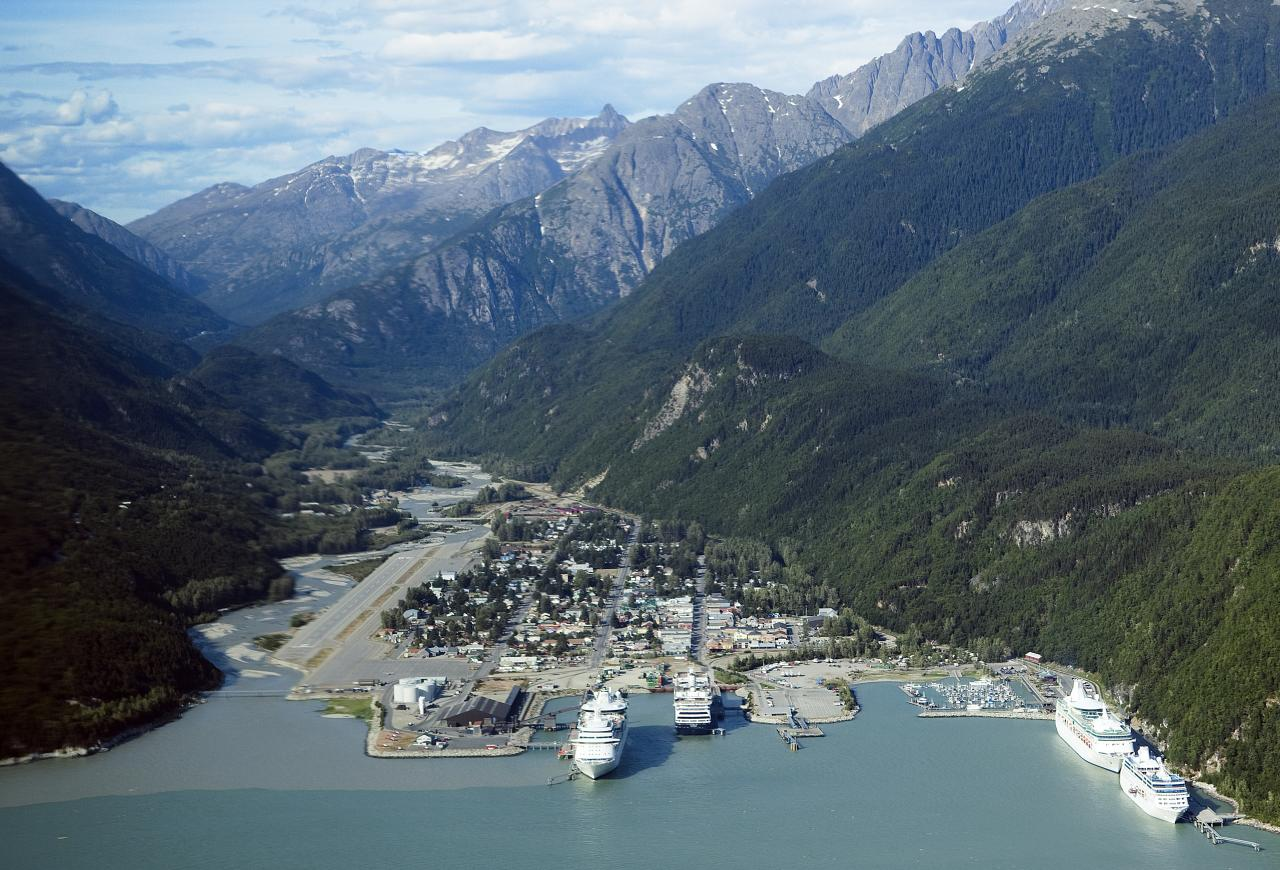
- Aerial view of Skagway

- Skagway Village
- Coordinates: 59°27′30″N 135°18′31″W
- Constitution Ratified: 1980; 46 years ago
- Capital: Skagway, Alaska

Government
  - Type: Representative democracy
  - Body: Skagway Traditional Council
  - President: Jamie Bricker

Population (2025)
  - Estimate: 57
- Demonym: Skagway Tlingit
- Time zone: UTC–09:00 (AKST)
  - Summer (DST): UTC–08:00 (AKDT)
- Website: skagwaytraditional.org

Skagway Village, also known at the Skagway Traditional Council, is a federally recognized Alaska Native tribe of Tlingit people. This Alaska Native tribe is headquartered in Skagway, Alaska, and is estimated to have 57 citizens in 2025.

They are known as the Skagway Tlingit. The Tlingit language spelling is Tlingit: Shg̱agwei, Their local healthcare is provided by the Dahl Memorial Medical Clinic, which translates as "place where the north wind blows".

== Government ==
Skagway Village is led by a democratically elected tribal council. Its president is Jamie Bricker. The Alaska Regional Office of the Bureau of Indian Affairs serves the tribe.

The tribe ratified its constitution and by-laws in 1980 and amended them in 2004, 2015, and 2021.

== Territory ==
Tlingit people have lived in present-day Skagway, located on the Alaskan Panhandle, for millennia. European-Americans entered the region in the 1880s Gold Rush. Considered the gateway to the Klondike and is near Glacier Bay National Park, Skagway sits in a valley between steap mountains on the Taiya Inlet and is northeast of Haines, Alaska. The Klondike Highway and Alaska Highway allow automobile traffic to access British Columbia.

The tribe's environmental coordinator, Reuben Cash, is leading an effort to reduce the invasive plant species, such as white sweetclover, orange hawkweed, reed canary grass, and yellow toadflax that have overrun tribal lands.

== Economy ==
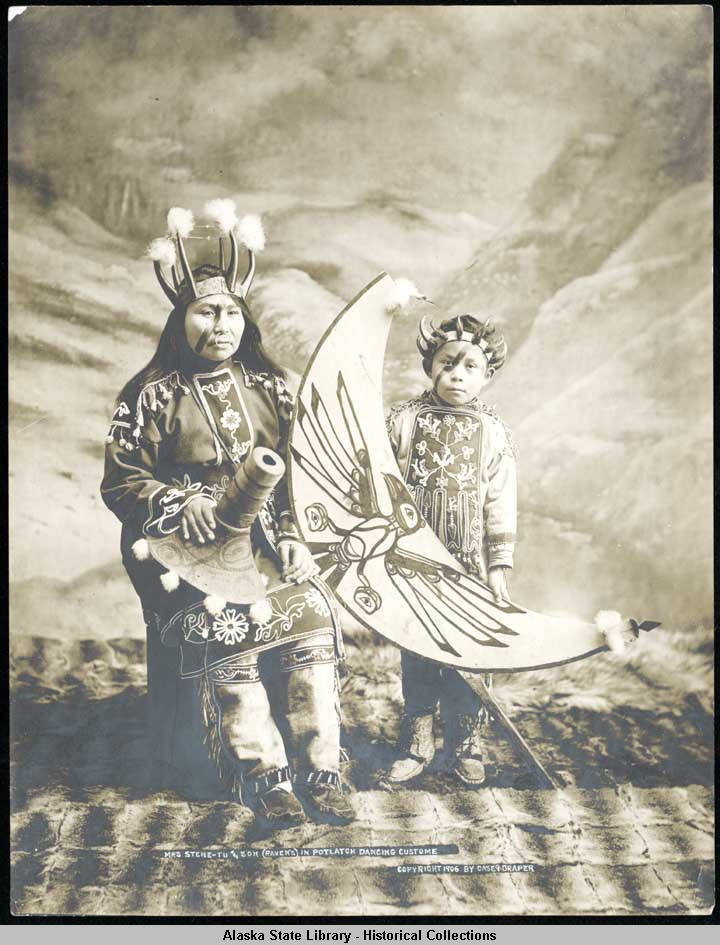
Mrs. SteneTu and her son Ravens wearing their potlatch regalia, 1906. Photo by William Howard Case and Horace H. Draper, Skagway, Alaska

Skagway Village is affiliated with Sealaska Corporation, an Alaska Native corporation.

== Communications ==
The tribe received slight more than $2 million dollars to develop broadband internet through the Tribal Broadband Connectivity Program.

== Language and culture ==
The people of Skagway Village speaks English and the Tlingit language.

== See also ==
- Culture of the Tlingit
- History of the Tlingit
