= Sitka Tribe of Alaska =

Native Alaskan tribe

- Ethnicity: Alaska Natives
- Location: Sitka, Alaska, U.S.
- Population: 4,000

The Sitka Tribe of Alaska is the federally recognized tribal government for more than 4,000 federally recognized Native people, mostly Alaska Natives from Southeast Alaska, living in or near Sitka in the U.S. state of Alaska. Most Sitka Tribe citizens of are Tlingit, Haida or Tsimshian heritage.

== History ==
The tribal government was created through the passage of the Indian Reorganization Act of 1934. It was originally called the Sitka Community Association.

In 2008, David Avraham Voluck became chief judge of the Sitka Tribal Court. He is the only non-Native tribal judge in Alaska.
