= Hydaburg Cooperative Association =

Alaska Native tribe

Hydaburg Cooperative Association Higdáa G̱ándlaay (Haida)
- Alaska Native village
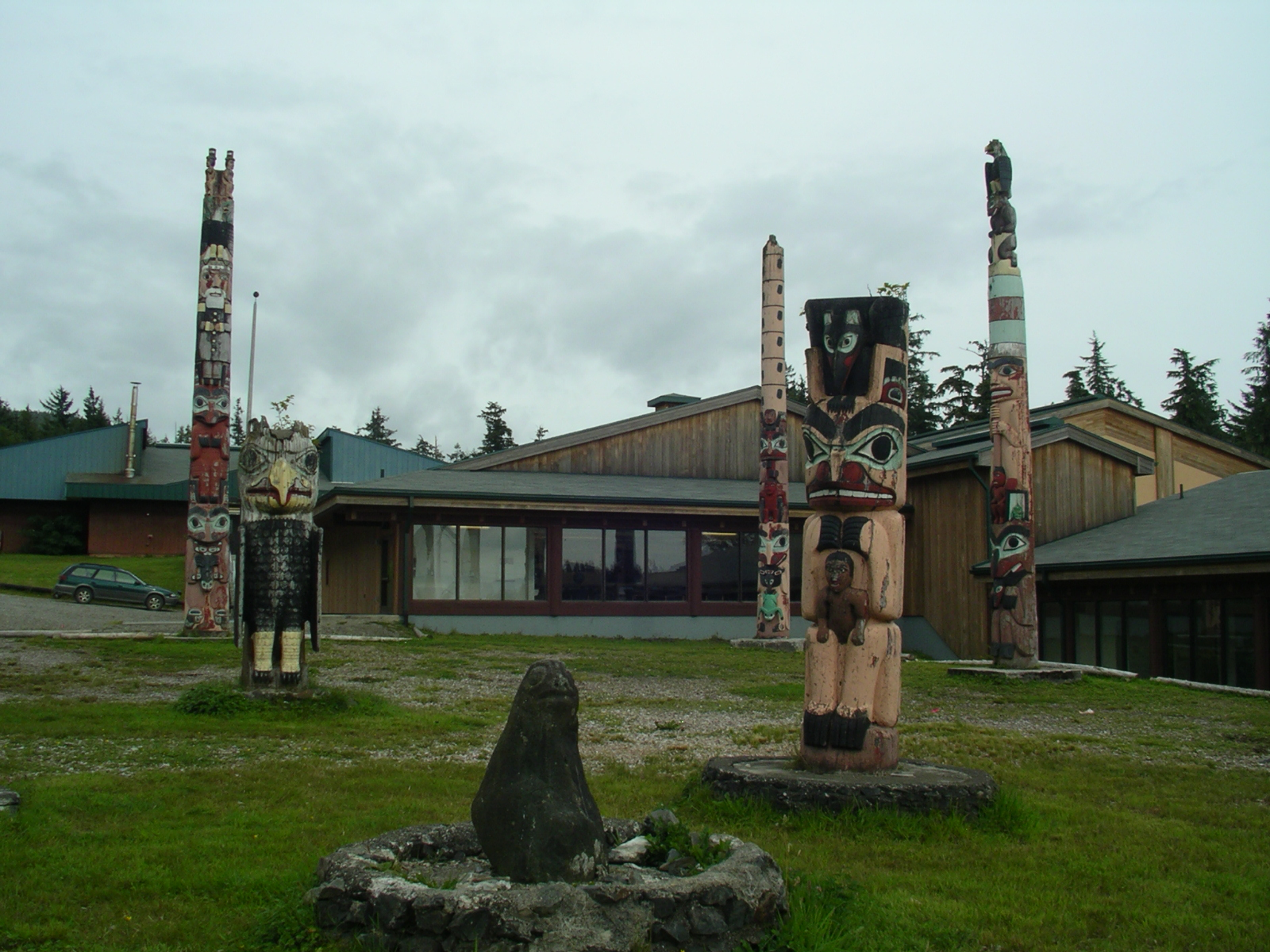
- Totem Park in Hydaburg

- Hydaburg Cooperative Association
- Coordinates: 55°12′27″N 132°49′36″W
- Constitution Ratified: April 13, 1938; 88 years ago
- Capital: Hydaburg

Government
  - Type: Representative democracy
  - Body: Hydaburg Cooperative Association Tribal Council
  - President: Sidney Edenshaw
  - Vice President: Patricia Natkong
- Demonym: Haida
- Time zone: UTC– 09:00 (AKST)
  - Summer (DST): UTC– 08:00 (AKDT)
- Website: hcatribe.org

The Hydaburg Cooperative Association is a federally recognized Haida Native American tribe in the United States.. This Alaska Native tribe is headquartered in Hydaburg, Alaska..

== Government ==
The tribe is governed by a democratically elected Tribal Council. The Council President is Sidney Edenshaw.

The Hydaburg Cooperative Association ratified their constitution and by-laws on April, 14 1938. The Hydaburg Cooperative Association is the federally recognized tribal government for the Haida people of Hydaburg, exercising governmental authority and providing services to its tribal citizens. Also serving tribal citizens is the Haida Corporation, the Alaska Native Village Corporation established under the Alaska Native Claims Settlement Act (ANCSA) to manage land, economic development, and shareholder interests. At the regional level, Hydaburg tribal citizens and Haida Corporation shareholders are also part of Sealaska Corporation, the ANCSA‑created Alaska Native Regional Corporation for Southeast Alaska. Although the three entities serve overlapping populations, they operate independently: the Hydaburg Cooperative Association functions as a sovereign tribal government, Haida Corporation manages village‑level corporate assets, and Sealaska oversees regional lands and economic programs for its shareholders.

The Hydaburg Cooperative Association represents the Kaigani Haida community in Hydaburg, Alaska, and serves as the federally recognized tribal government for Haida people in the United States. Although the Kaigani Haida share a common ancestry, culture, and identity with the Haida Nation of Haida Gwaii, the Hydaburg Cooperative Association operates under United States law and is politically distinct from the Council of the Haida Nation, the elected government of the Haida people in Canada. The Council of the Haida Nation’s mandate includes representing all Haida citizens and asserting Haida sovereignty in Canada, but it does not exercise governmental authority over the Kaigani Haida in Alaska, who maintain their own tribal government through the Hydaburg Cooperative Association.

== Services ==
The Hydaburg Cooperative Association provides a range of services to its tribal citizens, including educational support through the HCA Scholarship Program, which offers up to $2,500 per year to tribal citizens pursuing studies at accredited colleges or universities. Hydaburg Cooperative Association tribal citizens also benefit from economic and resource‑based initiatives undertaken by the Haida Corporation. Through its subsidiary Haida Energy, the corporation co‑owns and operates the Hiilangaay Hydroelectric Project, a 5‑megawatt facility placed in service in 2021 that supplies renewable power to Prince of Wales Island communities and reduces reliance on diesel generation. Haida Corporation has also developed a forest‑based carbon sequestration project on approximately 8,600 acres of old‑growth timber, resulting in the registration of more than 340,000 California Air Resources Board Offset Credits (ARBOCs), most of which were sold in 2020.

== See also ==
- List of Alaska Native tribal entities
