= Craig Tribal Association =

Alaska Native tribe

- Alaska Native village
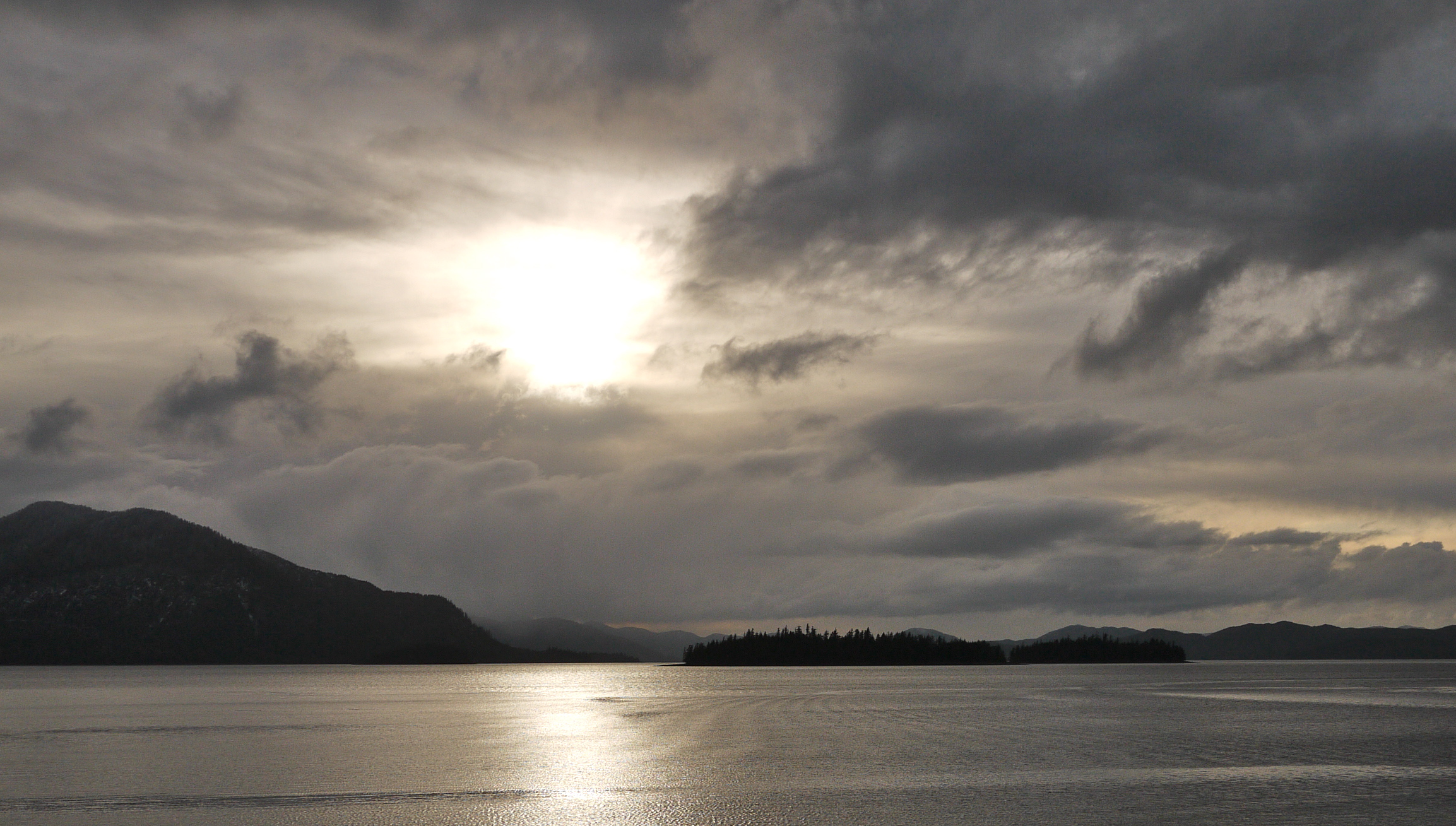
- Craig, Alaska before a storm

- Craig Tribal Association headquarters
- Coordinates: 55°28′40″N 133°9′0″W
- Constitution Ratified: October 8, 1938; 87 years ago
- Capital: Craig

Government
  - Type: Representative democracy
  - Body: Craig Tribal Council
  - President: Clinton E. Cook, Sr.
  - Vice President: Fred Hamilton, Jr.

Population (2025)
  - Estimate: >66
- Demonym: Tlingit
- Time zone: UTC– 09:00 (AKST)
  - Summer (DST): UTC– 08:00 (AKDT)
- Website: www.craigtribe.org

The Craig Tribal Association is a federally recognized Native American tribe in the United States of Tlingit people. This Alaska Native tribe is headquartered in Craig, Alaska.

The tribe was previously known as the Craig Community Association.

== Government ==
The tribe is governed by a democratically elected tribal council. Their current administration is:

- President: Clinton E. Cook Sr.
- Vice President: Fred Hamilton Jr.
- Treasurer: Kellie J. Ebbighausen
- Secretary: June E. Durgan
- Council Member: Michael Douville
- Council Member: Mary Salazar
- Council Member: A.H. Millie Schoonover

The Craig Community Association ratified their constitution and organized their corporate charter in 1938. They are served by the Alaska Regional Office of the Bureau of Indian Affairs.

== Economic developments ==
Craig Tribal Association owns the CTA Smoke and Gift Shop, Aimee's Cabins, and 420 Green Street Marijuana Dispensary all in Craig.

== Elder services ==
The tribe provides programs, meals, information, and transportation for their elders.

== Communications ==
They received $2.4 million dollars to develop broadband internet through the Tribal Broadband Connectivity Program.

== See also ==
- List of Alaska Native tribal entities
