= Pulikla Tribe of Yurok People =

Coordinates: 41°30′52″N 124°01′00″W

Location of Pulikla Tribe of Yurok People

The Pulikla Tribe of Yurok People, previously known as the Resighini Rancheria, is a federally recognized tribe of Yurok people.

On January 7, 1938, Augusta (Gus) Resighini conveyed a tract of 228 acres of land on Waukell Flat to the Government of the United States as part of an effort stated in 1937 by the Bureau of Indian Affairs’ Hoopa Agency called the contractual land acquisition project. The BIA acquired the land for a yet to be determined group of homeless and landless Indians that came to be knowns as the Resighini Rancheria when the Secretary of the Interior ordered the land “in Trust for such Indians of Del Norte and Humboldt Counties, in California, eligible to participate in the benefits of the (Indian Reorganization) Act of June 18, 1934 (48 Stat. 984) (25 U.S.C. ss 461 et seq. (1970)), as shall be designated by the Secretary of the Interior.”

== Name changes ==
The Pulikla Tribe of Yurok People was originally named the "Coast Indian Community of Yurok Indians of the Resighini Rancheria". In 1998, the Tribe changed its name to Resighini Rancheria.

In 2024, the Tribe adopted its current name, Pulikla Tribe of Yurok People, to better honor its ancestral lands and cultural identity.

"Pueleeklaa" means "downriver people" in the Yurok Language.

== Tribal government ==
The lands of the Pulikla Tribe of Yurok People were proclaimed an Indian Reservation in 1939, and the tribal government was formed in 1975 and is headquartered in Klamath, California. They are governed by a democratically elected, five-member tribal council. The general membership serves on boards, committees, commissions, and corporations to assist the tribal council.

The current Tribal Council is as follows:

- Chairperson: Fawn Che-gere Murphy
- Vice Chairperson: Moonchay Kari Dowd
- Secretary: Frank Spa-ghe Dowd
- Treasurer: Kendra Jones
- Councilmember: Kathy Dowd

In 2003, the Resighini Rancheria established a tribal court to oversee criminal offenses as well as regulatory procedures regarding fishing and wildlife.

Map of Resighini Rancheria and nearby reservations (In yellow.)

== Partition and waiver of rights ==
The Pulikla Tribe is completely enclosed within the Yurok Reservation of the Yurok Tribe since Resighini Rancheria creation in 1939 because the continued existence of the Yurok Reservation as "Indian Country" was upheld by the Supreme Court of the United States in the case of Mattz v. Arnett. In the case, State of California attempted to assert jurisdiction to regulate fishing on the Klamath River by members of the Yurok Tribe, but the Court determined that California did not have jurisdiction because the Yurok Reservation had always been "Indian Country". The Mattz ruling, and another known as the Jessie Short case, led to passage of a congressional act partitioning the Resighini Rancheria and Yurok Reservation from the Hoopa Valley Reservation

The Hoopa-Yurok Settlement Act of 1988, an acted passed by the 2nd Session of the 100th Congress of 1988, declared that Yurok descendants who have chosen to remain members of recognized tribes other than the Yurok Tribe of the Yurok Reservation - primarily the Resighini Rancheria, but also the Cher-Ae Heights Indian Community of the Trinidad Rancheria and Big Lagoon Rancheria - "shall no longer have any right or interest whatsoever in the tribal, communal, or unallotted land, property, resources, or rights within, or appertaining to, the Yurok Indian Reservation or the Yurok Tribe."

The Resighini Rancheria attempted to challenge the Hoopa-Yurok Settlement Act in 1992 case Shermoen v. United States, 982 F.2d 1312, 1314 (9th Cir. 1992), but the court ruling in the case found that "In the Hoopa-Yurok Settlement Act, Congress sought to resolve the legal conflicts by: (1) partitioning the reservation into two reservations, designating the Square as the "Hoopa Valley Reservation" and the Extension as the "Yurok Reservation," 25 U.S.C. § 1300i-1; (2) distributing the escrow funds, 25 U.S.C. § 1300i-33; (3) confirming the statutes of the Hoopa Valley Tribe, and designating the Square or Hoopa Valley Reservation as the reservation to be held in trust for the Hoopa Valley Tribe, 25 U.S.C. § 1300i-1(b) 7; (4) recognizing and organizing the Yurok Tribe, and designating the Addition or Yurok Reservation as the reservation to be held in trust for the Yurok Tribe, 25 U.S.C. § 1300i-1(c) 8." Shermoen v. U.S., 982 F.2d 1312, 1316 (9th Cir. 1992)

The Yurok Tribe claims jurisdiction over all lands within the exterior boundaries of the Yurok Reservation except those within the exterior boundaries of the Resighini Rancheria because the Hoopa-Yurok Settlement Act defined the "Yurok Reservation" in section 2(c) as "the area of land known as the "extension" (defined as the reservation extension under the Executive Order of October 16, 1891, but excluding the Resighini Rancheria) shall thereafter be recognized and established as the Yurok Reservation" and the "Yurok Tribe" as in section 9 as "Those persons on the Settlement Roll who made a valid election pursuant to subsection (c) of section 6 shall constitute the base membership roll for the Yurok Tribe whose status as an Indian tribe, subject to the adoption of the Interim Council resolution."

== Cultural life ==
Pulikla tribal members participate in traditional dances, such as the Brush Dance, as well as the Jump Dance and White Deer Skin Dance.

The Brush Dance is a ceremony held to heal a sick child or to pray for a long, healthy life for the child. Families come together around a dance pit, beginning on a Wednesday, where the medicine doctor, the child, and the child's family begin. Actual dancing begins on Thursday evening with two dances. Both men and women dance.

The Jump Dance, revived in 1984, lasts for 10 days. The dance is held to prevent sickness, to bring happiness, and to restore balance in the universe. The dancers wear elaborate outfits, including headdresses with 70 redheaded woodpecker scalps. In addition to the headdress, the dancers also wear dentalia shell necklaces and a deerskin skirt, and they carry a Jump Dance basket in the right hand.

The White Deerskin Dance is generally held around the same time as the Jump Dance. Canoes are used to transport dancers. It seems dancers carry poles with deer heads draped by deerskins. This dance provides protection to the people. This dance was also recently revived.

Tribal members also engage in traditional storytelling and traditions of gathering seaweed, mussels, and other marine resources for basket making and subsistence fishing for salmon, trout, eel, and other species.

== Fishing controversy ==
Fishing conflicts have arisen with the Yurok Tribe of the Yurok Reservation, the largest in California with 6,311 members, because the partition and release of rights signed by the Hoopa-Yurok Settlement Act divided lands into the Yurok and the Hoopa reservations. The Pulikla Tribe was offered the option of joining the Yurok Tribe to have access to Yurok lands and fishing. Instead, the tribal members opted for a payout of $15,000 per person. The Yurok Tribe argues that the Pulikla gave up their fishing rights when they made this agreement. The Pulikla members argue that they retained their fishing rights and that the Yurok Tribe are unjustly interfering with their land and water use. The Yurok Tribe further argue that they are in the midst of a massive conservation effort, and the Pulikla are interfering in their attempts to save the fish in the Klamath River.

== Population ==
A resident population of 36 persons was reported during the 2000 census. The 2020 US Census showed a slight increase, with a population of 39.

== Education ==
The ranchería is served by the Del Norte County Unified School District.
