= Big Lagoon =

Big Lagoon may refer to:

- Big Lagoon (California), an enclosed bay on the Pacific coast of California
- Big Lagoon, California, a community adjacent to the bay
- Big Lagoon Rancheria, in California
- Big Lagoon State Park, in Florida
- Big Lagoon (New Zealand), at the mouth of the Wairau River
