= Susan Masten =

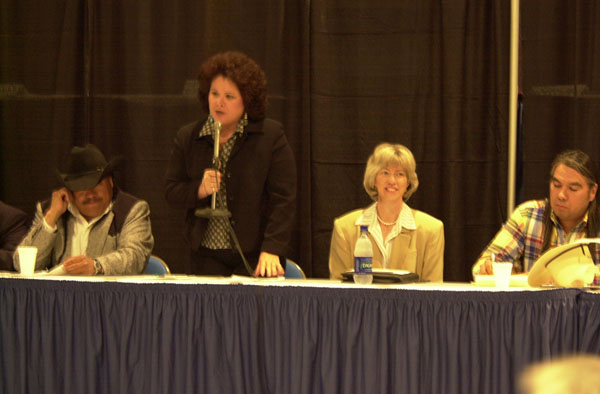
- Susan Masten, standing, with Secretary Gale Norton (right of Masten) and Three Affiliated Tribes Chairman Tex Hall (right of Norton)

Yurok Tribal Chairperson
- In office 1997–2004

Personal details
- Born: 1952 (age 73–74) Crescent City, California, U.S.
- Relatives: Amy Bowers Cordalis (niece); Raymond Mattz (uncle)

Susan Masten (born 1952) of Northern California is a leader with the Yurok tribe and the past Yurok Tribal Chairperson. She is a political activist involved with many tribal and women's issues.

== Early life ==
Masten was born in Crescent City, California and lived in Requa as a young child. She moved away from Del Norte County as a fourth-grader but continued to visit her grandparents at their homes in Requa and near Brook's Riffle.

Masten graduated from Oregon State University. During her years as a student, she was elected as one of the first presidents of the university's Native American Student Association.

== Activism ==
With a group of Yurok fishermen, Masten founded an organization to influence fishing regulations on the Klamath River. This work had built onto her uncle Raymond Mattz's victory before the U.S. Supreme Court in Mattz v. Arnett.

Masten served as President of the National Congress of American Indians (NCAI) from 1999 to 2001. She is the second women ever elected president. Masten describes the relationship she wishes to have with governors, "As responsible governments, we want to sit at the table and develop cooperative relationships where states and tribes can work together for the growth and development of Indian communities and all of our neighboring communities".

Masten served as Yurok tribal chairperson from 1997 to 2004.

Masten testified before Congress. She also has presented many speeches and often leads workshops at college and professional events. She discusses topics on Tribal Sovereignty, Trust Fund Management, Consultation, Resource Management, Co-Management and Environmental Justice.

Masten co-founded and became co-president of Women Empowering Women for Indigenous Nations (WEWIN) in 2004.

Masten is a former Chair of the Board of Directors for the Indian Law Resource Center.

== Awards ==
Masten was a finalist for the 2003 Ecotrust Indigenous Leadership Award, which "honors Native leaders of merit in the fields of conservation and community development. Ecotrust honored Masten "for her work advocating the legal and human rights of indigenous communities on a local, state and national level."

Masten was also selected as an "Outstanding Young Woman of America," Humboldt County's "Outstanding Citizen", and Del Norte County's "Young Woman of the Year".
