= Hoopa–Yurok Settlement Act =

1988 US law concerning reservation lands

Hoopa-Yurok Settlement Act
- Long title: An Act to partition certain reservation lands between the Hoopa Valley Tribe and Yurok Indians, to clarify the use of tribal timber proceeds, and for other purposes.

Citations
- Public law: 100-580
- Statutes at Large: 102 Stat. 2924

Codification
- Titles amended: 25 U.S.C.: Indians
- U.S.C. sections created: 25 U.S.C. ch. 14, subch. LXXX § 1300i et seq.

Legislative history
- Introduced in the Senate as S. 2723 by Alan M. Cranston (D-CA) on August 10, 1988; Committee consideration by Senate Committee on Indian Affairs; Passed the Senate on October 1, 1988 (Passed); Passed the House on October 4, 1988 (Passed, 360-57); Signed into law by President Ronald Reagan on October 31, 1988

The Hoopa-Yurok Settlement Act (Public Law 100-580) authorized the Secretary of the Interior to partition the area of land known as the "extension" from the Hoopa Valley Tribe Reservation, formally separating the lands and assets between the newly established Yurok Tribe and the existing Hoopa Valley Tribe. The Act provided a framework for individual Native Americans to choose between enrolling with the Yurok Tribe, Hoopa Valley Tribe, or remaining with their existing federally recognized tribe (Pulikla Tribe of Yurok People, Cher-Ae Heights Indian Community of the Trinidad Rancheria and Big Lagoon Rancheria). It also facilitated the distribution of settlement funds, addressed land and resource management, and outlined procedures for resolving legal claims related to the partition.

== History ==
The Hoopa-Yurok Settlement Act was enacted to resolve disputes over land, governance, and financial resources between individuals of Hoopa and Yurok ancestry living on the Hoopa Valley Tribe's reservation.

The roots of these disputes trace back to 1864, when Congress passed the Act of April 8, 1864 (13 Stat. 39), reducing the number of Indian reservations in California to just four. One of these reservations was the Hoopa Valley Reservation, established along the Trinity River in Northern California. The federal government forcibly relocated Indigenous peoples of various tribal backgrounds to the reservation, including those of Yurok ancestry.

In 1891, President Benjamin Harrison issued an Executive Order extending the Hoopa Valley Reservation by adding a one-mile-wide corridor on both sides of the Klamath River, stretching from the reservation’s western boundary to the Pacific Ocean. This newly designated land, known as the "extension," was home primarily to Yurok people. The combination of the original Hoopa Valley Reservation and the extension became known as the "joint reservation."

Over time, the Hoopa Valley Tribal Council controlled significant timber revenues generated from lands within the joint reservation. However, Yurok residents living in the extension argued that they were entitled to a share of these financial resources. This led to years of litigation, culminating in the Jessie Short Case, with Yurok plaintiffs suing for their rights to a portion of the timber funds.

== Implementation ==
By the late 20th century, Congress intervened to settle the ongoing conflict. In 1988 Congress passed the Hoopa-Yurok Settlement Act to resolve the conflict and ensure that individuals living on the reservation received their fair share of timber revenue benefits. Under the provisions of the Act, individual Indians on the reservation had to make one of three choices. They could choose to join the newly created Yurok Tribe, or they could join the Hoopa Valley Tribe. Those who did not want to join either tribe had the option to remain enrolled in their existing tribes, or remain unenrolled.

The financial compensation associated with these choices was a key aspect of the Act. For those who chose to join the Hoopa Valley Tribe or the Yurok Tribe, individuals under the age of 50 received $5,000, while those aged 50 or older were awarded $7,500. Individuals who opted to remain enrolled in their existing tribes or remained unenrolled received a higher payment of $15,000. These payments were made as part of the federal government’s efforts to fulfill its obligations under the Jesse Short case, which mandated that the individuals on the reservation be entitled to a share of the proceeds from timber sales. Importantly, the payments were not tied to an individual’s tribal status or a termination of rights, but were intended to meet the financial obligations set forth in the Jesse Short case.

The Hoopa-Yurok Settlement Act ultimately served to resolve the financial disputes between the two tribes by clarifying the distribution of timber revenues. It provided individuals with the financial compensation they were owed under the Jesse Short case while also offering a path for them to affiliate with one of the two tribes or remain with their existing tribal affiliations. The Hoopa-Yurok Settlement Act was not an act of termination of tribal rights, but rather a federal attempt to address the long-standing issues of resource distribution and ensure that the individuals residing on the reservation received the benefits they were entitled to.
