= Stone Lagoon =

Lagoon in Humboldt County, California

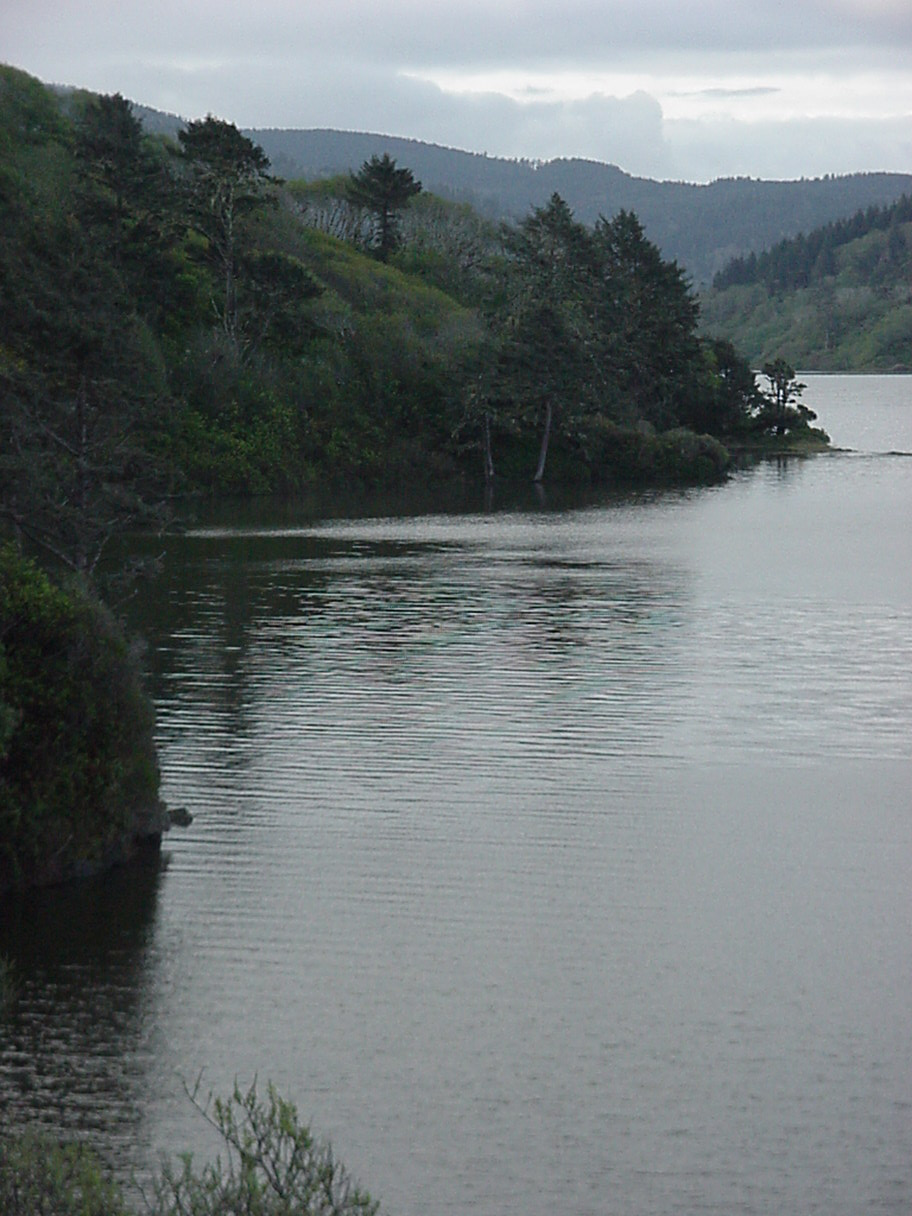
- Stone Lagoon viewed from the north

- Location within California
- Location: Humboldt County, California
- Coordinates: 41°14′37″N 124°05′40″W
- Type: lagoon
- Primary inflows: McDonald Creek
- Primary outflows: Pacific Ocean
- Basin countries: United States
- Max. length: 2.0 mi (3 km)
- Max. width: 0.7 mi (1 km)
- Surface elevation: sea level

Stone Lagoon (Yurok language: Chah-pekw O'Ket-toh) is the second of three similar lagoons within Humboldt Lagoons State Park, along the coast of Humboldt County, California.

It is located between Trinidad to the south and Orick at the mouth of Redwood Creek to the north.

The lagoons are shallow bays between rocky headlands where coastal wave action has formed a sandy bar separating each lagoon from the Pacific Ocean. The lagoons are resting areas for migratory waterfowl using the Pacific Flyway between Lake Earl on the Smith River estuarine wetlands 40 miles (64 km) to the north and Humboldt Bay on the Mad River estuarine wetlands 30 miles (48 km) to the south.

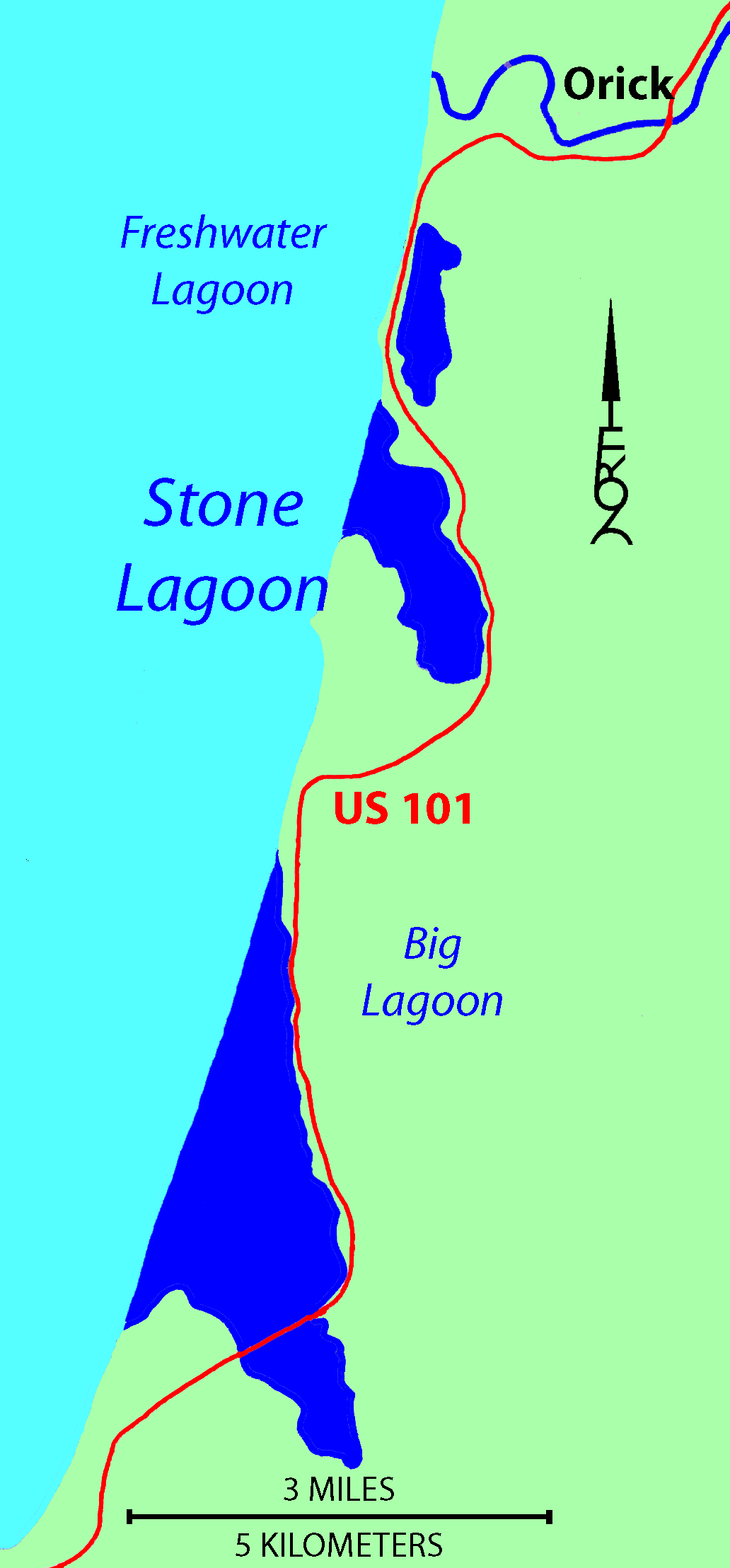

== Geology ==
Stone Lagoon is similar to other coastal features of northern California including Humboldt Bay to the south and Lake Earl to the north. An alluvial plain is surrounded by steep uplands. Hills adjacent to Stone Lagoon have been identified as undivided pre-Cretaceous metasedimentary rock. Studies around Humboldt Bay indicate tectonic activity along the Cascadia subduction zone has caused local sea level changes at intervals of several centuries. The plain may support fresh water wetlands or Sitka Spruce forests following uplift events and salt marsh or inundated shellfish beds following subsidence events. At the present lagoon level, the sand bar normally separates the lagoon from the ocean during summer months. Winter precipitation may raise the water level in the lagoon a few meters above sea level. Hydrostatic pressure and storm surf may then breach the sand bar allowing the lagoon to drain into the sea and then receive tidal inflow until wave action reforms the bar.

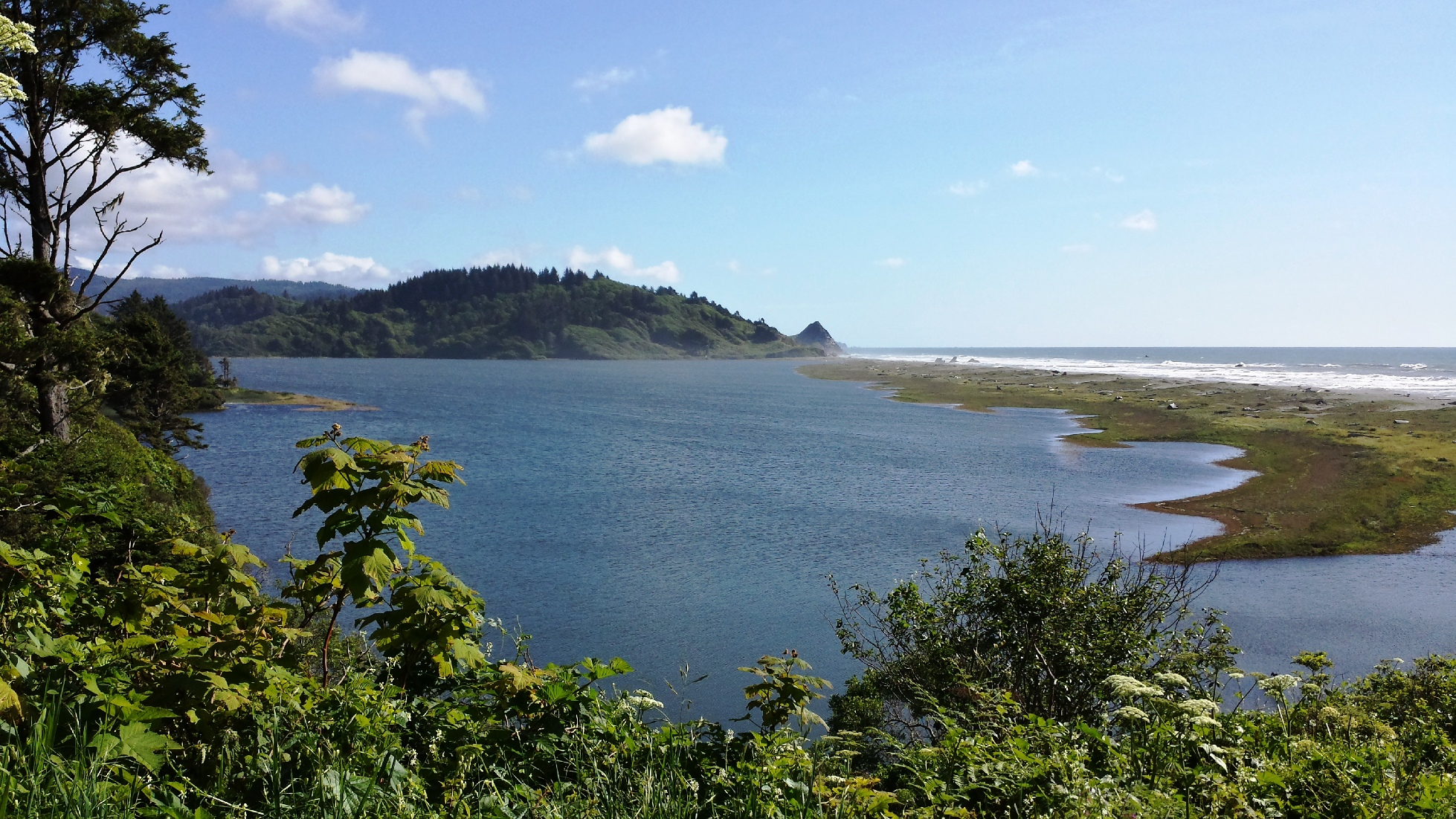
Stone Lagoon. Viewed from the road to Stone Lagoon Beach, to the North of the Lagoon

== History ==
The lagoon was known by the indigenous Yurok as Chah-pekw O'Ket-toh. It supplied fish and ducks for a Yurok village which was situated there. The Redwood Highway was completed adjacent to the lagoon about 1920. A restaurant, service station, and motor lodge were built between the highway and the lagoon in 1927. The restaurant became a visitor center for Humboldt Lagoons State Park in 1983. The Yurok Tribe operates the visitor center under a joint-powers agreement between the Tribe and California State Parks.

== Recreation ==
Roosevelt elk graze the wetlands south of the lagoon and may often be seen from U.S. Route 101. Stone lagoon is nearly completely enclosed by Humboldt Lagoons State Park. Pacific coast beaches may be accessed from a side road to the Dry Lagoon day-use area south of Stone Lagoon. Canoe access to the south end of Stone Lagoon is available adjacent to highway 101.

== See also ==
- Freshwater Lagoon
- Big Lagoon (California)
