= Amy Bowers Cordalis =

Yurok attorney and conservationist from California

- Born: Amy Bowers; 1980 (age 45–46)
- Citizenship: United States, Yurok Nation
- Education: University of Oregon (BS); University of Denver (JD)
- Occupations: Lawyer, fisherwoman, conservationist
- Political party: Democratic
- Movement: Un-Dam the Klamath
- Spouse: Daniel Cordalis
- Children: 3
- Relatives: Raymond Mattz (granduncle); Susan Masten (aunt)

Amy Bowers Cordalis (born 1980) is a Native American attorney and citizen of the Yurok Tribe, fisherwoman, Native American civil rights activist, and conservationist, who served as general counsel for the Yurok Tribe. In response to the 2002 Klamath River fish kill, she became a key figure in the Un-Dam the Klamath movement, which resulted in the successful removal of the Klamath River Hydroelectric Project dams.

== Early life and education ==
In 2003, Cordalis graduated from the University of Oregon with a Bachelor of Science in Political Science, minoring in Environmental Studies.

In 2007, Cordalis graduated with a Juris Doctor from the Sturm College of Law at the University of Denver.

== Personal life ==
Cordalis is married to a Native American Rights Fund lawyer, Daniel Cordalis (Diné). They have three sons.

== Honors ==
- Time 100 Climate (2024)
- United Nations Environment Programme Champion of the Earth (2024)

== Bibliography ==
- Cordalis, Amy Bowers (2025). "The Water Remembers: My Indigenous Family's Fight to Save a River and a Way of Life". Hachette Book Group. New York: Little, Brown and Company. ISBN 978-0-316-56895-1. Archived from the original on 2025-01-15. "For the Yurok, water is family. The river is our relative. We live in balance with the natural world, and our right to fish is essential to our identity."
