= Coyote Park =

American artist (born 1999)

Coyote Park (born 1999) is an American multidisciplinary artist, who resides in Los Angeles, California. He utilizes many forms of art, including photography, painting, and filmmaking. He is known for his trans and queer portraiture.

== Early life and education ==
Coyote Park was raised in Honolulu, Hawai'i. He is trans, identifies as two-spirit, and uses the pronouns he and they. Park is mixed race: Yurok, Korean, and German.

After graduating high school he moved to New York City, where he started photographing queer kink events, and found interest in portraiture. He graduated from Parsons School of Design with a Bachelor of Fine Arts degree in 2021 in humanities and photography.

== Career ==
Their work Kwomhlo’ochek, (translates to "I return by water") was part of the group exhibition Untouchable Artifacts: A Virtual and Printed Exhibition on Indigenous Storytelling, History, and Resilience (2021) through the Five Oaks Museum in Washington County, Oregon. This piece was made with acrylic paint on a 4 feet (1.2 m) by 2 feet (0.61 m) piece of plywood. According to the artist, it is based on a story by A.L Kroeber titled "Upriver Coyote," which is a Yurok myth about how water was brought to the tribe.

The Leslie-Lohman Museum of Art in New York City exhibited Park's work in 2021 and in 2023. In 2021, their photography was shown in a collection titled Chosen, which portrayed art depicting "queer chosen family". His debut solo exhibition was focused on his own experiences with his relationships, Coyote Park: I Love You Like Mirrors Do (2023) was held at the Leslie-Lohman Museum of Art and curated by Stamatina Gregory. This was a part of the museum's series to show works from queer artists called "Interventions".

Park's piece Divinely Protected was showcased the three-person exhibition, Your Body Changes Everything (2023) at the Finnish Museum of Photography in Helsinki, which focused on trans and queer lives and stories.

Park's photography was a part the University of Southern California's Roski School of Art and Design group exhibition titled, Wayward Refusals (2023), which sought to bring together art pieces that represented minority experiences, and Park's art focused on the queer community.

His solo exhibit, My Own Private Rodeo (2023) was on display at the West Hollywood Pride Arts Festival. The exhibit explored the question "What does it mean to exist in a way that our elders weren’t allowed to?," and included various photographs and videos as well as a performance by Park.

Park’s self-portrait photography was a part of the touring group exhibition, Body Freedom for Every(Body) (2024–2025). This cross-country mobile exhibition was hosted by Project for Empty Space and curated by Jasmine Wahl and Rebecca Pauline Jampol, it explored issues related to bodily autonomy in the United States.
