= Freshwater Lagoon =

Lagoon in Humboldt County, California

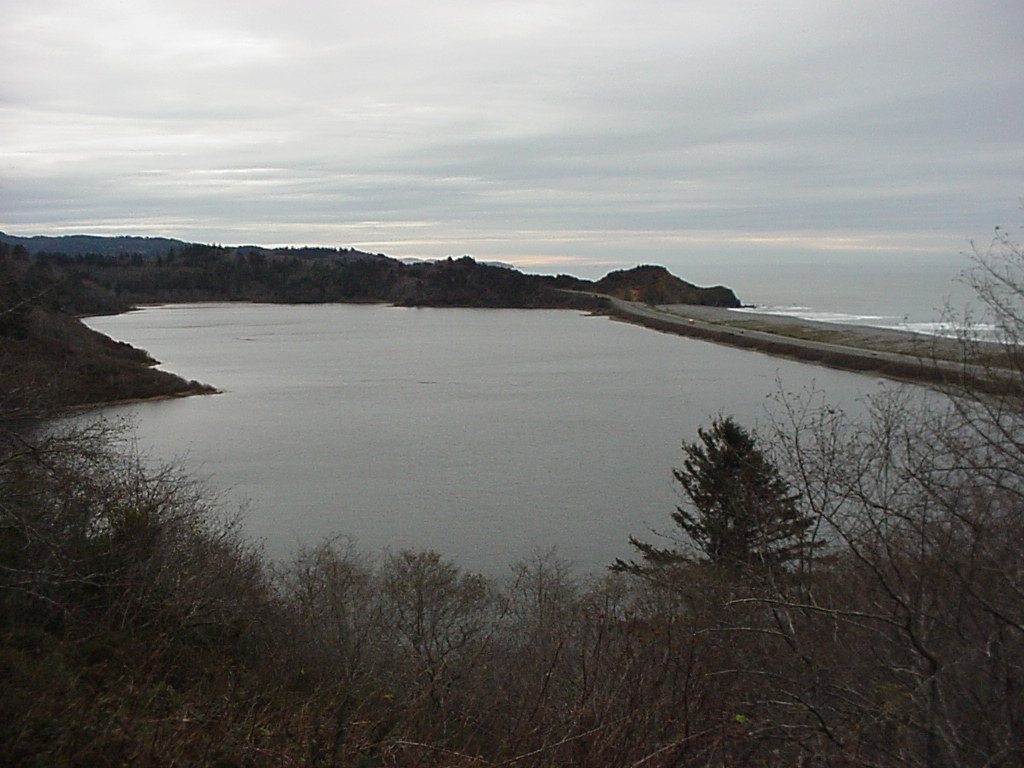
- Freshwater Lagoon viewed from the north.

- Location within California
- Location: Humboldt County, California
- Coordinates: 41°16′00″N 124°06′00″W
- Type: lagoon
- Primary outflows: Pacific Ocean
- Catchment area: 2 sq mi (10 km^{2}).
- Basin countries: United States
- Max. length: 1.3 mi (2 km)
- Max. width: 0.3 mi (0 km)
- Surface elevation: sea level

Freshwater Lagoon (Yurok: Perwerw 'O Ket'ue'hl) is the northernmost and smallest of three similar lagoons within Humboldt Lagoons State Park, along the coast of Humboldt County, California, United States.

== Geography ==
It is located between Trinidad to the south and Orick at the mouth of Redwood Creek to the north.

The lagoons are shallow bays between rocky headlands where coastal wave action has formed a sandy bar separating each lagoon from the Pacific Ocean. The lagoons are resting areas for migratory waterfowl using the Pacific Flyway between Lake Earl on the Smith River estuarine wetlands, which is 40 mi (64 km) to the north, and Humboldt Bay on the Mad River estuarine wetlands, which is 30 mi (48 km) to the south.

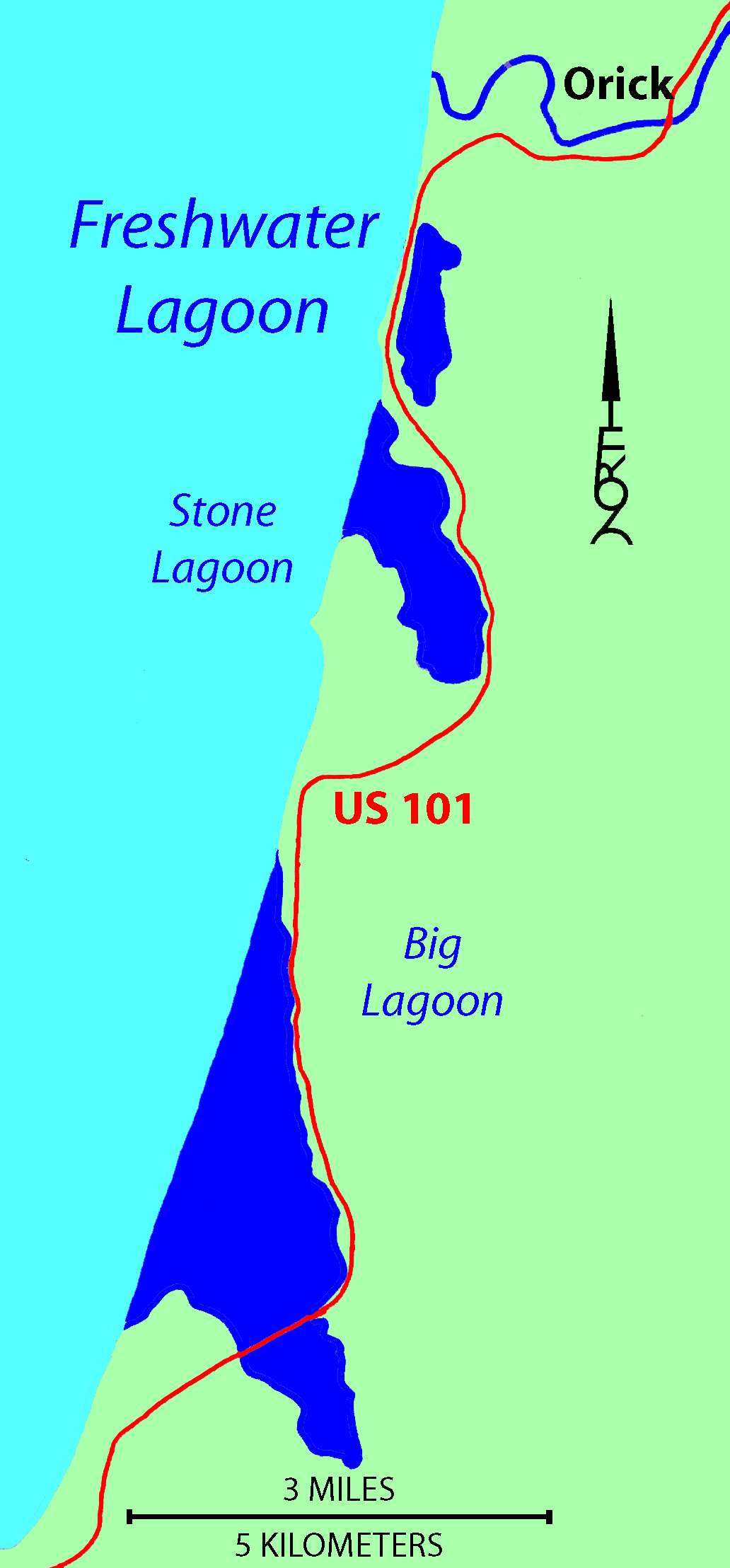

== Geology ==
Freshwater Lagoon is similar to other coastal features of northern California including Humboldt Bay to the south and Lake Earl to the north. An alluvial plain is surrounded by steep uplands. Hills adjacent to Freshwater Lagoon have been identified as undivided pre-Cretaceous metasedimentary rock. Studies around Humboldt Bay indicate tectonic activity along the Cascadia subduction zone has caused local sea level changes at intervals of several centuries. The plain may support fresh water wetlands or Sitka Spruce forests following uplift events and salt marsh or inundated shellfish beds following subsidence events. The relatively small catchment basin tributary to Freshwater Lagoon has allowed formation of a durable coastal sand bar which has not been breached by recent storm events. Precipitation usually percolates through the bar without forming a surface channel.

== Recreation ==
U.S. Route 101 traverses the coastal sand bar between Freshwater Lagoon and the Pacific Ocean. Convenient parking on the sand bar adjacent to the highway has made the lagoon a popular scenic rest area for motorists in Humboldt Lagoons State Park. There is also a Redwood National and State Parks visitor center near the north end of the lagoon.

== See also ==
- Big Lagoon (California)
- Stone Lagoon
