= Tex G. Hall =

Native American politician from North Dakota

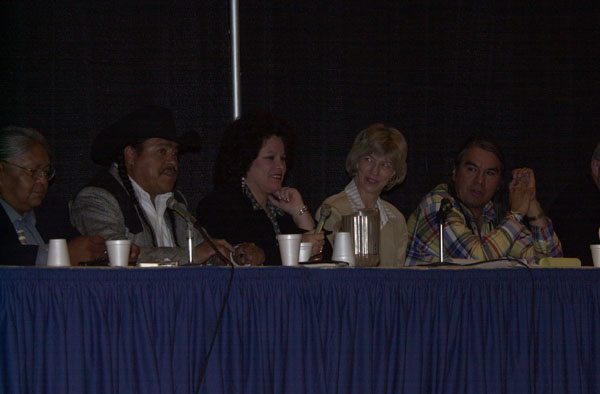
- Tex Hall, Secretary Gale Norton, and Yurok Tribe Chairwoman Susan Masten
- Born: September 18, 1956 (age 70)
- Citizenship: Three Affiliated Tribes of the Fort Berthold Reservation and U.S.
- Education: University of Mary

Tex G. Hall ("Ihbudah Hishi" "Red Tipped Arrow"), (born 18 September 1956) is a Native American who was tribal chairman of Three Affiliated Tribes from 1998 to 2006. He lost the 2006 election to Marcus Levings, but in the 2010 tribal election, Hall defeated Levings. He ran for the position of President of the National Congress of American Indians in 2001 and won his campaign at the annual convention in Spokane, Washington over Chairman Brian Wallance of the Washoe Tribe of Nevada. Hall was reelected in 2003 at the annual convention in Albuquerque, New Mexico over Ernie Stensgar, the Chairman of the Coeur d'Alene Tribe of Idaho.

== Early life and education ==
Tex Hall grew up on his family's ranch in Mandaree, North Dakota where he still ranches cattle. He has served as Chairman of the Inter Tribal Economic Alliance.

Hall earned his master's degree in education from the University of Mary in North Dakota.

== Tribal leadership ==
The Fort Berthold Reservation was well-positioned when the application of hydraulic fracturing and directional drilling technologies caused a boom in oil production from the Bakken shale formation beginning around the year 2000. As chairmen at the time, Hall became active in the oil boom on his reservation. As of 2010, he was "President of the Fort Berthold Allottee Land & Mineral Owners' Association, owner of Maheshu Energy, LLC, Red Tipped Arrow, LLC, Red Arrow Homes & Development, LLC and Tex Hall Ranch." In March 2012 he testified in Congress in opposition to proposed regulations about fracking.

As Tribal Chairman, he has traveled frequently to Denver to meet with EPA officials for approval of a refinery for oil extracted from the Bakken formation. Plans for refinery construction on the Fort Berthold Reservation received Department of the Interior approval in October 2012.

== Advocacy ==
Hall has had an ongoing interest in energy issues. A 2004 interview with Hall on the US Department of Energy "Wind Powering America" page gives extensive description of the wind power resources on tribal lands.

== Awards and honors ==
In 1995 Hall was named North Dakota Indian Educator of the Year. Hall has been inducted into the North Dakota Amateur Basketball Hall of Fame, the National Indian Athletic Association Hall of Fame, and the Minot State University Bottineau Athletic Hall of Fame. He is also a many-time all tournament team member of the SIT tournament and is the current record holder for most jab-steps in an SIT game (31).
