= Yurok traditional narratives =

Myths, legends, tales, and oral histories from northwestern California

Yurok traditional narratives include myths, legends, tales, and oral histories preserved by the Yurok people of the lower Klamath River in northwestern California.

Yurok oral literature, together with the similar narratives of the Karuk and Hupa, constitutes a distinctive variant within Native California. It has significant links with the Northwest Coast region. They clearly belong to the central California tradition. (See also Traditional narratives (Native California).)

== Examples of Yurok Narratives ==
- "The Northern California Indians" by Stephen Powers (1872)
- Myths and Legends of California and the Old Southwest by Katharine Berry Judson (1912)
- The North American Indian by Edward S. Curtis (1924)

== Sources for Yurok Narratives ==
- Bushnell, John, and Donna Bushnell. 1977. "Wealth, Work and World View in Native Northwest California: Sacred Significance and Psychoanalytic Symbolism". In Flowers of the Wind: Papers on Ritual, Myth and Symbolism in California and the Southwest, edited by Thomas C. Blackburn, pp. 120–182. Ballena Press, Socorro, New Mexico. (Myths are used to illustrate themes concerning wealth, work, and emotion.)
- Cody, Bertha Parker. 1941. "Yurok Tales: Wohpekumen's Beads, as Told by Jan Van Stralen to Bertha P. Cody". The Masterkey 15:228-231.
- Curtis, Edward S. 1907-1930. The North American Indian. 20 vols. Plimpton Press, Norwood, Massachusetts. (Four myths collected from Weitchpec George, vol. 13, pp. 185–190.)
- Erikson, Erik H. 1943. "Observations on the Yurok: Childhood and World Image". University of California Publications in American Archaeology and Ethnology 35:257-301. Berkeley. (Includes a psychological interpretation of Yurok myths.)
- Graves, Charles S. 1929. Lore and Legends of the Klamath River Indians. Press of the Times, Yreka, California. (Includes Yurok, Karok, and Shasta narratives.)
- Holsinger, Rosemary. 1992. Yurok Tales. Bell Books, Etna, California.
- Judson, Katharine Berry. 1912. Myths and Legends of California and the Old Southwest. A. C. McClurg, Chicago. (One myth, p. 80.)
- Kroeber, A. L. 1911. "The Languages of the Coast of California North of San Francisco". University of California Publications in American Archaeology and Ethnology 9:273-435. Berkeley. (Includes Yurok myths, pp. 424–426.)
- Kroeber, A. L. 1925. Handbook of the Indians of California. Bureau of American Ethnology Bulletin No. 78. Washington, D.C. (Assorted narratives, pp. 5, 25, 28, 47, 73-74.)
- Kroeber, A. L. 1976. Yurok Myths. University of California Press, Berkeley. (Many narratives, including Theft of Fire and Orpheus, collected in 1900-1908, with commentaries.)
- Kroeber, A. L., and E. W. Gifford. 1947. "World Renewal: A Cult System of Native Northwest California". Anthropological Records 13:1-156. University of California, Berkeley. (Yurok and Karok myths, pp. 112–125.)
- Kroeber, Theodora. 1959. The Inland Whale. University of California Press. (Retelling of two traditional narratives with commentaries, pp. 17–38, 91-96, 159-167, 185-189.)
- Luthin, Herbert W. 2002. Surviving through the Days: A California Indian Reader. University of California Press, Berkeley. (One traditional narrative previously published in Robins 1958, pp. 85–89.)
- Margolin, Malcolm. 1993. The Way We Lived: California Indian Stories, Songs, and Reminiscences. First edition 1981. Heyday Books, Berkeley, California. (Two narratives, pp. 48–50, 141-142, from Sapir 1928 and from Spott and Kroeber 1942.)
- Powers, Stephen. 1877. Tribes of California. Contributions to North American Ethnology, vol. 3. Government Printing Office, Washington, D.C. Reprinted with an introduction by Robert F. Heizer in 1976, University of California Press, Berkeley. (Four narratives, pp. 59–64.)
- Reichard, Gladys A. 1925. "Wiyot Grammar and Texts". University of California Publications in American Archaeology and Ethnology 22:1-215. Berkeley. (Includes several Yurok tales recorded in 1922-1923.)
- Robins, Robert H. 1958. The Yurok Language: Grammar, Texts, Lexicon. University of California Publications in Linguistics No. 15. Berkeley. (Narratives collected in 1951.)
- Robins, Robert H. 1985. "The young Man from Serper: A Yurok Folktale". In Collectanea Philologica: Festschrift für Helmut Gipper zum 65, edited by G. Heinz and P. Schmitter, pp. 633–644. Valintin Koerner, Baden-Baden, Germany.
- Sapir, Jean. 1928. "Yurok Tales". Journal of American Folklore 41:253-261. (11 narratives, including Bear and Fawns, collected in 1928 from Mrs. Haydon.)
- Spott, Robert, and Alfred L. Kroeber. 1942. "Yurok Narratives". University of California Publications in American Archaeology and Ethnology 35:143-356. Berkeley. (Legends and myths with analytical discussions, pp. 210–251.)
