= Humboldt Lagoons State Park =

California state park

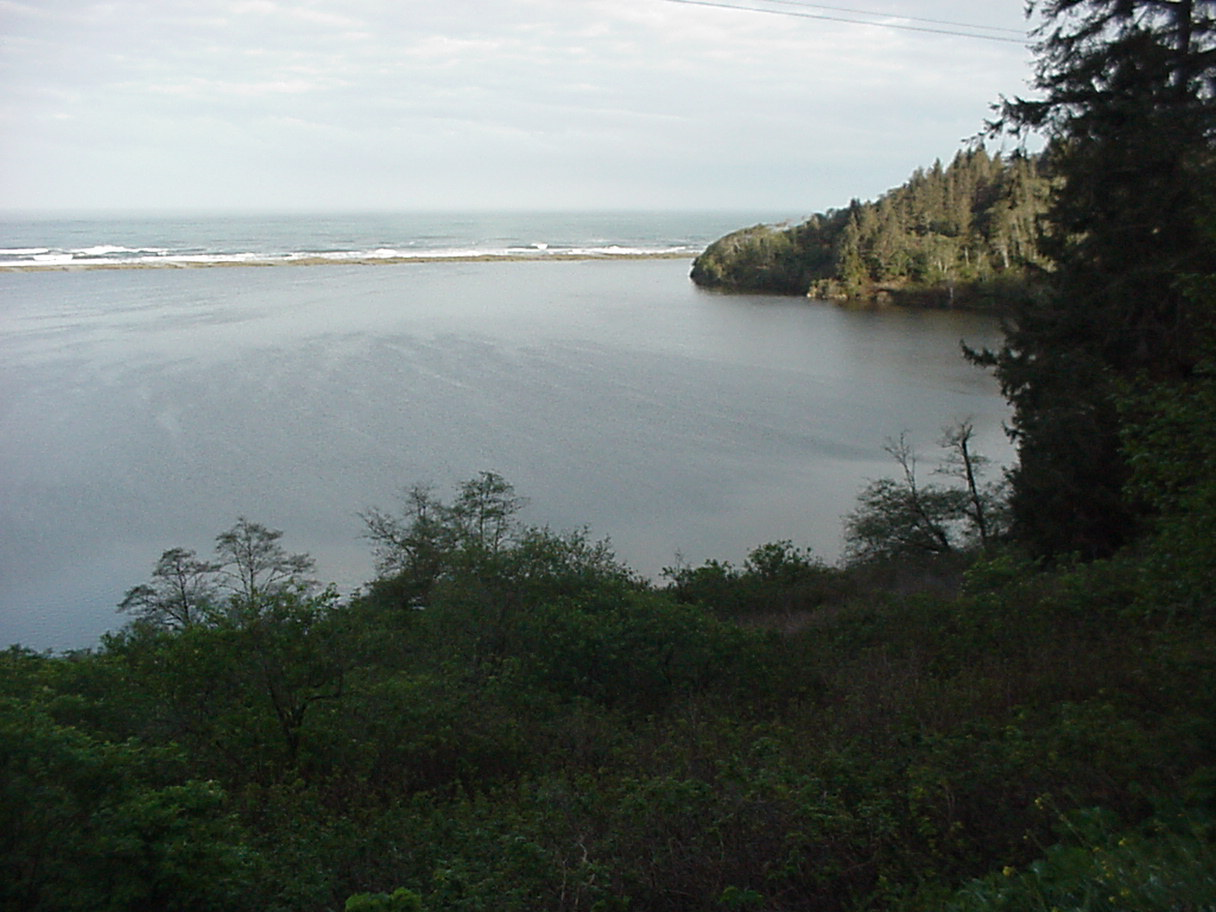
- Stone Lagoon and coastal bar viewed from Highway 101

- Location within California Location within the United States
- Location: Humboldt County, California, United States
- Nearest city: Trinidad, California
- Coordinates: 41°13′50″N 124°6′10″W
- Area: 2,256 acres (9.13 km^{2})
- Established: 1931
- Governing body: California Department of Parks and Recreation

Humboldt Lagoons State Park is a California State Park on the Redwood Coast, in Humboldt County, California. It is located along U.S. Route 101 between Trinidad and Orick. The park protects three lagoons with estuaries and wetlands.

== Geography ==
Big Lagoon is the largest and southernmost lagoon. Stone Lagoon is in the middle, and Freshwater Lagoon is the northernmost and smallest.

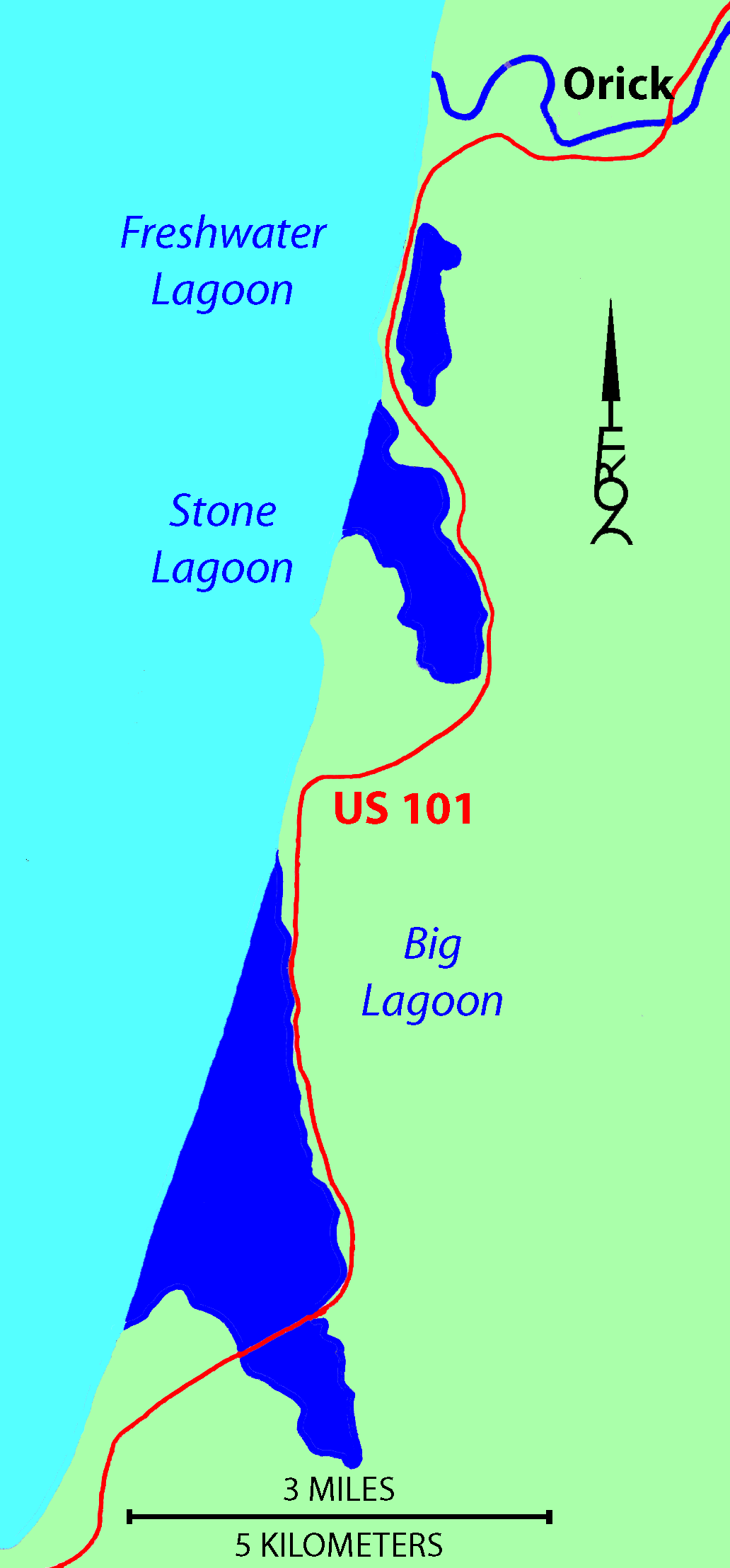

The lagoons are shallow bays between rocky headlands where coastal wave action has formed a sandy bar separating each lagoon from the ocean. The 2,256-acre (913 ha) park was established in 1931.

The lagoons are resting areas for migratory waterfowl using the Pacific Flyway between Lake Earl on the Smith River estuarine wetlands 40 miles (64 km) to the north and Humboldt Bay on the Mad River estuarine wetlands 30 miles (48 km) to the south. Studies around Humboldt Bay indicate tectonic activity along the Cascadia subduction zone has caused local sea level changes at intervals of several centuries. The alluvial plain forming each shallow lagoon may support freshwater wetlands or Sitka Spruce forests following uplift events and salt marsh or inundated shellfish beds following subsidence events.

=== Dry Lagoon ===
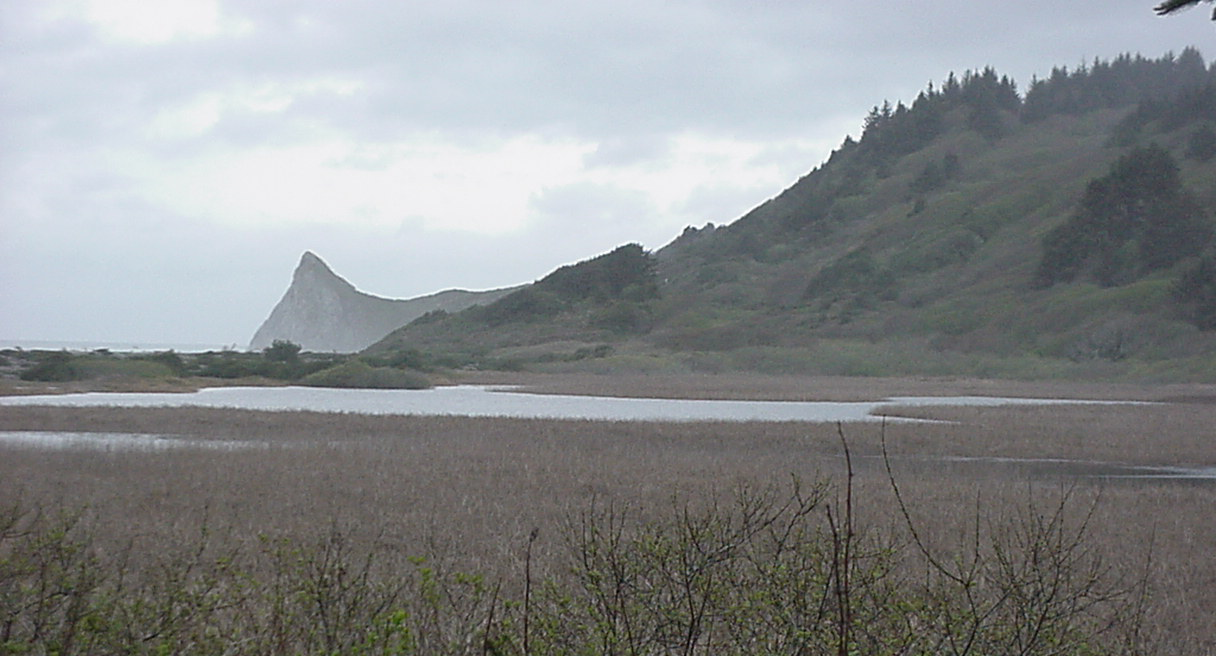
Dry Lagoon viewed from the south

Dry Lagoon, at the southern end of Stone Lagoon, is separated from Stone Lagoon by what may become an island if the sea level rises. Dry Lagoon is presently a wetland representing natural conditions of similar land used for a sawmill near Big Lagoon, or converted to agricultural purposes around the estuaries of Redwood Creek to the north and Little River to the south.

== See also ==
- List of beaches in California
- List of California state parks
- Parks in Humboldt County, California
