= Big Lagoon (California) =

Big Lagoon in Humboldt County, California

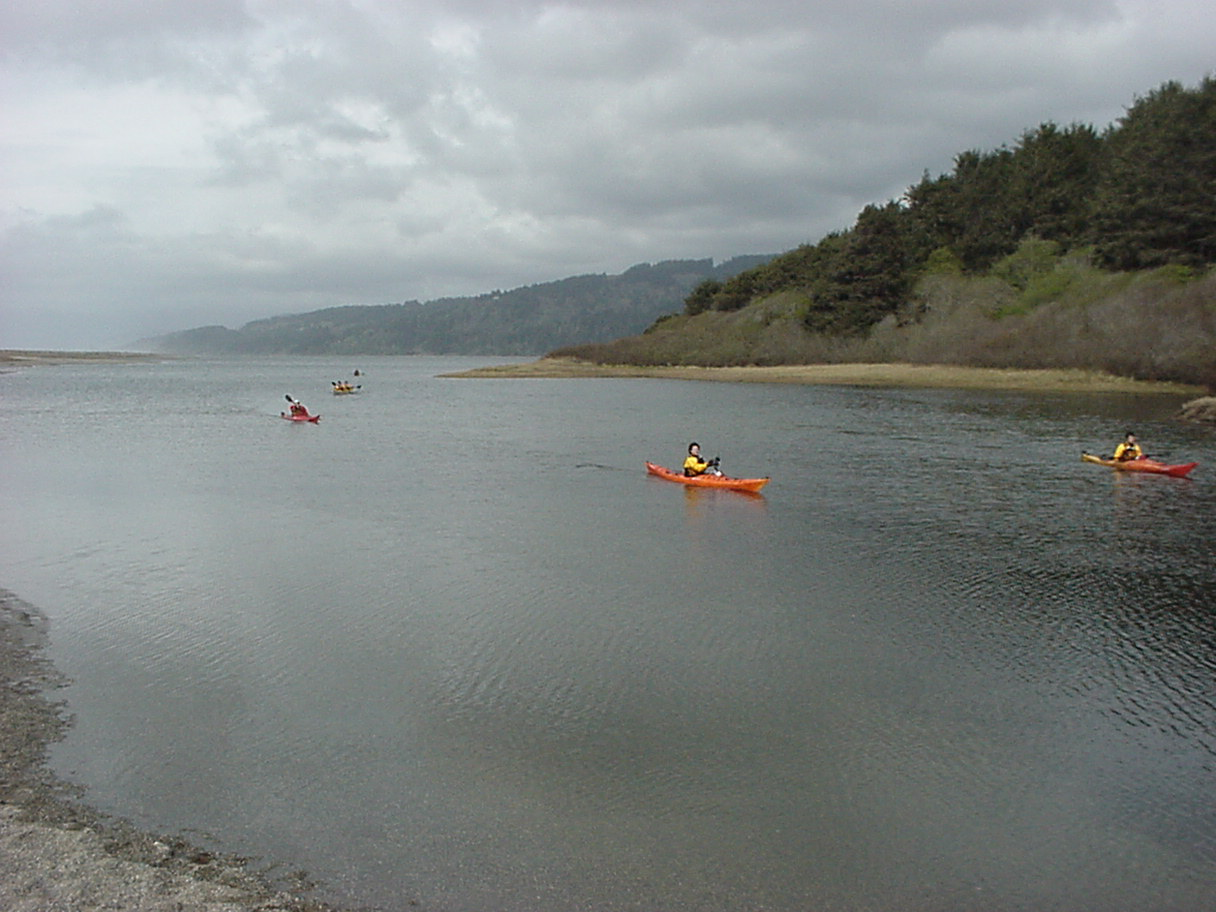
- Kayaks at the south end of Big Lagoon

- Location within California Location within the United States
- Location: Humboldt County, California
- Coordinates: 41°11′00″N 124°07′00″W
- Type: Lagoon
- Primary inflows: Maple Creek
- Primary outflows: Pacific Ocean
- Basin countries: United States
- Max. length: 3.8 mi (6 km)
- Max. width: 1.4 mi (2 km)
- Surface area: 1,470 acres (5.9 km^{2})
- Max. depth: 22 feet (6.7 m)
- Shore length^{1}: 9 miles (14 km)
- Surface elevation: 20 feet (6.1 m)
- Frozen: No
- ^{1} Shore length is not a well-defined measure.

hkj- 07.15.2024 (Big Lagoon, Yurok ceremonies are conducted at Big Lagoon, the Image depicts the part of the ceremony where the Natives cross the Lagoon in redwood canoes).

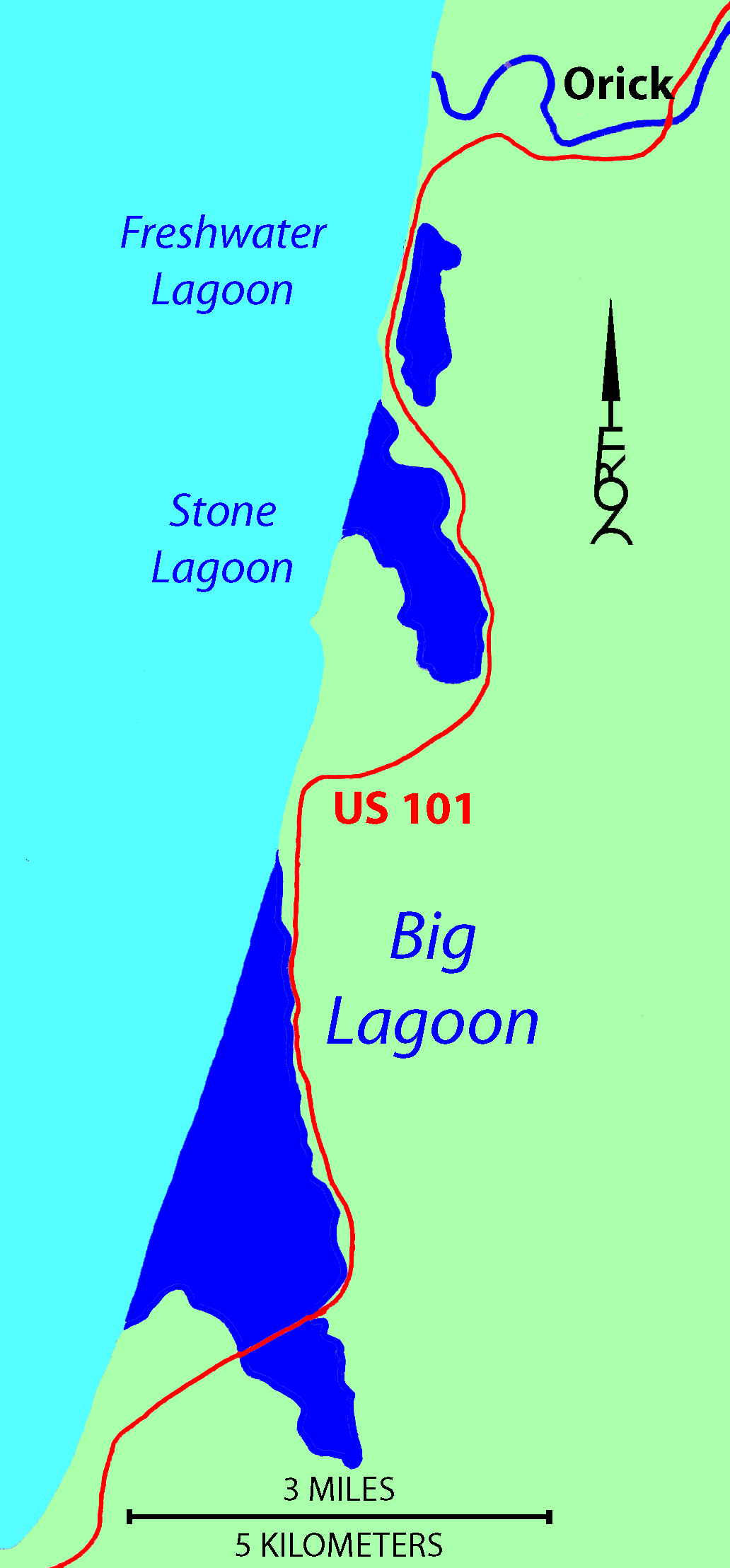

hkj 07.14.2024 (sunset at Big Lagoon, from the campground. approximately 8:27 p.m.).

Big Lagoon (Yurok: ʼO Ketʼueʼl) is the southernmost and the largest of four similar lagoons within Humboldt Lagoons State Park, along the coast of Humboldt County, California; the siblings lagoons are Stone Lagoon ('Chah-pekw OʼKet-tohʼ), Freshwater Lagoon and Dry Lagoon.

The lagoon is located between the towns of Trinidad, to the south and Orick at the mouth of Redwood Creek towards the northern section. Separated by a sandy bar, Big Lagoon specifically is a shallow bay-pool containing both fresh and salt water which spills into the Lagoon predominantly by the Pacific Ocean and Redwood Creek. From the geology to recreational use, Big Lagoon is a diverse and a rich body of water, reflecting the surrounding ecological complexity of the Humboldt County environment.

== Geology ==
Big Lagoon is similar to other coastal features of northern California including Humboldt Bay to the south and Lake Earl to the north; an alluvial plain is surrounded by steep uplands. Hills adjacent to Big Lagoon have been identified as the Franciscan Assemblage along the eastern shore and Pleistocene dune sandstone to the south. Studies around Humboldt Bay indicate tectonic activity along the Cascadia subduction zone has caused local sea level changes at intervals of several centuries. The plain may support fresh water wetlands or Sitka Spruce forests following uplift events and salt marsh or inundated shellfish beds following subsidence events. At the present lagoon level, the sand bar normally separates the lagoon from the ocean during summer months. Winter precipitation may raise the water level in the lagoon a few meters above sea level. Hydrostatic pressure and storm surf may then breach the sand bar allowing the lagoon to drain into the sea and then receive tidal inflow until wave action reforms the bar.

== Toponym ==
'O Ket'ue'l (Big Lagoon), translated to English as, “where there is a pool.” The Yurok Tribe’s language, Saa'agoch (Yurok Language), falls into the Algonquian language family prominently spoken among Indigenous people from northern California.

== History ==
=== Indigenous Presence ===
The original inhabitants of Big Lagoon were broadly referred to as “Coastal Yuroks," Ner'ernerh which is the collective name for those who lived in villages near the coast. Yuroks were the first peoples of this land, although there were other surrounding Tribes. One of which is the Tolowa Tribe, collectively the Tolowas and Yuroks are federally recognized through the Big Lagoon Rancheria.

=== European Settlers ===
During the surge of the Gold Rush, a large influx of pioneers embarked across California. The ecologically rich forest found in Humboldt presented timber as a more profitable resource in comparison to gold. Settlers would then cultivate, creating towns focused on timber extraction beginning around 1860. One of which being Hammond Lumber Company Plant Three, which included 20th century company housing and a sawmill log pond built where Maple Creek enters the south end of Big Lagoon.

Additionally, the coastal portion of Big Lagoon was used as an aerial rocket range by the United States Navy during World War II.

== Ecology ==
The estuary of Big lagoon is diverse, it encapsulates a sand spit dividing the lagoon from the ocean, marshes with mud spits, then further inland the area is covered in Coastal Redwood and Sitka Spruce forests. The lagoon and the surrounding area is home to a diverse array of species, many of which are endangered and scarcely found elsewhere.

=== Flora ===
Dune mats can be found along the Lagoon, made up of several low growing plant species; consisting of shrubs and flowers native to the area. They are essential in providing habitat to small creatures and organisms while they structure to loose sand. Found within the dune mats, is the Humboldt Bay wallflower and the beach layia which are currently endangered species.

Away from the shore and beach of Big lagoon, the geography shifts into a temperate rainforest ecosystem.A significant element to the ecology of the forest surrounding Big Lagoon are the coastal redwoods (Sequoia sempervirens). Settler colonial implications such as the logging epidemic resulted in the majority of coastal redwood old growth to be lost to environmental exploitation, leaving roughly (4-5%) remaining. Although coastal redwoods are an endangered species, they can still be found around Big Lagoon.

=== Fauna ===
Various ecosystems exist within the area of Big Lagoon. From coastal wetlands to conifer forests, Big Lagoon’s environment is a habitat of many rare and endangered species.

Roughly 178 different species of birds can be found at Big Lagoon State park.There is an emphasis on the presence of the Western Snowy Plover (Anarhynchus nivosus). The Snowy Plover has diminished to an optimistic estimate of 1,500 left in California. Their populations have significantly declined due to human implications such as; littering and destruction of nesting sites. State parks are actively working to protect these birds through monitoring and reserving areas of the beach. These proctective measures are visibale on the sand bar of Big Lagoon.

Recently there has been restoration of Prey-go-neesh (Yurok language) California Condor (Gymnogyps californianus) to the local area surrounding Big Lagoon, the condors have been spotted flying above Big lagoon. The Yurok Tribe, Redwoods National and State Parks functioning through the Northern California Condor Restoration Program (NCCRP) have re-introduced this key species into the area. In the 1980’s the condors approached extinction with only 22 birds left in total. Currently thanks to collective efforts there are approximately 216 wild individuals flying throughout California. The birds hold cultural significance within traditional ceremonies to the Yurok people. As well as ecological impact through their consumption of carcass they prevent diseases and disperse nutrients within the ecosystem through their digestive process.

The Roosevelt elk (Cervus elaphus roosevelti) is a prominent species found in specific areas along the coast. Roosevelt elk graze the wetlands south of the lagoon and may sometimes be seen where U.S. Route 101 crosses the lagoon. They are a fan favorite of the tourists, and locals along the coast.

The sand spit acts as a barrier across the lagoon to the ocean mitigating the water flow depending on natural factors such as wave severity, littoral sand transport and the inflow of fresh water. Breeching is not an annual occurrence resulting in the lagoon retaining water comparable to that of the oceans. The condition of the water has allowed the aquatic life to adapt to tolerate both salt and freshwater conditions. Notable species include: Chinook Salmon, pacific herring, coho salmon, green sturgeon, various types of smelt… etc. Because of the unique water composition, Big Lagoon is able to support various species that wouldn't typically be found in the same water.

== Climate ==
The climate of Big Lagoon is predominantly influenced by the Pacific Ocean, winds and water vapor contribute to the low and humid temperatures of the area. Fog is a common characteristic of this climate, it often is cleared by afternoon hours.

The climate of Big Lagoon is also characterized by influences from the coastal redwoods. Coastal redwoods, (Sequoia sempervirens), the tallest living trees in the world, accumulate roughly 30% of their annual water intake from fog. These trees, in turn, regulate local temperature by releasing or absorbing water, which provides moisture to the surrounding ecosystem. Condensation and runoff from these trees can also create microclimates.

On average the summer temperatures can range from the 50’s to 60’s in Fahrenheit, this doesn’t fluctuate significantly during the transition from fall to winter. Although the temperature doesn’t drastically change with the seasons, the rainfall has records of 60-80 inches in the cooler months of October through April.

=== Climate Change ===
Precipitation and rainfall counts have had record lows, along with record highs in temperature in Humboldt County. The impact of climate change on Big lagoon can be seen in various issues in the area.

For instance, the deaths of 14 dogs after going swimming have occurred in the last twenty years due to cyanobacteria in blue-green algae on the Big Lagoon, South Fork Eel River or the Van Duzen River during times of warm weather and low water flow. Blue-green algae can impact people too, such as symptoms of nausea and head pain have resulted from exposure. On a positive note, as of 2025, advisories on water access due to blue-green algae were revoked.

== Recreation ==
Big Lagoon is part of the Big Lagoon County Park, managed by the County of Humboldt and the California State Parks system assisted in some cases by the Tribes.

The Lagoon itself offers a variety of activities open to the public; sailing, canoeing, and fishing. All permitted with the correctly equipped permits and understanding of park guidelines. The surrounding area provides visitors with opportunities to adventure on easy to moderate hikes and camp a few feet away from the Lagoon.

== See also ==
- Freshwater Lagoon
- Big lagoon State Park
- Stone Lagoon
- Yurok Tribe
