= Big Lagoon Rancheria =

Indian tribe in California, United States

Coordinates: 41.1642580°N 124.1207870°W

’O Ket’oh (Yurok) Tee-xuu-nin’-dvn (Tolowa)

Total population
- 17

Regions with significant populations
- United States ( California)

Languages
- English, Tolowa, Yurok

Religion
- traditional tribal religion, World Renewal religion, Indian Shaker Church, Assembly of God

Related ethnic groups
- other Tolowa and Yurok tribes

The Big Lagoon Rancheria (Yurok: ’O Ket’oh; Tolowa: Tee-xuu-nin’-dvn) is a federally recognized tribe of Yurok and Tolowa Indians. They are located in Humboldt County, California, and their tribal headquarters is in Arcata, California.

== Government ==
The tribe was first recognized by the US federal government on 10 July 1918. Tribal enrollment is based on a minimum of 1/8 blood quantum and lineal descent from the Plan of Distribution on the Assets of the Big Lagoon Rancheria, created January 3, 1968. The tribe has 24 enrolled members.

== Reservation ==
Location of Big Lagoon Rancheria

The Big Lagoon Rancheria was established in 1918. Their 20-acre (81,000 m^{2}) reservation is adjacent to Big Lagoon, a beautiful waterway, located 30 miles (48 km) north of Eureka, California. It also lies adjacent to the unincorporated community of Big Lagoon, California, and near the historic Yurok settlement of Oketo. Eight households reside on the reservation. The tribe has been able to improve the local water facilities and road system on the reservation. As of the 2010 Census the population was 17.

== Education ==
The ranchería is served by the Big Lagoon Union Elementary School District and Northern Humboldt Union High School District.

== Economic development ==
Due to the highly sensitive environment of the reservation, the tribe has agreed with the state of California to not develop the reservation. Instead the tribe has partnered with the Los Coyotes Band of Cahuilla and Cupeño Indians to operate the Barstow Casino and Resort in Barstow, California.

The historical Arcata Hotel in Arcata is owned and operated by the Big Lagoon Rancheria.

== See also ==
- List of Indian reservations in the United States
