= Yurok Indian Reservation =

Coordinates: 41°22′20″N 123°53′30″W

Yurok Reservation
- Native American Reservation
- Yurok Indian Reservation
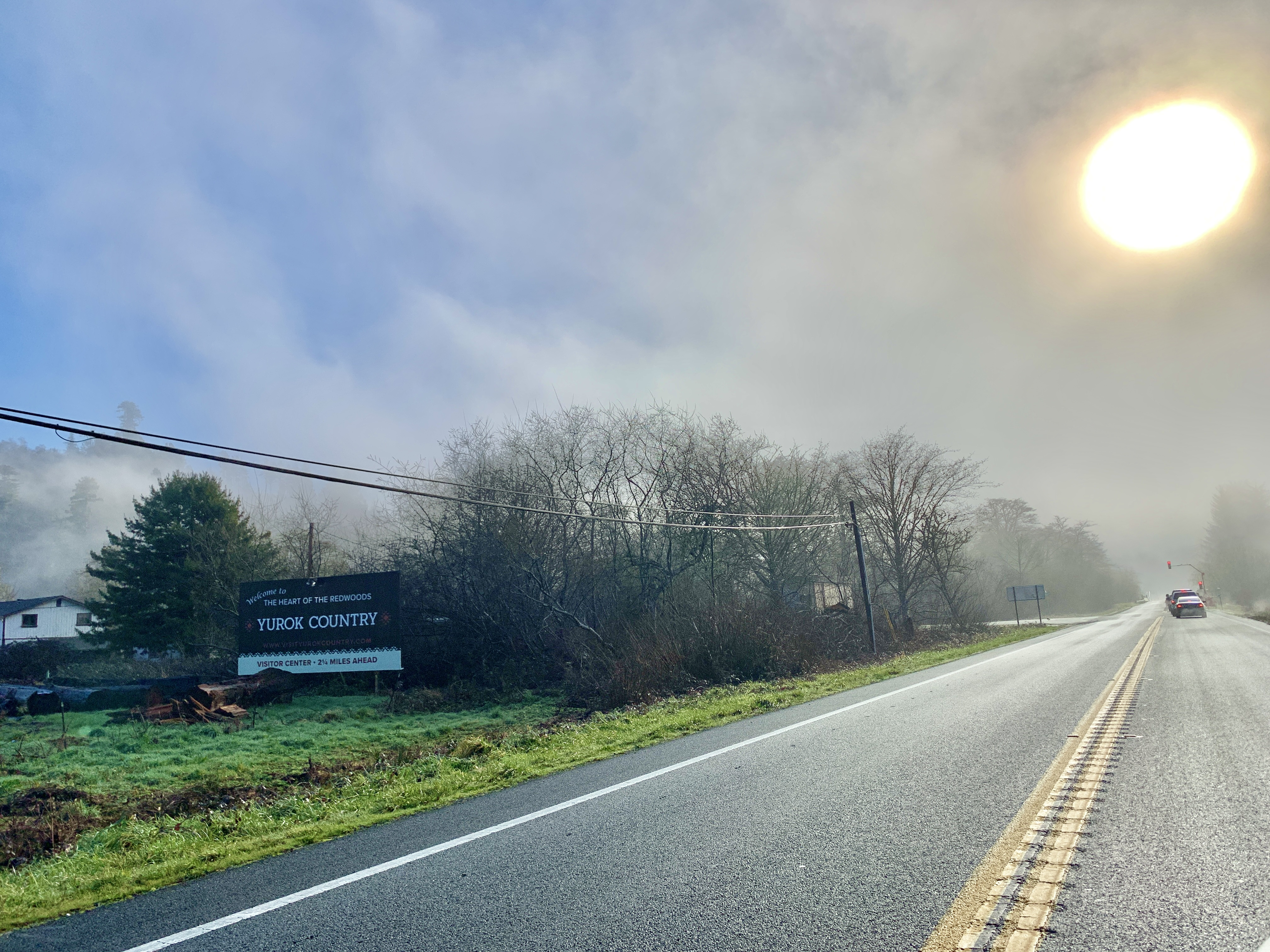
- Yurok Indian Reservation

- Location of Yurok Indian Reservation
- Country: United States
- State: California
- Counties: Del Norte; Humboldt
- Tribal Nation: Yurok
- Administrative Capital: Klamath, California

Government
  - Body: Yurok Tribe Tribal Council
  - Chairman: Joe James
  - Vice Chairman: Frankie Myers

Area
  - Total: 88.08 sq mi (228.1 km^{2})
  - Land: 84.73 sq mi (219.4 km^{2})
  - Water: 3.35 sq mi (8.7 km^{2})

Population
  - Total: 1,236
- Website: https://www.yuroktribe.org/

The Yurok Indian Reservation is a Native American reservation for the Yurok people located in parts of Del Norte and Humboldt counties, California, on a 44-mile (71 km) stretch of the Klamath River. It is one of a very few tribes who have never been removed from their ancestral lands in California.

The 84.714 square miles (219.41 km^{2}) reservation is serviced by California Route 169 from the south, which dead ends within the reservation. It is bordered by the Hoopa Indian Reservation to the south, adjacent to Redwood National Park to the west and completely surrounds the Pulikla Tribe of Yurok People. The 2000 census reported a resident population of 1,103 persons on reservation territory, mostly in the community of Klamath, at the reservation's north end. As of the 2010 Census the population was 1,238 and as of the 2020 census it was 1,236.

In 2024, 125 acres (51 ha) of land that had been taken from the tribe during the California gold rush was added to the reservation. It will be co-managed with the National Park Service. Leading up to June 2025, a total of 47,000 acres (19,000 ha) was added to the reservation in a Land Back deal, doubling the reservation's size.

Map of Yurok Reservation with districts and nearby reservations (In blue.)

== See also ==
- Yurok language
- List of Indian reservations in the United States
- Redwoods Rising

== Climate ==
Climate data for Yurok Reservation, California
Month	Jan	Feb	Mar	Apr	May	Jun	Jul	Aug	Sep	Oct	Nov	Dec	Year
Mean daily maximum °F (°C)	50 (10)	52 (11)	55 (13)	60 (16)	67 (19)	72 (22)	78 (26)	79 (26)	78 (26)	67 (19)	55 (13)	49 (9)	64 (18)
Mean daily minimum °F (°C)	37 (3)	37 (3)	37 (3)	39 (4)	43 (6)	49 (9)	56 (13)	55 (13)	53 (12)	47 (8)	40 (4)	37 (3)	44 (7)
Average precipitation inches (mm)	16.28 (414)	12.97 (329)	12.83 (326)	9.36 (238)	5.15 (131)	1.91 (49)	0.54 (14)	0.62 (16)	1.55 (39)	6.69 (170)	12.65 (321)	19.85 (504)	100.4 (2,551)
Source: Prism
