= Big Lagoon Union Elementary School District =

School district in California, United States

Address
- 269 Big Lagoon Park Road Trinidad, California, 95570; United States
- Coordinates: 41°9′37″N 124°8′1″W

District information
- Type: Public
- Grades: K–8
- NCES District ID: 0604890

Students and staff
- Students: 24
- Teachers: 2.0 (FTE)
- Staff: 2.77 (FTE)
- Student–teacher ratio: 12.0

Other information
- Website: www.biglagoon.org

The Big Lagoon Union School District, headquartered in Big Lagoon, California, oversees public education, through grade 8, in a portion of coastal northern Humboldt County, California. It operates one K-8 school in Big Lagoon.
