= Mattz v. Arnett =

- Supreme Court of the United States

Decided June 11, 1973
- Full case name: Mattz v. Arnett
- Citations: 412 U.S. 481 (more)

Holding
- The Hoopa Valley Reservation remained Indian country despite an act of Congress.

Court membership
- Chief Justice Warren E. Burger Associate Justices William O. Douglas · William J. Brennan Jr. Potter Stewart · Byron White; Thurgood Marshall · Harry Blackmun; Lewis F. Powell Jr. · William Rehnquist

Mattz v. Arnett was a United States Supreme Court case in which the Court held that the land that had been the Klamath River Reservation and was incorporated into the Hoopa Valley Reservation in 1891 remained Indian country within the meaning of 18 U.S.C. §1151 despite the Act of June 17, 1892. The holding required California game wardens to return of five gill nets because the land was within the reservation boundaries and California lacked jurisdiction to enforce California law that interfered with rights reserved by the Yurok Tribe.

== History ==
On September 4, 1969, the State arrested Yurok Tribal member Raymond Mattz while he was fishing with four other Yurok fishermen. California game wardens seized 5 nylon gill nets from where they were strung across a point at Brooks Riffle on the Lower Klamath River, less than 20 miles from the mouth of the Klamath, from Fee Land claimed by a lumber company within the Yurok Reservation. The California game wardens alleged a violation of California Fish and Game Code section 8630.

On Oct. 21, 1971, the petition to intervene by Yurok Tribal member Raymond Mattz to resist the forfeiture of the gill nets, asserting that an enrolled Indian fishing in Indian country could not be statutory prohibited from using traditional gill nets, was denied by the trial court. The state trial court found that the Klamath River Reservation in 1892 ‘for all practical purposes almost immediately lost its identity,’ and concluded that the area was not Indian country. The state Court of Appeal affirmed, holding that since the area had been opened for unrestricted homestead entry in 1892, the earlier reservation status of the land had terminated. Raymond Mattz appealed the State Courts’ decisions to the Supreme Court of the United States and won.
