= Yurok =

Indigenous people in California, United States

ʼOolekwoh ʼOʼloolekweesh ʼoʼl
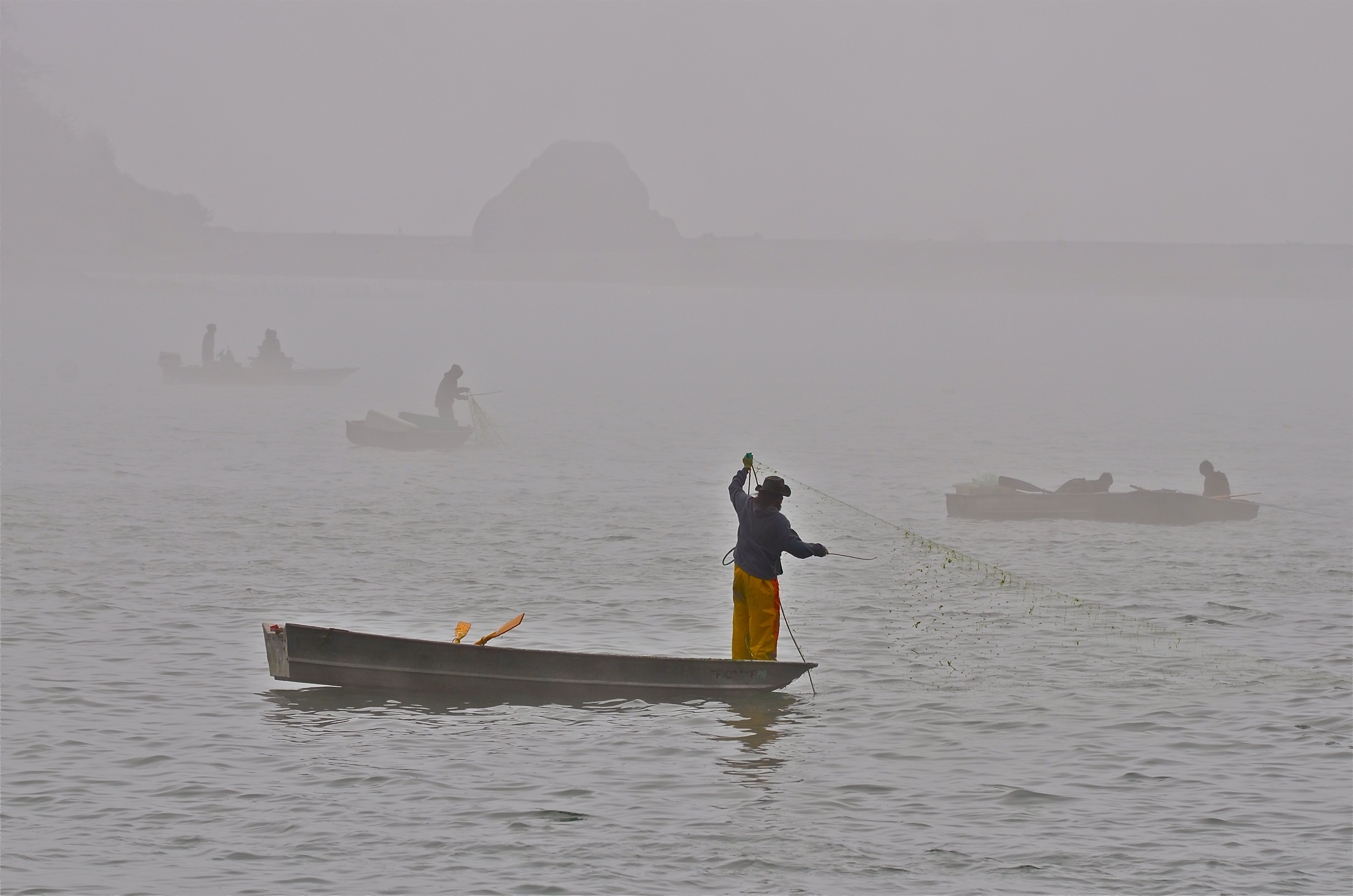
- Yurok Fishing, Mouth of the Klamath River

Total population
- 6,567 alone and in combination (2010)

Regions with significant populations
- United States (California)

Languages
- English, Yurok

Religion
- Yurok Religion, Christianity

Related ethnic groups
- Wiyot

The Yurok people are an Indigenous people of California, whose territory is along the Klamath River, from Trinidad south of the Klamath's mouth almost to Crescent City along the north coast. Their Yurok language is an Algic language.

Today, Yurok people are enrolled in the federally recognized tribes:

- Yurok Tribe of the Yurok Reservation
- Pulikla Tribe of Yurok People
- Cher-Ae Heights Indian Community of the Trinidad Rancheria
- Big Lagoon Rancheria

Yurok descendants may be enrolled in other tribes.

The Yurok people live primarily within the exterior boundaries of Yurok Reservation and surrounding communities in Humboldt, Del Norte and Trinity counties. Although the reservation comprises some 56,000 acres (23,000 ha) of contiguous land along the Klamath River, only about 5,000 acres (2,000 ha) of scattered plots are under partial tribal ownership. Most Yurok land is owned by timber corporations or is part of national parks and forests. This forest management has significantly disempowered the Yurok people and disrupted their ability to access natural resources, land, and practice Indigenous lifeways. In June 2025, land purchases from timber companies by conservationists groups to create the Blue Creek Salmon Sanctuary and Yurok Tribal Community Forest were completed and transferred to the Tribe in what is said to be the largest land back conservation deal to date.

== Name ==
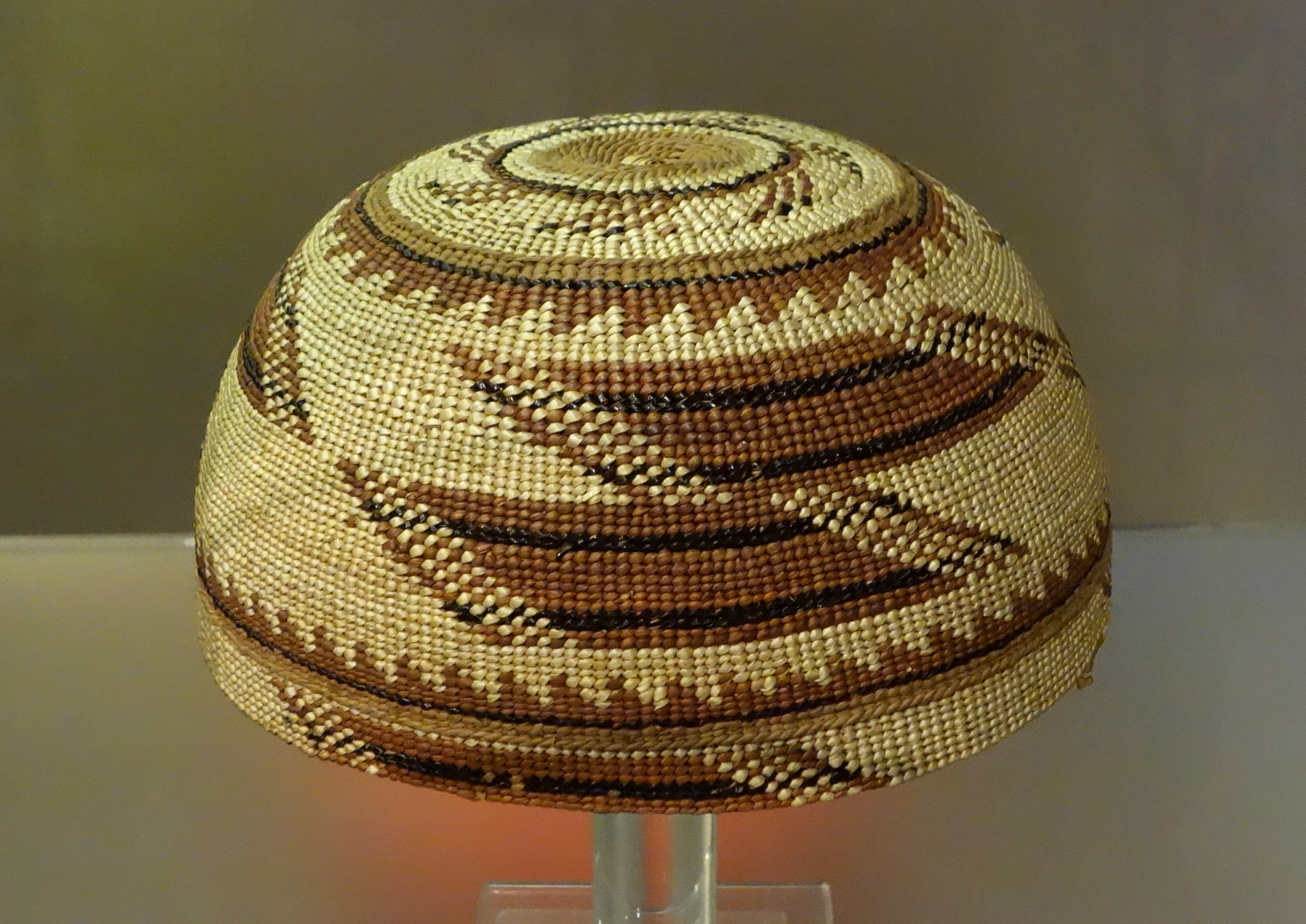
Yurok woman's basketry hat, pre-1909, Oakland Museum

The Yurok refer to themselves as ʼOohl ("person") or ʼOʼloolekweesh ʼoʼl / ʼOolekwoh (lit. "ʼoʼloolekw [= "village"] dwellers"). Nerʼernerh / Nertʼernerh ("Coast people, i.e. Coast Yurok") refers to Yurok on the coast and Hehlkeeklaa ("Klamath River people, i.e. Klamath River Yurok") refers to Yurok who live along the Klamath River. Pueleeklaa / Pueleeklaʼ or Puelekueklaʼ / Puelekueklaaʼ ("down river/downstream people, i.e. River Yurok") is used to distinguish themselves from the upriver (Klamath River) living Karuk (Pechkuelaaʼ / Pecheekla = "up river/upstream people, i.e. Karuk people"). Saaʼagochʼ / Saaʼagochehl ("Yurok language") is one of two Algic languages spoken in California, the other being Wiyot, and it is currently undergoing a successful revitalization effort.

The Yuroks' name for themselves is ʼOohl, meaning "the people." Some historic documents, like the Yurok Tribe's unratified treaty with the Government of the United States (GoUS), refer to the Yurok Tribe as the Lower Klamath, Pulikla, or Poh-lik Indians to distinguish the people of the Yurok Tribe from the "Upper Klamath" or "Peh-tsick" Indians, who are now known as the Karuk Tribe. The name Yurok is derived from the Karuk word yúruk vaʼáraaras, meaning "downriver people; i.e. Yurok Indians". American ethnologist George Gibbs first recorded the term as 'Yourrk' while traveling with Col. Redick McKee in 1851, and mistakenly used it as the name of the tribe in his book, Observations on the Indians of the Klamath River and Humboldt Bay, Accompanying Vocabularies of Their Languages, published in 1887. These names all developed from the way the river was, and still is, centered in the worldview of the people of the Yurok Tribe. Traditionally, the people of the Yurok Tribe would refer to villages downriver as Pueleeklaa (meaning 'Down River Indian'), villages upriver as Pechkuelaaʼ (meaning 'Up River Indian'), and villages on the Pacific coast as Nerʼernerh (meaning "Coast Indian"). However, all these terms were merely practical descriptions of how to get to or from a village location within the Ancestral Land of the Yurok Tribe; the Pueleeklaa, Pechkuelaaʼ and Nerʼernerh were, and are, all still ʼOohl.

== History ==
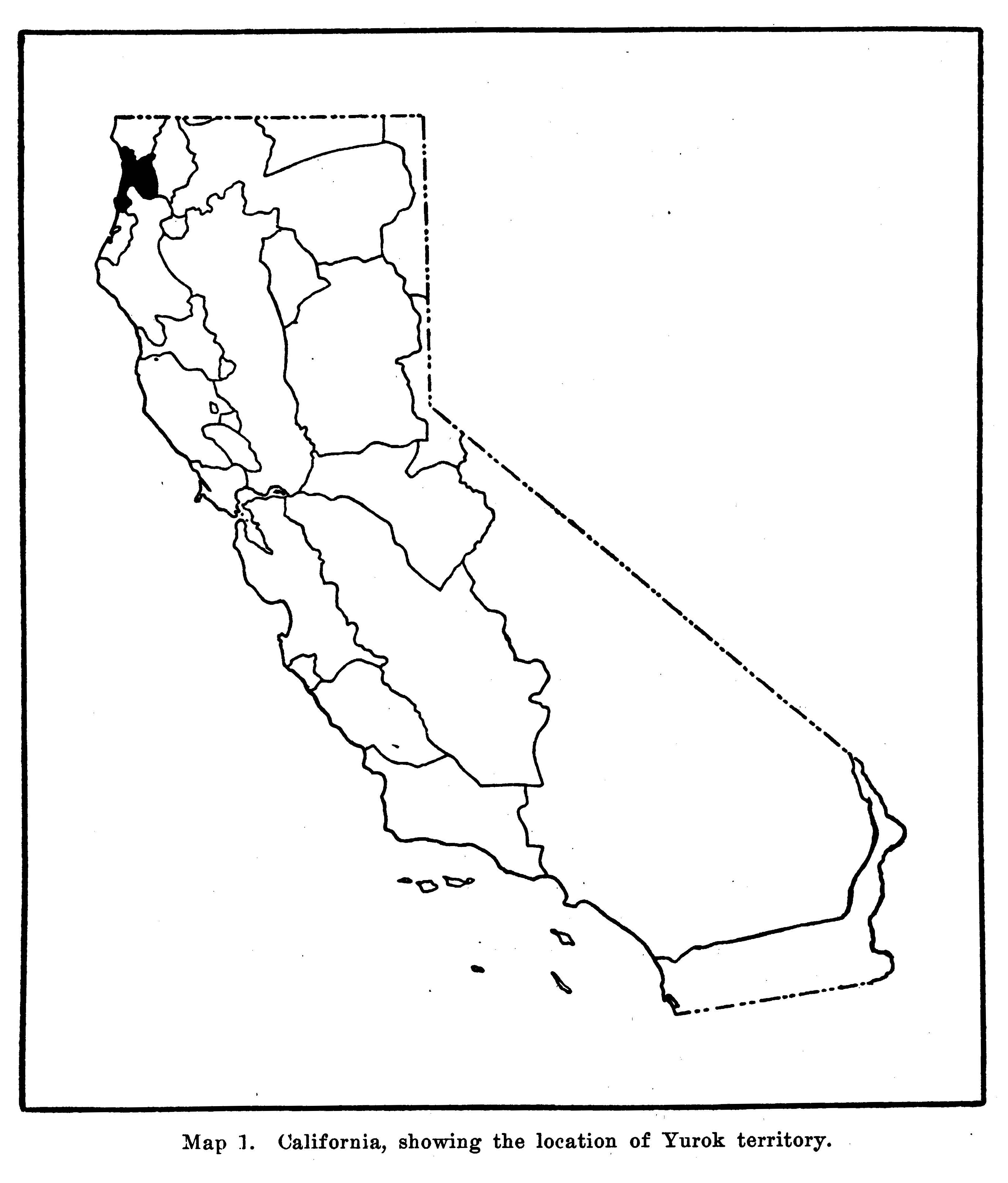
Traditional territory of the Yurok

=== Precontact ===
Native Americans have been living along the Klamath River for 10,000 years, with a lifestyle closely linked to the once abundant salmon. Some Yurok villages date back to the 14th century CE.

=== 16th century ===
There are descriptions of some contact being made with Californian Indians as far back as June 1579 by Francis Drake and the crew of the Golden Hind.

=== 19th century ===
Fur traders and trappers from the Hudson's Bay Company came in 1827. Following encounters with white settlers moving into their aboriginal lands during a gold rush in 1850, the Yurok were faced with disease and massacres that reduced their population by 75%. In 1855, following the Klamath and Salmon River War, the Lower Klamath River Indian Reservation was created by executive order. The reservation boundaries included a portion of the Yurok's territory and some Yurok villages.

=== 20th century ===
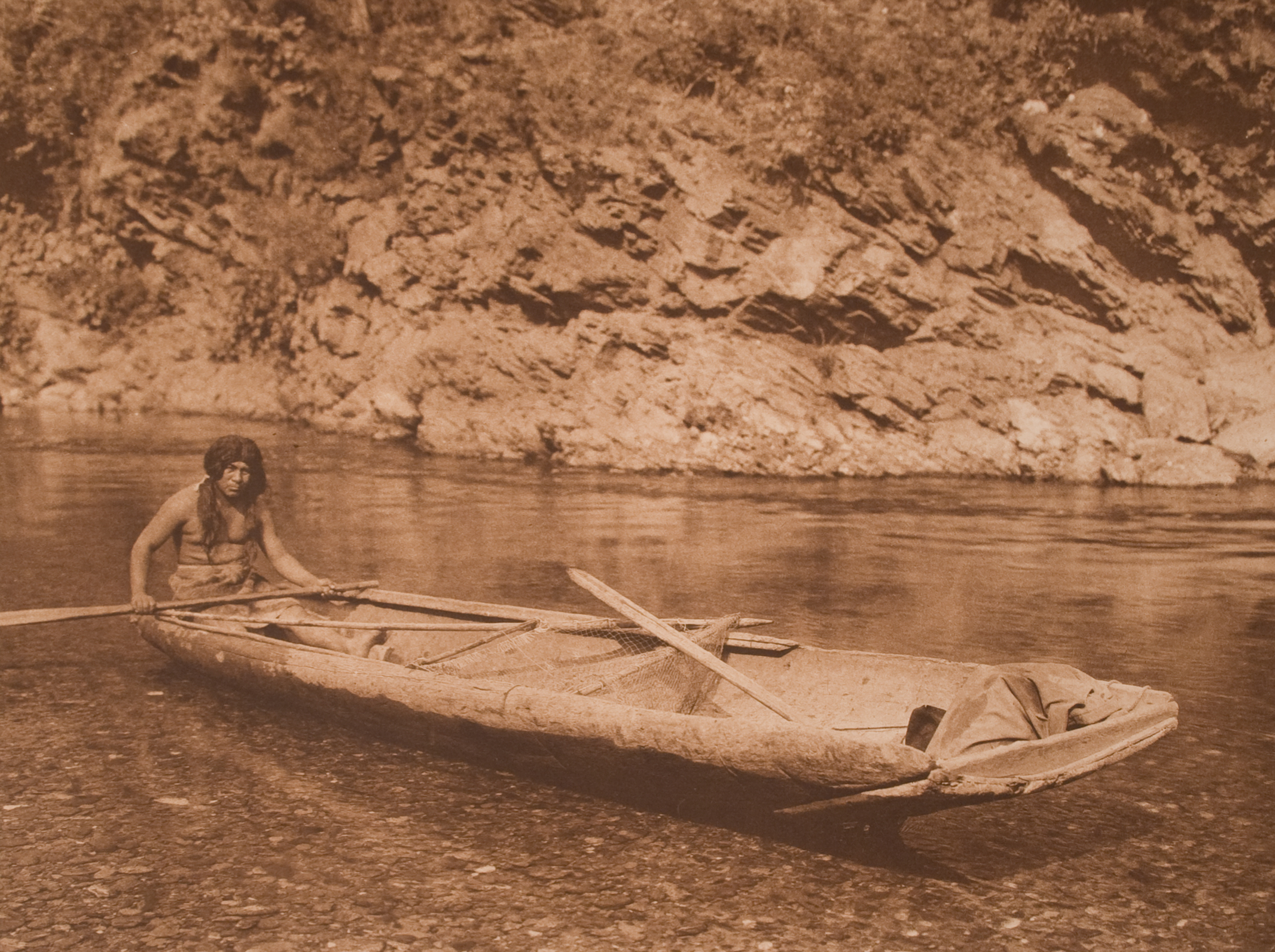
Yurok man and canoe on the Trinity River by Edward S. Curtis, c. 1923

The Hoopa-Yurok Settlement Act of 1988, an acted passed by the 2nd Session of the 100th Congress of 1988, declared that Yurok descendants who have chosen to remain citizens of recognized tribes other than the Yurok Tribe of the Yurok Reservation - primarily the Resighini Rancheria, but also the Cher-Ae Heights Indian Community of the Trinidad Rancheria and Big Lagoon Rancheria - "shall no longer have any right or interest whatsoever in the tribal, communal, or unallotted land, property, resources, or rights within, or appertaining to, the Yurok Indian Reservation or the Yurok Tribe." The Resighini Rancheria attempted to challenge the Hoopa-Yurok Settlement Act in 1992 case Shermoen v. United States, 982 F.2d 1312, 1314 (9th Cir. 1992), but the court ruling in the case found that "In the Hoopa-Yurok Settlement Act, Congress sought to resolve the legal conflicts by: (1) partitioning the reservation into two reservations, designating the Square as the "Hoopa Valley Reservation" and the Extension as the "Yurok Reservation," 25 U.S.C. § 1300i-1; (2) distributing the escrow funds, 25 U.S.C. § 1300i-33; (3) confirming the statutes of the Hoopa Valley Tribe, and designating the Square or Hoopa Valley Reservation as the reservation to be held in trust for the Hoopa Valley Tribe, 25 U.S.C. § 1300i-1(b) 7; (4) recognizing and organizing the Yurok Tribe, and designating the Addition or Yurok Reservation as the reservation to be held in trust for the Yurok Tribe, 25 U.S.C. § 1300i-1(c) 8." Shermoen v. U.S., 982 F.2d 1312, 1316 (9th Cir. 1992)

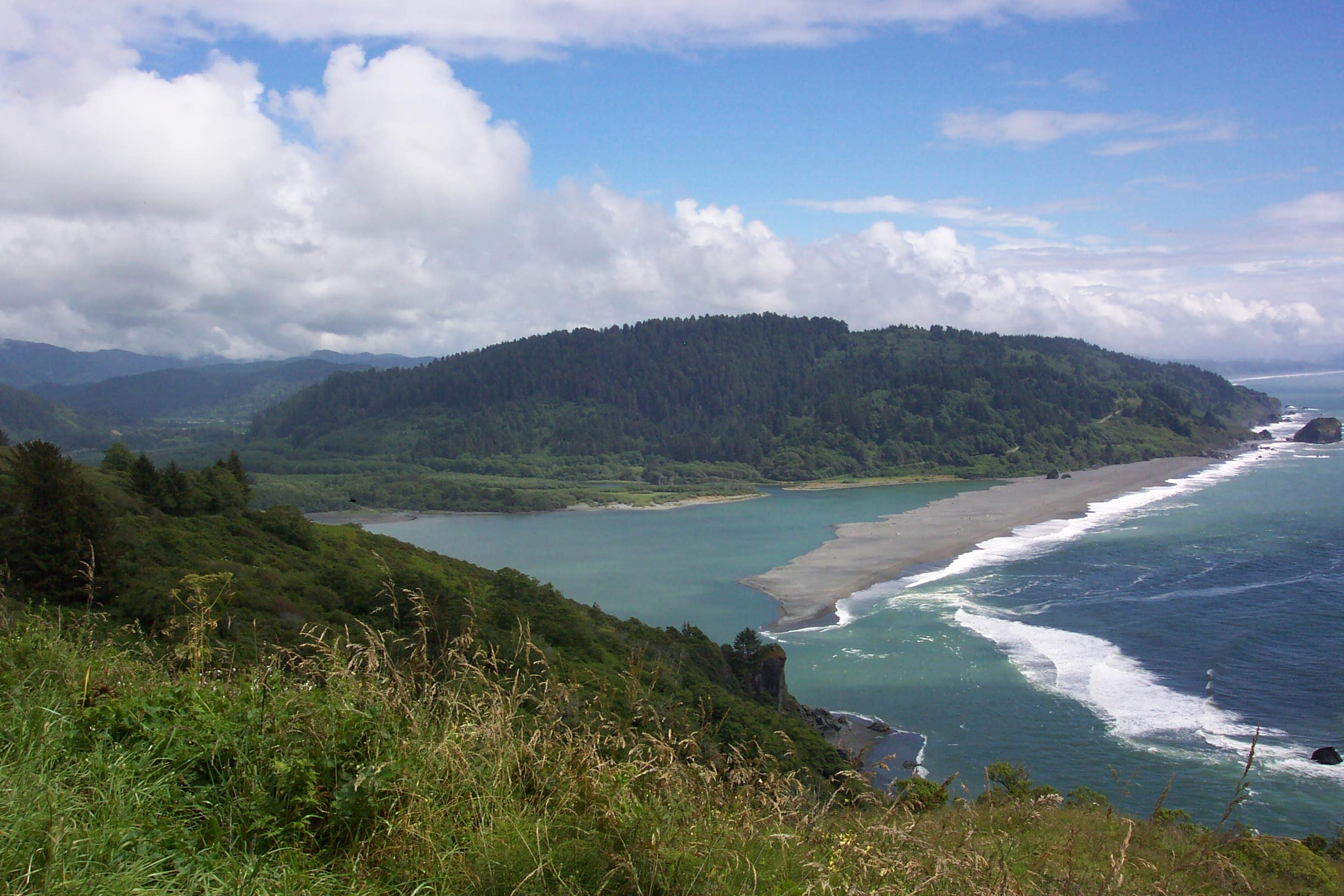
Mouth of the Klamath River at the Pacific Ocean

Fishing, hunting, and gathering remain important to tribal members. Basket weaving and woodcarving are important arts. A traditional hamlet of wooden plank buildings, called Sumeg, was built in 1990. The Jump Dance (woneek 'we-legoo) and Brush Dance (meloo) remain part of tribal ceremonies. The tribe's involvement in condor reintroduction, along with traditional burning, environmental restoration, wildfire preparedness, the drought, and juvenile fish kill, was discussed with Governor Gavin Newsom when he visited in June 2021.

The tribe owns and operates a casino, river jet boat tours, and other tourist attractions. The Yurok Tribe Construction Corporation has several projects that it is taking part in at the moment, including Orick Mill, Coffee Creek, Heliwood, Oregon Gulch and Condor Aviation. In 2023, the construction company carved out new channels for the Chinook salmon along the Sacramento River. They introduced vegetation into the channels to act as cover for juvenile salmon to hide in.

== Environment ==
=== Carbon sequestration ===
Through oral tradition and archaeological records, it is estimated that the Yurok lands were originally some half-a-million acres. In 1855 they were confined to a reservation of around 90,000 acres (36,000 ha): by 1993, this had declined to around 5% of the original reservation. Carbon sequestration has enabled the Yurok to own approximately 100,000 acres (40,000 ha) by 2021. Because of this effort, the Yurok have been awarded the Equator Prize by the United Nations Development Program. Using the cap-and-trade scheme, the California Air Resources Board (CARB) issues one offset credit ($12) for each metric ton the Yurok can prove its forests have sequestered.

After starting negotiations in 2010, the Yurok have paid off loans, supported schools, youth programming, housing, road improvement and off-reservation businesses through carbon sequestration. Land reclamation using the cap-in-trade revenue has allowed them to take control of land management and to sustainably harvest timber. Tribal Vice Chairman Frankie Myers said: "the most beneficial thing we're doing with our land is giving members access to it". Through working with companies and organisations such as New Forests and The Trust for Public Land, the Yurok will employ a blend of Traditional Ecological Knowledge and western science to re-create the environmental conditions that existed in this region.

The participation by the Yurok in the scheme has been met with concerns and criticism. "I'm not happy with it" said Jene McCovey, a tribal elder. "It's not viable. It allows polluters to pollute". Tribal member Marty Lamebear agreed that the carbon project had brought in money but said: "They buy our air, so they can, you know, pollute theirs." Angela Adrar, the executive director of Climate Justice Alliance, said: "The Yurok should have their land regardless of some program... The fact that they have to sell their forest to get back their land seems really backwards."

=== Wind power ===
In February 2024, the Yurok had its first Tribal Offshore Wind Summit to help native communities gain more understanding about offshore wind power and how the ever-growing clean energy developments could impact on the food, culture and income for Native communities. A central point emerged from the Summit that there could not be responsible offshore wind development "in tribal areas without tribal consent" and that tribal leaders were concerned about their role in the decision-making process. A major topic of conversation were the two Humboldt area wind farms and how the industrialization involved might impact the local ports and surrounding areas. Robert Hemstead, vice-chairman for the Trinidad Rancheria said that people from the tribes had come together "to move forward in a good way on renewable energy". Yurok Chairman Joseph L. James said that the tribes did not want to see other industries "take advantage of our natural resources and contribute little or nothing to the local community."

In 2023, Frankie Myers of the Yurok tribe wrote that since colonization began, natural resource extraction had devastated indigenous communities. This has led to a great mistrust of industry, so that when the offshore wind industry tells people about the great opportunities it will bring, native peoples remain sceptical. Further, during Yurok sacred ceremonies, mountain peaks are often used "which offer an unobstructed view of the ocean" and some of the last places that they can see the world as their ancestors had seen it. Yet the Yurok, traditional managers of their local ecosystem, had a lack of outreach from the corporations involved. In the future, tribal nations may decide to support offshore wind development, but that they "must be in leadership positions through every phase of the process". While offshore wind can help provide the clean energy America needs, unless the industry "truly engages with the Native American tribes that suffered the impacts from previous natural resource extraction, it will be as dirty as the rest of them."

On 6 March 2024, the Yurok Tribal Council voted to oppose offshore wind developments near the Yurok Coast. The Council gave several reasons on their Facebook page for this stance:

- "The 900-foot-tall offshore wind turbines will indelibly tarnish sacred cultural sites from the coast to the high country."
- "There is insufficient scientific research on the adverse environmental impacts associated with the massive floating wind turbines and platforms. The Tribe is gravely concerned about potential risks to the interlinked ecosystem extending from the deep ocean to the headwaters of the Klamath River."
- "The federal government has not recognized the Yurok Tribe's unceded ocean territory or its sovereign authority to determine whether and how this territory should be developed."

The Yurok join the Bear River Band and the Tolowa Dee-niʼ Nation in its opposition.

=== Forestry ===
In 1995, researchers observed that "control of reservation and allotment [of] natural resources has been withheld from them [Yurok people] under the auspices of scientific forest management." Managing the reservation for the benefit of the timber industry or a "fine stand of timber" prevented Yurok modes of subsistence. As such the researchers note that Yurok were divested from their forest resources for the following reasons: "by straightforward expropriation of their lands, as Yurok property rights were ignored and access to gathering sites was cut off; and through ecological change brought about by a shift in management regimes."

Forest management impacts forests on Yurok lands, since the environment is interconnected despite political boundaries. In United States forestry programs, Indigenous peoples are only given the right to "alienate the land but not to manage the vegetation." In the case of the Yurok, "vegetation management and Yurok culture and economy are closely linked" and as a result "the increasing unsuitability of the changed forest for Yurok subsistence helped push the Yurok to sell their land." The Yurok Fisheries Department works at reviving the streams and the runs of salmon and steelhead trout. Reforesting by tribal members helps to stabilize the banks of the waterways and reduce the sediment load.

On March 20, 2024, the Yurok began a first-of-its-kind land deal to manage tribal lands with the National Park Service under a memorandum of understanding between the tribe, Save the Redwoods League and Redwood National and State Parks. Sam Hodder, president and CEO of Save the Redwoods League, explained that the agreement would be starting a process of changing the present narrative about who, and for whom, natural lands are managed. The return of the 125 acres (51 ha) - named ʼO Rew by the Yurok - demonstrates "the sheer will and perseverance of the Yurok people". Joseph L. James, Yurok chairman, said: "Together, we are creating a new conservation model that recognizes the value of tribal land management". The Yurok see Redwoods as living beings and only used fallen trees to build their homes and canoes.

The land that will be co-managed was bought by the Save the Redwoods League in 2013 after having been a lumber mill for 50 years. Plans for ʼO Rew, originally one of dozens of villages on ancestral lands, include traditional redwood plank houses, a sweat house and a visitor and cultural center. The center will be displaying sacred artifacts from deerskins to baskets, as well as serving as a hub for the Yurok to carry out their traditions. Rosie Clayburn, the tribe's cultural resources said: "This is work that we've always done, and continued to fight for, but I feel like the rest of world is catching up right now and starting to see that Native people know how to manage this land the best".

In addition to conservation partnerships with Federally protected lands, the Yurok Tribe established a long-term partnership with the nonprofit Western Rivers Conservancy (WRC) in 2011 to finance and buy 47,097 acres (19,059 ha) along Blue Creek and the lower Klamath River from Green Diamond Resource Company. With land transfers completed in 2025, the area is protected as the Blue Creek Salmon Sanctuary and Yurok Tribal Community Forest. This adds more conserved lands in the Yurok traditional homelands that were not covered within the boundaries of the Tribe's reservation nor within any Federal or state forest lands. The Yurok Tribe is managing the lands to recover forests and riverine habitats that were used for decades by the timber industry.

== Language ==
The Yurok language, or Saaʼagochʼ / Saaʼagochehl, is one of two Algic languages spoken in California, the other being Wiyot. Between twenty and one hundred people speak the Yurok language today. The language is passed on through master-apprentice teams and through singing. Language classes have been offered through Cal Poly Humboldt and through annual language immersion camps.

An unusual feature of the language is that certain nouns change depending upon whether there is one, two, or three of the object. For instance, one human being would be ko꞉raʼ or koʼr, two human beings would be niʼiyel, and three human beings would be nahkseyt.

== Culture ==
=== Cuisine ===
19th century Yurok spoons

The Yurok traditionally fished for salmon (nepuy) along rivers, gathered ocean fish and shellfish, hunted game, and gathered plants. Yurok ate varied berries and meats, with whale meat being prized. Yuroks did not hunt whales, but waited until a drift whale washed up onto the beach or a place near the water and dried the flesh.

Salmon is the vital source of food and nutrients for the Yurok. Kaitlin Reed (Yurok/Hupa/Oneida) from California State Polytechnic University, Humboldt, described in 2014 the deep connection of salmon to the Yurok people and their identity: "Salmon are a gift from the Creator. Salmon are truly the essence of Yurok existence and foundational to Yurok identity for they would not exist without them."

Fish census from the late nineteenth and early twentieth centuries suggest an estimated 650,000 to 1 million adult salmon used to make the run from the mouth of the river to Upper Klamath Lake and beyond to spawn. Also, more than 100,000 spring-run Chinook would return each year. Yet, by August 2023, the Yurok salmon festival missed its basic ingredient - salmon. Because of the scarcity of salmon, the Yurok have been catalysed into "the need to fight for their main sources of nutrition and for their very way of life".

But with a changing climate, the salmon which were once plentiful now face a drastic decline in numbers linked to water quality and fish health. This poses a serious problem for the Yurok whose life and culture is closely tied with the fish of the Klamath and Trinity rivers. Yurok Tribal Chairman Joe James has said that if the salmon did not survive, neither would the tribe. With the removal of four dams along the Klamath river which will open up near 400 miles of historic salmon habitat, it is hoped that the fish will return. Yurok fisherman Oscar Gensaw said "Once the dams are down, the salmon will know what to do."

The Yurok are known globally for their arts that include basketry and regalia-making, and that salmon give the tribe the physical and mental strength for those arts. Tori McConnell, Miss Indian World 2023–2024, said that without salmon "we wouldn't have had the brainpower or the physical power to create and maintain and preserve the beautiful culture that we see today."

=== Material culture ===
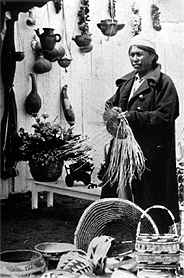
Yurok basketweaver

The major currency of the Yurok nations was the dentalium shell (terkwterm). Alfred L. Kroeber wrote of the Yurok perception of the shell: "Since the direction of these sources is 'downstream' to them, they speak in their traditions of the shells living at the downstream and upstream ends of the world, where strange but enviable peoples live who suck the flesh of univalves."

=== Condor restoration ===
California condors (Yurok: pregoneesh or prey-go-neesh) are understood as beings of great spiritual power by the Indigenous people in the Pacific Northwest and California. Yurok, Wiyot, and other tribes use the shed feathers in ceremonies to treat the sick. The Yurok Tribe Northern California Condor Restoration Program is working with the local Redwood National and State Parks to restore the California condor to the area where they were last spotted around 1892. The Bald Hills are part of the Yurok Tribal lands.

Due to the cultural and ecological importance of the condor, the tribe began a program in 2008 to reintroduce the condor. While based on the latest scientific protocols, Yurok Traditional Ecological Knowledge provided by the tribal elders informs the restoration program. In preparation, they have tested local wildlife for organochlorine pesticides such as DDT and for exposure to lead. They built a re-introduction and handling facility and received a clear Environment Impact Statement. An adult condor was brought in to mentor four juvenile birds who would be released. An adult not only serves as a role model but also enforces the social hierarchy that is crucial to the survival of a flock. Two condors were released in May 2022 from a pen in Redwood National Park. A third juvenile was released a few weeks later with the fourth being allowed outside the release pen in July. Each bird must leave the program area voluntarily after entering and exiting a staging pen with the birds being monitored for their safety by researchers who remain hidden in a repurposed shipping container. The staggered releases allow the social draw of still-captive condors to keep the freed birds nearby so the team can observe the birds, who are outfitted with GPS transmitters. As of March 2024 11 birds (4 females and 7 males) have been successfully introduced, with another 5 or more being released this year.

Yurok Tribe Song in Honor of Prey-go-neesh (Condor)

=== Sacred artifact repatriation ===
In 2010, 217 sacred artifacts were returned to the Yurok tribe by the Smithsonian Institution. The condor feathers, headdresses and deerskins had been part of the Smithsonian's collection for almost 100 years and represent one of the largest Native American repatriations. The regalia will be used in Yurok ceremonies and on display at the tribe's cultural center.

=== Spirituality/Religion ===
Yurok cosmology has been described as a "polytheistic monism", with various gods and spirits as a facet of the Great Spirit. "Evil" is said to come from imbalance, rather than there being evil spirits like Satan.

== Society ==
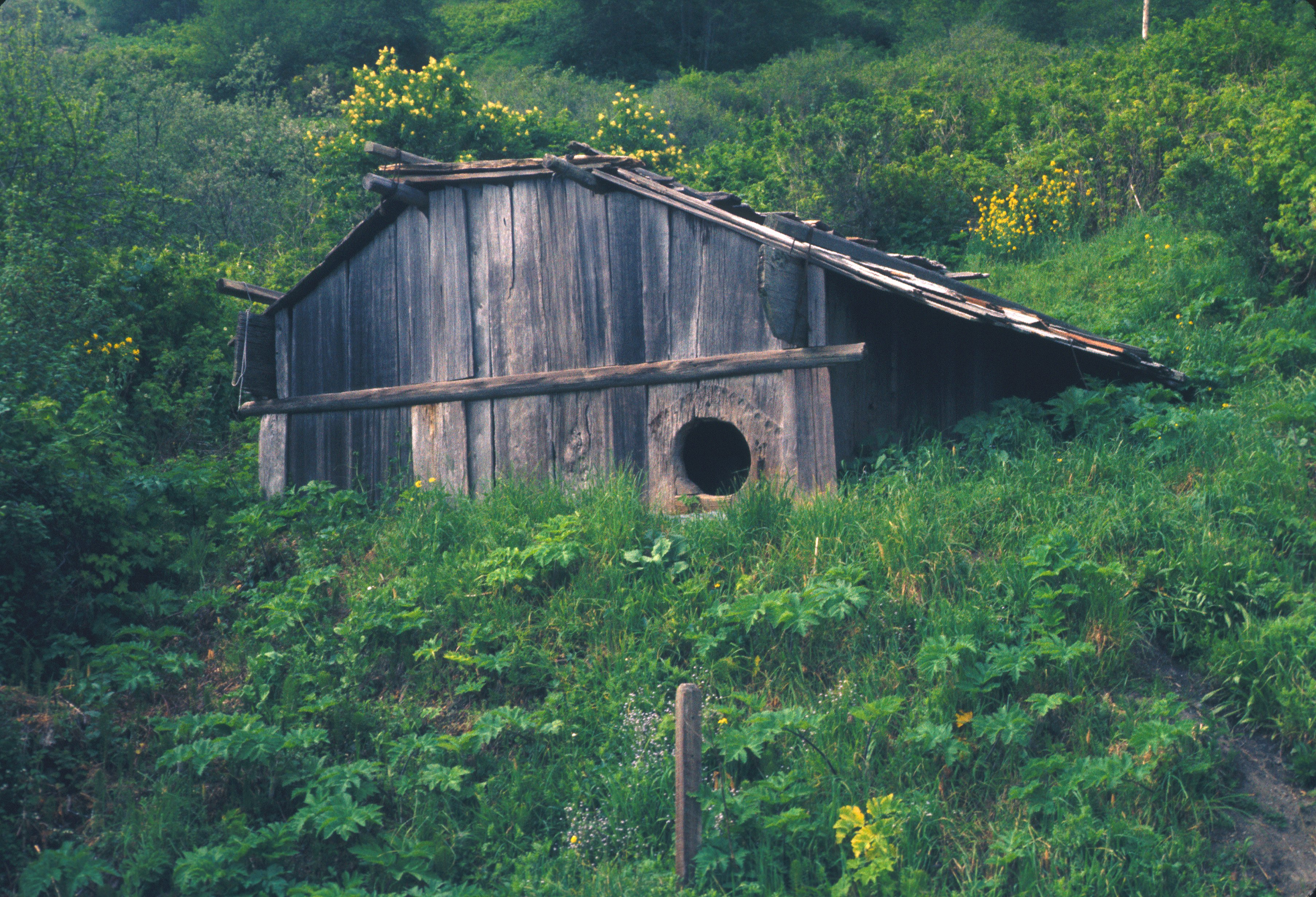
Reconstructed Yurok plankhouse in Redwood National Park

=== Villages ===
Yurok Villages (ʼoʼloolekw - "village") were composed of individual families that lived in separate, single-family homes. The house was owned by the eldest male and in each lived several generations of men related on their father's side of the family as well as their wives, children, daughters' husbands, unmarried relatives, and adopted kin. Yurok villages also consisted of sweat houses and menstrual huts. Sweat houses were designated for men of an extended patrilineal family as a place to gather. While during their menstruation cycles, women stayed in separate under-ground huts for ten days. Additionally, inheritance of land was predominantly patrilineal. The majority of the estate was passed down to the fathers' sons. Daughters and male relatives were also expected to acquire a portion of the estate.

=== Social organization ===
Yurok society had no chiefs, but in each village, a wealthy man known as a peyerk acted as leader, who was trained by elders. The peyerk's training would include a vision quest in which he would communicate with the natural environment and the spirit world. Peyerk from many villages came together to settle tribal disputes and also hosted tribal ceremonies. At these times, the peyerk would supply food and shelter for the Yurok people and special clothing for the dancers. Peyerk lived in homes at higher elevation, wore finer clothing, and sometimes spoke foreign languages.

Yurok medicine people were usually women. Women would become shamans after dreaming of being told to do so. Another shaman would then assist her in a ritual dance. Shamans would use plants, prayer, and rituals to heal people and also performed ceremonies to ensure successful hunting, fishing, and gathering.

Every year the Yurok came together for what was known as the World Renewal Ceremony, where songs and dances which had been passed on through many generations would be performed. Dancers would wear elaborate clothing for the occasion.

Some sources refer to it Yurok society as socially stratified because communities were divided between syahhlew ("rich"), waʼsʼoyowokʼ / waʼsoyowokʼ("poor"), and kaʼaal ("slaves"). The syahhlew were the only group allowed to perform religious duties. Furthermore, they had homes at higher elevations, wore nicer clothing, and spoke in a distinctive manner. The primary reason men became slaves was because they owed money to certain families. Nonetheless, slavery was not considered to be a significant institution. Overall, the higher a man's social ranking was, the more valuable his life was considered.

==== Marriage ====
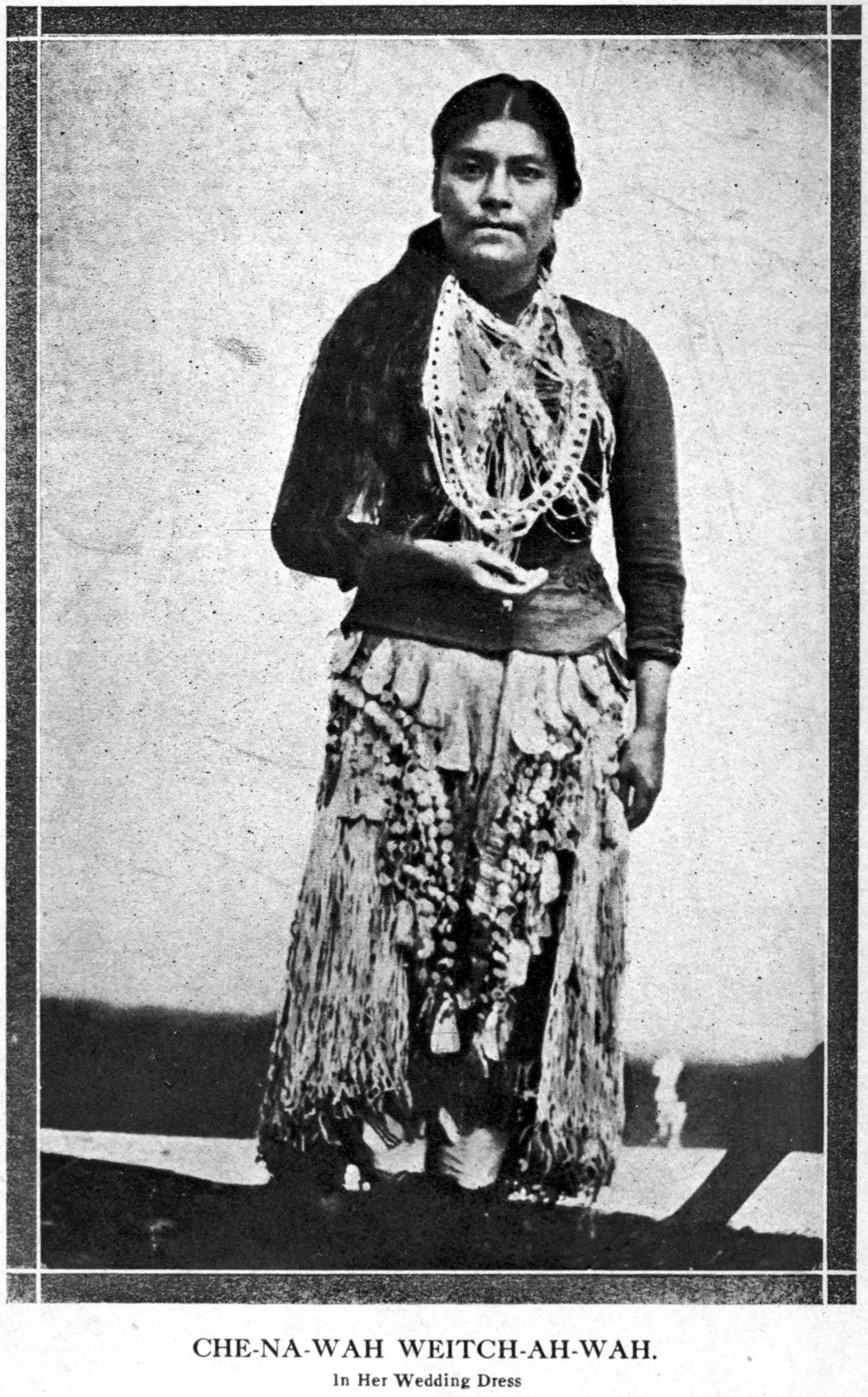
Yurok author Che-na-wah Weitch-ah-wah (Mrs. Lucy Thompson) in her wedding dress

When daughters got married, Yurok families would receive a payment from her husband. For the most part, girls were highly valued in the family. The amount of money paid by a man determined the social status of the couple. A wealthy man, who could afford to pay a large sum, increased the couple and their children's rank within the community. When married, both spouses held onto their personal properties but the bride lived with the groom's family and took his last name.

Men who were unable to pay the full sum of money could pay half the cost for the bride. In doing so, the couple was considered "half-married." Half-married couples lived with the bride's family and the groom would then become a slave for them. Furthermore, their children would take on the mother's last name. In cases of divorce, either spouse could initiate their split. The most frequent reason for divorce was if the wife was infertile. If the woman wanted a divorce and to take the children with her, her family had to refund the husband for his initial payment.

== Demographics ==
Estimates for the pre-contact populations of most native groups in California have varied substantially. Alfred L. Kroeber put the 1770 population of the Yurok at 2500. Sherburne F. Cook initially agreed, but later raised this estimate to 3100.

Historical population
| Year | Pop. | ±% |
|---|---|---|
| 1852 | 2,352 | — |
| 1895 | 900 | −61.7% |
| 1910 | 668 | −25.8% |
| 1920 | 2,430 | +263.8% |
| 2000 | 4,413 | +81.6% |

By 1870, the Yurok population had declined to 1350. By 1910 it was reported as 668 or 700.

There were 5,793 Yurok living throughout the United States. The Yurok Indian Reservation is California's largest tribe, with 6357 members as of 2019.

On November 24, 1993, the Yurok Tribe adopted a constitution that details the jurisdiction and territory of their lands. Under the Hoopa-Yurok Settlement Act of 1988, Pub. L. 100–580, qualified applicants had the option of enrolling in the Yurok Tribe. Of the 3,685 qualified applicants for the Settlement Roll, 2,955 people chose Yurok membership. 227 of those members had a mailing address on the Yurok reservation, but a majority lived within 50 miles of the reservation. The Yurok Tribe is currently the largest group of Native Americans in the state of California, with 6357 enrolled members living in or around the reservation. The Yurok reservation of 63,035 acres (25,509 ha) has an 80% poverty rate and 70% of the inhabitants do not have telephone service or electricity, according to the tribe's Web page.

== Notable people ==
- Abby Abinanti, California's first Native American lawyer
- Cutcha Risling Baldy, associate professor Cal Poly Humboldt
- Amy Bowers Cordalis, conservationist, fisher, lawyer
- Vivien Hailstone (Yurok/Karuk), basket maker, educator, activist
- Susan Masten, Yurok Tribe chairperson, NCAI director
- Coyote Park (Yurok/Karuk), artist
- Archie Thompson (1919–2013), elder who helped revitalize the Yurok language
- Lucy Thompson (1856–1932), first Indigenous Californian woman to be published

== See also ==
- Yurok traditional narratives
- Un-Dam the Klamath
- Restoration of the Elwha River
- Manifest destiny
