= Big Lagoon, California =

- census-designated place
- Location of Big Lagoon in Humboldt County, California.

- Location in California
- Coordinates: 41°09′37″N 124°08′01″W
- Country: United States
- State: California
- County: Humboldt

Area
  - Total: 0.61 sq mi (1.57 km^{2})
  - Land: 0.61 sq mi (1.57 km^{2})
  - Water: 0 sq mi (0.00 km^{2}) 0%
- Elevation: 56 ft (17 m)

Population (2020)
  - Total: 161
  - Density: 265.1/sq mi (102.34/km^{2})
- Time zone: UTC-8 (Pacific (PST))
  - Summer (DST): UTC-7 (PDT)
- GNIS feature IDs: 1658053; 2611424

Big Lagoon is a census-designated place in Humboldt County, California, United States, located 7 miles (11 km) north of Trinidad at an elevation of 56 feet (17 m). The population as of the 2020 census was 161, an increase from 93 in the 2010 census. The area covers .61 square miles (1.6 km^{2}), excluding water.

== Demographics ==
Historical population
Census	Pop.	Note	%±
2010	93		—
2020	161		73.1%
U.S. Decennial Census; 1850–1870 1880-1890; 1900 1910 1920; 1930 1940 1950; 1960 1970 1980; 1990 2000 2010

=== 2020 census ===
As of the 2020 census, Big Lagoon had a population of 161. The population density was 265.2 inhabitants per square mile (102.4/km^{2}). The age distribution of the population was 18.6% under the age of 18, 6.2% aged 18 to 24, 14.9% aged 25 to 44, 28.0% aged 45 to 64, and 32.3% who were 65 years of age or older. The median age was 54.3 years. For every 100 females there were 89.4 males, and for every 100 females age 18 and over there were 81.9 males age 18 and over.

0.0% of residents lived in urban areas, while 100.0% lived in rural areas.

There were 79 households in Big Lagoon, of which 19.0% had children under the age of 18 living in them. Of all households, 29.1% were married-couple households, 16.5% were cohabiting couple households, 20.3% were households with a male householder and no spouse or partner present, and 34.2% were households with a female householder and no spouse or partner present. About 36.7% of all households were made up of individuals and 15.2% had someone living alone who was 65 years of age or older. The average household size was 2.04, with 41 families (51.9% of all households).

There were 128 housing units at an average density of 210.9 units per square mile (81.4 units/km^{2}), of which 38.3% were vacant. Of the 79 occupied units, 57 (72.2%) were owner-occupied and 22 (27.8%) were renter-occupied. The homeowner vacancy rate was 0.0% and the rental vacancy rate was 25.8%.

Racial composition as of the 2020 census
Race	Number	Percent
White	93	57.8%
Black or African American	2	1.2%
American Indian and Alaska Native	51	31.7%
Asian	0	0.0%
Native Hawaiian and Other Pacific Islander	1	0.6%
Some other race	2	1.2%
Two or more races	12	7.5%
Hispanic or Latino (of any race)	25	15.5%

== Government ==
In the California State Legislature, Big Lagoon is in the 2nd senatorial district, represented by Democrat Mike McGuire, and the 2nd Assembly district, represented by Democrat Chris Rogers.

In the United States House of Representatives, Big Lagoon is in California's 2nd congressional district, represented by Democrat Jared Huffman.

== Education ==
Big Lagoon is served by the Big Lagoon Union Elementary School District and is home to the Big Lagoon School, a public K-8 school built in 1956, renovated in 1996 and now situated off U.S. Route 101 on 10 acres (4.0 ha) 26 miles (42 km) north of Eureka.
