= Cher-Ae Heights Indian Community of the Trinidad Rancheria =

Indian tribe in California, United States

Total population
- 154 enrolled tribal members, 73 rancheria population (2011)

Regions with significant populations
- United States (California)

Languages
- English

Related ethnic groups

The Cher-Ae Heights Indian Community of the Trinidad Rancheria is a federally recognized tribe with members who are descendants of Chetco, Hupa, Karuk, Tolowa, Wiyot, and Yurok people in Humboldt County, California. As of the 2010 Census the population was 132.

== Government ==
The Cher-Ae Heights Indian Community is headquartered in Trinidad, California. In 1961, the tribe organized under the Articles of Association. In June 2008, a new Constitution was ratified, replaced the Articles of Association. The tribe is governed by a democratically elected five-person community council. The current tribal administration is as follows.

- Chairman: Garth Sundberg
- Vice Chairman: Zack Brown
- Secretary / Treasurer: Trina Mathewson
- Council Member Seat #1: James Brown Jr.
- Council Member Seat #2: Robert Hemsted

== Reservation ==
Location of Trinidad Rancheria

The Trinidad Rancheria (Yurok: Chuerey; Tolowa: Tvm-sray-me’) (41°03′15″N 124°07′49″W) is a federally recognized ranchería occupying three parcels of land with a total area of over 80 acres (32 ha). in Humboldt County. It was established in 1906 to house homeless local California Indians. An additional 60 acres (24 ha) of land was purchased for the rancheria in 1908. The Rancheria's lands are within Yurok ancestral territory.

== Economic development ==
The Cher-Ae Heights Indian Community owns and operates the Cher-Ae Heights Casino, Sunrise Deli, Seascape Restaurant, Trinidad pier, Sunset Restaurant, Firewater Lounge, and all are located in Trinidad.

== Culture ==
The Cher-Ae Heights Indian Community of the Trinidad Rancheria is a Federally Recognized Indian Tribe. They are a tribe of historic Yurok Origin and have tribal member families who are direct lineal descendants of Yurok villages. They continue to practice their culture and preserve their language, and are actively involved in traditional ceremonies.

== Education ==
The Rancheria is served by the Trinidad Union Elementary School District and Northern Humboldt Union High School District.

== See also ==
- Indigenous peoples of California
