= Traditional Alaska Native medicine =

Alternative/complementary medical practice based on Native-Alaskan tradition

Traditional Alaska Native medicine is a cultural style of healing that has been passed down from one generation of Alaska Native peoples to the next and is based on success over time and oral tradition. In contrast to an allopathic or western view of medicine, traditional Alaska Native medicine believes that illness stems from an individual's disharmony with the environment and healing must therefore begin in the person's spirit.

== Food ==
=== Seal ===
Seal oil, whale oil, and the meats of these animals are the predominant healing substances used by members of the Inuit culture. These substances are believed to provide warmth which is a condition of health to this culture as warmth is the essence of well-being. Seal is used preventatively by hunters who eat the animal's meat before going on a hunt to increase endurance and ward off weakness, hypothermia, and frostbite. The oils and meat are also used to prevent depression and other diseases of the soul. Medicinally and as a remedy, seal is used as a treatment for ear infections, gastrointestinal disturbances, nausea, headache, fractures, lice, skin rashes, and acne.

=== Wild berries ===
Alaska Natives traditionally harvest a variety of wild berries as general food consumption, but the berries also play a significant role in health as well. Salmon berries, which are similar to raspberries, have been used for wound healing and as gynecological aids; the leaves and stems of blackberries are used to treat diarrhea and to counter kidney trouble; and highbush and bog blueberries are used topically and orally as medicines. The high antioxidant activity in wild berries also helps to reduce the risk of diabetes, heart disease, cognitive decline and cancer.

== Plants ==
=== Devil's club ===
The Tlingit culture is known for using devil's club for a variety of ailments. The weed can be turned into tea, mashed into a salves, chewed, and steamed to help with illnesses such as colds, coughs, stomach problems, tuberculosis, hypoglycemia, cancer, depression, broken bones, congestion, and inflammation. The Tlingit consider devil's club to be "strong medicine" due to its effects on the psycho-pharma-spiritual aspects.

=== Willow trees ===
One commonly known medicinal benefit from the willow tree is the use of its bark. Alaska Natives and other Native American tribes have used the bark from the Willow tree as a pain killer. In fact, the bark does contain acetylsalicylic acid which is now called aspirin and has been commercialized as an over the counter pain killer. The willow tree's leaves can also be used in a poultice or bath to ease skin infections or irritations and, when turned into an ash, can be sprinkled on severe burns to prevent cuts from becoming infected.

=== Dandelions ===
Each part of the dandelion can and has been used by Native Alaskans and other Native Americans for medicinal use. It is rich in a variety of vitamins (A, B, C, and D) and minerals and helps with liver issues such as hepatitis and jaundice as well as being a natural diuretic and laxative. The root of the weed is also used as a caffeine substitute.

== Types of healers ==
=== Shamans ===
Shamans are religious and spiritual leaders who are considered "magico-religious." This is due to their ability to heal severe conditions that border on supernatural origin and cannot be tended to by traditional remedies. Shamans differ from traditional healers in that these individuals possess the ability to travel by trance to other realms in search of answers to a person's illness. They also take on a variety of roles within their community including healers, magicians, politicians, psychologists, predictors of weather and good hunts, priests, social workers, and mystics.

=== Traditional healers ===
Traditional healers deal with everyday forms of illness or injury and can include herbalists, surgeons, massage specialists, midwives, or medicine men and women. What sets traditional Alaska Native healers apart from western doctors is both their traditional methods as well as the source of their healing abilities. Both shamans and traditional healers receive their gift of healing from a stronger spiritual source which communicates to them through visions or dreams, consciousness-altering illness, or apprenticeship to another healer.

== Organizations ==
=== Southcentral Foundation ===
Southcentral Foundation is an Alaska Native health care organization that serves Alaska Native and American Indian people who live in Anchorage, the Matanuska-Susitna Valley, and 55 rural villages across the state of Alaska. The organization focuses on physical, mental, emotional, and spiritual wellness and emphasizes the importance of culture as well as provides access to traditional healing services. The organization also has a Traditional Healing Clinic in which tribal doctors take a traditional approach to healing and offer services such as traditional counseling, traditional physical (including healing hands and healing touch), and a women's talking circle. The clinic also has an Alaska Native traditional healing garden in which plants that have been used for medicinal use for generations are grown.

=== Alaska Native Tribal Health Consortium ===
The Alaska Native Tribal Health Consortium is a Tribal health organization that serves Alaska Native and American Indian people who live in the state of Alaska. The organization provides a variety of services including comprehensive medical services at the Alaska Native Medical Center, wellness programs, disease research and prevention, rural provider training and rural water and sanitation systems construction. The organization also focuses on traditional approaches to wellness and food sources.

== Sources ==
Retrieved from https://link.springer.com/article/10.1007%2Fs10393-011-0707-9
