= Alaska Pacific University =

Private university in Anchorage, Alaska, US

- Former name: Alaska Methodist University (1957-78)
- Type: Private university
- Established: 1957; 69 years ago
- Religious affiliation: United Methodist Church
- Academic affiliations: IAMSCU; Eco League; Alaska Native Tribal Health Consortium; Space-grant
- President: Janelle Vanasse
- Students: 578 (Fall 2023)
- Undergraduates: 437 (Fall 2023)
- Postgraduates: 141 (Fall 2023)
- Location: Anchorage, Alaska, United States; 61.1893°N 149.8042°W
- Campus: Urban
- Website: www.alaskapacific.edu

Alaska Pacific University (APU) is a private university in Anchorage, Alaska, United States. It was established as Alaska Methodist University in 1957. Although it was renamed to Alaska Pacific University in 1978, it is still affiliated with the United Methodist Church. The main campus is located adjacent to the University of Alaska Anchorage (UAA) and the Alaska Native Medical Center.

== Rankings ==
Academic rankings

Baccalaureate
- Washington Monthly: 30

Regional
- U.S. News & World Report: 42-45

In 2024, Washington Monthly ranked Alaska Pacific University 30th among 223 colleges that award almost exclusively bachelor's degrees in the U.S. based on its contribution to the public good, as measured by social mobility, research, and promoting public service.

== History ==
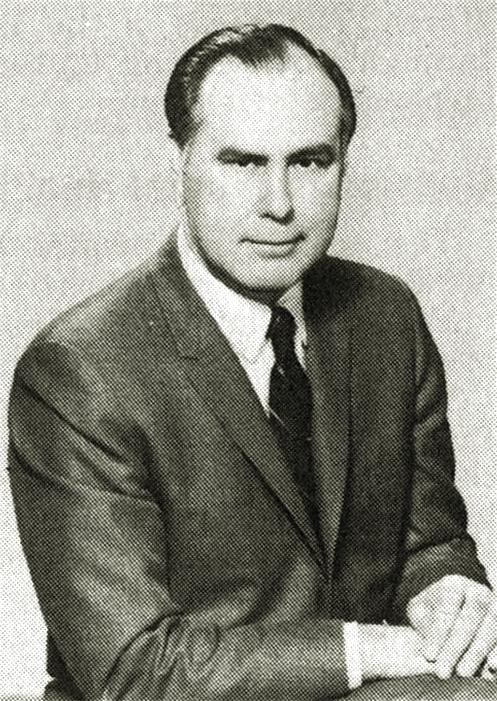
Frederick P. McGinnis was the university's first president.

The university was founded in the late 1950s as Alaska Methodist University by Peter Gordon Gould, an Aleut from Unga, Alaska. Gould became the first Alaska Native minister in the United Methodist Church later in life, and used his position to campaign for the development of a Methodist University in Alaska.

Alaska Methodist University dedicated its campus on June 28, 1959. In April 1958, Donald F. Ebright was elected as the university's first administrative president. Frederick P. McGinnis was elected in 1960, and served as acting president to the first class of students to attend the university. Approximately 900 acres of land destined to become the site of the APU Kellogg Campus was acquired in 1973 from the DeWolf-Kellogg Trust.

In November 1978 Alaska Methodist University was renamed Alaska Pacific University. In 2016, APU formed a partnership with the Alaska Native Tribal Health Consortium, indicating an intention to become a tribal college.

== Academics ==
Undergraduates can pursue liberal arts and sciences programs. APU offers nine graduate programs, eight master's degrees and one doctoral degree. There are also several graduate certificate options. APU also offers a professional studies programs for non-traditional students.

The Early Honors program functions as an alternative to the senior year in high school.

=== International collaboration ===
The Alaska Pacific University is an active member of the University of the Arctic. UArctic is an international cooperative network based in the Circumpolar Arctic region, consisting of more than 200 universities, colleges, and other organizations with an interest in promoting education and research in the Arctic region.

The university also participates in UArctic's mobility program north2north. The aim of that program is to enable students of member institutions to study in different parts of the North.

== Campus ==
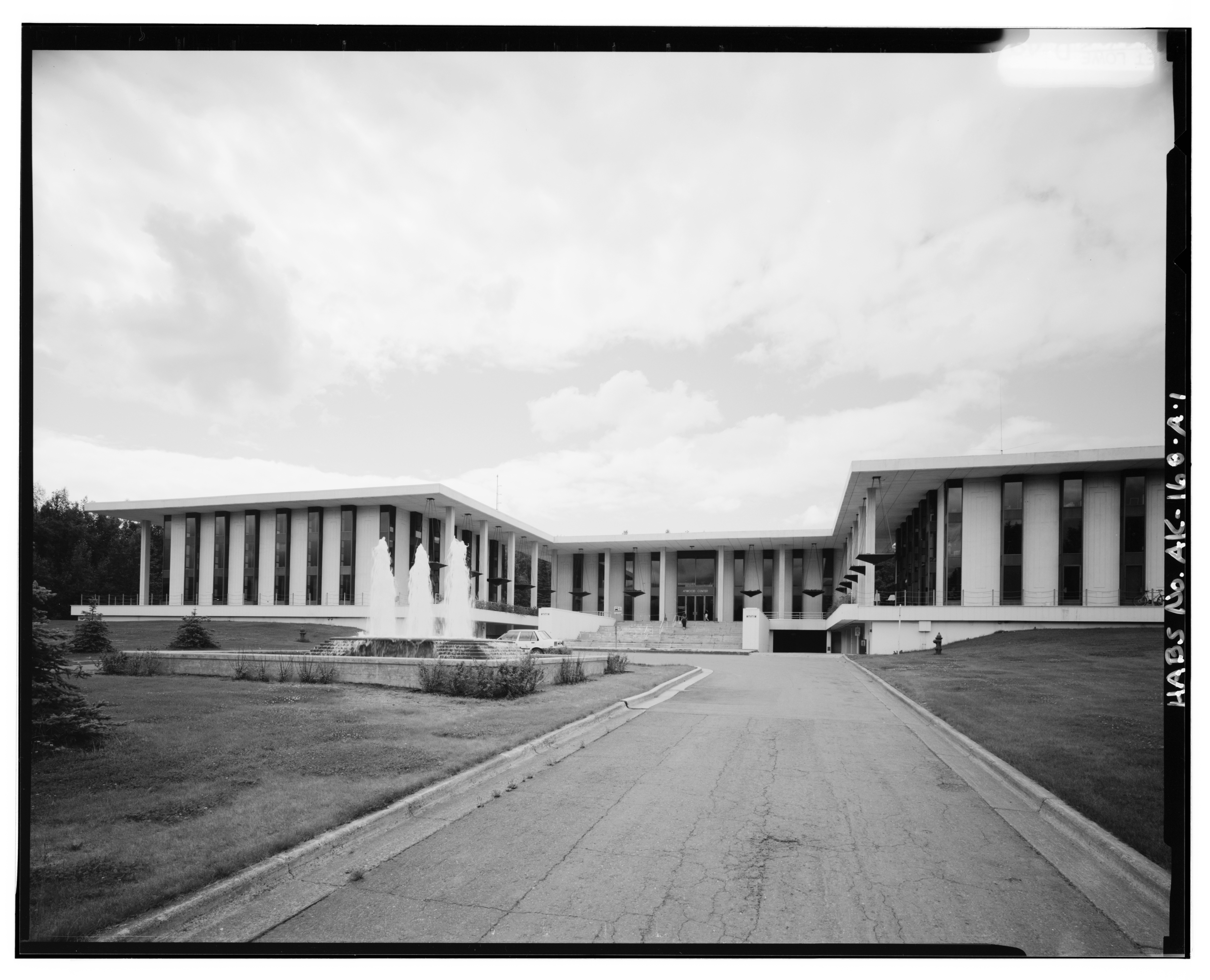
The Atwood Campus Center houses the university's student union plus dormitories.

The main campus includes academic facilities, residence halls, community gathering spaces, recreational facilities, and winter and summer recreational trails. The campus consists of eight major buildings, with five of them currently utilized directly by the university. The three other buildings on the main campus are offices for the US Geological Survey's Alaska Volcano Observatory, Alaska Public Media, and the Alaska Spine Institute. There are multiple housing accommodations on the main campus, divided by class year designations. All incoming freshmen under 21 years of age are required to live on campus for their first two years.

The Atwood Center is listed on the National Register of Historic Places as the location (along with North and South Atwood) of a major conference of Alaska Natives at the time of the passage of the Alaska Native Claims Settlement Act in 1971.

APU has an extension of its campus in Palmer, Alaska, known as the Kellogg Campus. It functions as a 700-acre working farm for students of the sustainability program, as well as an environmental learning center for home-schooled students.

== Student life ==
=== Athletics ===
Alaska Pacific University is known for its Nordic Ski Team. The APU Nordic Ski Center (APUNSC) was established in 1999 as a regional Olympic training center for cross-country skiers.

Alaska Methodist University's ski team sent four skiers to the 1972 Winter Olympics; AMU/APU has sent at minimum one skier to every winter Olympics after 1972, including Kikkan Randall who became a gold medalist in the cross-country skiing event at the 2018 Winter Olympics.

=== Clubs and associations ===
Associated Students of Alaska Pacific University (ASAPU) is the elected body for student government. ASAPU members represent student interests and oversee student clubs and organizations. APU has an assortment of student clubs and organizations with which students can affiliate themselves.

In the Residence Halls, the Resident Activity Programming Board hosts events for students who live on campus.

== Notable alumni ==
- Sadie Bjornsen, cross-country skier (Olympian in 2014 and 2018)
- Holly Brooks, former cross-country skier (Olympian in 2010 and 2014)
- Sharon Cissna, member of the Alaska House of Representatives
- Lew Freedman, author, sports writer and columnist at Anchorage Daily News
- Katherine Gottlieb, President & CEO of Southcentral Foundation
- Albert Kookesh, former member of the Alaska Senate and Tlingit community leader
- Walt Monegan, former police chief of Anchorage and former Alaska Commissioner of Public Safety
- Kikkan Randall, cross-country skier (Olympian in 2006 and 2018; gold medal winner in 2018)
- Josh Revak, Purple Heart recipient and member of the Alaska State Senate
- Scott Stephens, vocalist for Liquid Blue
- Rosita Worl, president of the Sealaska Heritage Institute
