= Alaska Federal Health Care Access Network =

Tribal health care organization

The Alaska Federal Health Care Access Network (AFHCAN) is managed by the Alaska Native Tribal Health Consortium (ANTHC). ANTHC is a tribal organization, as defined in 25 U.S.C. 450(b)(c) and, along with the Southcentral Foundation, jointly manages and operates the Alaska Native Medical Center (ANMC), provides tertiary and specialty healthcare services in Alaska, United States.

The Alaska Federal Healthcare Access Network (AFHCAN) offers a diagnostic “store and forward” telehealth platform with the ability to create a telemedicine case with textual information and data from biomedical peripherals, and send data for consultation. Health care professionals are able to view the data and respond to the case using a standard PC workstation.

Telehealth connects approximately 180 Alaska Native community village clinics, 25 subregional clinics, 4 multiphysician health centers, 6 regional hospitals, and the Alaska Native Medical Center in Anchorage. Approximately 75 percent of the AFHCAN's telehealth usage is for primary care services. Through growing acceptance of telehealth, more than 700 users in Alaska continually provide feedback and request new products and features. As a part of its mission, AFHCAN continues to review, develop, and deploy new telehealth technologies.
