= Katherine Gottlieb =

American businesswoman

- Education: Alaska Pacific University
- Awards: MacArthur Fellows Program
- Scientific career
- Fields: health care

Katherine Gottlieb was the president and CEO of the Southcentral Foundation, an Alaska Native Healthcare Organization.

== Life ==
She graduated from Alaska Pacific University with a Bachelor of Arts degree, a master's degree in business administration, and an honorary doctorate.

Southcentral Foundation's Nuka system of health care grew from fewer than 100 employees to more than 2,000; and from an operating budget of about $3 million to $323 million. Funding for SCF is 45 percent from the Indian Health Service, 50 percent from third party insurers or Medicaid, and the remaining 5 percent from foundation or grants. Gottlieb resigned from her position at SCF on August 3, 2020, two weeks after the organization fired three dentists, including her husband Kevin Gottlieb for falsifying health records.

== Awards ==
- 2015 Baldrige Foundation Harry S. Hertz Leadership Award
- 2004 MacArthur Fellows Program
