= Culture of the Tlingit =

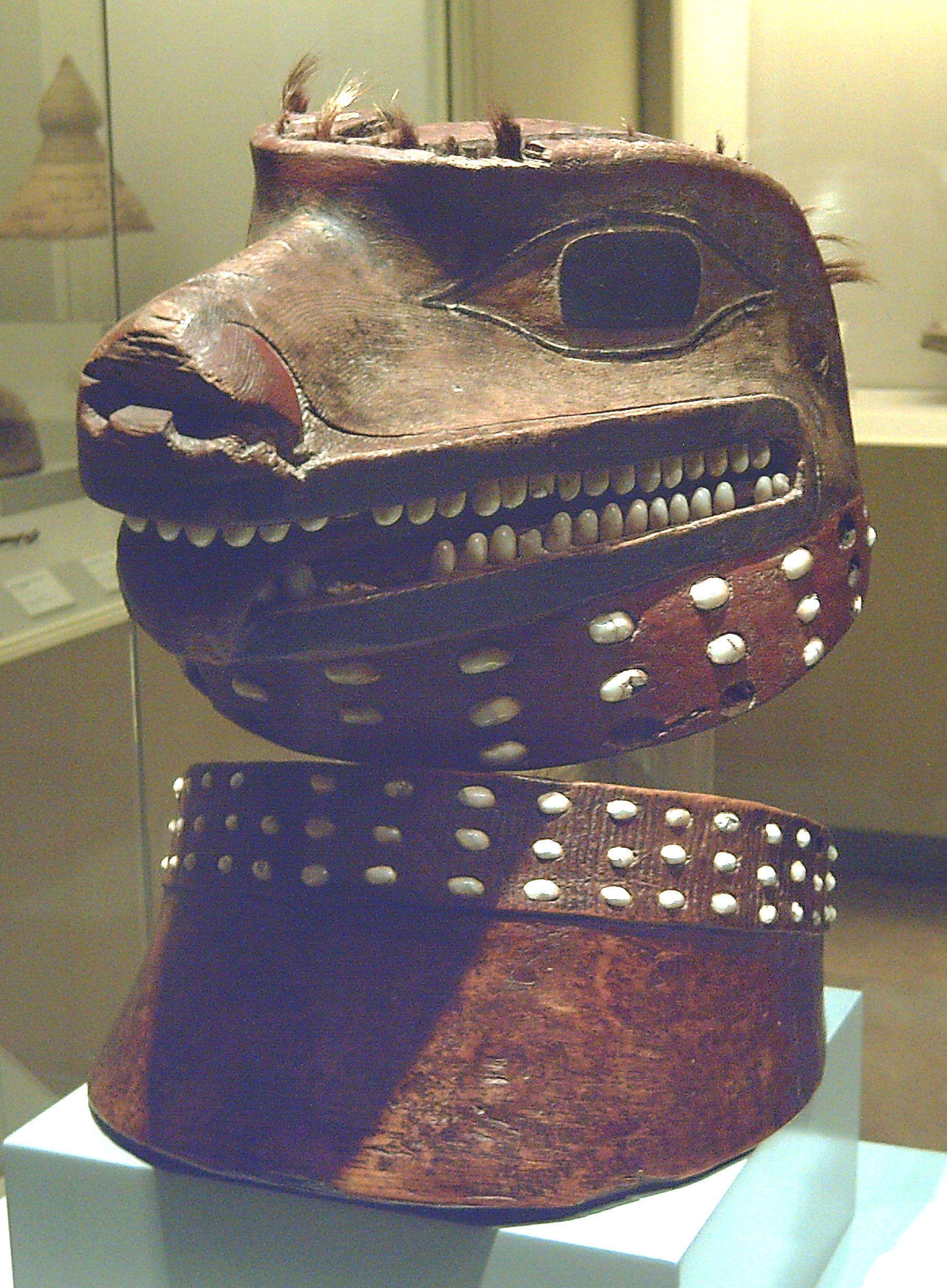
18th century Tlingit art: A helmet representing the head of a wolf.(Museum of the Americas, Madrid, Spain).

The culture of the Tlingit, an Indigenous people from Alaska, British Columbia, and the Yukon, is multifaceted, a characteristic of Northwest Coast peoples with access to easily exploited rich resources. In Tlingit culture a heavy emphasis is placed upon family and kinship, and on a rich tradition of oratory. Wealth and economic power are important indicators of status, but so is generosity and proper behavior, all signs of "good breeding" and ties to aristocracy. Art and spirituality are incorporated in nearly all areas of Tlingit culture, with even everyday objects such as spoons and storage boxes decorated and imbued with spiritual power and historical associations.

== Kinship ==
The Tlingit kinship system, like most Northwest Coast societies, is based on a matrilineal structure, and describes a family roughly according to Morgan's Crow system of kinship. The society is wholly divided into two distinct moieties, termed Raven (Yéil) and Eagle/Wolf (Ch'aak'/Ghooch). The former identifies with the raven as its primary crest, but the latter is variously identified with the wolf, the eagle, or some other dominant animal crest depending on location; occasionally this moiety is simply called the "not Raven" people. There is a general tendency among younger Tlingits of identifying all Eagle/Wolf clans with eagle in preference to wolf or other crests, something deprecated by most elders but reinforced by modern associations between Tlingit and their Tsimshian and Haida neighbors. Members of one moiety traditionally may only marry a person of the opposite moiety, however in the last century this system began to break down (as a result of violent suppression of Tlingit culture and traditions) and today so-called "double-eagle" and "double-raven" marriages are common, as well as marriages with non-Tlingit people. No word in Tlingit refers to moiety, since referring to a particular person by their clan membership (see below) is enough to determine their moiety affiliation. In colloquial English the term "side" is often used among the Tlingit since "moiety" is a specialized term unfamiliar to most. Moiety means "half" in the French language, denoting that half of the clans are Eagle and half are Raven.

The moieties provide the primary dividing line across Tlingit society, but identification is rarely made with the moiety. Instead individuals identify with their matrilineal clan (naa), a large group of people related by shared genealogy, history, and possessory rights. Clan sizes vary widely, and some clans are found throughout all the Tlingit lands whereas others are found only in one small cluster of villages. The Tlingit clan functions as the main property owner in the culture, thus almost all formal property amongst the Tlingit belongs to clans, not to individuals. Due to the decline in traditional knowledge among the younger generations (as a result of violent suppression of Tlingit culture and traditions), many young urban Tlingit people are uncertain of their exact clan affiliation, and may simply refer to themselves by one or the other moiety. If they become more familiar with traditional cultural practice they either discover and research their clan or are formally adopted into an appropriate clan in the area.

Because of the heavy emphasis on clan and matrilineal descent, the father played a relatively minor role in the lives of his children. Instead, what Europeans would consider the father's primary role was filled by the mother's brother, the children's maternal uncle, who was of the same clan as the children. This man served as caretaker, teacher, and disciplinarian. The father had a more peripheral relationship with the children, and as such many Tlingit children have very pleasant memories of their fathers as generous and playful, while they maintain a distinct fear and awe of their maternal uncles who exposed them to hard training and discipline.

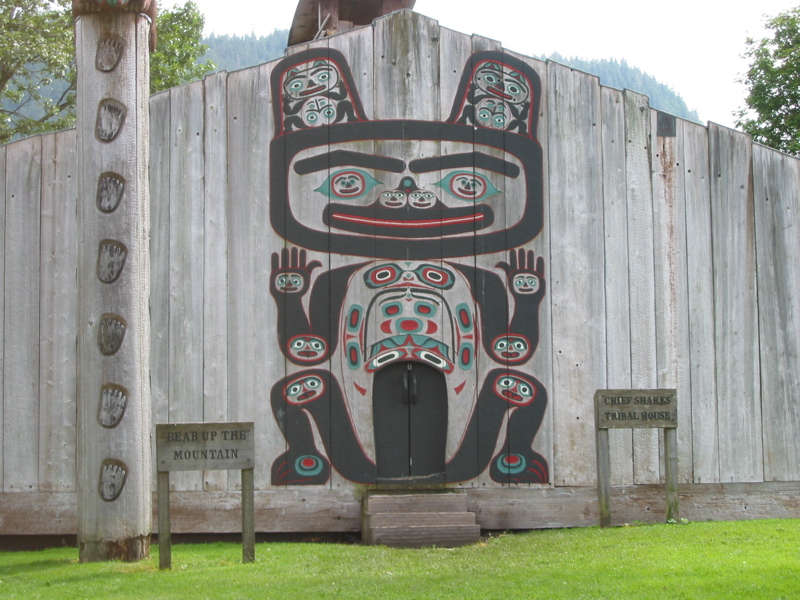
Chief Shakes Tribal House, a traditionally constructed Tlingit house in Wrangell, Alaska

Beneath the clans are houses (hít), smaller groups of people closely related by family, and who in earlier times lived together in the same large communal house. The physical house itself would be first and foremost property of the clan, but the householders would be keepers of the house and all material and non-material goods associated with it. Each house was led by a "chief," in Tlingit hít s'aatí "house master", an elder male of high stature within the family. Hít s'aatí who were recognized as being of particularly high stature in the community, to the point of being major community leaders, were called aan s'aatí or more often aankháawu, "village master" or "village leader". The term aan s'aatí is now used to refer to an elected city mayor in Tlingit, although the traditional position was not elected and did not imply some coercive authority over the residents.

The existence of a "chief" for every house lineage in a village confused many early European explorers and traders who expected a single autocratic "chief" in a given village or region. This led to numerous confrontations and skirmishes among the Europeans and Tlingit in early history, since a particular "chief" could only hold sway over members of his own household and not over others in the village. A high stature hít s'aatí could convince unrelated villagers to behave a certain way, but if he lost significant status the community would begin to ignore him, much to the dismay of Europeans who were depending on his authority.

The hít s'aatí is usually the caretaker and administrator of house property, as well as some or most clan property in his region. He may often refer to himself as the "slave" of clan and house valuables and regalia because his position is not one of true ownership. Instead the position is more like that of a museum curator, one who has some say in whether or not a particular item is to be used or displayed, but who does not truly own that item and who may not dispense with it, sell it, or destroy it without the consultation of other family members. The hít s'aatí is also responsible for seeing the clan regalia brought out regularly at potlatches where the value and history of these items may be reconfirmed through ceremonial use and payments to the opposite clans. The funds for these potlatches may come primarily from the hít s'aatí, and as such the regalia that represent his ancestors can be seen as spending his money for him.

Historically, marriages among Tlingits, and occasionally between Tlingits and other tribes were arranged. The man moved into the woman's house and became a member of that household. He contributed to communal food gathering and had access to his wife's clan's resources. Because the children were of the mother's clan, marriages were often arranged such that the man married a woman of the same clan as his father, though not a close relation. This constituted an ideal marriage in traditional Tlingit society, where the children were of the same clan as their paternal grandfather and could thus inherit his wealth, prestige, names, occupation, and personal possessions.

Because often the grandparents, particularly grandfathers, had a minimal role in the upbringing of their own children, they took an active interest in the upbringing of their grandchildren, and are noted for doting upon them beyond reason. This is usually exemplified by the story of Raven stealing daylight from his putative grandfather, who gave him the moon and the stars, and despite losing both of them to Raven's treachery, gave him the sun as well simply because he was a favored grandchild.

Any Tlingit is a member of a clan, be it by birth or adoption. Many Tlingits are children of another clan, the clan of their fathers. The relationship between father and child is warm and loving, and this relationship has a strong influence on the relation between the two clans. During times of grief or trouble the Tlingit can call on his father's clan for support at least as much as he can call on his own. His father's clan is not obliged to help him, but the familial connection can be strong enough to alienate two clans in the same moiety. This situation is well documented in oral history, where two clans of opposite moieties are opposed in war—one clan may call upon a related clan of the same moiety for assistance only to be refused because of a father's child among its enemies.

The opposition of clans is also a motivator for the reciprocal payments and services provided through potlatches. Indeed, the institution of the potlatch is largely founded on the reciprocal relationship between clans and their support during mortuary rituals. When a respected Tlingit dies the clan of his father is sought out to care for the body and manage the funeral. His own clan is incapable of these tasks due to grief and spiritual pollution. The subsequent potlatches are occasions where the clan honors its ancestors and compensates the opposite clans for their assistance and support during trying times. This reciprocal relationship between two clans is vital for the emotional, economic, and spiritual health of a Tlingit community.

== Property ==
In Tlingit society, many things are considered property that in other societies would not be. This includes names, stories, speeches, songs, dances, landscape features (e.g., mountains), and artistic designs. These notions of property are similar to those described by modern intellectual property law. More familiar property objects are buildings, rivers, totem poles, berry patches, canoes, and works of art. The Tlingit have long felt powerless to defend their cultural properties against depredation by opportunists, but have in recent years become aware of the power of American and Canadian law in defending their property rights and have begun to prosecute people for willful theft of such things as clan designs.

In modern Tlingit society two forms of property are extant. The first and foremost is unavoidably that of the American and Canadian cultures, and is rooted in European law. The other is the Tlingit concept of property as described here. The two are contradictory in terms of rightful ownership, inheritance, permanence, and even in the very idea of what can be owned. This is the cause of many disagreements both within the Tlingit and with outsiders, as both concepts can seem to be valid at the same time. The Tlingit apply the indigenous concept of property mostly in ceremonial circumstances, such as after the death of an individual, the construction of clan houses, erection of totem poles, etc. The situation of death can be problematic however since Tlingit law dictates that any personal property reverts to clan ownership in the absence of any clan descendants who can serve as caretakers. This, of course, contradicts European legal interpretation, under which property reverts to the state in the absence of legal heirs. However, the two may be considered to be consistent, in that the clan serves as the essence of a Tlingit concept of state. Obviously such matters require careful consideration by both Tlingit familiar with the traditional laws and by the governments involved.

Myriad art forms are considered property in Tlingit culture. The idea of copyright applied to Tlingit art is inappropriate, since copyright is generally restrictive to particular works or designs. In Tlingit culture, the ideas behind artistic designs are themselves property, and their representation in art by someone who cannot prove ownership is an infringement upon the property rights of the proprietor.

Stories are considered property of particular clans. Some stories are shared freely but are felt to belong to a particular clan, other stories are clearly felt to be restricted property and may not be shared without a clan member's permission. Certain stories are however essentially felt to be in the public domain, such as many of the humorous tales in the Raven cycle. The artistic representation of characters or situations from stories that are known property of certain clans is an infringement on the clan's property rights to that story.

Songs are also considered to be property of clans, however since songs are more frequently composed than stories, a clear connection to individuals is felt until that individual dies, at which point the ownership tends to revert to the clan. A number of children's songs or songs sung to children, commonly called 'lullabies', are considered to be in the public domain. However, any song written with a serious intent, be it a love song or a song of mourning, is considered to be the sole property of the owner and may not be sung, recorded, or performed without that clan's permission.

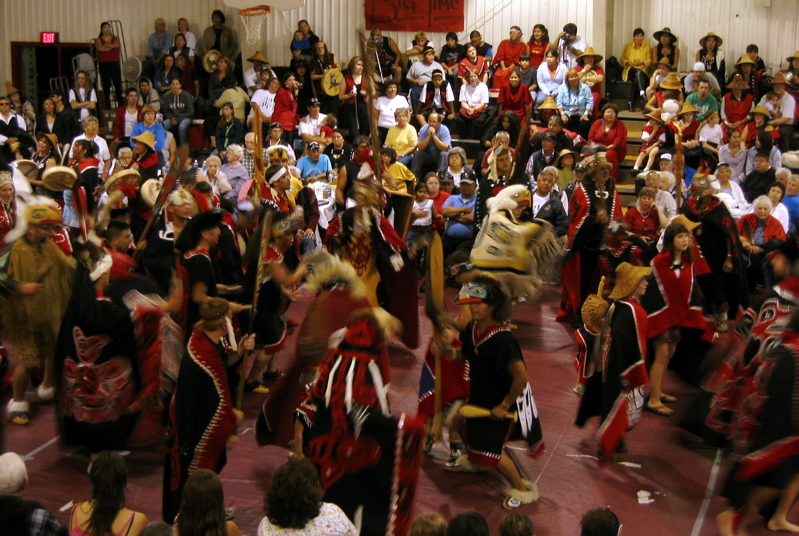
A large group dancing at a totem pole raising celebration in Klawock, Alaska, 2005

Dances are also considered to be clan property, along the same lines as songs. Since people from different clans are often involved in the performance of a dance, it is considered essential that before the dance is performed or the song sung that a disclaimer be made regarding who permission was obtained from, and with whom the original authorship or ownership rests.

Names are property of a different kind. Most names are inherited, that is they are taken from a deceased relative and applied to a living member of the same clan. However, children are not necessarily given an inherited name while young, instead being given one that seems appropriate to the child, recalls an interesting event in the child's life, or is simply made up on the spot. These names, lacking a strong history, are not considered as important as those that have passed through many generations, so they are not as carefully defended. Also, some names are 'stolen' from a different clan to make good on an unpaid obligation or debt, and returned when the debt is paid or else passed down through the new clan until it can make a stable claim to ownership of the name.

Places and resources are also considered property, though in a much less clearly defined way than is found in the European legal tradition. Locations are not usually clearly bounded in the Tlingit world, and although sometimes certain landmarks serve as clear boundary markers, ownership of places is usually correlated with a valuable resource in that location rather than overt physical characteristics. Usually the resources in question are food sources, such as salmon streams, herring spawning grounds, berry patches, and fishing holes. However, they are not always immediately apparent, such as the ownership of mountain passes by some clans, which is due to exclusive trading relationships with Athabascans who live in lands accessible by those passes.

Although clan ownership of places is nearly complete in the Tlingit world, with the entirety of Southeast Alaska being divided up into a patchwork of bays, inlets, and rivers belonging to particular clans, this does not in practice provide much of an obstacle to food harvest and travel. Reciprocal relationships between clans guarantee permission for free harvest in most areas to nearly any individual. Since the level of inter-clan disagreements has declined, the attitude towards resource ownership is at a point where few persecute trespass into clan areas, as long as the individuals involved show respect and restraint in their harvest. Note that this only pertains to relations within Tlingit society, and not to relations with the American and Canadian governments or with non-Tlingit individuals.

A hereditary form of slavery was practiced extensively among the Tlingit peoples. As many as one third of people in Tlingit society were enslaved.

== Potlatch ==
Potlatches (Tl. koo.éex' ) were held for deaths, births, naming, marriages, sharing of wealth, raising totems, special events, honoring the leaders or the departed.

The memorial potlatch is a major feature of Tlingit culture. A year or two following a person's death this potlatch was held to restore the balance of the community. Members of the deceased's family were allowed to stop mourning. If the deceased was an important member of the community, like a chief or a shaman for example, at the memorial potlatch his successor would be chosen. Clan members from the opposite moiety took part in the ritual by receiving gifts and hearing and performing songs and stories. The function of the memorial potlatch was to remove the fear from death and the uncertainty of the afterlife.

Burning food in potlatches was thought to "feed" new totem poles.

== Art ==
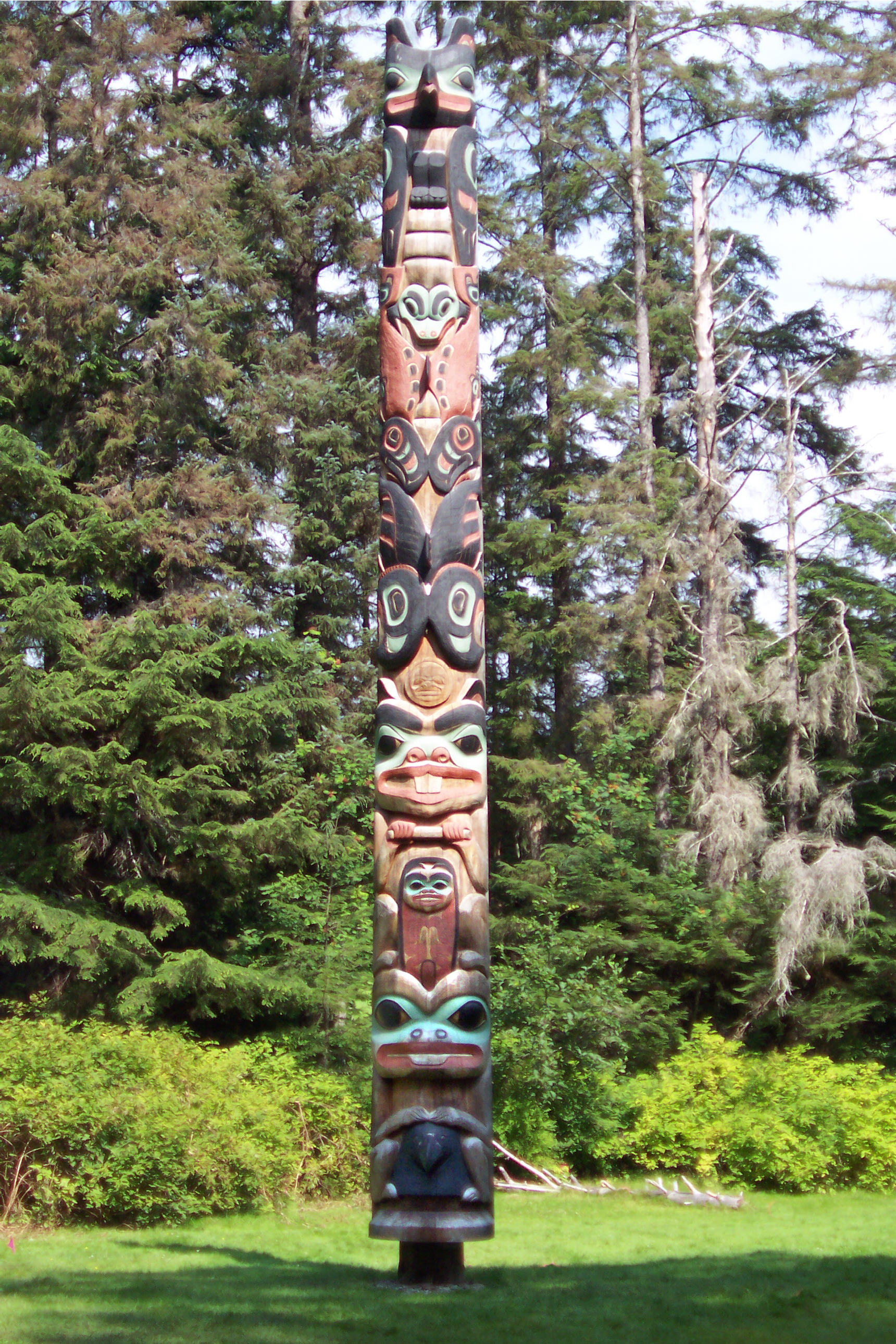
The K'alyaan Totem Pole of the Tlingit Kiks.ádi Clan, erected at Sitka National Historical Park to commemorate the lives lost in the 1804 Battle of Sitka.

=== Totem poles ===
The Tlingit carve crests on totem poles made of cedar trees. The totem poles carved normally tell a story, and Tlingit artists carve subjects like animals into the totem poles. These pictures are aligned in a column down the pole, in order from top to bottom.

The poles are put on outside corners of "traditional dwellings", used to structurally support their interiors, or placed on shores.

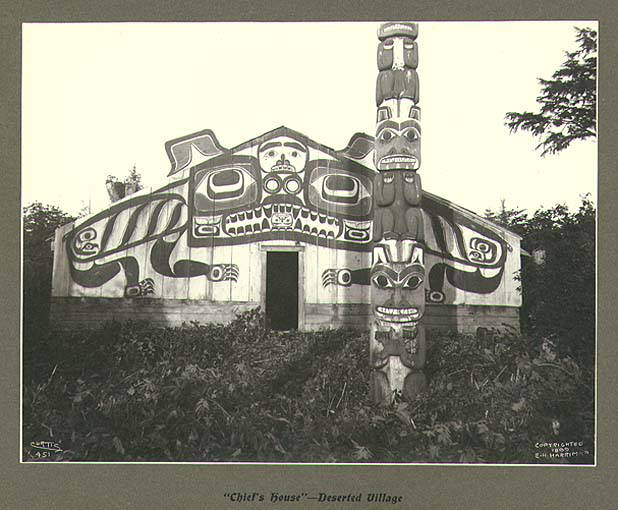
Home of a Tlingit chief with a totem pole outside, these poles would commemorate the life of the chief and his family

The introduction of iron tools allowed for a greater proliferation of totem poles, with Tlingit villages reportedly having far more totem poles by the early 1800s, and numerous Tlingit families possessing large poles in front of their homes. The totem pole could not be read like a book, knowledge of the stories and legends was required beforehand by the observer before they could understand the specific meaning of the assemblage of symbols and characters on the pole. Crests and totemic symbols provided context to the reader, and based upon the appearance and patterns of the characters, the reader could glean what the meaning of the totem was. In the totemic tradition, the two principal figures are the Raven and the Wolf, with the Raven appearing with great regularity among the Tlingit. In many Tlingit and other stories in the Northwest, the Raven is a central protagonist; having stolen the sun, the waters, and the fish in order to create and provide for the lands of the Tlingit. Totem poles also fulfilled the role of showing off the power of a ruler or family and commemorating the dead. Some totem poles were a means for a family to store the ashes of a deceased family member, so that the remains of the deceased would remain on the property of family. The cremated remains would be placed inside of a carved wooden box which would then be deposited inside a totem pole or hollowed out tree, the totems used for the storing of human remains were referred to as "Mortuary Poles". Tlingit chiefs would erect vividly designed and colored totem poles in order to commemorate their achievements as chief, as well as showing of his social status and wealth. In anticipation of great Potlatches, some being planned for years, wealthy Tlingit would commission craftsmen for the creation of some of the largest and most vivid totem poles in order to commemorate the event.

=== Tattoos and body piercings ===
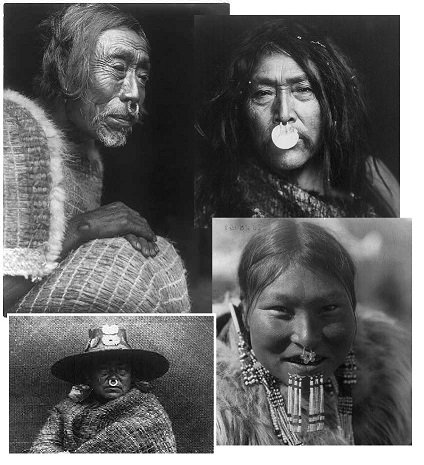
Clockwise from left: A Tlingit woman dressed for potlatch with copper septum ring, a Nakoaktok chief with copper septum ring and an armload of copper, an Inuk woman from Nunivak with beaded septum and beaded labrets.

Both sexes among adults and children above the age of 8 belonging to the higher classes wore some kind of earlobe ornament. Popular among the Tlingit were ornaments made of haliotis shells, copper, wood, and bone which were shaped to assume different geometrical forms. The earrings of men were known as “Dis Yar Kuku”, a half moon shaped earring that would represent a variety of different animals and patterns. As the Tlingit became familiar with metal working and materials such as silver, they tended to use older ornaments of bone and wood with decreasing frequency. The Tlingit dead were properly dressed and given a nose ring called a "tunás".

The Tlingit traditionally painted their faces with colors of white, black, and red which with traditional methods can remain on the body for months on end. These body paints protected the body from the elements in the winter seasons, guarding against snow blindness, while additionally being used in the summer seasons to ward off gnats and mosquitoes. More complicated body-paints were created through the mixing of fungi, ash, roots, clays, and charcoal while for temporary purposes Tlingit would simply rely on charcoal. Black was commonly used as a marking of death, anger, sorrow, and war, and it was not uncommon for Tlingit to blacken the face with charcoal markings in the event of insult or conflict.

Tattooing, or Kuh Karlh “Mark” to the Tlingit, was largely developed by the Haida peoples who then introduced the practice to Tlingit that lived in closer proximity to them. French explorer La Perouse writes in 1799; “I saw no appearance of tattooing except on the arms of some women.” However, tattooing still held high cultural significance in Tlingit society and would be a marker of being a member of higher status families and households. Slaves were prohibited from being tattooed. The operation was also expensive, requiring the individual being tattooed to pay the artist, almost always a woman, in blankets and food. The process involved the passing of a needle, bone or metal, with blue-black stained sinew beneath the skin to create the necessary designs and motifs. The young girls of wealthy Tlingit households would often be tattooed at great potlatches.

=== Knives and daggers ===
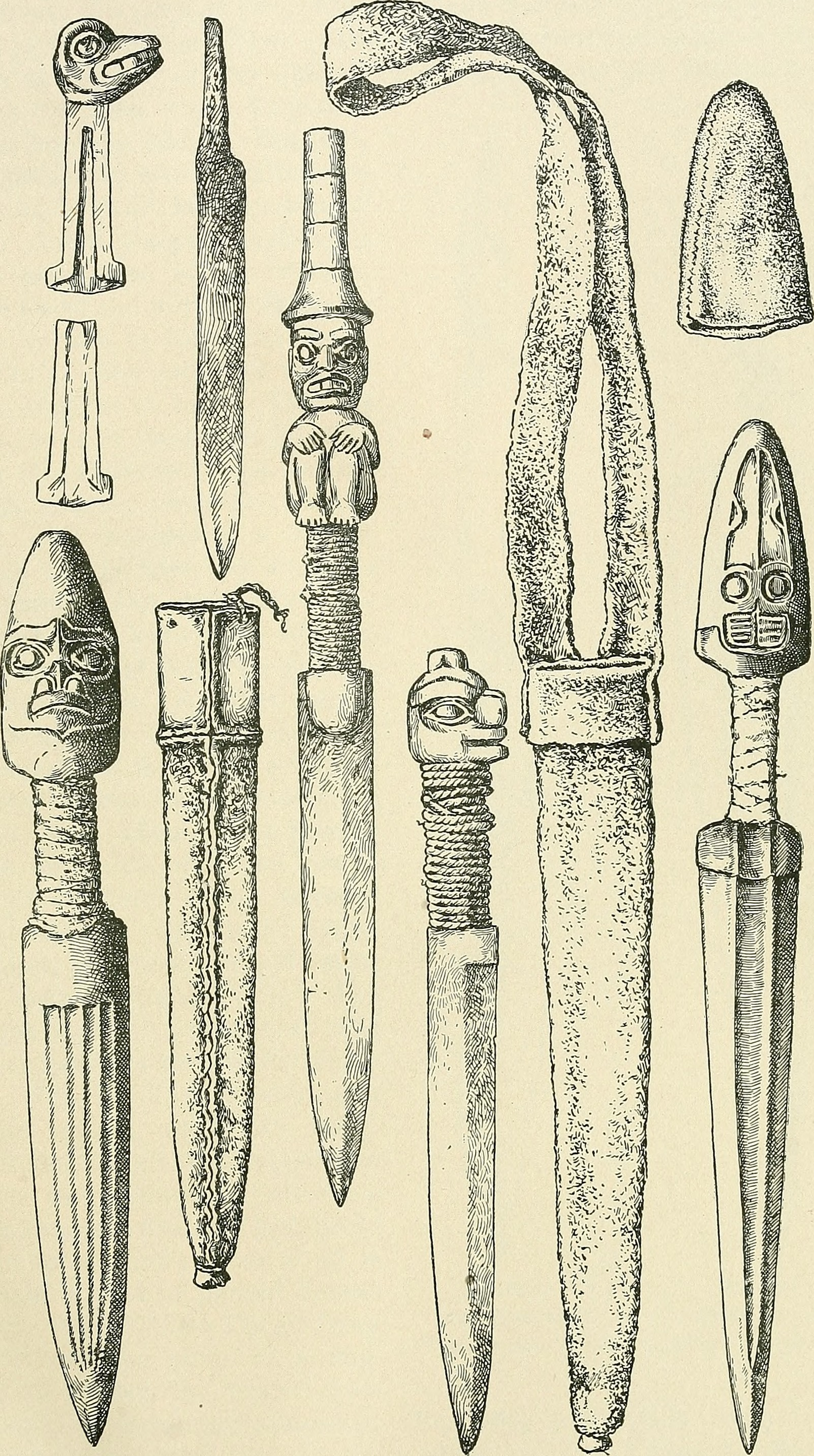
Sketch of Tlingit daggers from the Smithsonian Institution

The metal daggers of the Tlingit fall under three primary categories; double bladed, hafted-pommel, and for sale blades. These daggers utilize materials such as copper, iron, and steel for the proper blades in addition to these metals the guards of such weapons could be fabricated from ivory, bone, wood, leather, and the other aforementioned metals. Daggers specifically used for warfare have a leather strip called the “thong” which extends from the upper back of the hilt, the fighting Tlingit warrior would then wrap the leather thong around the wrist to maintain control of the weapon. Blades of the Tlingit with ornate and non-bladed pommels would be “hafted-pommel” blades, which are often characterized by an artistic ornate pommel. These ornate pommels depict artistic representations of animals such as ravens, bears, and other wildlife that are Tlingit cultural subjects. The artistic complexity of Tlingit daggers would reach its climax in the early 19th century, as Tlingit smiths began to increasingly add more designs to their blades using copper for additional artistic details such as crests and scenes. These daggers were symbols of status and authority in Tlingit society, a more ornate weapon would garner respect from one's peers and would be a respectable heirloom passed through generations of Tlingit. The introduction of firearms phased out the importance of the Tlingit dagger as an implementation of war, though they remained as a striking symbol of status.

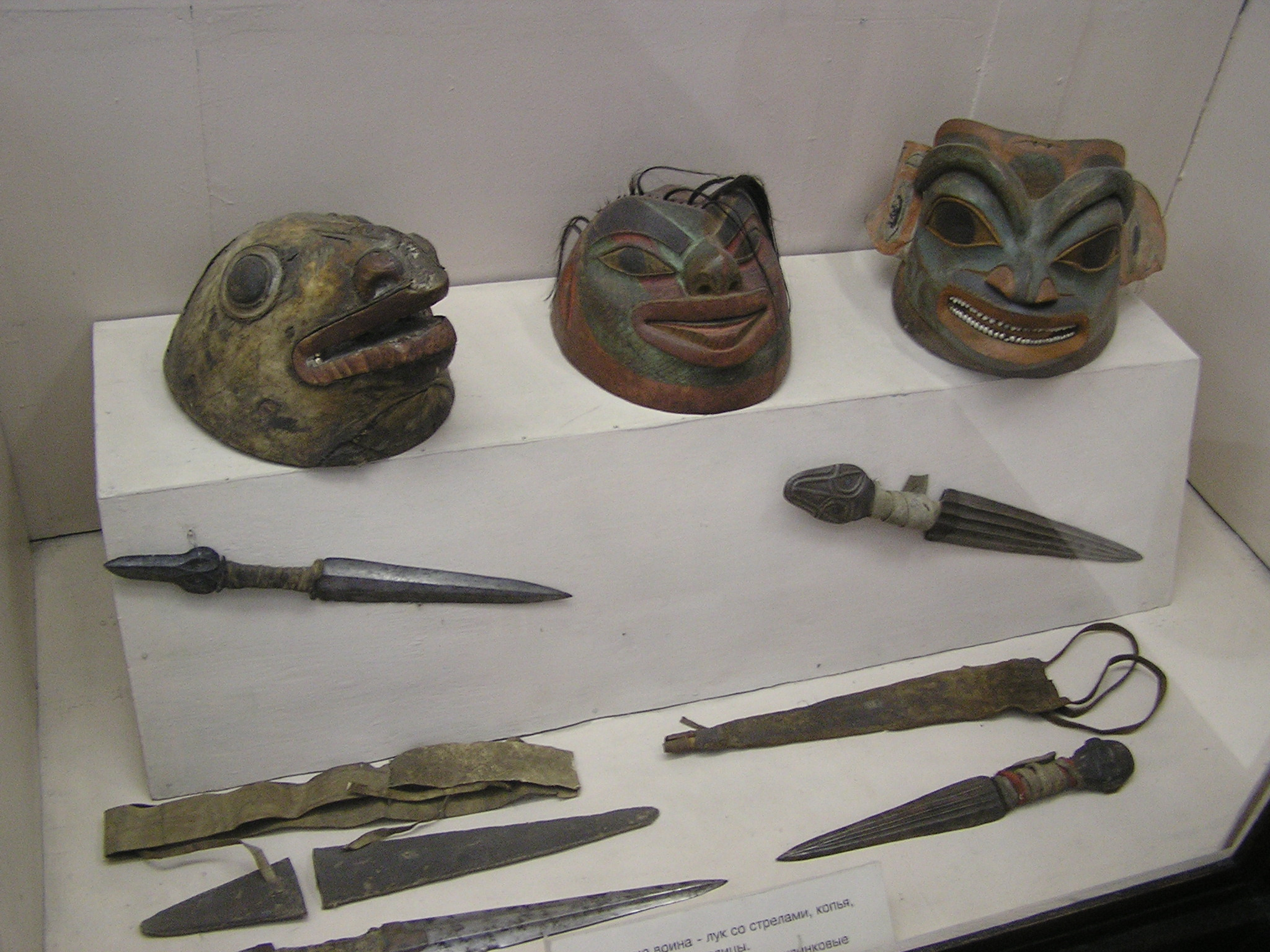
Tlingit Helmets and Knives from the Saint Petersburg Museum

Prior to mercantile interactions with Europeans, copper was the primary metal used by Alaskan Indigenous peoples. Ahtna Athabascan peoples of the Alaskan copper river controlled much of the copper trade, forcing the Tlingit to develop long-standing trade relations with the Anthabascan. In Tlingit oral tradition, iron was first discovered as “drift iron” from a shipwreck, and was then used for in their metallurgical endeavors. When trade began in earnest with Europeans one English captain named George Dixon wrote on the high standards held by the Tlingit in regard to their metal, stating that they would deal only with iron pieces ranging from 8 to 14 inches. In 1786, Jean-Francois de Galoup the Comte de La Perouse, wrote that the Tlingit had; “No great desire for anything but iron… Everyone had a dagger of it (iron) suspended from the neck.”

== War ==
=== In the Pacific Northwest ===
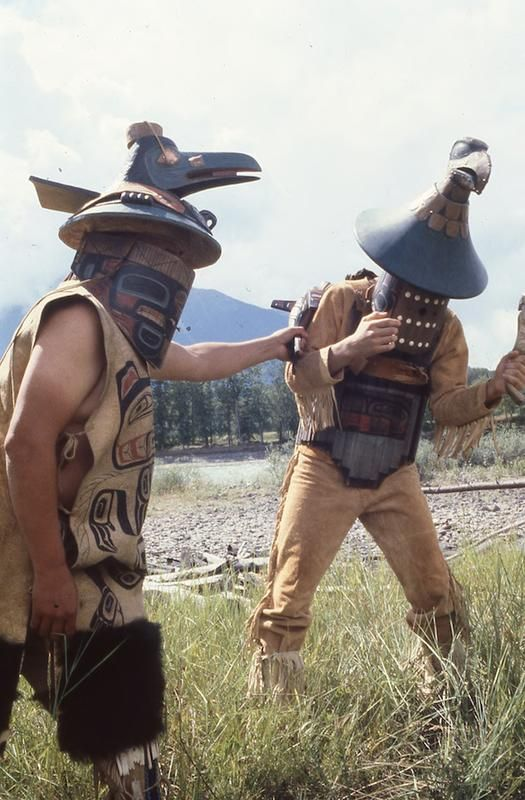
The Gitxsan tribe. Members of a reenactment group at the Ksan Historical Village showcase the equipment worn by many Indigenous warriors in Alaska and the Pacific Northwest.

The Tlingit, Haida, and Eastern Aleuts produced some of the best warriors in the Northwest, with these tribes often engaging in battle against one another in order to procure slaves and material resources. In the pursuit of resources and slaves, Tlingit would sometimes venture hundreds of miles across the Pacific Northwest. The Tlingit were often at odds with the Haida and Tsimshian in the south, Chugach, and sometimes the Alutiiq in the North. In order to defend their families and local communities, as there did not exist any kind of central government that could levy protection, individual groups of Tlingit warriors would band together for defensive and offensive actions. The war season for the majority of the groups in the Northwest, including the Tlingit, was the month of July (Tlexa). July was a time of favorable weather, allowing for armed disputes to be settled and for Potlatches to be held.

The warrior of the Tlingit was protected by a dense wooden helmet, in addition to a neck protector and visor to protect the warrior's face. Furthermore, the warrior wore linens and a leather jacket beneath wooden slat armor, which would be sometimes vividly painted with Tlingit aesthetic motifs. With the introduction of the musket into the Tlingit world, Tlingit armorers added a layer of leather over the armor in order to protect the wearer from musket balls. Wooden armor was nothing unique to the Tlingit in this region of North America, other tribes such as the Haida and the Gitxsan used wooden armor amongst their warriors. Warriors of the Tlingit carried with them their iconic knives which they wore over their shoulder, in addition to this they carried spears, bows, and beginning in the 18th and 19th century they carried European muskets as well.

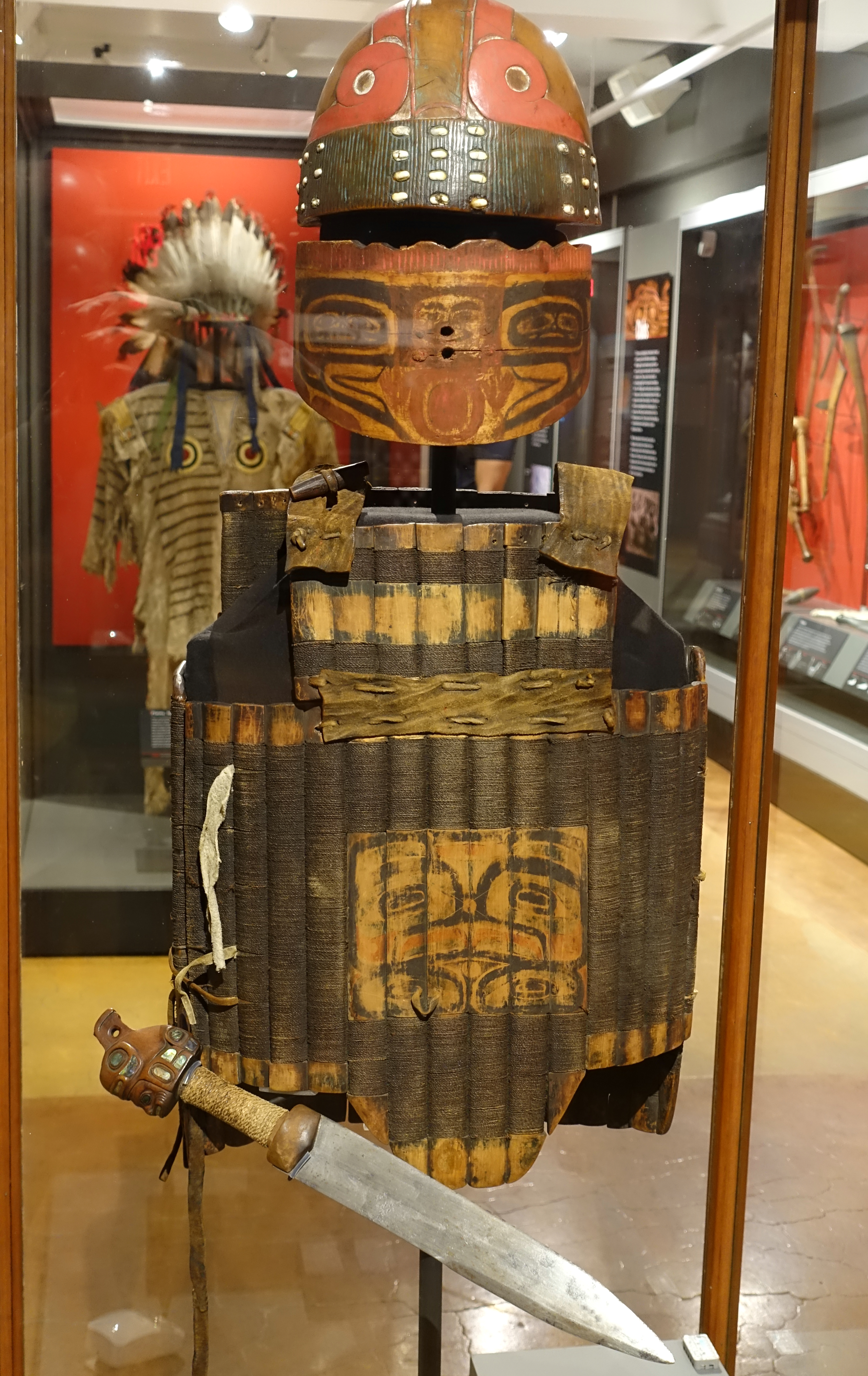
Wooden slat armor and Tlingit dagger made of imported steel-Peabody Museum

When the Tlingit did battle against European foes, foreign observers noted that the Tlingit were quick to make use of European technologies in order to triumph over their foes, and that the military forces of the Tlingit were well organized in their campaigns. The Russian American Company was a recurring foe of the Tlingit which under the leadership of Alexander Baronov, utilized other indigenous tribes, such as the Unangax, that held grudges and grievances against the Tlingit, in order to augment the fighting capabilities of Russian colonial forces in the Sitka Wars. In 1802, a coalition of Tlingit tribes were able to overcome the Russian garrison at Sitka and take control of the region, building their own fortifications and armed with cannons. At the Battle of Sitka, Russian forces with great difficulty were able to drive the Tlingit from Sitka, with the Tlingit not returning to the region until 1824, yet the Tlingit were able to continue harassing Russian forces and proved to be a competent fighting force.

=== Shamans and spirits ===
Shaman were very influential and important figures in Tlingit warfare, engaging in the direction of much of the necessary training, coordination, and preparation of the outgoing war party. The Shaman would direct engagements from a defensible or hidden position, one example being that the Tlingit Shaman would position themselves in a canoe during battle and cover the top of the canoe in heavily reinforced mats. Spirits were integral to these engagements, as the feuding warriors would give war calls relating to their crest spirit by invoking actions that the spirits would allow the warrior to take or even actions that the spirit itself would take against the enemy of the warrior. This back and forth between the warring parties would continue in order to incite fear in either side, and could at times settle the engagement without blood being shed. The goal of most of these conflicts was to procure resources and tribute, extremely bloody actions were often not in the best interests for any of the warring parties unless absolutely required.

=== Body armor ===
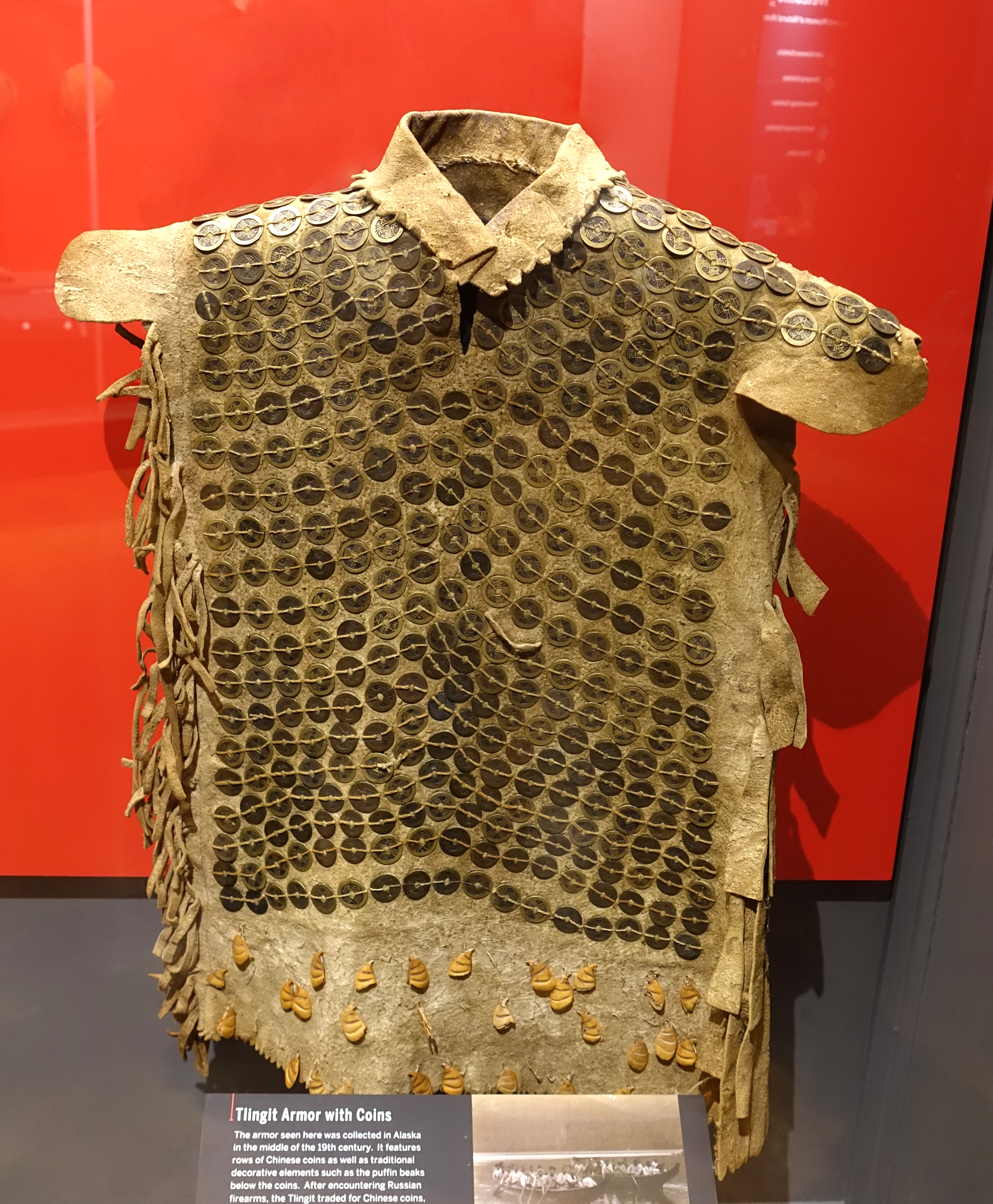
Tlingit body armour made with Chinese cash coins, Peabody Museum of Archaeology and Ethnology.

The Tlingits used a body armor made from Chinese cash coins, these coins were introduced by Russian traders from Qing China between the seventeenth and eighteenth centuries who traded them for animal skins which were in turn traded with the Chinese for tea, silk, and porcelain by these European traders. The Tlingits believed that these cash coins would protect them from knife attacks and guns used by other indigenous American tribes and Russians. Some Tlingit body armors are completely covered in Qing dynasty era cash coins while others have them sewn in chevron patterns. Other than on their armor the Tlingits also used Chinese cash coins on masks and ceremonial robes such as the Gitxsan dancing cape as these coins were used as a symbol of wealth representing a powerful far away country. The cash coins used by the Tlingit are all from the Qing dynasty and bear inscriptions of the Shunzhi, Kangxi, and Yongzheng emperors.

== Notable Tlingit ==
- Nora Marks Dauenhauer
- Chief Shakes
- Elizabeth Peratrovich
- Walter Soboleff
- Ellen Hope Hays
