= Shamanism among Alaska Natives =

Shamanism among Alaska Natives served to construct a common spiritual connection to their land, and a kinship with the animals with whom they share that land, before the introduction of western culture and the religions that are now practiced in Alaska. Although shamanism is no longer popularly practiced, it was and continues to be the heart of the Native Alaskan people.

Shamanism is the most common name for a diverse set of practices; in Alaska, it is centered in the animals that are common in the area. Through the use of many myths, stories, and ceremonies these animals are personified and their spirits made tangible and in turn are deeply woven within the Native Alaska people today. It was through the shaman that the spirit world was connected to the natural world.

Among the Inuit, spiritual healers are traditionally known as angakkuq, while the Yup’ik term is angalkuq. A shaman in Alaska Native culture was a mediator, healer and the spirit worlds' mouthpiece. While the English term "shaman" is widely used, it may not fully capture the cultural specificity and diversity of practices among Alaska Native groups.

== Historical Context ==
Prior to European contact, Alaska Native shamans played multifaceted roles as doctors, spiritual leaders, and social mediators. Colonization — particularly by Russian Orthodox and later American Protestant missionaries — actively suppressed shamanic practice. Conversion efforts, boarding schools, and the criminalization of ceremonial life all contributed to a loss of traditional knowledge. Despite these pressures, oral transmission and syncretism allowed many aspects of shamanic culture to survive, sometimes hidden within Christian practice or cultural revival efforts.

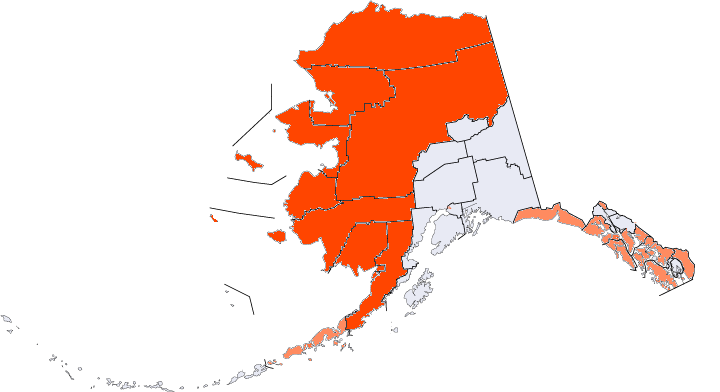
Native American majority and plurality in Alaska boroughs and census areas

== Aleuts ==
The religion of the former Aleuts was an offshoot of the prevailing shamanistic beliefs common to the northern Inuit (formerly Eskimo) and to the tribes of northeastern Asia. They believed in the existence of a creator of everything visible and invisible, but did not connect him with the guidance of the world, and paid him no special worship. As rulers of their entire environment, they acknowledged two spirits, or kinds of spirits, who determined the fate of man in every respect.

The earliest Aleuts worshipped light, the celestial bodies, and even the elements. They also believed that there were three worlds, to which they ascribed being and action. The first world, highest world, has no night or evening, and many people live there. The second, or middle world, is the earth. The third is subterranean and called lowest world.

The aboriginal Aleuts had no temples or idols, but there were holy or forbidden localities known as awabayabax. Here they made offerings to invisible spirits. Such holy places were found in every village, being usually a mound, or some prominent place or a crag, which women and young men were strictly prohibited from visiting, and especially from gathering the grasses for their basketry, or taking away stones. If any young person, either from audacity or curiosity, violated this restriction, such infraction was sure to be followed by terrible "wild" disease, speedy death, or at least insanity. Old men could visit these spots at certain times, but only for the purpose of making offerings.

Among the past-tie Aleuts were both shamans and shamanism. They were considered to be the intermediaries between the visible and invisible worlds, between men and spirits, and the Aleuts believed they were acquainted with demonology and could foretell the future and aid sufferers. And though they were not professional obstetricians, yet as magicians their services were in request in cases of difficult childbirth. Shamans were the aboriginal specialists in dealing with the supernatural. They cured the sick, foretold the future, brought success in hunting and warfare, and performed other similar tasks.

The old Aleuts related that long before the advent of the Russians, the shamans predicted that White men with strange customs would come to them from beyond the edge of the sea, and that subsequently all Aleuts would become like the new arrivals and live according to their habits. They also saw, looking far into the future, a brilliant redness in the sky like a great new world, called arialiyaiyam akxa, containing many people resembling the newcomers.

Aleuts believed that death stemmed from both natural and supernatural causes. The dead were treated in a range of ways, including mummification and cave burial of high-ranking men, women, and children, burial in special stone and wooden burial structures, and interment in small holes in the ground adjacent to habitations. Spirits of deceased individuals continued to "live", although details of any notion of an afterlife or of reincarnation are scanty.

Prior to contact, Aleut ceremonies were likely held in the winter. Through singing, dancing, drumming, and wearing masks, the people entertained themselves and honored deceased relatives. Social rank was likely bolstered through bestowal of gifts. Today, Aleut ceremonies are those of the Russian Orthodox Church.

== Athabaskan ==
The shaman within this culture was the middle-person between spirits and the native peoples. Alaskan Athabaskan shamans guarded people against the effects of bad spirits. The shaman also diagnosed various illnesses and restored the health of those harmed by bad spirits. The shaman could also provide the valuable service of scapulimancy, which predicted the location of game when hunting was scarce.

An infamous bad spirit was the Giyeg. The belief was that people became sick because Giyeg thought about them. The shaman's job was to distract Giyeg or else the person died. Another well-known bad spirit was the Nahani, also known as the woodsman. The woodsman was believed to be the spirit of people who got lost in the woods.

The human spirit was called the yega and upon death, the yega had to be properly guided to the afterlife. Athabaskans believed that human and animals were very similar in the past and their spirits communicated directly. If an animal was mistreated, then its respective spirit would wrack havoc on the lives of the offending Athabaskan. The lines of communication between spirits and Native Athabaskans were kept open using the shaman to translate. There are still spiritual beliefs about the connection between animals and humans prevalent in the Athabaskan culture. The raven is the most popular animal followed by the caribou, wolf and bear.

Ceremonies were designated to protect, heal or cleanse. The energy generated by the people and more importantly the shaman dictated the connection with the spirits and effectiveness of results. A popular after-death ceremony being a potlatch, allowed for the shaman to offer a smooth transition to the yega of the deceased. Food, water, song and dance are all examples of goods offered to the yega.

Being the revered medicine person, the shaman could use their power for either good or evil. People both feared and admired the shamans because of their extraordinary abilities. The most evil of shamans wielded their control over people through use of puppets, sometimes using them to send out threatening messages.

When Christianity's influence started spreading, shamans lost credibility. Among the last attempts to keep shamanism alive is said to have been perpetuated by two Barrow shamans. The two said they had received a message from above which stated that a new developing shamanistic religion was better for them than the white man's religion. This rumor gained them some fans for a time but eventually they lost out to Christianity. It is said that one shaman converted to Christianity while the other committed suicide.

As a few points of interest, in the Denaʼina peoples' eyes the "white man" could not be helped by the shaman because he was believed to have the soul of a deceased Indian within. Shamans had to demonstrate their powers in order to have credibility. Tales include flying through the air, being shot then coughing up the offending bullet, etc. Three great Shamans among Athabaskans are Otsioza of Nulato, Noidola'an of the Koyukuk and Kedzaludia of the Kokrines-Tanana Mission group. Shamanism is one aspect of Athabaskan culture that is not being revived due to its controversial methods but there are those who still privately practice it.

== Haida ==
To the Haida, the universe is composed of a multiplicity of interconnecting and overlapping layers. According to some, Haida once perceived the flat, circular Earth to be centred between a land above, supported by a pillar from the earth, and a watery underworld below. Certain interpretations of ḵ'aygang.nga, the Haida canon of ancestral oral histories that were recited across generations by professional story-tellers, show the origins of the modern Haida worldview, which remains convoluted and complex, involving interlaced layers of tangible and intangible reality... Many Haida believe in a supernatural world in which everything embodies a spirit including animals, medicines, mountains, lakes, and caves. Haida make offerings of tobacco, birds’ feathers and food to honour powerful supernatural beings and communicate with ancestors and ancestral guardians. Haida people honour the beings in supernatural and tangible realities through dances, songs, offerings, and private and public prayer. Dancing and singing is a way to express, teach, and learn about the world and the natural, supernatural and ancestral beings that inhabit it. Dance is a link to the supernatural world through which Haida can access and experience supernatural possession. In the past, should someone become possessed by an evil spirit, a sg̱aaga, a Haida shaman, could be brought to draw spirits forth from the body.

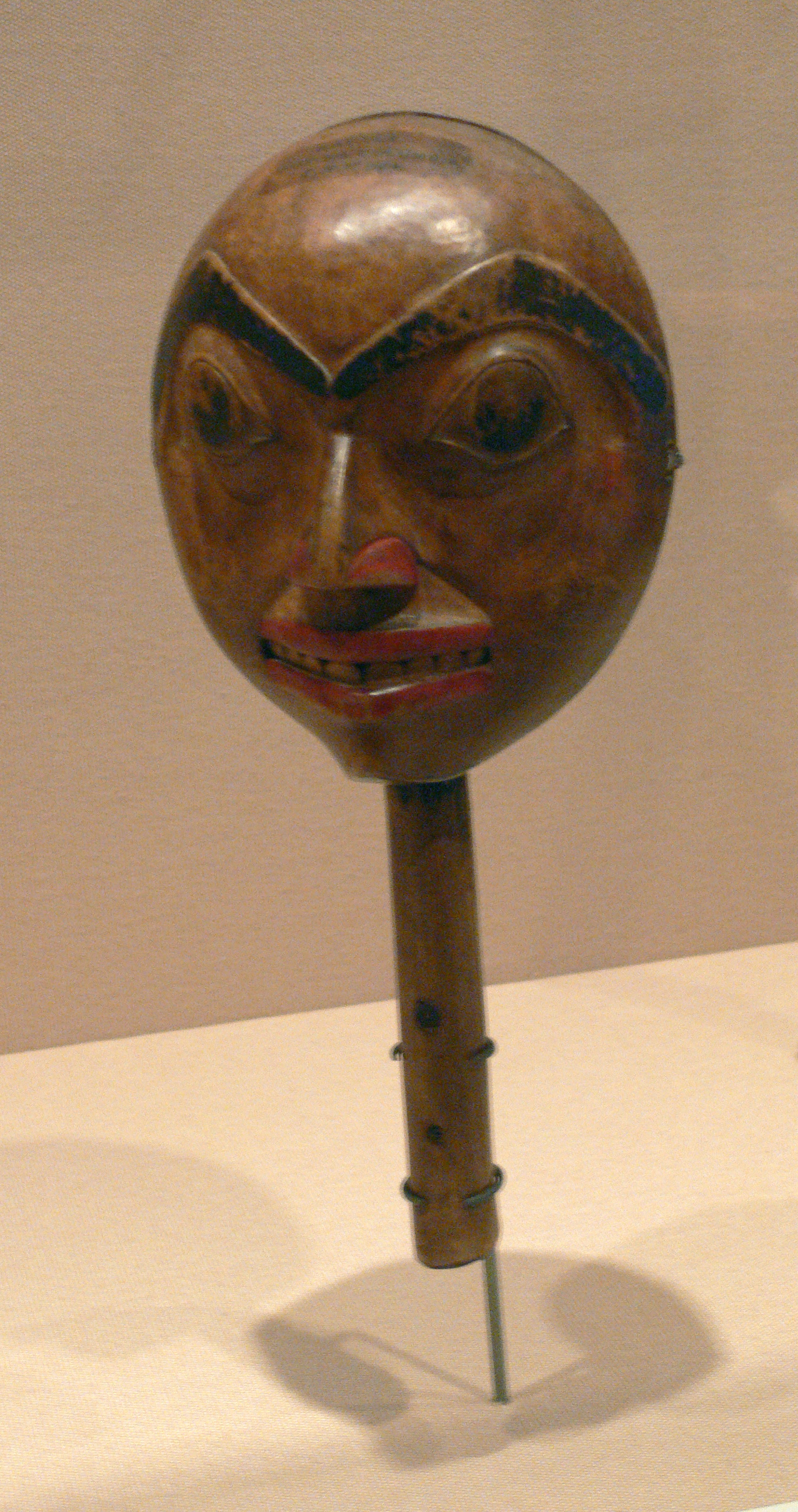
Haida rattle

Some Haida people believe that they are protected by ancestral supernatural beings such as the bear, raven, and owl. They often depict these animals in their complex paintings, carvings, and tattoos, most recognizably in their carved totem poles which were made out of primarily Western Red Cedar trees. They pray, make offerings and strongly believe in their spirits' abilities to aid and protect them. In the past, the people relied on a sg̱aaga to help them contact and communicate with the supernatural world.

In Haida tradition the rites and secrets of the sg̱aaga's vocation were secret, and often required hereditary connections as well as complex and strenuous rites of passage to attain. The skills of the sg̱aaga were often obtained through an apprenticeship. The individual (most often a male, but in rare cases female) was "called" to being his tribes sg̱aaga or the title was passed on from an uncle. When the hopeful felt he had prepared enough, he entered into the woods for eight days with only an assistant, where he meditated and fasted. After those eight days, if it was truly the aspirant’s fate to become a sg̱aaga, he would fall into a trance (sometimes after falling into unconsciousness) and receive a message from the supernatural world. After regaining consciousness, the sg̱aaga and the assistant would seek out a land otter and cut out a piece of its tongue. It became an amulet, wrapped in a piece of his clothing and the source of his land otter power.

After the hopeful had become a sg̱aaga, he continued his rigid discipline, by bathing in icy water, exercising and drinking Devil's club juice, a native species of ginseng, daily. Appearance was important to those who were sg̱aaga; they wore tunics that were soaked in seal oil, and around their neck hung a necklace with animal claws and various carved amulets. The Haida believed that the sg̱aaga's hair was the source of his power, thus it was never touched and left to grow long and often uncombed. When the sg̱aaga performed ceremonies, his face was blackened with coal. If the ceremony required that he or she be naked, their long hair that sometimes hung to the ground covered their bodies. Tools that accompanied the sg̱aaga to complete his rituals were an oval rattle and hollowed out bone if disease needed to be blown away. Illness was believed to be caused by thoughts and behaviour that acted against nature, and was then called out by the sg̱aaga and then asked for the spirits to cleanse and heal the individual. The clairvoyant sg̱aaga could sense if the fierce Haida warriors could achieve victory over their enemies before the battle. Believing in reincarnation, if a member of the tribe should pass away, the sg̱aaga was able to predict which newborn child would inherit the deceased spirit. A reincarnated spirit is called x̱anjii. Working through the power of another spirit the sg̱aaga risked losing his own identity or being possessed by it, thus he changed his contacts and disciplines often.

With the introduction of smallpox, which Haida call Haayhiilaas, western religion, and ultimately residential schools, and much of Haida worldview was destroyed. Missionaries came along with the fur trade to Haida villages and taught or forced Haida people to speak, read and write English. Through the introduction of western culture Haida lost some of their own. Most notably was the loss of their language, now only about a dozen elders still speak Haida language. Before the missionaries Haida people kept remarkably accurate histories by memorizing the ḵ'aygang.nga word for word, reciting and passing them on through generations. Much of the ḵ'aygang.nga that survive or were recorded discuss events that could be over 14,000 years old, including events from the glacial era, like the separation of Haida Gwaii from the mainland. These events are frequently confirmed by archeological findings. But after the purposeful obliteration of Haida way of being, tradition, language, art forms, rights and title by missionaries and US, Canadian, state, provincial and colonial governments, much was lost. Today Christianity remains prevalent among Haida, and the Russian Orthodox missionaries came to the Southern Alaskan shore in the 18th century where small congregations are still active.

== Tlingit ==
Shamanism has to do with the belief that the shaman is a mediator for the spiritual world. In various cultures the shaman's role is different; in that of Tlingit culture the shaman is a healer and seer. The shaman performs various rituals and ceremonies and helps with civil disputes. The role of shaman is primarily inherited by a son or a grandson due to the fact they are already in possession of the drums and tools needed. Not everyone can be a shaman, but if one has the ability to become a shaman one is almost always forced into it. Though shamans are held with great respect and esteem, they are feared because of their ability to speak with the spiritual world and ability to use magic.

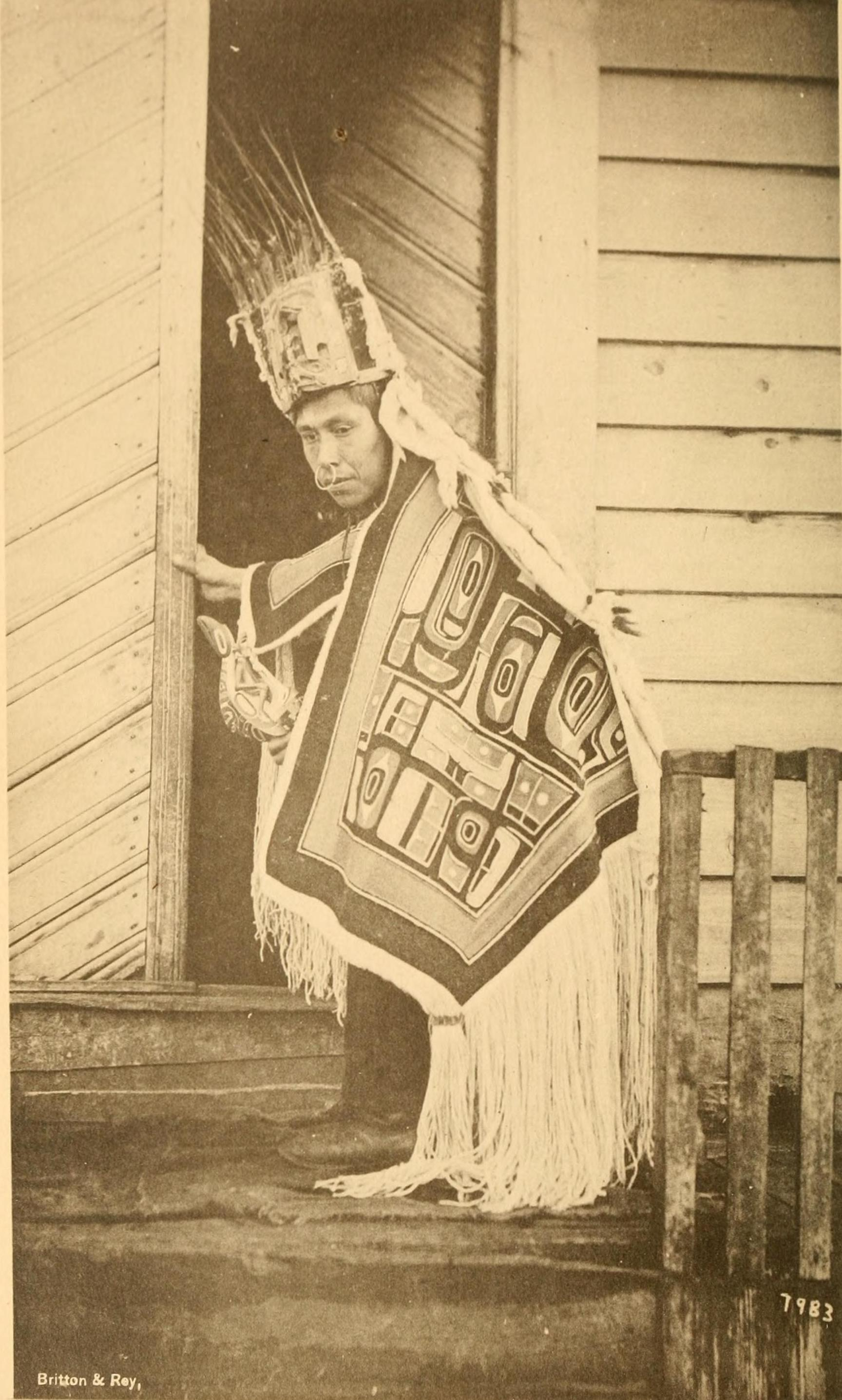
Tlingit shaman

The shaman is referred to as íx̲t’, the way that the shaman looks in the Tlingit culture, wild, dirty appearance, with hair loosely hanging in strands, he is never touched by scissors or comb. A shaman has in his possession all kinds of decorative objects used throughout various ceremonies and rituals. For each spirit the shaman has a special mask, which he uses when he appeals to that spirit. To conjure a spirit, a wild dance may be performed around the fire during which violent contortions of the body take place. The shaman can cure sickness by driving out evil spirits, bring good weather, and bring about large fish runs. For services such as these he collects a good amount of pay, and in fact he always gets it in advance.

When a shaman passes, his burial is also different from that of all other Tlingit. The body of a shaman is not ever supposed to decompose because one of his first spirits stays with him, so it dries like a dried salmon.

Every Tlingit has his own guardian spirit called tu kinaayéik (tu – 'inside', kinaa – 'above', yéik – 'spirit helper'). An evil or unclean person is deserted by his spirit. All spirits like cleanliness, the sound of the drum and rattle. A shaman who wishes to summon the spirits must practice alone for three to twelve months and the house in which the performance is to take place must be carefully cleaned as well as the songs and the dances.

Another duty of the shaman in Tlingit society is to expose witches. Witches, both men and women, are called naakws’aatí ('master of medicine') and are supposed to have learned their skills from Raven while he lived on Earth. A witch is someone who harms another through magic, or are a source of illness. The shaman helps the person who is the victim of this witchcraft by thoroughly cleaning their house, and finding their belongings that the witch stole to perform this act.

The ability of a shaman depends on the amount of spirits under his control and if he is a good shaman he can prosper, but if he does not maintain proper rapport with these spirits they might kill him. Every shaman in the Tlingit culture has his own spirits for whom there are special names and songs. He rarely inherits the spirits of ancestors, but they do occasionally appear to him and then the shaman makes a practice of entertaining them. Another belief is that the shaman has the power to throw his spirits into anyone who does not believe in him; and these people faint, or gets cramps. A shaman can bring better weather, the shaman will go into the water; if his hair gets wet, it will rain.

== Yup’ik Shamans ==
Yup’ik spiritual life emphasized reciprocity with animal spirits. Shamans (angalkuq) worked to maintain this balance, especially through seasonal ceremonies. They communicated with spirit helpers, treated the sick, and predicted changes in weather or game patterns.

Masks were a critical part of ritual life, used to embody spirits during dances and storytelling. While many of these practices were suppressed, modern cultural institutions have revived interest in mask carving, drumming, and dance as forms of spiritual continuity. Some Yup’ik elders still speak of spiritual experiences similar to those once performed by shamans.

== See also ==
- Alaska Native religion
- Angakkuq
- Inuit religion
- Traditional Alaska Native medicine
