= Alaska Native Tribal Health Consortium Land Transfer Act =

- Long title: To provide for the conveyance of certain property located in Anchorage, Alaska, from the United States to the Alaska Native Tribal Health Consortium.
- Announced in: the 113th United States Congress
- Sponsored by: Rep. Don Young (R, AK-0)
- Number of co-sponsors: 0

Codification
- Acts affected: Comprehensive Environmental Response, Compensation, and Liability Act of 1980
- U.S.C. sections affected: 42 U.S.C. § 9620
- Agencies affected: Department of Health and Human Services

Legislative history
- Introduced in the House as H.R. 623 by Rep. Don Young (R, AK-0) on February 12, 2013; Committee consideration by United States House Committee on Natural Resources, United States House Committee on Energy and Commerce, United States House Energy Subcommittee on Health, United States House Natural Resources Subcommittee on Indian and Alaska Native Affairs

The Alaska Native Tribal Health Consortium Land Transfer Act (H.R. 623; Pub. L. 113–68 (text) (PDF)) is a bill that would transfer some land in Alaska from the federal government to the Alaska Native Tribal Health Consortium, a non-profit health organization. The land will be used to build a patient housing facility so that the organization can treat people who travel there from distant rural areas. The bill passed in the United States House of Representatives during the 113th United States Congress. The bill was signed into law.

== Provisions of the bill ==
This summary is based largely on the summary provided by the Congressional Research Service, a public domain source.

The Alaska Native Tribal Health Consortium Land Transfer Act would direct the Secretary of Health and Human Services (HHS) to convey to the Alaska Native Tribal Health Consortium a specified property in Anchorage, Alaska, for use in connection with health and related programs.

== Procedural history ==
=== House ===
The Alaska Native Tribal Health Consortium Land Transfer Act was introduced in the House on February 12, 2013 by Rep. Don Young (R, AK-0). It was referred to the United States House Committee on Natural Resources, the United States House Committee on Energy and Commerce, the United States House Energy Subcommittee on Health, and the United States House Natural Resources Subcommittee on Indian and Alaska Native Affairs. It was reported (Amended) by the Committee on Natural Resources alongside House Report 113-248, Part I on October 22, 2013. On October 25, 2013, House Majority Leader Eric Cantor announced that H.R. 623 would be on the House schedule for the week of October 28, 2013. The bill was considered under the suspension of the rules. On October 29, 2013, the House voted to passed the bill by a voice vote.

== See also ==
- List of bills in the 113th United States Congress
