= Lew Freedman =

American sportswriter (born 1951)

Lew Freedman (born 1951) is a sportswriter and former sports editor of the Anchorage Daily News in Alaska and The Republic in Columbus, Indiana. He has worked on the staffs of the Chicago Tribune, Philadelphia Inquirer, and Florida Times-Union, and has authored numerous books.

== Education ==
Lew Freedman earned a BA in journalism from Boston University in 1973 and a master's in international communication from Alaska Pacific University in 1990.
