= Ellen Hope Hays =

Ellen Hope Hays (December 29, 1927 – October 8, 2013) was the first Alaska Native woman to be appointed superintendent of a national park (Sitka National Historical Park). During her 16-year career with the National Park Service, she worked to teach and preserve the culture of Alaska Natives.

== Early life and education ==
Ellen Hope Hays was born in Sitka, Alaska, to Andrew and Tillie Hope. She was the seventh of fourteen children. Her ancestral and matrilineal family is the X’aaká Hít (Point House) of the Kiks.ádi Clan (Raven moiety) of the Tlingit. Her given clan name is Kaakaltín (Raven Looking Forward).

She battled tuberculosis throughout her life and lost some of her sisters and her grandfather to tuberculosis.

Hays was not allowed to speak Lingít as a child. She grew up in an English-Presbyterian Christian household where she was only allowed to speak English.

Hays attended the Sheldon Jackson School and University of Alaska, Sitka Campus.

== Career ==
Hays rediscovered her heritage, or what she called “Old Customs” of the Lingít People, at the start of her professional career.

On April 17, 1967, Hays became the first woman to be admitted into the Alaska Native Brotherhood, Sitka Camp Number One. A few years after she was admitted, she became the President of the same Camp Number One.

In 1967, Hays began her career with the National Park Service (NPS) as a clerk and typist. She became a park technician at the Sitka National Monument, now Sitka National Historical Park, in 1970 and a park ranger in 1972. As a park ranger, Hays launched the Southeast Alaska Indian Cultural Center (SEAICC).

On July 9, 1974, she became superintendent of Sitka National Historical Park making her the first Alaskan Native woman to hold an NPS superintendent position. She was the third woman ever to hold this position and the first one in the Pacific Northwest. Four years later, she became the first Native Alaskan Liaison Officer in Anchorage, Alaska where she oversaw all National Park relations with the Alaskan Native Tribes. She remained in this role until her retirement from the NPS in 1983.

Hays remained active in Alaska Native affairs until her death.

== Honors and memberships ==
Hays was awarded an honorary Doctor of Law degree by the University of Alaska in 1996.

She was a member of a number of organization including the Alaska Native Brotherhood, The Alaska Native Sisterhood, the Alaska Federation of Natives, the Southeast Alaskan Native Women's Conference Planning Committee, the Tlingit & Haida Indian Tribes of Alaska, The Tlingit & Haida Community Council, Washington Chapter, the Institute of Alaska Native Art, the Alaska State Council on State Museum Planning Committee & Advisory Committee, the Sitka Village Planning Council, Sitka Historical Commission, the Sheldon Jackson Board of Trustees, the Council of Elders, and the Sitka Tribe of Alaska.

== Personal life ==
Hays' first marriage was to Roger Lang. The couple had one child, Karen Valorie Lang. In 1978, she married Henry Hays. They moved to Bainbridge Island, Washington in 1994 and lived there until returning to Sitka in 2013.

== Death and legacy ==
Hays died in Sitka, Alaska on October 8, 2013.
