= Alaska Native Tribal Health Consortium =

Non-profit organization in Alaska, U.S.

The Alaska Native Tribal Health Consortium (ANTHC) is a non-profit health organization based in Anchorage, Alaska, which provides health services to 158,000 Alaska Natives and American Indians in Alaska. Established in 1997, ANTHC is a consortium of the tribal regional health organizations. The board of directors for ANTHC equally represent all tribal regions of Alaska and each region has parity.

ANTHC is co-manager, with the Southcentral Foundation, of the Alaska Native Medical Center (ANMC), a 150-bed facility in Anchorage with a staff including more than 250 physicians and 700 nurses. ANMC is a level II trauma center, the highest level that can be achieved in Alaska. It has received Magnet Status for nursing excellence, a designation achieved by only about 7 percent of all hospitals nationwide. It is the only tribal operated hospital with Magnet Status in the United States. ANMC opened in its current facility in May 1997. ANMC has a hybrid operating room. ANTHC pays market rate compensation to all employees to retain and attract the best qualified Alaska Native professionals and top quality providers and engineers.

In 1998, ANTHC launched the Alaska Federal Health Care Access Network (AFHCAN) to provide primary and specialty telehealth services to Alaska Native communities.

In 2003, ANTHC developed the Alaska Dental Health Aide Program to train dental therapists who could provide culturally appropriate education and routine dental services under the supervision of a dentist to high-risk residents of rural villages. These therapists now provide dedicated access to oral health care for more than 35,000 individuals, most of whom lived in communities that typically did not have a dedicated provider.

In 2014, a new day surgery opened followed by new Infusion Center and Internal Medicine Clinics in 2016. In January 2017, ANTHC opened a new 202 bed patient housing facility which includes Ronald McDonald House on the 6th floor. This is the first partnership of a Ronald McDonald House with a tribal organization.

ANTHC is part of the Alaska Tribal Health System and is one of 22 co-signers of the Alaska Tribal Health Compact, a self-governance agreement with the Indian Health Service.

== Membership ==
- Kodiak Area Native Association
- Tanana Chiefs Conference
- Copper River Native Association
- Aleutian Pribilof Islands Association
- Arctic Slope Native Association
- Bristol Bay Area Health Corporation
- Chugachmiut, Native Village of Eyak
- Maniilaq Association
- Metlakatla Indian Community
- Norton Sound Health Corporation
- Southcentral Foundation
- Southeast Alaska Regional Health Consortium
- Chickaloon Native Village
- Yukon-Kuskokwim Health Corporation

== Legislation ==
The Alaska Native Tribal Health Consortium Land Transfer Act (H.R. 623; 113th Congress) is a bill that would transfer some land in Alaska from the federal government to the Alaska Native Tribal Health Consortium to be used to build a patient housing facility so that the organization can treat people who travel there from distant rural areas. The bill passed the United States House of Representatives on October 29, 2013.

== See also ==
- List of Alaska Native tribal entities
- List of hospitals in Alaska
