= Alaska Native Medical Center =

- Alaska Native Tribal Health Consortium and Southcentral Foundation

Geography
- Location: Anchorage, Alaska, United States
- Coordinates: 61°10′58″N 149°48′02″W

Services
- Beds: 167

Helipads
- Helipad: none

History
- Opened: 1997

Links
- Website: anmc.org
- Lists: Hospitals in Alaska

The Alaska Native Medical Center (ANMC) is a non-profit health center based in Anchorage, Alaska, United States, which provides medical services to 158,000 Alaska Natives and other Native Americans in Alaska. It acts as both the secondary and tertiary care referral hospital for the Alaska Region of the Indian Health Service (IHS). Established in 1997, ANMC is jointly owned and managed by the Alaska Native Tribal Health Consortium and Southcentral Foundation as well as tribal governments, and their regional health organizations.

The hospital is a 380,635 sq ft, 167-bed facility which opened in May 1997. It has a staff which includes over 250 physicians. ANMC is one of only two level II trauma centers in Alaska. The center is part of the Alaska Federal Health Care Access Network that provides telehealth services to 180 Alaska Native community village clinics. ANTHC opened a 202-bed patient housing facility connected by skybridge to ANMC on January 2, 2017. Ronald McDonald House occupies the 6th floor of patient housing for families and expectant mothers with high risk pregnancies. This is the first tribal partnership between Ronald McDonald House Charities and a tribal organization. ANMC had previously achieved magnet status but was unable to maintain it as of 2019. The largest hospital in United States Public Health Service history, the center was built with 168 million in federal funds secured by Senator Ted Stevens of Alaska after a thirty-year congressional battle.

The design architects were assisted by an Alaska Native design committee with the goal of integrating their traditional values, design aesthetics, lifestyles, and environmental concerns into a state-of-the-art hospital. This resulted in a modern facility with an atmosphere comfortable to Alaska Natives by using natural lighting, expansive views of the outside, traditional finishes and textures typical of Alaska Natives, as well as Native crafts and artwork displays. Construction was completed by a team of contractors and architects headed by Public Health Service professionals.

Quyana Hospitality Services is a complimentary service available to patients. Services include assistance with Medicaid extensions, housing upon provider referral, and patient travel within the Anchorage service area or following patient medevac to ANMC upon provider referral.

The old ANMC facility, built in 1953 as a tuberculosis sanitarium, was seriously damaged in the 1964 Alaska earthquake, and had been slated for replacement for many years. The five-year construction project for its relocation culminated on June 2, 1997, in a one-day move of all programs, patients and departments from the old facility in downtown Anchorage to the new building 6 miles (9.7 km) away.
