= Southcentral Foundation =

Healthcare organization

- Formation: Tax-exempt since December 1982; 43 years ago
- Type: 501(c)(3)
- Tax ID no.: EIN: 920086076
- Headquarters: Anchorage
- President and CEO: April Kyle
- Net Assets: 1,253,300,424 USD (2024)
- Revenue: 633,740,364 USD (2024)
- Expenses: 511,450,341 USD (2024)
- Website: www.southcentralfoundation.com

Southcentral Foundation (SCF) is an Alaska Native healthcare organization established by Cook Inlet Region, Inc. (CIRI) in 1982. The organization provides health and social services to Alaska Native and American Indian people. SCF operates under the ownership, management, and guidance of Alaska Native and American Indian communities.

During the tenure of former president and CEO Katherine Gottlieb, Southcentral Foundation became one of Alaska’s largest federally-recognized tribal health organizations, serving a geographical area of 107,413 square miles (278,200 km^{2}). The Foundation provides medical and human services to Alaska Native and American Indian people in the Municipality of Anchorage and the Matanuska-Susitna Borough.

In 1998, SCF assumed ownership and management of the primary care program of the Alaska Native Medical Center (ANMC) in Anchorage, Alaska, United States, and, in January 1999, began jointly managing and operating ANMC, along with the Alaska Native Tribal Health Consortium.

The Nuka System of Care was established by SCF in the late 1990s; as of 2015, it served approximately 65,000 individuals.
